= List of Czech writers =

Below is an alphabetical list of notable Czech writers.

== A ==
- Daniel Adam z Veleslavína (1546–1599), lexicographer, publisher, translator, and writer
- Michal Ajvaz (born 1949), novelist and poet, magic realist
- Karel Slavoj Amerling, also known as Karl Slavomil Amerling or Slavoj Strnad Klatovský (1807–1884), teacher, writer, and philosopher
- Hana Andronikova (born 1967), writer
- Jakub Arbes (1840–1914), writer and journalist, realist
- Ludvík Aškenazy (1921–1986), writer and journalist
- Josef Augusta (1903–1968), paleontologist, geologist, and science popularizer

== B ==
- Jindřich Šimon Baar (1869–1925), Catholic priest and writer, realist, author of the so-called country prose
- Bohuslav Balbín (1621–1688), writer and Jesuit
- Josef Barák (1833–1883), politician, journalist, and poet, member of the Májovci literary group
- Eduard Bass (1888–1946), writer, journalist, singer, and actor
- Jan František Beckovský (1658–1725), writer, historian, translator, and priest
- Kamil Bednář (1912–1972), poet, writer and translator
- Vavřinec Benedikt z Nudožer (1555–1615), mathematician, teacher, poet, translator, and philologist of Slovak origin, author of a Czech grammar
- Jan Beneš (1936–2007), writer and political prisoner
- Božena Benešová (1873–1936), prose writer.
- Alexandra Berková (1949–2008), novelist and screenwriter
- Zdeňka Bezděková (1907–1999), writer, philosopher and translator
- Petr Bezruč (1867–1958), poet and writer
- Konstantin Biebl (1898–1951), poet
- Jan Blahoslav (1523–1571), humanistic writer and composer
- Ivan Blatný (1919–1990), poet, member of Skupina 42 (Group 42)
- Lev Blatný (1894–1930), poet, author, theatre critic and Dramaturg
- Anna Bolavá (born 1981) novelist and poet
- Egon Bondy (1930–2007), philosopher, writer, and poet, the main personality of the Prague underground
- Tereza Boučková (born 1957), writer, dramatist and screenwriter
- Zuzana Brabcová (born 1959), novelist
- Arthur Breisky (1885–1910), writer, translator, playwright
- Otokar Březina (1868–1929), Symbolist poet and essayist
- Bedřich Bridel (1619–1680), baroque writer, poet, and missionary
- Max Brod (1884–1968), Jewish German-speaking author, composer, and journalist

== C ==
- Josef Čapek (1887–1945)
- Karel Čapek (1890–1938)
- Karel Matěj Čapek-Chod (1860–1927)
- Svatopluk Čech (1846–1908)
- František Čelakovský (1799–1852), poet and translator
- Jan Čep (1902–1974)
- Zuzana Černínová z Harasova (1600–1654), letter writer
- Petr Chelčický (c. 1390 – c. 1460)
- Václav Cílek (born 1955), geologist and science popularizer

== D ==
- Jakub Deml (1878–1961), priest and writer
- Dominika Dery (born 1975), poet, playwright, journalist, and memoirist, former ballet dancer
- Ivan Diviš (1924–1999), significant poet and essayist of the 2nd half of the 20th century
- Josef Dobrovský (1753–1829), linguist, lexicographer, and literary historian
- Jan Drda (1915–1970), prose writer and playwright
- Jaroslav Durych (1886–1962), prose writer, poet, playwright, journalist and surgeon
- Viktor Dyk (1877–1931), poet, prose writer, playwright and politician

== E ==
- Pavel Eisner (1889–1958), writer, poet and translator
- Karel Jaromír Erben (1811–1870)
- Karla Erbová (1933–2024), poet, prose writer, and journalist.

== F ==
- Ota Filip (born 1930)
- Otakar Fischer (1883–1938), translator, poet, literary historian and playwright.
- Viktor Fischl (1912–2006), poet, novelist and diplomat.
- Smil Flaška z Pardubic (1340s-1403).
- František Flos (1864–1961), novelist
- Jaroslav Foglar (1907–1999), novelist.
- Jaroslav Erik Frič (born 1949), poet and musician
- Luděk Frýbort (1933–2019), writer
- Norbert Frýd (1913–1976), writer, novelist, journalist and diplomat
- Emilie Fryšová (1840–1920), teacher, ethnographer and writer
- Julius Fučík (1903–1943)
- Renáta Fučíková (born 1964), illustrator and author of children's books
- Ladislav Fuks (1923–1994), novelist.

== G ==
- František Gellner (1881–1914), poet, short-story writer and anarchist.
- Adam Georgiev (born 1980), writer of gay literature
- Arnošt Goldflam (born 1949), playwright, director and actor.
- Hermann Grab (1903–1949), German-language writer
- Ladislav Grosman (1921–1981), novelist and screenwriter.
- Jiří Gruša (1938–2011), poet, prose writer, translator, literary critic, and politician

== H ==
- Václav Hájek z Libočan († 1553)
- František Halas (1901–1949)
- Vítězslav Hálek (1835–1874)
- Jaroslav Hašek (1883–1923)
- Jiří Haussmann (1898–1923)
- Václav Havel (1936–2011)
- Karel Havlíček Borovský (1821–1856)
- Iva Hercíková (1935–2007)
- Ignát Herrmann (1854–1935)
- Adolf Heyduk (1835–1923)
- Jaroslav Hilbert (1871–1936)
- Josef Hiršal (1920–2003), translator and poet
- Karel Hlaváček (1874–1898)
- Daniela Hodrová (born 1946)
- Vladimír Holan (1905–1980)
- Josef Holeček (1853–1929), South Bohemian writer, realist, author of the so-called country prose, and translator (Kalevala)
- Miroslav Holub (1923–1998), poet and immunologist
- Josef Hora (1891–1945)
- Egon Hostovský (1908–1973)
- Bohumil Hrabal (1914–1997)
- Petra Hůlová (born 1979), novelist, playwright, journalist
- Anna Regina Husová (1857–1945), teacher, writer and cultural historian
- Jan Hus (c. 1369/1370–1415)

== J ==
- Vlasta Javořická (1890–1979)
- Josef Jedlička (1927–1990)
- Milena Jesenská (1896–1944), journalist, writer, and translator
- Alois Jirásek (1851–1930)
- Ivan Martin Jirous (1944–2011)
- Josef Jungmann (1773–1847), lexicographer, linguist, translator, and poet

== K ==
- Franz Kafka (1883–1924)
- Siegfried Kapper (1821–1879), poet, writer, translator
- Jiří Karásek ze Lvovic (1871–1951)
- Egon Kisch (1885–1948), German-language writer
- Václav Kliment Klicpera (1792–1859), playwright
- Ivan Klíma (1931–2025), novelist and playwright
- Ladislav Klíma (1878–1928), philosopher and novelist
- Václav František Kocmánek (1607–1679)
- Pavel Kohout (born 1928), novelist, playwright, and poet
- Ján Kollár (1793–1852), Slovak poet
- Jan Amos Komenský (1592–1670)
- Karel Konrád (1899–1971)
- Vladimír Körner (born 1939), novelist
- Kosmas (c. 1045 – 1125)
- Petr Král (born 1941)
- Eliška Krásnohorská (1847–1926)
- Jiří Kratochvil (born 1940)
- Jan Křesadlo (1926–1995)
- Tomáš Krystlík (born 1947)
- Milan Kundera (1929–2023)

== L ==
- František Langer (1888–1965), dramatist and prose writer
- Květa Legátová (1919–2012), novelist and writer
- Paul Leppin (1878–1945), German-language writer
- Gustav Leutelt (1860–1947), German-language writer
- Věra Linhartová (1938–2026), writer, art historian
- Bohuslav Hasištejnský z Lobkovic (1461-1510), poet, essayist, philosopher, the "Czech Ulysses"
- Arnošt Lustig (1926–2011), novelist, short story writer and dramatist
- Óndra Łysohorsky (1905–1989), poet

== M ==
- Karel Hynek Mácha (1810–1836)
- Josef Svatopluk Machar (1864–1942)
- Jiří Mahen (1882–1939)
- Marie Majerová (1882–1967), novelist.
- Jiří Marek (1914–1994), writer, journalist, screenwriter
- Rudolf Medek (1890–1940)
- Adam Václav Michna z Otradovic (1600–1676), composer and organ player
- Daniel Micka (born 1963), writer and translator from English
- Libuše Moníková (1945–1998), German-language writer
- Vilém Mrštík (1863–1912), novelist
- Jiří Mucha (1915–1991)

== N ==
- Ondřej Neff (born 1945)
- Vladimír Neff (1909–1983)
- Božena Němcová (1820–1862)
- Ludvík Němec (born 1957), novelist.
- Jan Neruda (1834–1891)
- Josef Nesvadba (1926–2005)
- Stanislav Kostka Neumann (1875–1947), poet and novelist.
- Vítězslav Nezval (1900–1958)
- Arne Novák (1880–1939)
- Teréza Nováková (1853–1912), feminist, writer and editor.
- Karel Nový (1890–1980)

== O ==
- Ivan Olbracht (1882–1952), writer, journalist and translator.
- Jiří Orten (1919–1941), poet.
- Jan Otčenášek (1924–1979), novelist and playwright.

== P ==
- František Palacký (1798–1876), historian
- Vladimír Páral (born 1932), novelist
- Ota Pavel (1930–1973)
- Jan Pelc (born 1957)
- Ferdinand Peroutka (1895–1978)
- Josef Věromír Pleva (1899–1985)
- Alexej Pludek (1923–2002)
- Hynek z Poděbrad (1452–1492)
- Karel Poláček (1892–1945)
- Gabriela Preissová (1862–1946)
- Lenka Procházková (born 1951), prose writer

== R ==
- Karel Václav Rais (1859–1926), realist novelist, author of the so-called country prose, numerous books for youth and children, and several poems
- Bohuslav Reynek (1892–1971)
- Sylvie Richterová (born 1945), poet and literary scholar
- Jaroslav Rudiš (born 1972), writer, journalist and musician.

== S ==
- Petr Šabach (1951–2017)
- Pavel Josef Šafařík (1795–1861), Slovak Slavicist, literary historian, and poet
- František Xaver Šalda (1867–1937), critic and essayist.
- Zdena Salivarová (1933–2025), writer, translator and publisher
- Michal Šanda (born 1965)
- Prokop František Šedivý (1764 – c. 1810), playwright, actor, and translator of the National Revival era
- Jaroslav Seifert (1901–1986)
- Ondřej Sekora (1899–1967), writer, journalist, cartoonist, illustrator, caricaturist, graphic
- Karol Sidon (born 1942)
- Jan Skácel (1922–1989)
- Vladimír Škutina (1931–1995)
- Josef Škvorecký (1924–2012)
- Josef Václav Sládek (1845–1912), poet.
- Ladislav Smoček (born 1932), playwright and theater director
- Antonín Sova (1864–1928), Impressionist and Symbolist poet
- Fráňa Šrámek (1877–1952), anarchist, impressionist, and vitalist, poet, novelist, and dramatist
- Pavel Šrut (1940–2018)
- Petr Stančík (born 1968)
- Antal Stašek (1843–1931)
- Vladimír Šlechta (born 1960)
- Ela Stein-Weissberger (1930–2018), biographer
- Jan Nepomuk Štěpánek (1783–1844), playwright
- Tomáš Štítný ze Štítného (c. 1333 – 1401/09)
- Eduard Štorch (1878–1956)
- Františka Stránecká (1839–1888), writer and collector of Moravian folklore
- Ladislav Stroupežnický (1850–1892)
- Karolína Světlá (1830–1899)
- Růžena Svobodová (1868–1920)
- Emil Synek (1903–1993), playwright, novelist, and biographer

== T ==
- Karel Teige (1900–1951), art critic, journalist, and translator
- Felix Téver (1852 - 1932), pen name of Anna Lauermannová-Mikšová, writer and literary salon host
- Jindra Tichá (born 1937), writer and academic
- Pavel Tigrid (1917–2003), political journalist and essayist.
- Jan Tománek (born 1978) - Movie director and writer
- Filip Topol (1965–2013)
- Jáchym Topol (born 1962)
- Josef Topol (born 1935), playwright.
- Václav Beneš Třebízský (1849–1884)
- Josef Kajetán Tyl (1808–1856), playwright, writer and actor.

== U ==
- Milan Uhde (born 1936), playwright and politician.
- Ota Ulč (1930–2022), Czech-American author and columnist
- Hermann Ungar (1893–1929), German-language writer
- Eli Urbanová (1922–2012), Esperantist novelist and poet

== V ==
- Josef Váchal (1884–1969)
- Ludvík Vaculík (1926–2015)
- Edvard Valenta (1901–1978)
- Vladislav Vančura (1891–1942)
- Fan Vavřincová (1917–2012)
- Jaroslav Velinský (1932–2012)
- Michal Viewegh (born 1962)
- Johannes von Tepl (c. 1350 – c. 1415)
- Jiří Voskovec (1905–1981)
- Alena Vostrá (1938–1992), novelist
- Jaroslav Vrchlický (1853–1912)

== W ==
- Alena Wagnerová (born 1936)
- Magdalena Wagnerová (born 1960), writer and editor
- Jiří Weil (1900–1959)
- Richard Weiner (1884–1937)
- Jan Weiss (1892–1972)
- Jiří Weiss (1913–2004)
- Franz Werfel (1890–1945)
- Ivan Wernisch (born 1942)
- Zikmund Winter (1846–1912)
- Jana Witthedová (born 1948)
- Jiří Wolker (1900–1924)

== Z ==
- Jan Zábrana (1931–1984)
- Jan Zahradníček (1905–1960)
- Pavel Zajíček (born 1951)
- Vojtěch Zamarovský (1919–2006)
- Antonín Zápotocký (1884–1957)
- Julius Zeyer (1841–1901), poet, dramatist and novelist.
- Miroslav Zikmund (1919–2021)
- Karel Zlín (born 1937)
- Anna Zonová (born 1962)

== See also ==
- List of Czech women writers
