= Šedivý =

Šedivý (feminine: Šedivá) is a Czech surname. Notable people with the surname include:

- Eduard Šedivý (born 1992), Slovak ice hockey player
- Irena Šedivá (born 1992), Czech athlete
- Jan Šedivý (born 1984), Czech orienteer
- Jaroslav Šedivý (1929–2023), Czech politician
- Jaroslav Erno Šedivý (born 1947), Czech rock drummer
- Jiří Šedivý (born 1963), Czech politician
- Jiří Šedivý (general) (born 1953), Czech general
- Marie Šedivá (1908–1975), Czech fencer
- Peter Šedivý (born 1983), Slovak footballer
- Prokop František Šedivý (1764 – c. 1810), Czech playwright
