= Blatný =

Blatný (feminine: Blatná) is a Czech surname. Notable people with the surname include:

- Fanni Blatny (1873–1949), Czech politician
- František Blatný (1933–2015), Czech chess player, referee and coach
- Jan Blatný (born 1970), Czech medical doctor and politician
- Ivan Blatný (1919–1990), Czech poet
- Lev Blatný (1894–1930), Czech poet
- Pavel Blatný (born 1968), Czech chess player
- Zdeněk Blatný (born 1981), Czech ice hockey player

== See also ==
- Blatná, a town in the Czech Republic
