= Křepice =

Křepice may refer to places in the Czech Republic:

- Křepice (Břeclav District), a municipality and village in the South Moravian Region
- Křepice (Znojmo District), a municipality and village in the South Moravian Region
- Křepice, a village and part of Stožice in the South Bohemian Region
