= Josef Holeček =

Josef Holeček may refer to:

- Josef Holeček (canoeist) (1921–2005), Czech sprint canoeist
- Josef Holeček (writer) (1853–1929), Czech writer
