= Heinsch (disambiguation) =

Heinsch is a white grape variety.

Heinsch may also refer to:

- Johann Georg Heinsch (1647–1712), Czech-German artist
- Jürgen Heinsch (1940–2022), German football player and trainer
