= Jan Jiří Heinsch =

Czech-German Baroque style artist

Jan Jiří Hein(t)sch
- Born: c. 1647; Kłodzko, Bohemia, Crown of Bohemia (now Poland)
- Died: September 9, 1712 (aged c. 65); Prague, Bohemia, Crown of Bohemia (now Czech Republic)
- Known for: Painting, Engraving
- Movement: Baroque

Jan Jiří Heinsch or Heintsch (German: Johann Georg Heinsch; c. 1647 – September 9, 1712) was a Czech-German Baroque style artist. Heinsch primarily painted religious-themed works (including altarpieces) as well as portraits of monastic superiors – especially for various Catholic religious orders such as the Jesuits, Knights of the Cross with the Red Star or Augustinians. He is known to have produced around 150 paintings and, in addition, extensive graphic work.

== Life ==
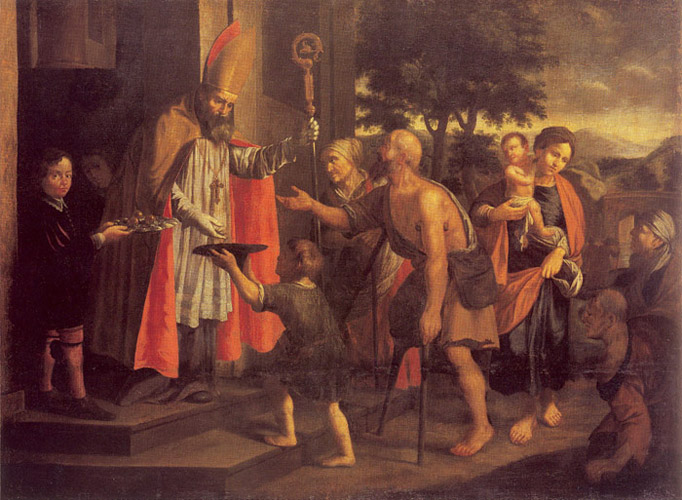
Saint Nicholas Gives Alms (1685)

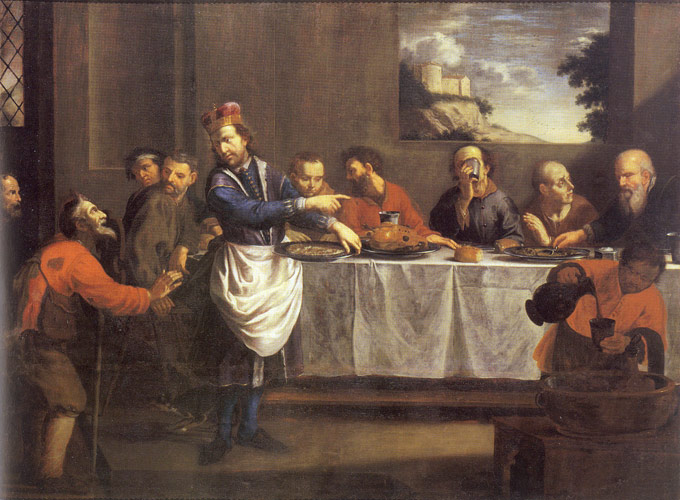
Saint Wenceslaus is Serving the Paupers by the Table (1685)

Heinsch was born in 1647 in Kłodzko (Glatz), the capital of the County of Kladsko (then part of Bohemia proper, now in Silesia, southern Poland), to a Protestant family. He lived there until at least 1678, when he moved to Prague. It is not certain where he gained a painting education in his early years. In Prague, where he joined local painters' guilds while converted to Catholicism, he learned the art of one of the best Czech Baroque painters, Karel Škréta (whom he took as his lifelong pattern); to a lesser extent was also influenced by the Italian Renaissance, particularly by Paolo Veronese. As for themes of paintings, Heinsch was inspired by thoughts of polymaths and divines Bohuslav Balbín or Jan František Beckovský.

In 1708, he entered the Augustinian monastery in Bělá pod Bezdězem in northern Bohemia, but before the end of the trial period he left; yet later painted several works for this institution.

Heinsch died in Prague on September 9, 1712.

== Works ==
In 1705, he painted one of his most renowned pictures – Saint Luke painting the Madonna. In 1707, together with Jan Kryštof Liška, he worked on a series of portraits of the Grand Masters of the Red Star Crusaders, where the most successful is the portrait of the former Grand Master George Ignatius Pospíchal (1694–1699). In 1710, produced the design for a statue of St. Francis Borgia on the Charles Bridge, but it was later sculpted by another Czech-German artist, Ferdinand Maxmilián Brokoff.

His monumental painting « Jesus after the fast served by angels » can be seen at the Strahov monastery in Prague.

In addition to painting, Heinsch published several copperplate engraving illustrations. Notable are the ones featured in Societas Jesu Apostolorum imitatrix by Matthias Tanner. These illustrations depicted Jesuits' heroic deeds in the Americas and elsewhere. One example is his illustration of Fr. Andrew White who assisted the Catholics in Maryland during its founding.

In addition to Prague, his legacy is scattered throughout Bohemia and some examples also can be found in southern Moravia (churches in Brno and Uherské Hradiště).
