= Marie Heritesová =

Czech violinist

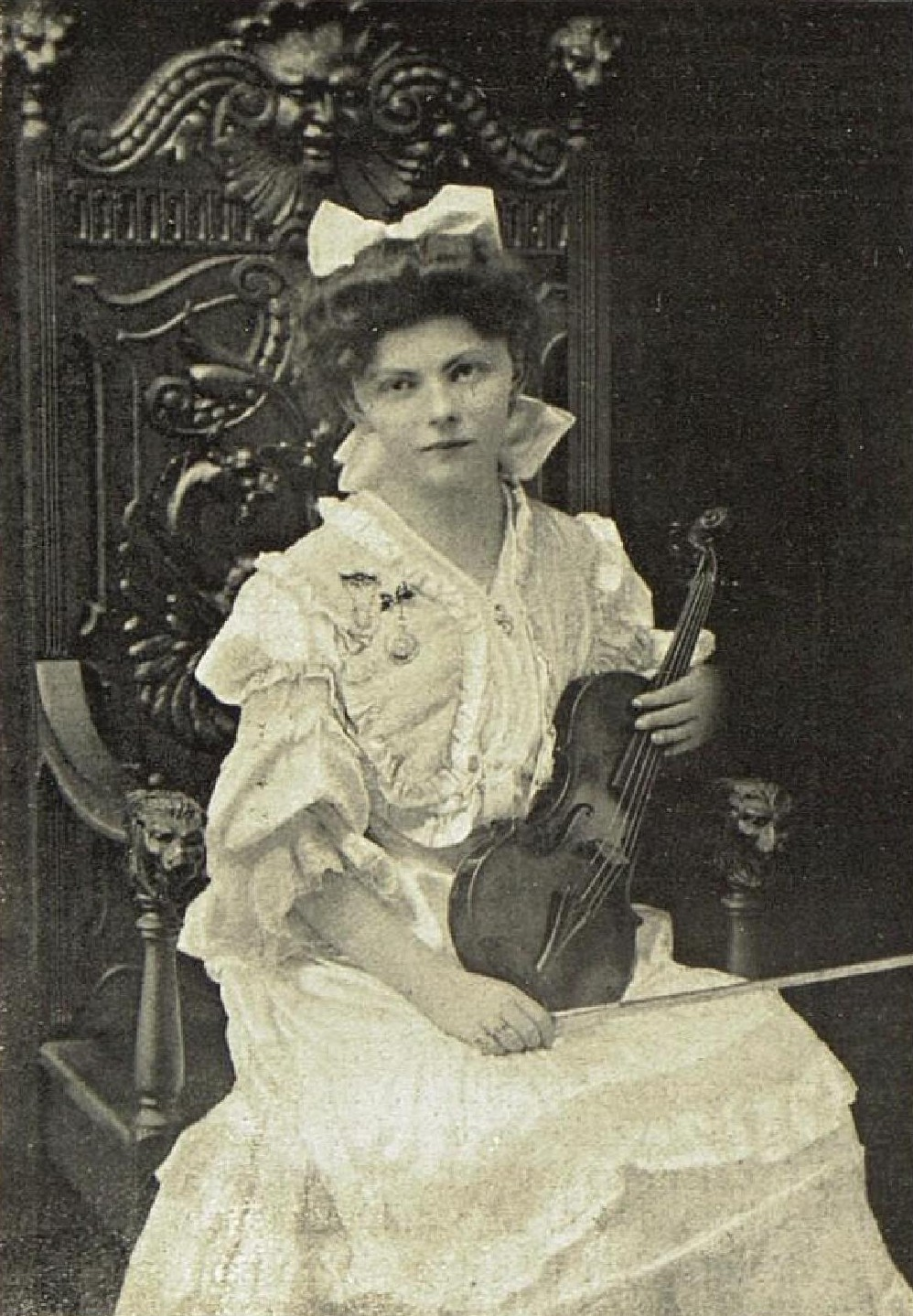
- Marie Heritesová with her violin.
- Born: Marie Antonie Heritesová; 23 March 1881; Vodňany, Bohemia, Austria-Hungary
- Died: 13 July 1970 (aged 89); Gulfport, Florida, United States
- Other names: M. Heritesova-Kohnova, Marie Herites-Khonova
- Occupation: violinist

Marie Heritesová (23 March 1881 – 13 July 1970), known as Madame Kohnova in the United States, was a Czech violinist and violin teacher.

== Early life ==
Marie Antonie Heritesová was born on 23 March 1881 at house No. 1 in Vodňany, Bohemia, Austria-Hungary, the daughter of writer and pharmacist František Herites. She was baptized Catholic the next day. As a girl she lived in Cleveland, Ohio with her family for a time, and studied violin there. On their return to Europe in 1894, she pursued further musical studies with Otakar Ševčík at the conservatory in Prague.

== Career ==
Heritesová debuted as a concert violinist in the Rudolfinum in Prague, in 1902. She was invited to play at the Victor Hugo centenary observances in Paris, and at the festivities around the coronation of Edward VII in England. She toured in Europe and accompanied singer Marie Gorlenko-Doline in Russia. She was a soloist with the Czech Philharmonic. In 1904, she traveled again to the United States, this time on a concert tour with pianist Jan Heřman. The duo played at the Louisiana Purchase Exposition in St. Louis during this tour. She made two gramophone recordings in Prague after 1909.

In the United States again during World War I, this time as a widow with a daughter, she taught violin at Northwestern Conservatory of Music in Minneapolis, and the Texas Woman's University in Denton, Texas, where she was head of the violin department. She gave a recital at Coe College in Iowa during the 1916–1917 season. In 1919 she appeared as M. Heritesova-Kohnova in a list of members of the Society for the Advancement of Slavic Study, an American organization. Also in 1919, she supported a fellow Czech musician, singer Emmy Destinn, in a concert in Dallas. A 1935 reviewer credited her performance with "deep insight and interpretive power."

== Personal life ==
In 1905, Marie Heritesová married Josef E. Kohn, an American industrialist; she used the married surname Kohnová. Kohn died in 1910, and Heritesová returned to her family in Prague and Vodňany with her young daughter, Marie (1906-2008). She left as World War I began, fearful that their American citizenship would become hazardous in Central Europe. Her daughter married Frank Holecek in Chicago, the nephew of František Herites' friend, writer Josef Holeček.

Kohnova died in Gulfport, Pinellas County, Florida in 1970, aged 89 years.
