= Anna Regina Husová =

Czech teacher and writer (1857–1945)

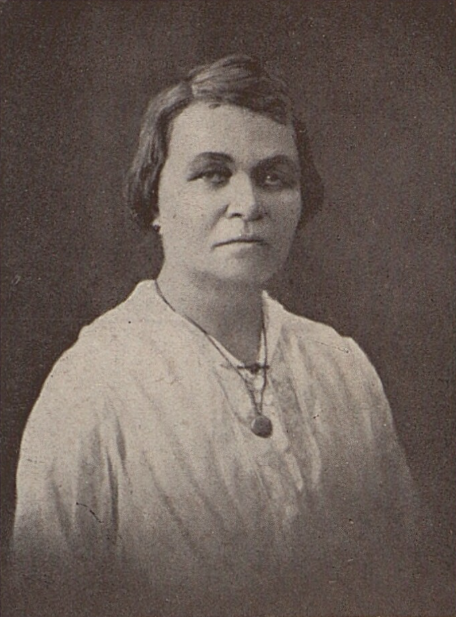
- Husová in 1927
- Born: 22 September 1857; Chřešťovice, Bohemia, Austrian Empire
- Died: 16 April 1945 (aged 87); Písek, Protectorate of Bohemia and Moravia
- Burial place: Svatotrojické cemetery
- Education: Czech Institute for the Education of Teachers
- Occupations: Teacher, author, cultural historian

Anna Regina Husová (22 September 1857 – 16 April 1945) was a Czech teacher, writer and cultural historian.

== Biography ==
She was born in Chřešťovice (today part of Albrechtice nad Vltavou, Czech Republic) to the military veteran Josef Husa and Anna Veronika Husová-Šamanová. Her brother Josef Ján Husa (1863–1930) became a teacher in Benátky nad Jizerou.

From 1873 to 1875, Husová attended the Municipal Girls' School in Písek, where she earned the highest grades. Then she went to the Czech Institute for the Education of Teachers in Prague until 1879 where she achieved excellent results and even received a scholarship in her last year. She passed the maturity test on 29 June 1879 and received a maturity certificate for general schools.

She began her teaching career in Protivín. At her next school, in Vodňany, she became friends with writer František Herites. In 1889, she returned to the bourgeois girls' school in Písek, where she worked for 37 years before retiring in 1926. She was appointed as "the definitive teacher for the grammar-history department" on 15 December 1894. During her school years, she received several commendations from educational authorities, for example in 1912, she was lauded by the district school board in Písek "... for her zealous and in every way successful work in the school service..." On 26 November 1920, her "crowning achievement" was being appointed the permanent headmistress of the civil school for girls in Písek.

=== Collections ===
She was an accomplished traveler and collected the folk clothing of the Prácheňsko region – mainly women's holiday or ceremonial clothing. Together with her friend Emilie Fryšová, she managed a clothing collection. Husová also collected South Bohemian fairy tales, nursery rhymes, legends and songs, and she authored many books for children and young people, featuring social themes, patriotism, home, honesty and hard work, as well as positive human feelings. Her work was characterized by natural motifs and educational themes.

She was an active member of the local associations: "Světlá" Ladies' and Girls' Association of Písek and the Central Union of Pisek Female Teachers, union in Písek. Close friends were: Emílie Fryšová (1840–1920), František Herites (1851–1929), Eliška Krásnohorská (1847–1926), Tereza Sedláčková-Barcalová (1883), and Vilma Seidlová-Sokolová (1859–1941).

Husová never married and died in Písek on 16 April 1945. She was buried in the local Svatotrojické cemetery.

== Works ==
Husová wrote many books for young people and children as well as music and journal articles.

=== Prose ===
- In the magic set - fairy tales. Prague: Mamert Knapp, 1890
- The White Veil: a story for young people. Prague: M. Knapp, 1890
- Báchorky, fables and stories for small children - freely translated by Josef Věnceslav Vlasák according to Robert Niedergesäss. A few stories about plants - Anna R. Husová. Prague: M. Knapp, 1892
- On the coast of East Africa. 1897
- František Vlasák tells the story of the life of the old Czechs - mainly according to Bohuslav Balbín to the youth.
- Colorful flowers - short stories by AR Husová. Prague: M. Knapp, 1893
- Short stories - Písek: Jaroslav Burian, 1895
- Adventures of the lost boy: short story - Písek: J. Burian, 1895
- From forest wanderings – Sand: J. Burian, 1896
- The Second Libuše: a story for young people - illustrated by Karel Ladislav Thuma. Velké Meziříčí : Šašek and Frgala, 1900
- Under the girl's stone: a story for young people - illustrated by KL Thuma. Velké Meziříčí: Šašek and Frgala, 1900
- From the fairy tale realm - Velké Meziříčí: Jester and Frgala, 1900
- Flowers of the heart: a set of short stories for young people - Písek: J. Burian, 1901
- My Father's Tales - Illustrated by KL Thuma. Sand: J. Burian, 1903
- From a forest still life - Velké Meziříčí: Šašek and Frgala, 1903
- The smile of youth. From the first holidays: memories of little girls - illustrated by Pavel Körber. Velké Meziříčí: Alois Šašek, 1905
- Tales from Jesus: fairy tales and fairy tales - Prague: Emil Šolc, 1907; Rudolf Storch, 1909
- Fairy tales from our cottage - fairy tales and fairy tales. Prague: Emil Šolc, 1907; R. Storch, 1909
- In a fairytale setting: to the illustrations of master Mikuláš Aleš - Velké Meziříčí: A. Šašek, 1909
- Between fairies and dwarfs: fairy tales and fairy tales - Prague: R. Storch, 1909
- On the way to work: a short story for young people - Prague: Šolc and Šimáček, 1919
- Mrs. Věra: a story from life - Prague: Cyrillo-Methodějská knihtiskárna and václav Kotrba publishing house, 1934
- Fateful meetings - [In the time of roses: Husová ...] Třebíč: Akcent, 2013

=== Articles ===
- The former national costume of girls in Písecko. Lada. Fiction and fashion magazine, 1889, vol. I, No. 7
- A piece of the past. Ottawa, 1912, vol. XXXIV., No. 30 and 31
- Our folk costumes. Guide to the agrarian museum jubilee landscape exhibition in the kr. m. Písku 1912
- Working with the "Gina" brand. Magazine of Czech female teachers, 1913, No. 10
- Písecky national costume. Ottawa, 22/02/1919, year III., number 8–9, pp. 99–100
- Costume of boys and men in Písecko. Ottawa, 24/03/1921, year V., number 7–9, p. 105
- From family memories. Ottawa, 1929, vol. XII., pp. 147–148
- Folk songs from around Píseck. Písecký obzor, 1932, vol. III., No. 1

=== Music ===
- O Lady of Love: prayer for middle voice with ref. organ: op. 5 – Jaroslav Mácha. Prague: Václav Kotrba, 1911
- Four Marian prayers for the homeland and the nation. III., Our Lady, op. 68/B – Jaroslav Mácha. Prague: František Augustin Urbanek and sons, 1946
- Holy Mother: op. 68b – Jaroslav Mácha. Prague: František A. Urbanek and sons, 1946
