= Anna Zonová =

Czech writer (born 1962)

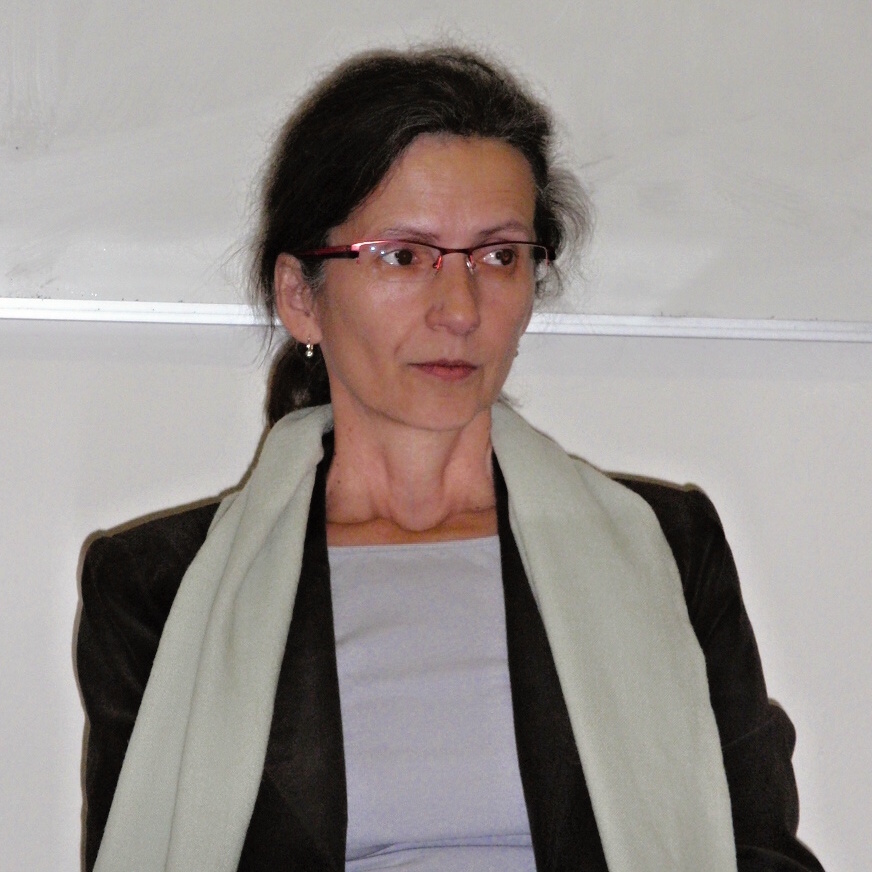
Anna Zonová in 2012

Anna Zonová (born 24 April 1962) is a Czech writer.

She was born in Nižný Komárnik and studied civil engineering at the Brno University of Technology. Zonová began writing art reviews in various cultural journals. In 2001, she published a collection of short stories Červené botičky (Red Shoes). She curates art exhibitions and publishes articles in the journal Literární noviny. Since 1994, she has presented exhibitions of contemporary art in the church at Moravský Beroun.

== Selected works ==
- Za trest a za odměnu, novel (2004)
- Boty a značky, novella (2007)
- Lorenz, zrady, novel (2013)
