= Zvuk slunečních hodin =

2001 novel by Hana Andronikova

First edition (publ. Knižní klub)

Zvuk slunečních hodin (lit. "The Sound of the Sundial") is a Czech novel, written by Hana Andronikova. It was first published by the publishing house Petrov (Brno), in 2001. It is about a family traveling from Zlin, Andronikova's hometown, to India, the United States, and Auschwitz.
