= Ivan Blatný =

Czech poet (1919–1990)

Ivan Blatný (Czech pronunciation: [ˈɪvan ˈblatniː]; 21 December 1919 – 5 August 1990) was a Czech poet. He was a member of the Group 42 (Skupina 42).

== Life ==
Blatný was born on 21 December 1919 in Brno, Czechoslovakia. He the son of the writer Lev Blatný. He was a member of the Group 42 (Skupina 42), association of Czech modern artists.

In March 1948, after the communist seizure of power in his native country, Blatný left his country - just one of many figures in Czech Literature who chose to emigrate rather than go underground. However, he found life in exile difficult, as did many other émigré Czech writers such as Ivan Diviš. During his subsequent life in the United Kingdom, he spent time in various mental hospitals, suffering from a paranoid fear that StB agents would kidnap him back to Czechoslovakia.

From 1984 until shortly before his death, he lived in a retirement home in Clacton-on-Sea. He died on 5 August 1990 in Colchester. A plaque commemorating his stay can be seen on the wall of the Edensor Care Home in Orwell Road. His ashes were taken to the Brno Central Cemetery.

In 2017 a new road on the site of the old St Clements Hospital in Ipswich was named Ivan Blatny Close in memory of the one time resident.

== Work ==
At the beginning of his career, Blatný mostly wrote using conventional rhyming and rhythmic forms such as alexandrine quatrains, most notably in the Brno Elegies (Czech: Melancholické procházky; Prague: Melantrich, 1941). The correct translation of the Czech title is 'Melancholic Walks', but Blatný's original title Brněnské elegie was forbidden by the war-time censor for its suggestion that the poet might have been regretful about the German invasion of Czechoslovakia. The poems themselves make no reference whatsoever to contemporary events, but concentrate on Brno and its hinterland, with a beautiful hypnotic lyricism.

=== Publications ===
- Melancholické procházky (Prague: Melantrich, 1941)
- Tento večer (1945)
- Hledání přítomného času (1947)
- Stará bydliště (1979)
- Pomocná škola Bixley (1979; Praha: KDM 1982)
- Ivan Blatný: The Drug of Art. Selected Poems, ed. Veronika Tuckerová (New York: Ugly Duckling Presse, 2007). Translations by Anna Moschovakis, Matthew Sweney, Justin Quinn, Veronika Tuckerová, Alex Zucker.

== See also ==
- List of Czech writers
