= Čeněk Zíbrt =

Czech ethnographer and historian (1864–1932)

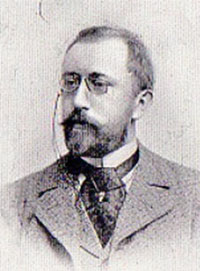

Čeněk Zíbrt (1864–1932) was a Czech ethnographer and historian, specializing in folk culture. He corresponded for a long time with Emilie Fryšová when she was assembling ethnographic artifacts for her museum in Písek. On his advice, she donated the most valuable parts of her collections to the National Museum.

== Publications ==
- "Jak se kdy v Čechách tancovalo: dějiny tance v Čechách, na Moravě, ve Slezsku a na Slovensku z věkǔ nejstarších až do nové doby se zvláštním Zřetelem k dějinám tance vǔbec (Google eBook)
