= Jelena Mašínová =

Czech screenwriter (1941–2024)

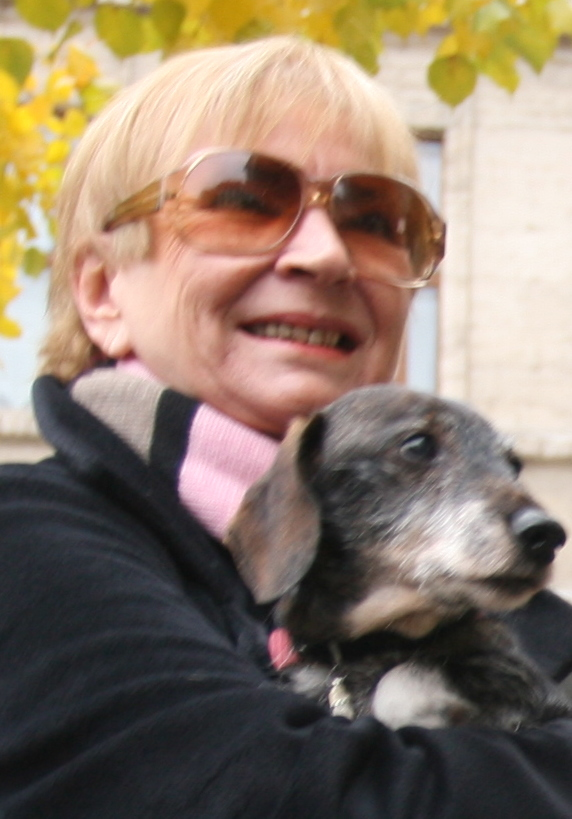
- Mašínová in 2007
- Born: 14 October 1941; Prague, Protectorate of Bohemia and Moravia
- Died: 8 December 2024 (aged 83); Prague, Czech Republic
- Occupations: Screenwriter; Editor; Writer
- Spouse: Pavel Kohout (m. 1970)

Jelena Mašínová (14 October 1941 – 8 December 2024) was a Czech screenwriter, editor and writer. She was the third wife of the Czech poet Pavel Kohout.

== Life and career ==
Mašínová was born in Prague on 14 October 1941. In the 1960s, she was the editor of the Orbius film and theater editorial office. She then studied dramaturgy at the Film and TV School of the Academy of Performing Arts in Prague. From 1968, after the occupation of Czechoslovakia, all activities were prohibited. Towards the end of 1970, Mašínová married Czech poet Pavel Kohout, thus becoming his third wife. They collaborated on various screenplays and books together. According to them, the films Hodina tance a lásky, Nápady svaté Kláry and the TV series Konec velkých prázdnin were created.

Both Mašínová and Kohout were among the signatories of Charter 77. In 1978, the couple worked together in Austria. However, the communist regime subsequently made it impossible for them to return to Czechoslovakia. Two years later, they obtained Austrian citizenship and were again able to travel between the countries.

In addition to screenplays, Mašínová also wrote theatre and radio plays. In 2011, she celebrated her 70th birthday. Subsequently, the book Skytá hvězda Jelena Mašínová was published, which maps her life's work.

Mašínová died on 8 December 2024 in Prague, where she lived with her husband for a long time. She was 83. Her husband, Pavel Kohout, and niece, Jolana, announced her death. Her funeral took place on 11 December, with a closed family gathering at Vyšehrad Cemetery.

== Filmography ==
=== Film ===
- 7 zabitých (1965)
- Nápady svaté Kláry (1980)
- Hodina pravdy (2000)
- P.F. 77 (2003)
- Hodina tance a lásky (2003)
- 10 způsobů lásky (2008)
- Cizinec a krásná paní (2011)

=== Television ===
- Konec velkých prázdnin (1996)
