= Justin Quinn =

Irish poet and critic (born 1968)

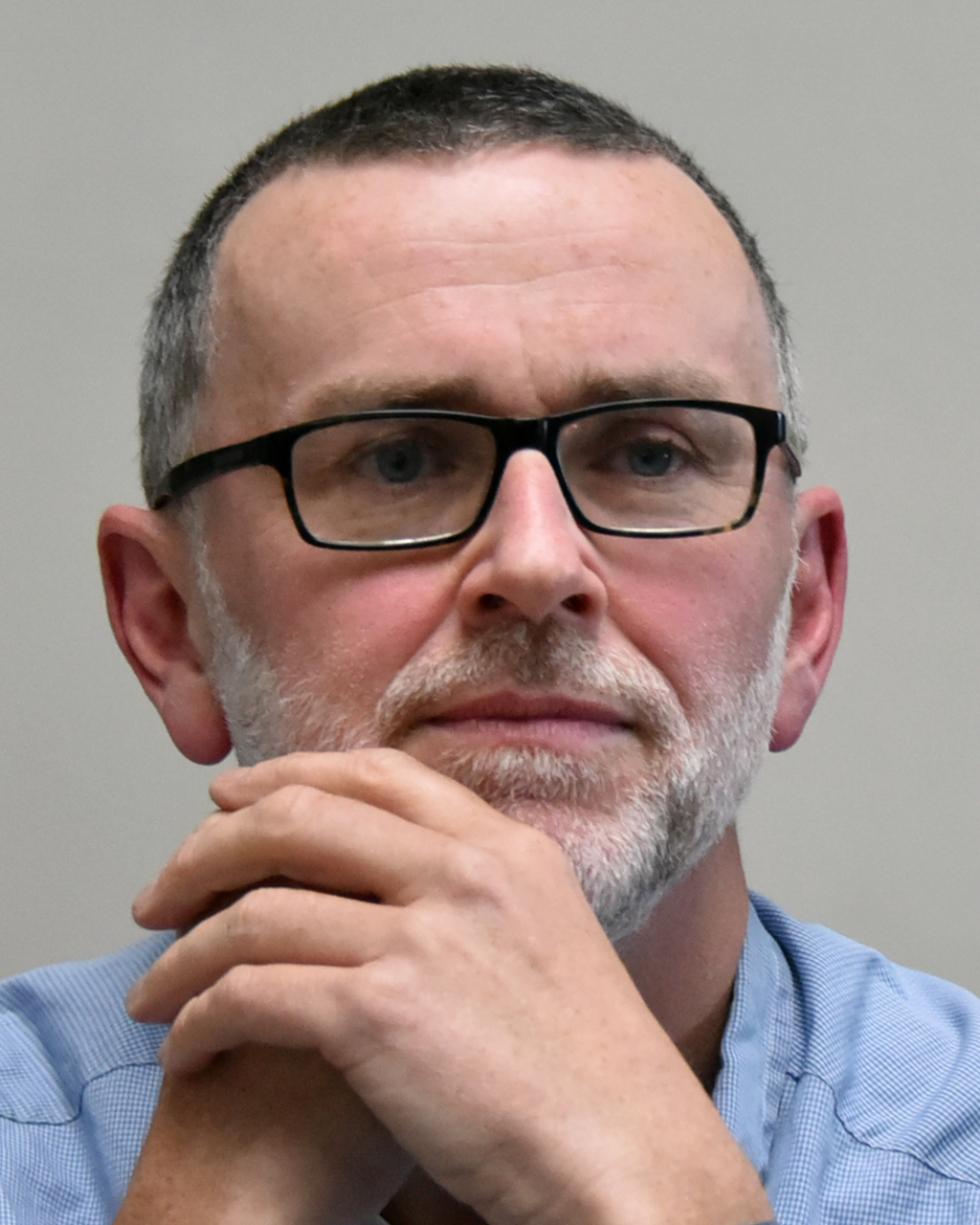
Justin Quinn in 2019

Justin Quinn (born 1968 in Dublin) is an Irish poet and critic. He received a doctorate from Trinity College, Dublin, where his contemporaries included poets David Wheatley, Caitriona O'Reilly and Sinéad Morrissey, and now lives with his wife and sons in Prague. He is a lecturer at Charles University and the University of West Bohemia.

He has published seven poetry collections: The 'O'o'a'a' Bird (1995), Privacy (1999), Fuselage (2002), Waves & Trees (2006), The Months (2009), Close Quarters (2011) and Early House (2015). The 'O'o'a'a' Bird was nominated for the Forward Poetry Prize for Best First Collection.

With David Wheatley, he was a founding editor of the influential journal Metre, which stressed internationalism and contributed to a burgeoning interest in formalism in Irish poetry. He has published three critical studies, Gathered Beneath the Storm: Wallace Stevens, Nature and Community, American Errancy: Empire, Sublimity and Modern Poetry and Between Two Fires: Transnationalism and Cold War Poetry. He has also translated extensively from Czech, in particular the work of Petr Borkovec and Bohuslav Reynek, and has written non-fiction prose on life in the Czech Republic for the Dublin Review.

Quinn's work shows the influence of American writers such as, principally, Wallace Stevens, but also Anthony Hecht and James Merrill, as well as Irish writers such as W. B. Yeats and Paul Muldoon. It is characterised by a sensual lushness informed by an awareness of the violence of history, as inflected by the author's experiences of living in the Czech Republic. In its mix of formalist sophistication and openness to experiment, Quinn's work confounds perceptions of Irish poetry as rigidly dichotomised between formal conservatism and 1930s-derived innovation, a distinctiveness confirmed by the editorial decision to award him the single largest share of the 2004 Bloodaxe anthology The New Irish Poets.

He has recently translated the work of Czech poet Ivan Blatný.

== Books ==
=== Poetry ===
- The 'O'o'a'a' Bird (Carcanet, 1995)
- Privacy (Carcanet, 1999)
- Fuselage (Gallery Press, 2002)
- Waves and Trees (Gallery Press, 2006)
- The Months (2009)
- Close Quarters (Gallery Press, 2011)
- Early House (Gallery Press, 2015)
- Shallow Seas (Gallery Press, 2020)

=== Novel ===
- Mount Merrion (Penguin Ireland, 2013)

=== Criticism ===
- Gathered Beneath the Storm: Wallace Stevens, Nature and Community (UCD Press, 2002)
- American Errancy: Empire, Sublimity and Modern Poetry (UCD Press, 2005)
- The Cambridge Introduction to Modern Irish Poetry, 1800-2000 (Cambridge UP, 2008)
- Between Two Fires: Transnationalism and Cold War Poetry (Oxford, 2015).

=== Translations ===
- The Drug of Art: Selected Poems of Ivan Blatný (trs Justin Quinn et al., Ugly Duckling Presse, 2007)
- Petr Borkovec: From the Interior, Poems 1995-2005 (Seren, 2008)
- Bohuslav Reynek: The Well at Morning: Selected Poems 1925-1971 (University of Chicago Press, 2018)
- Jan Zábrana: The Lesser Histories (University of Chicago Press, 2023)

=== Art books ===
- Jiří Mědílek, Obrazy (Prague: Opus, 2008)
