= Hana Andronikova =

Czech writer and playwright (1967–2011)

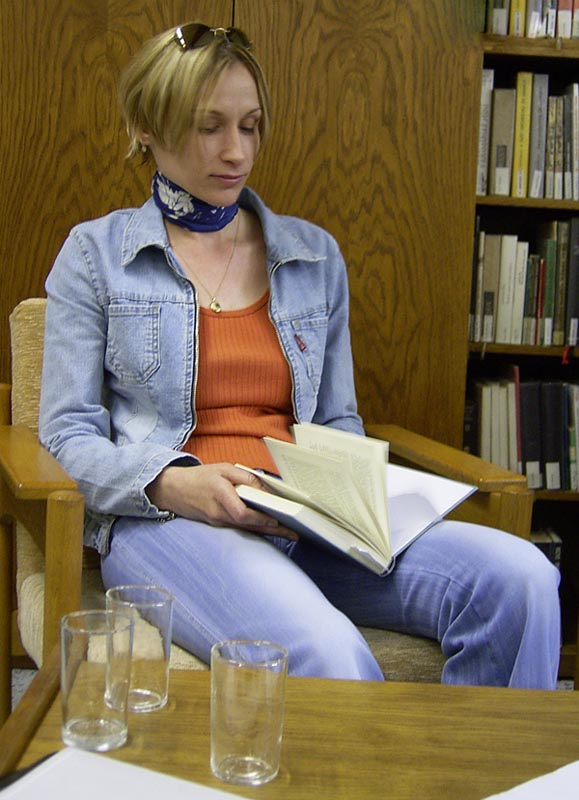
Hana Andronikova

Hana Andronikova (9 September 1967 – 20 December 2011) was a Czech writer.

Andronikova was born in Zlín. After attending high school in Zlín, she studied English and Czech at the Faculty of Arts of the Charles University in Prague. Both her novels – Zvuk slunečních hodin ("The Sound of the Sundial") and Nebe nemá dno ("Heaven Has No Ground") – were awarded the Magnesia Litera book award in 2002 and 2011 (in different categories). She also wrote short stories and dramas. Andronikova was diagnosed with breast cancer in 2007. She chronicled her personal battle with the disease in her autobiographical novel, Nebe nemá dno. She died of cancer in December 2011, aged 44.

== See also ==
- List of Czech writers
