= Albrechtice nad Vltavou =

- Municipality
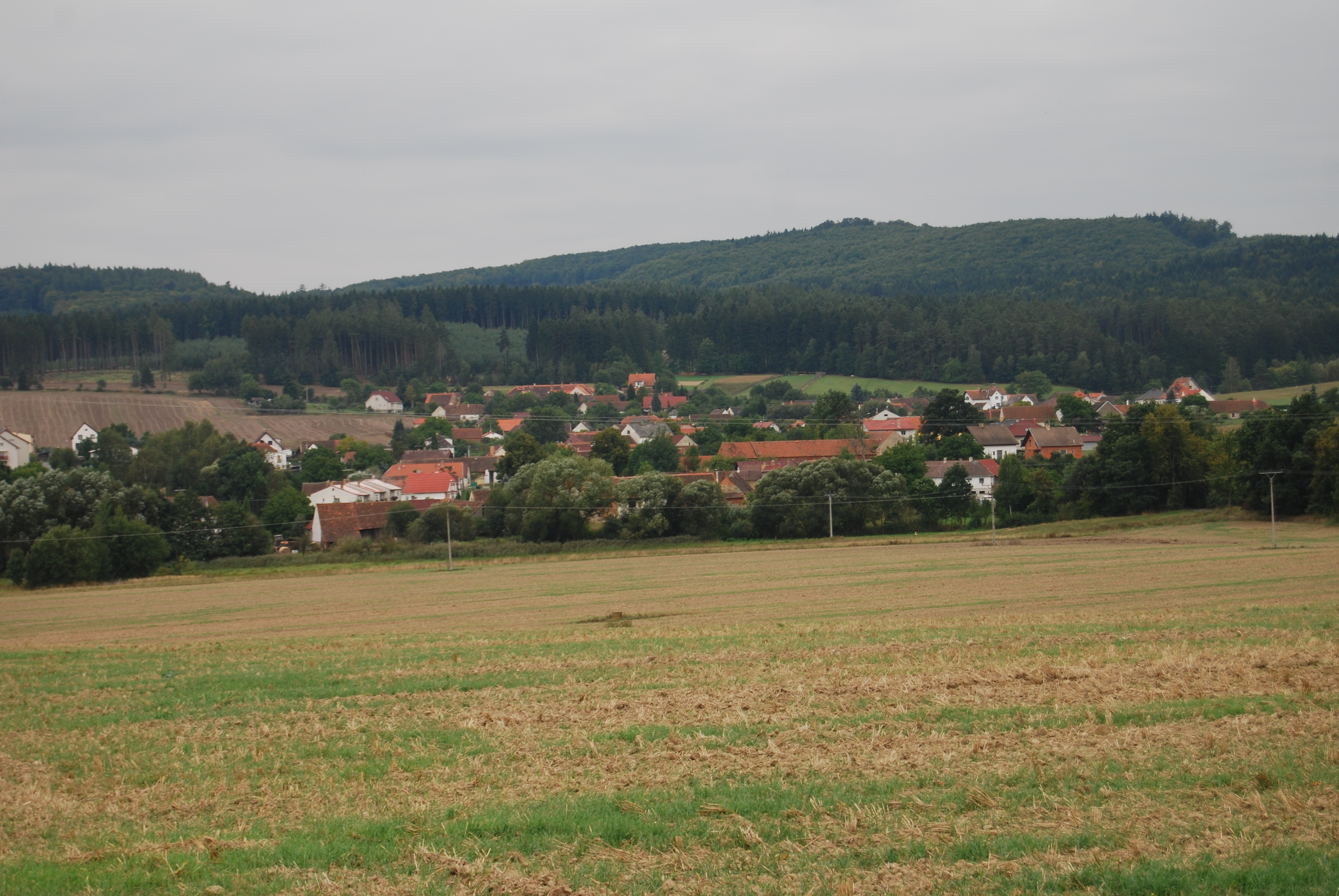
- Panorama of Albrechtice nad Vltavou

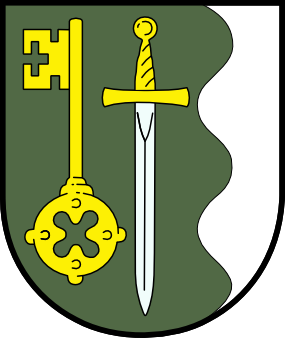
- Flag Coat of arms

- Location in the Czech Republic
- Coordinates: 49°15′12″N 14°18′10″E
- Country: Czech Republic
- Region: South Bohemian
- District: Písek
- First mentioned: 1352

Area
  - Total: 36.71 km^{2} (14.17 sq mi)
- Elevation: 428 m (1,404 ft)

Population (2026-01-01)
  - Total: 1,009
  - Density: 27.49/km^{2} (71.19/sq mi)
- Time zone: UTC+1 (CET)
  - Summer (DST): UTC+2 (CEST)
- Postal code: 398 16
- Website: www.albrechticenadvltavou.cz

Albrechtice nad Vltavou (German: Albrechtitz) is a municipality and village in Písek District in the South Bohemian Region of the Czech Republic. It has about 1,000 inhabitants.

== Administrative division ==
Albrechtice nad Vltavou consists of six municipal parts (in brackets population according to the 2021 census):

- Albrechtice nad Vltavou (433)
- Chřešťovice (171)
- Hladná (37)
- Jehnědno (117)
- Údraž (121)
- Újezd (51)

== Etymology ==
The name Albrechtice is derived from the personal name Albrecht, meaning "the village of Albrecht's people".

== Geography ==
Albrechtice nad Vltavou is located about 12 kilometres (7 mi) southeast of Písek and 32 km (20 mi) north of České Budějovice. It lies in the Tábor Uplands. The highest point is the hill Na Skalce at 533 m (1,749 ft) above sea level. The entire eastern municipal border is formed by the Vltava River.

== History ==
The first written mention of Albrechtice is from 1352. The church was first mentioned in 1360. In the second half of the 16th century, Albrechtice was owned by the Knights Oudražský of Kestřany. After the Battle of White Mountain in 1620, Albrechtice was acquired by Baltasar Marradas and joined to the Hluboká estate. Albrechtice was then a market town, but it was destroyed during the Thirty Years' War and in 1635, Albrechtice ceased to be a market town and became a village. In the following centuries, it was owned by various lesser nobles.

== Demographics ==
Historical population

Year	Pop.	±%
1869	2,601	—
1880	2,545	−2.2%
1890	2,378	−6.6%
1900	2,424	+1.9%
1910	2,445	+0.9%

Year	Pop.	±%
1921	2,342	−4.2%
1930	2,098	−10.4%
1950	1,711	−18.4%
1961	1,528	−10.7%
1970	1,333	−12.8%

Year	Pop.	±%
1980	1,079	−19.1%
1991	897	−16.9%
2001	807	−10.0%
2011	831	+3.0%
2021	930	+11.9%

Source: Censuses

== Transport ==
There are no railways or major roads passing through the municipality.

== Sights ==
The main landmark of Albrechtice nad Vltavou is the Church of Saints Peter and Paul It is a Romanesque church from the late 12th century with a churchyard. The walls of the churchyard have a unique arcade decoration with paintings and moralising verses from the 19th century.

== Notable people ==
- Anna Regina Husová (1857–1945), writer and cultural historian
