= Smyčka =

Smyčka (The Noose) is a Czech novel, written by Pavel Kohout. It was first published in 2008 by Pistorius & Olšanská.
