= Jan František Beckovský =

Czech historian & writer (1658–1725)

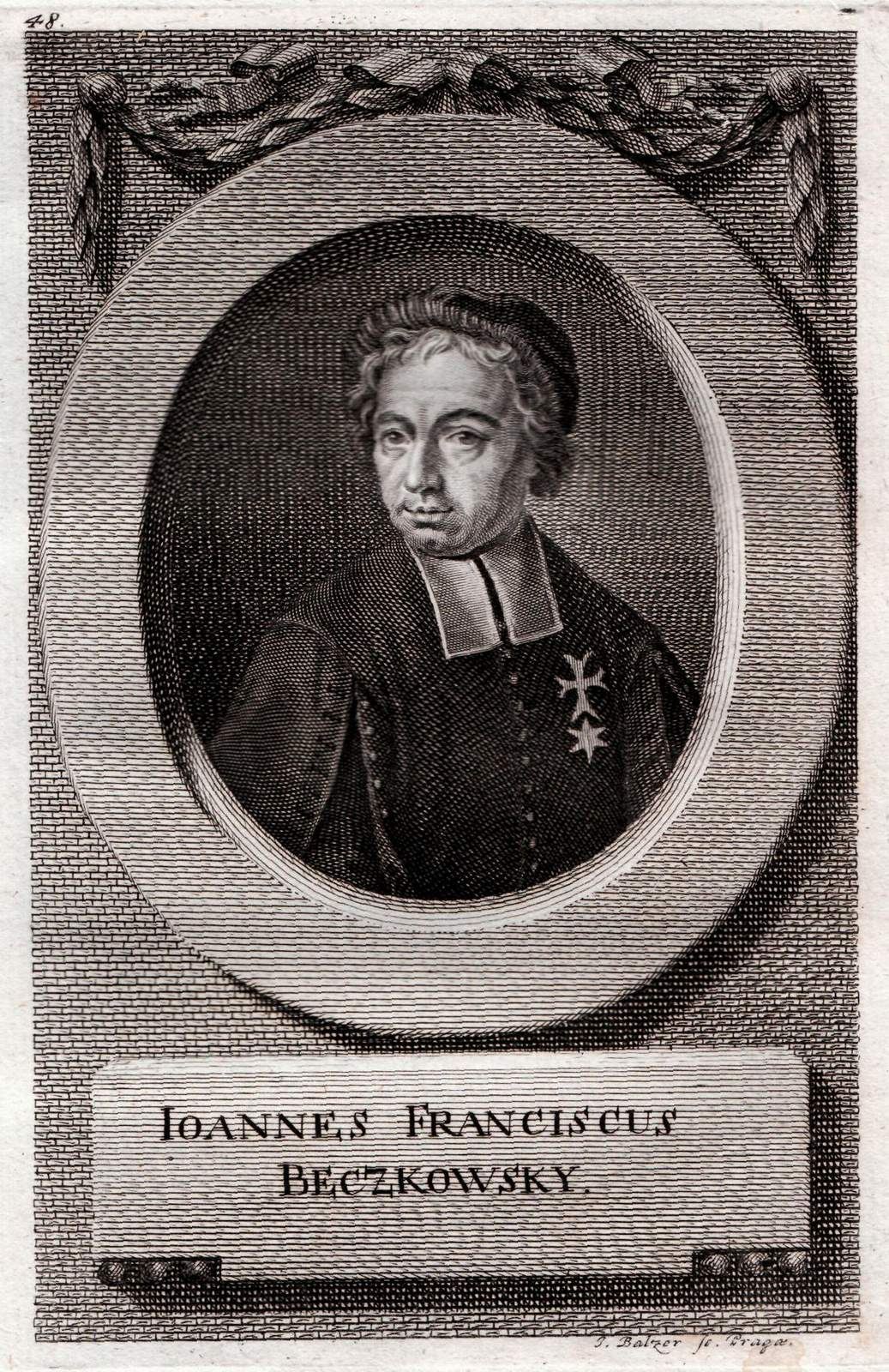
Jan František Beckovský

Jan František Beckovský (18 August 1658 – 26 December 1725), was a Czech historian, writer, translator, and priest.

== Life ==
Beckovsky was born and studied in Havlíčkův Brod, Brno, Vienna and Prague. In 1685 he entered the Knights of the Cross with the Red Star religious order, in 1688 he was ordained as a priest. Beckovský was in a friendly relationship with another Czech writer of that time, Bohuslav Balbín. From 1688 to his death in Prague, he worked as an administrator of the monastery in the New Town, Prague.

== Works ==
- Poselkyně starých příběhův českých... (1700–1723) - the chronicle in two parts, the first part contains events till 1526, in the second part Beckovský depicts with the strong patriotic accent events till the beginning of the 18th century. An important source of Czech patriotic education in the 18th century.
- Zarmoucená a po svém milenci truchlivá hrdička aneb kající křesťanská duše... (1703) - catechetic treatise

== See also ==
- List of Czech writers
