= Ivan Diviš =

Czech poet and essayist

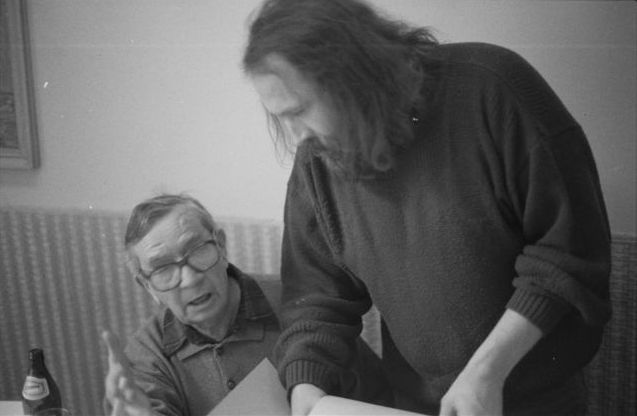
Ivan Diviš (left) with Ivan Wernisch, 1992 or 1993

Ivan Diviš (18 September 1924, in Prague – 7 April 1999, in Prague) was a significant Czech poet and essayist of the second half of the 20th century.

== Biography ==
He was born in Prague into the family of a bank officer. While at high school in Prague during World War II he was arrested by the Gestapo and imprisoned in Pečkárna and Pankrác. From 1942, he worked in a bookstore, and at the end of the war he was employed at publisher V. Petr. After passing his maturita he studied philosophy and aesthetics at Charles University (1945–1949). In the early 1950s, he worked as a corrector at the Communist Rudé právo newspaper. After 1953, he worked a lathe in Liberec and Prague-Kbely. In the 1960s, he was an editor at Mladá fronta publishing house. In 1964, he converted to Roman Catholicism. In the aftermath of the Prague Spring, he emigrated to West Germany in 1969 and worked as a librarian for Radio Free Europe. He lived in Munich until the Velvet Revolution of 1989 when he returned to Prague.

== Works ==
- Balada z regálu (1946, with Kamil Bednář, illustrated by Václav Bláha)
- První hudba bratřím (1947)
- Uzlové písmo (1960)
- Rozpleť si vlasy (1961)
- Deník molekuly (1962)
- Eliášův oheň (1962)
- Morality (1963)
- Chrlení krve (1964)
- Umbriana (1965)
- V jazyku Dolor (1966)
- Povíme si to! (1967)
- Sursum (1967, 2nd edition 1987 in Munich)
- Thanathea (1968)
- Noé vypouští krkavce (1975 in Toronto, revised 1995)
- Přece jen (1977 in Munich)
- Křížatky (1978 in Munich)
- Průvan (1978 Pondicherry)
- Beránek na sněhu (1980, 1994 in Munich)
- Odchod z Čech (1981, 1990 in Munich)
- Žalmy (186, 1991 revised in London)
- Obrať koně (1987, 1992 in Tessing)
- Moje oči musely vidět (1991)

== See also ==
- List of Czech writers
- List of Eastern Bloc defectors
