= Nižný Komárnik =

Village in Slovakia

- Municipality
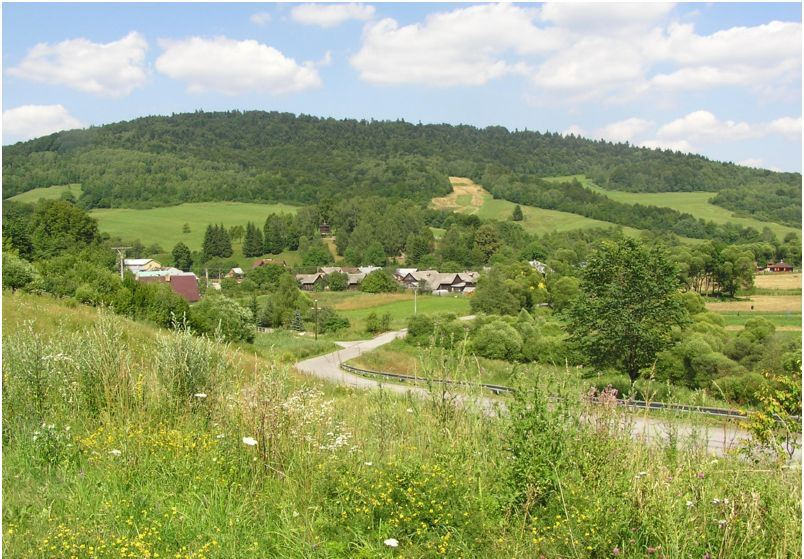

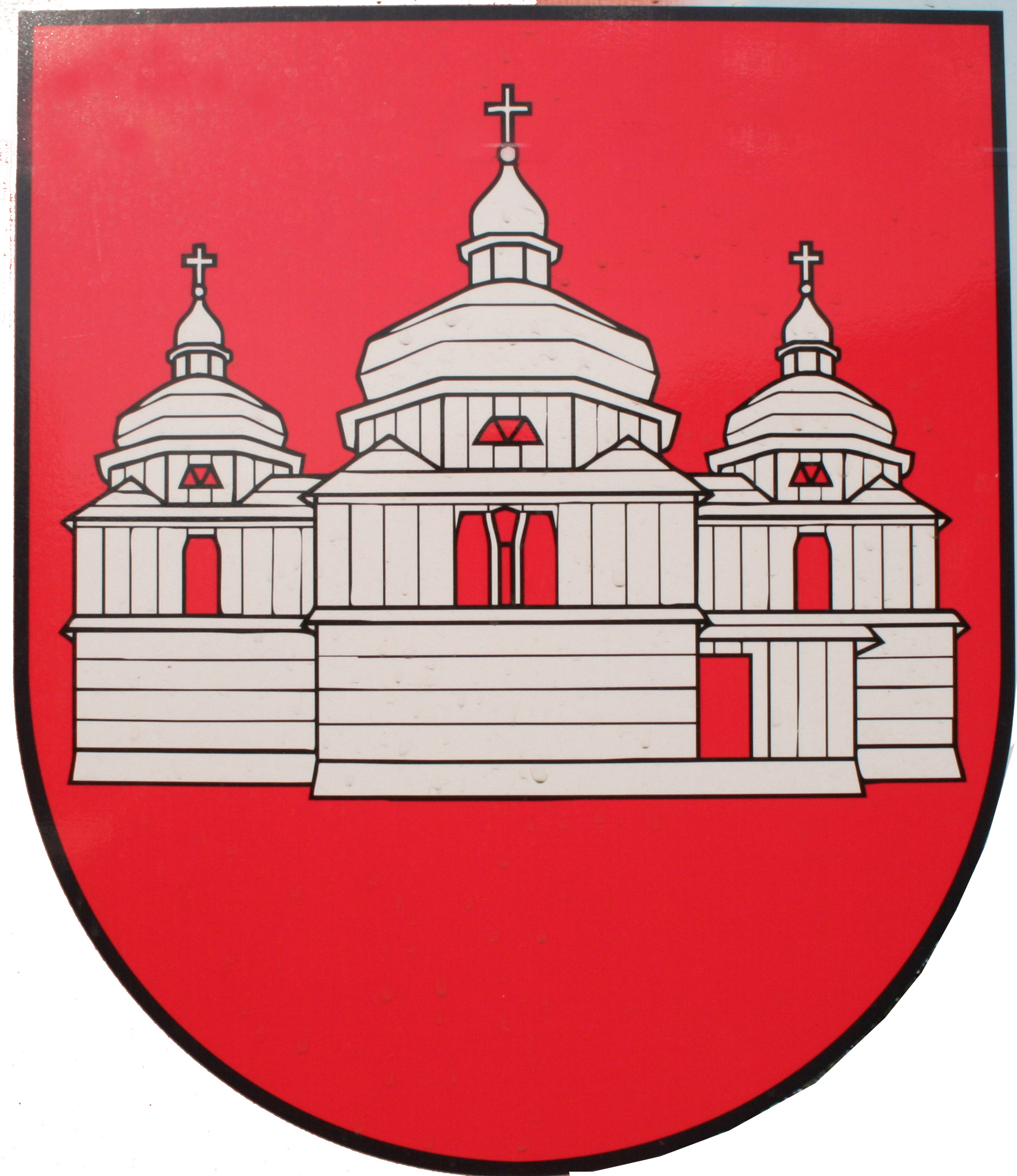
- Flag Coat of arms

- Location of Nižný Komárnik in the Prešov Region Location of Nižný Komárnik in Slovakia
- Coordinates: 49.38°N 21.70°E
- Country: Slovakia
- Region: Prešov Region
- District: Svidník District
- First mentioned: 1618

Area
  - Total: 12.38 km^{2} (4.78 sq mi)
- Elevation: 362 m (1,188 ft)

Population (2025)
  - Total: 183
- Time zone: UTC+1 (CET)
  - Summer (DST): UTC+2 (CEST)
- Postal code: 900 5
- Area code: +421 54
- Vehicle registration plate (until 2022): SK
- Website: www.obecniznykomarnik.sk

Nižný Komárnik (Hungarian: Alsókomárnok) is a village and municipality in Svidník District in the Prešov Region of north-eastern Slovakia.

== History ==
In historical records the village was first mentioned in 1618.

== Geography ==
The municipality lies at an altitude of 362 metres (1,188 ft) and covers an area of 12.38 km^{2} (4.78 sq mi) (2025).

== Population ==
Population statistic (10 years)
Year	1995	2005	2015	2025
Count	169	147	174	183
Difference		−13.01%	+18.36%	+5.17%

Population statistic
Year	2024	2025
Count	185	183
Difference		−1.08%

It has a population of 183 people (31 December 2025).

=== Ethnicity ===
Census 2021 (1+ %)
Ethnicity	Number	Fraction
Slovak	156	87.64%
Rusyn	42	23.59%
Romani	10	5.61%
Polish	5	2.8%
Not found out	3	1.68%
Total	178	

In year 2021 was 178 people by ethnicity 156 as Slovak, 42 as Rusyn, 10 as Romani, 5 as Polish and 3 as Not found out.

Note on population: The difference values of population numbers in the table "Population statistic" and in the sections "Ethnicity" & "Religion" is caused by the use of various statistical methods.

=== Religion ===
Census 2021 (1+ %)
Religion	Number	Fraction
Greek Catholic Church	158	88.76%
None	6	3.37%
Eastern Orthodox Church	5	2.81%
Not found out	4	2.25%
Roman Catholic Church	3	1.69%
Total	178	

In year 2021 was 178 people by religion 158 from Greek Catholic Church, 6 from None, 5 from Eastern Orthodox Church, 4 from Not found out, 3 from Roman Catholic Church, 1 from Other and 1 from Evangelical Church.
