= Anna Bolavá =

Czech writer and poet

Bohumila Adamová (born 22 August 1981 in Strakonice), known by her pen name Anna Bolavá, is a Czech writer and poet.

== Life ==
Anna Bolavá was born in Strakonice in 1981, but she spent her childhood and youth in Vodňany, which inspired her in her further work. She finished high school in Vodňany, then completed studies in Bohemistics at Charles University in Prague. After finishing her education, she briefly worked at the Institute of the Czech Language, then focused on working as an editor. She also contributed to such magazines as Tvar or Host.

== Career ==
Bohumila Adamová publishes books under the pen name Anna Bolavá and debuted in 2013 with a poetry book called Černý rok. Her first novel, Do tmy (2015), centers around a lonely herbalist, whose life – used to the rhythms of collecting and selling herbs – is disrupted by a progressing illness. The book was awarded with a Magnesia Litera for prose and shortlisted for the Josef Škvorecký Award. In 2018, Polish translation of the novel written by Agata Wróbel was nominated for a Gdynia Literary Prize. An excerpt of the original novel was chosen as the translation material for the third edition of the Susanna Roth Award – an international translation competition.

== Published works ==
- 2013: Černý rok (poetry)
- 2015: Do tmy
- 2017: Ke dnu
- 2020: Před povodní
- 2022: Vypravěč
