= Tomáš Krystlík =

Tomáš Krystlík (1947–2022) was a Czech publicist born in Prague. His publications include many articles and essays pertaining the history of Czechoslovakia, post-WWII expulsion of German nationals from border areas called Sudetenland. He also gives interviews on the current political situation in Czechia and Germany.

T.Krystlík has earned PhD. from Charles University in Prague. After his emigration to West Germany, he was employed by Radio Free Europe until the station was moved from Munich to Prague. He also contributed to number of exile publications such as "Britske Listy". He contributes regularly to internet publication "Parlamentni Listy" in his native language. Krystlík has written some obscure books, being a big fan of Henlein.

His articles and books are subject of criticism questioning their impartiality, historical accuracy and outright lies. T.Krystlík has been repeatedly criticized for his anti-Czech biased comments and vulgarity. T.Krystlik's blog was deleted by the system administrator for failure to remove prohibited content, such as banned content, i.e. erotic, offensive or immoral.
