= Peter Šedivý =

Slovak footballer

Personal information
- Full name: Peter Šedivý
- Date of birth: 5 January 1983 (age 43)
- Place of birth: Czechoslovakia
- Height: 1.87 m (6 ft 1 1/2 in)
- Position: Right back

Team information
- Current team: SV Horn
- Number: 3

Youth career
- 1989–1997: PSČ Pezinok
- 1997: SŠG Bernolákovo
- 1998–: Inter Bratislava

Senior career*
Years	Team	Apps	(Gls)
–2006	Inter Bratislava	74	(1)
2007	Sigma Olomouc	6	(1)
2007–2008	→Vysočina Jihlava "loan"	14	(0)
2009	→Inter Bratislava "loan"		
2009–2010	MFK Petržalka	21	(2)
2010–2011	Dunajská Streda		
2011–	SV Horn	33	(3)

International career
- Slovakia U-15
- Slovakia U-17
2002	Slovakia U-19		
2003	Slovakia U-20		
- Slovakia U-21
- * Club domestic league appearances and goals as of 21 August 2012

Peter Šedivý (born 5 January 1983) is a Slovak football defender who currently plays for SV Horn.

== Honours ==
=== Slovakia ===
Slovakia U19

- 2002 UEFA European Under-19 Football Championship - Third place
