= Ota Ulč =

Czech author and columnist (1930–2022)

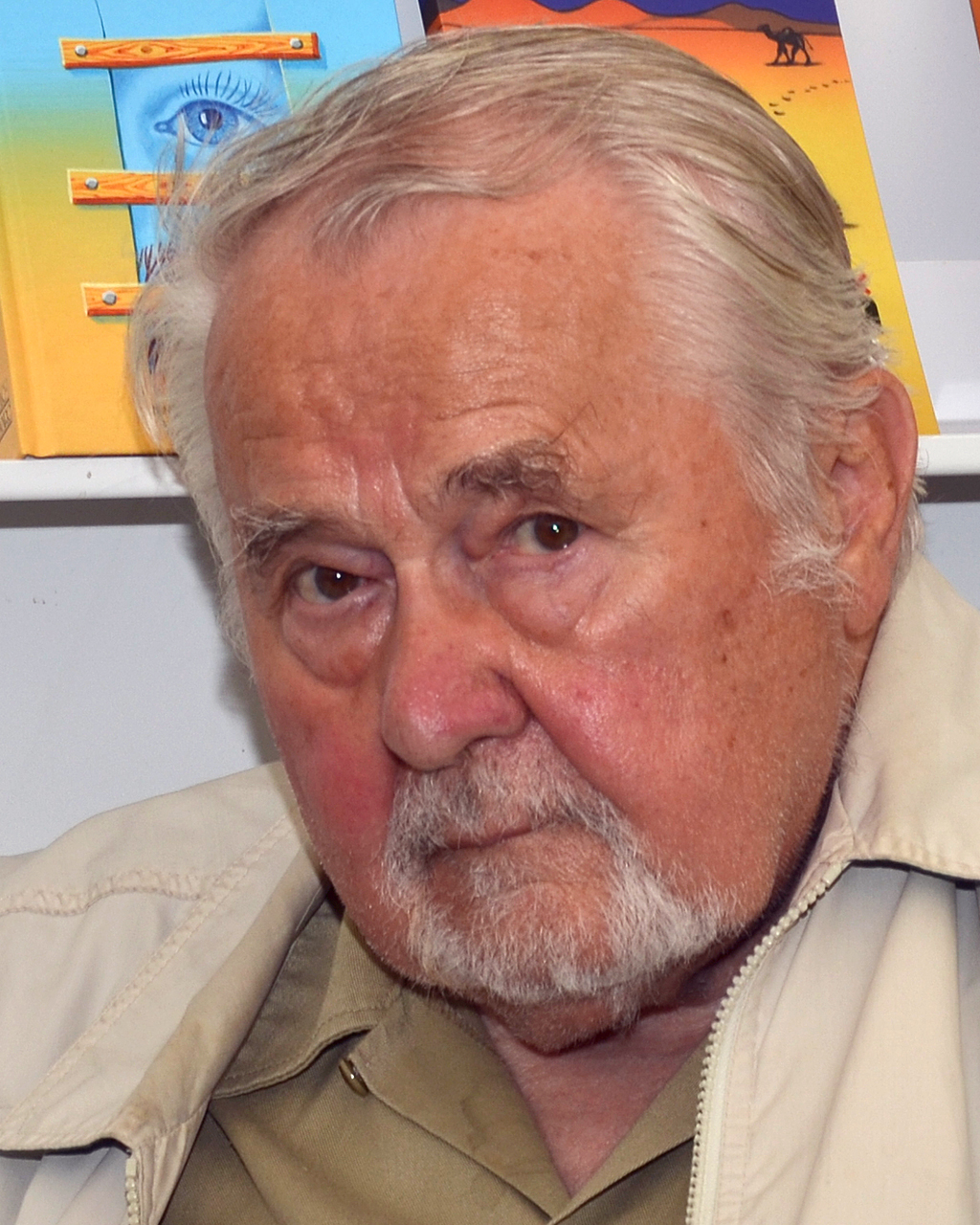
Ulč in 2017

Ota Ulč (16 March 1930 – 22 November 2022) was a Czech-American author and columnist.

Ulč studied law at the Charles University in Prague, then became a district court judge in Stříbro. In 1959 he escaped via West Berlin to the West and finally to the U.S. There he proceeded to study political science at the Columbia University in New York. Afterwards, he gave classes on comparative governments at Binghamton University.

His books were published by Škvorecký's 68 Publishers in Toronto. From 1989 to his death, Ulč published about 20 books and articles in both printed and online newspapers in the Czech Republic.

As of 2006, Ulč was living in Binghamton, in upstate New York. He died on 22 November 2022, at the age of 92.

== Publications ==
- Judge in a Communist State, Ohio University Press, 1972
- Politics in Czechoslovakia, San Francisco:W.H.Freeman, 1974
- Malá doznání okresního soudce, Sixty-Eight Publishers, Toronto, 1974
- Náš člověk v Indii a na Ceyloně, Sixty-Eight Publishers, Toronto, 1976
- Antinostalgicum, Sixty-Eight Publishers, Toronto, 1977
- Bez Čedoku po Pacifiku, Sixty-Eight Publishers, Toronto, 1980
- Špatně časovaný běženec, Sixty-Eight Publishers, Toronto, 1985
- Bez Čedoku po Jižní Africe, Sixty-Eight Publishers, Toronto, 1988
- Šťastně navrácený běženec, Sixty-Eight Publishers, Toronto, 1992
- My a oni, Polygon Verlag, Zurich, (1.ed.1987, 2.ed.1989)
- Malá doznání okresního soudce, Art-servis, Prague, 1990
- Nástin přednášek mezinárodního práva, Univerzita Palackého, Olomouc, 1991
- Příručka pro zájemce o americký svět, Rozmluvy, Prague, 1992
- Bez Čedoku po Číně a okolí, Ivo Železný, Prague, 1992
- Bez Čedoku po Jižní Africe, Ivo Železný, Prague, 1992
- Naši mezi protinožci, Faun, Prague, 1998
- Běženec v sametu, Faun, Prague, 1998
- Vandrování po Pacifiku a Oceánii, Olympia, Prague, 1998
- Všehochuť málo korektní Doplněk, Brno 2002
- Kam šlápne česká noha, Šulc, Prague, 2003,ISBN 80-7244-105-1
- Pacifik: ostrovní komunikace a lidožroutská tradice, Šulc, Prague, 2004
- Čech částečným Číňanem, Academia, Prague, 2004
- Klokánie a obtížné sousedství: piráti, lovci lebek, novodobí teroristé, Šulc, Prague, 2006
