= Pavel Kohout =

Czech poet, novelist, and playwright

- Pavel Kohout in 2026
- Born: 20 July 1928 (age 98); Prague, Czechoslovakia
- Occupation: Writer
- Writing career
- Notable awards: Austrian State Prize for European Literature

Pavel Kohout (born 20 July 1928) is a Czech and Austrian novelist, playwright, and poet. He was a member of the Communist Party of Czechoslovakia, a Prague Spring participant and dissident in the 1970s until he was not allowed to return from Austria. He was a founding member of the Charter 77 movement.

== Biography ==
He was still a devoted communist upon graduating from secondary school in 1947, and graduated from Charles University in 1952, with a degree in theater and aesthetics. He then became a member of the Central Committee of the Czechoslovak Youth Union, serving until 1960. It was during this period that he began writing plays and poetry. He was also a member of the Union of Writers.

In 1956, he was briefly employed by Czechoslovak Television as a reporter and commentator. From 1963 to 1966, he was the dramaturge at Vinohrady Theatre. While there, he became attracted to the reform movement and resigned from the Union of Writers due to questions concerning his "cultural-political orientation". In 1967, following a public reading of Solzhenitsyn's protest letter to the Union of Soviet Writers, he and several other prominent writers were subjected to disciplinary action.

Because he and other dissident theater workers had been banned from working in the official theater, he formed an acting company called "Living-Room Theater" with the actors Pavel Landovský, Vlasta Chramostová, Vlastimil Třešňák, and his daughter, Tereza Boučková to covertly perform an adaptation of William Shakespeare's Macbeth in living rooms in Prague. Czech-born UK playwright Tom Stoppard's Dogg's Hamlet, Cahoot's Macbeth is inspired by these events.

In 1968, he became one of the most prominent figures in the Prague Spring. The following year, he was expelled from the Communist Party and his works were subjected to strict censorship. He and his third wife Jelena Mašínová were allowed to travel to Austria in 1978, where he had a contract with the Burgtheater. While there, their citizenship was revoked and they could not return. In 1980, they received Austrian citizenship and settled in Vienna. In Austria he continued his work and was awarded the Austrian Waldviertel Academy prize. After the fall of the Communist government, they often returned to Prague and now divide their time between there and Sázava.

== Works ==
His most notable play is the drama Poor Murderer, which opened on Broadway in the Ethel Barrymore Theatre in 1976. It is based on the short story "Thought" by Leonid Andreyev.

His novels include White Book (an absurdist picture of life under Communism), I Am Snowing (a post-Communism story about the opening of the Communist-era secret police informer files, the effect of that opening on the informers and their victims, and thus about the corrosive effect of the Communist regime), The Widow Killer (a detective story set in World War II Nazi-occupied Prague), and The Hangwoman (a black-humor story about executioners), Seven Days in a Week (1965) and Morgen tanzt die ganze Welt (1952).

- Smyčka, 2008 novel

== Decorations and awards ==
- 1969 Franz Theodor Csokor Award
- 1977 Austrian State Prize for European Literature
- 1997 Das Glas der Vernunft (The Glass of Reason) (Kassel Citizenship Award)
- 1999 Austrian Cross of Honour for Science and Art, 1st class
- 2002 Cross of Merit of the Federal Republic of Germany
- 2004 Honorary Medal of the Austrian capital Vienna in gold
