= Ludvík Němec =

Czech writer

- Born: 8 July 1957 (age 69); Kyjov
- Occupation: writer
- Writing career
- Language: Czech

Ludvík Němec (born 8 July 1957) is a Czech writer.

== Biography ==
Němec was born 8 July 1957 in Kyjov, where he lived until 1959. He then lived in Karviná from 1957 to 1969 before moving to Pohořelice. From 1972 to 1975, Němec studied at the gymnasium in Mikulov.

From 1973, he published in the normalisation press (Red Law, Tvorba, Rovnost, Nové slovo, Čs. voják, etc.). In 1978, he published his first book, The Loudest Heart in Town.

Němec began working with Czech Radio in 1981. From 1992 to 1995, then 1998 to 2013, Němec was the director of the Brno studio.

In 2014, Němec was nominated for the Magnesia Litera Award for his short story collection Love on a Stranger's Grave.

== Publications ==
- The Loudest Heart in Town, 1978
- The Blind Game, 1982 – novel
- Guide through the air and darkness, 1988
- Negative, 1989 – novel
- I Am the Darkness, 1996 - short story collection
- Love on a Stranger's Grave, 2013 – collection of longer stories
- Indulgences for the Next Night, 2015
- The Woman in Brackets, 2018
- Cejchy Cejlu, 2020 – short story in the book Bloody Bronx
