= Vodňany =

- Town
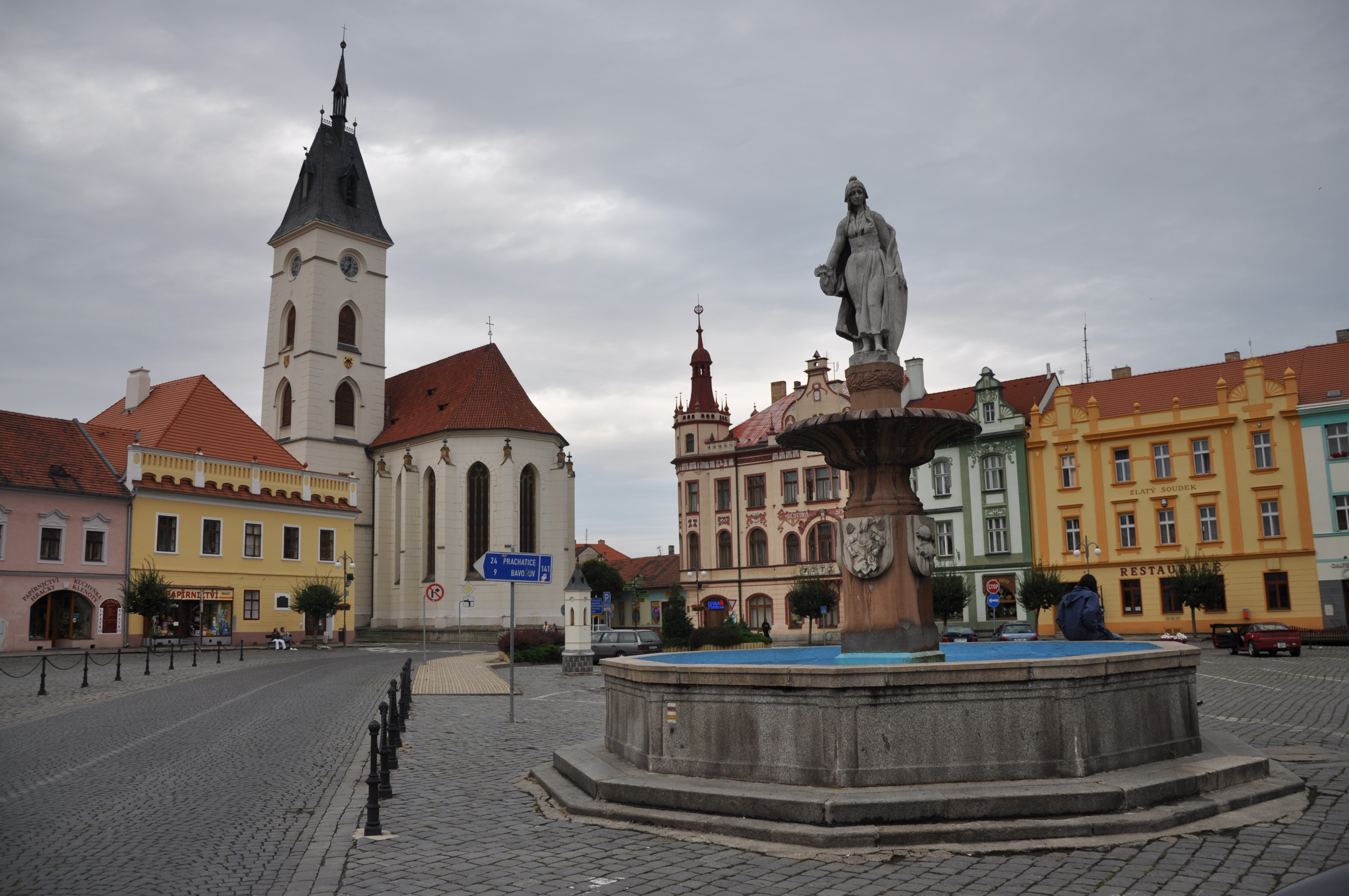
- Town square with the church and Baroque fountain

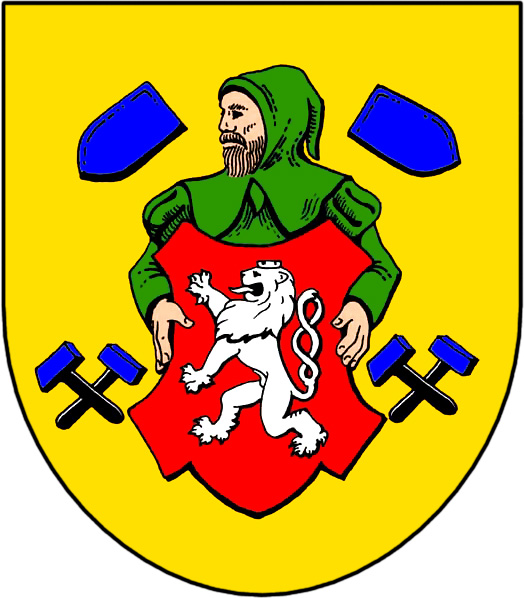
- Flag Coat of arms

- Location in the Czech Republic
- Coordinates: 49°8′52″N 14°10′32″E
- Country: Czech Republic
- Region: South Bohemian
- District: Strakonice
- First mentioned: 1327

Government
  - Mayor: Martin Macháč (ANO)

Area
  - Total: 36.34 km^{2} (14.03 sq mi)
- Elevation: 398 m (1,306 ft)

Population (2026-01-01)
  - Total: 7,464
  - Density: 205.4/km^{2} (532.0/sq mi)
- Time zone: UTC+1 (CET)
  - Summer (DST): UTC+2 (CEST)
- Postal code: 389 01
- Website: www.vodnany.eu

Vodňany (Czech pronunciation: [ˈvodɲanɪ]; German: Wodnian) is a town in Strakonice District in the South Bohemian Region of the Czech Republic. It has about 7,500 inhabitants. The town proper is located on the Blanice River in the České Budějovice Basin, in an area rich in fishpond. Vodňany has a tradition in pond farming and is also known for processing of poultry meat and duck meat.

Vodňany became a town in 1336. The historic town centre is well preserved and is protected as an urban monument zone. The main landmark of the town is the Church of the Nativity of the Virgin Mary. The village of Křtětice within Vodňany is protected as a village monument zone.

== Administrative division ==
Vodňany consists of nine municipal parts (in brackets population according to the 2021 census):

- Vodňany I (627)
- Vodňany II (5,155)
- Čavyně (41)
- Hvožďany (86)
- Křtětice (163)
- Pražák (300)
- Radčice (184)
- Újezd (232)
- Vodňanské Svobodné Hory (28)

== Etymology ==
The initial name of the settlement was Vodná (from voda, i.e. 'water'). However, the name changed to Vodňany (from vodňané = 'people living in Vodná') already in the first half of the 14th century.

== Geography ==
Vodňany is located about 23 kilometres (14 mi) southeast of Strakonice and 28 km (17 mi) northwest of České Budějovice. It lies mostly in the České Budějovice Basin. A small western part of the municipal territory extends into the Bohemian Forest Foothills and includes the highest point of Vodňany, the hill Svobodná hora at 640 m (2,100 ft) above sea level.

The town is situated on the right bank of the Blanice River. The territory of Vodňany is rich in fishponds.

== History ==
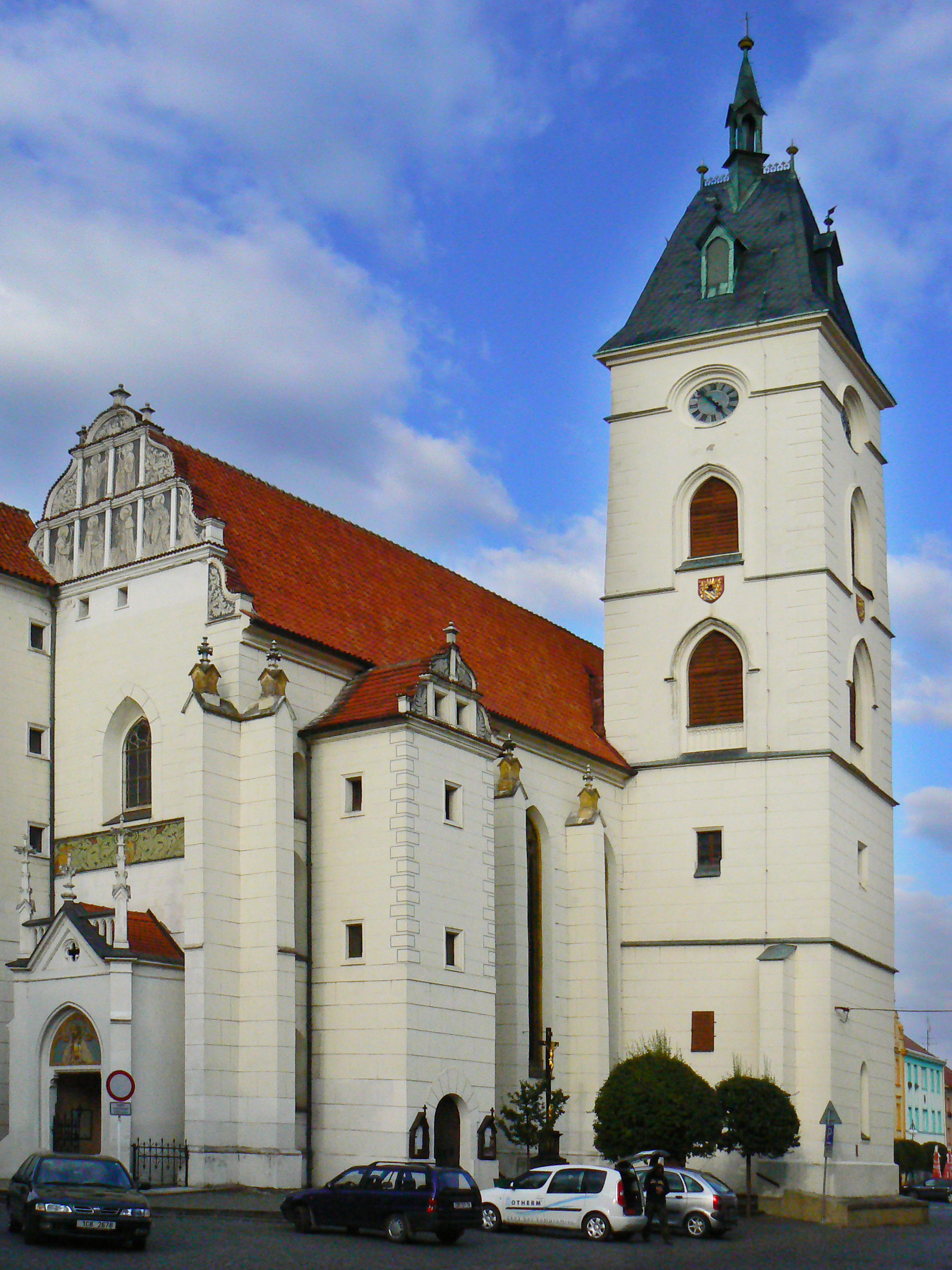
Church of the Nativity of the Virgin Mary

Vodňany was originally a Slavic settlement, gradually transformed into a market town. Its typical colonisation ground plan with a regular network of streets and a large regular square testifies to its origin to the reign of King Ottokar II in the second half of the 13th century. The first written mention of Vodňany is from 1327. In 1336, it was promoted to a town by King John of Bohemia. In 1400, Vodňany was referred to as a royal town.

For centuries, the town profited from the old trade route and the collection of customs duties. Originally, the mining of precious metals was also planned, but it was never fully developed, and the town's orientation towards pond farming became much more profitable. Since the second half of the 15th century, the town established fishponds, which are still a characteristic feature of the landscape.

== Demographics ==
Historical population

Year	Pop.	±%
1869	5,784	—
1880	5,605	−3.1%
1890	5,364	−4.3%
1900	5,556	+3.6%
1910	5,811	+4.6%

Year	Pop.	±%
1921	5,664	−2.5%
1930	5,813	+2.6%
1950	5,624	−3.3%
1961	6,287	+11.8%
1970	6,284	−0.0%

Year	Pop.	±%
1980	6,624	+5.4%
1991	6,331	−4.4%
2001	6,581	+3.9%
2011	7,147	+8.6%
2021	6,816	−4.6%

Source: Censuses

== Economy ==
The largest employer in the town and the region, and the largest processor of poultry meat and the only processor of duck meat in the Czech Republic, is Vodňanská drůbež company, part of the Agrofert holding.

The pond farming tradition continues to this day. A common carp bred in this town called "Omega3kapr" is healthier thanks to special feed and breeding conditions and is a registered trademark.

== Transport ==
The I/20 road (part of the European route E49) from České Budějovice to Plzeň and Karlovy Vary runs through the municipal territory. The I/22 road splits from it and connects Vodňany with Strakonice.

Vodňany is located on the railway line from Číčenice to Stožec-Nové Údolí.

== Education and science ==
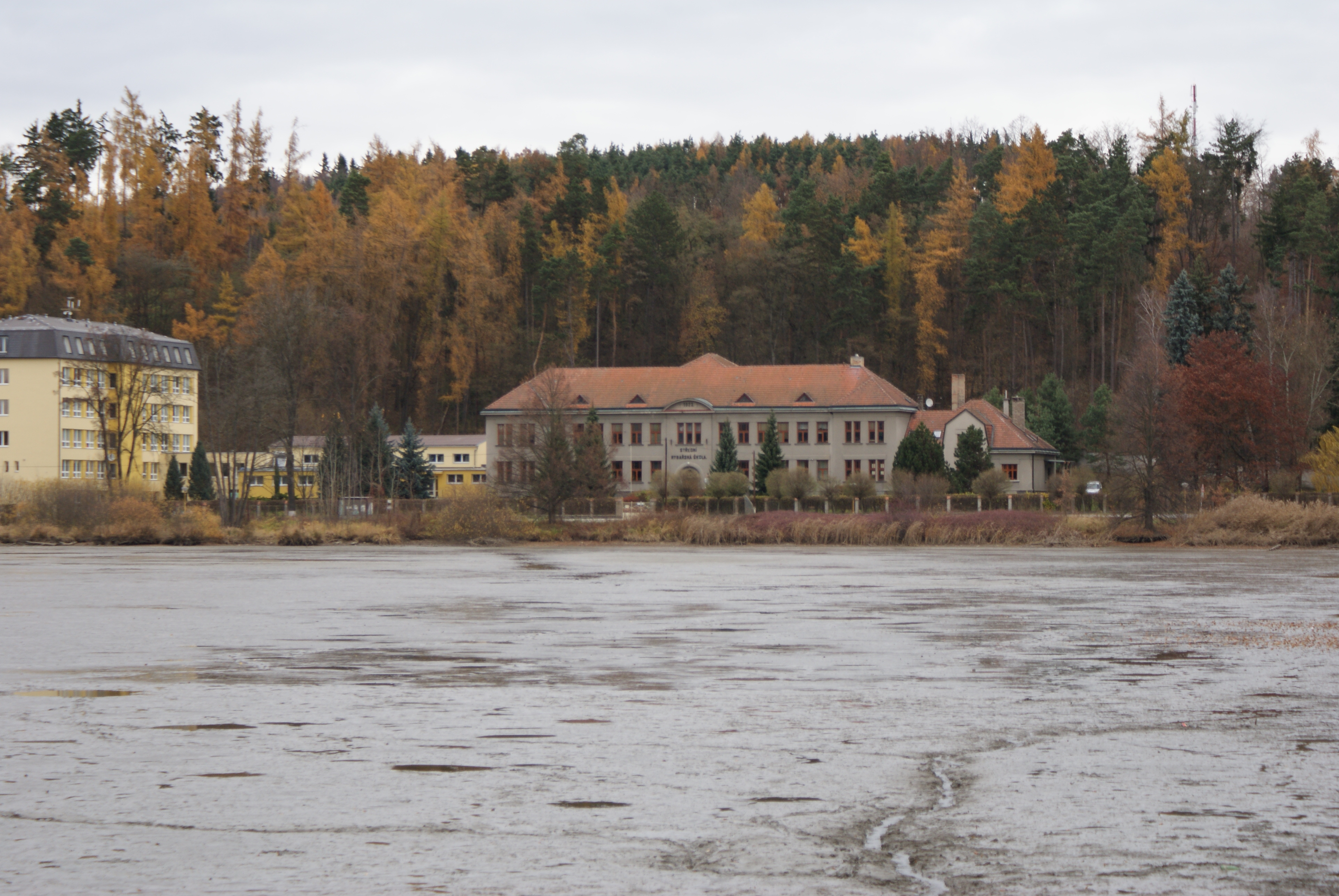
Secondary Fishing School and one of the fishponds

In 1920, the Secondary Fishing School was founded in Vodňany, and exists to this day. In 1996, a vocational school was founded by the secondary school, and since then the school's name is Secondary Fishing School and Higher Vocational School of Water Management and Ecology Vodňany.

In 1953, Research Institute of Fish Culture and Hydrobiology was founded in the town. In 2009, the institute became a part of Faculty of Fisheries and Protection of Waters of University of South Bohemia in České Budějovice.

== Sights ==
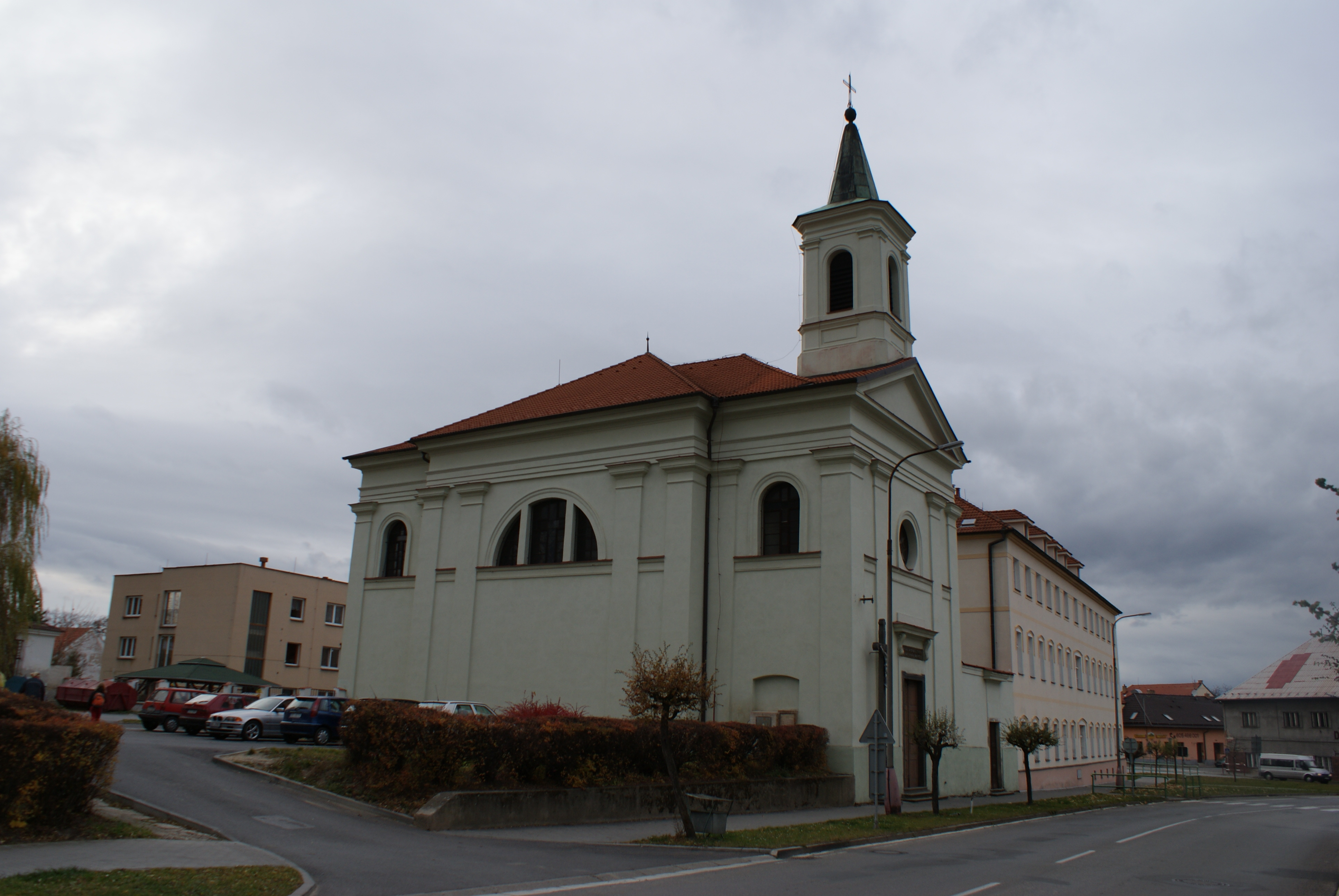
Church of Saint John the Baptist

The most valuable building of Vodňany and the main landmark of the town square is the Church of the Nativity of the Virgin Mary. Existence of the church was mentioned already in 1317. In 1894–1897, it was rebuilt into its current neo-Gothic form. The second church in the town is Church of Saint John the Baptist.

There are still remains of the town fortifications from the first half of the 15th century, represented by town walls with square bastions.

In the former synagogue there is a museum with exhibitions of the history of the town fishing in the town.

== Notable people ==
- Jan Campanus Vodňanský (1572–1622), writer
- Julius Zeyer (1841–1901), writer, poet, and playwright; lived here
- Marie Heritesová (1881–1970), violinist
- Jan Zrzavý (1890–1977), painter; lived here in 1942–1958
- Váša Příhoda (1900–1960), violinist
- Anna Bolavá (born 1981), writer

== Twin towns – sister cities ==
Vodňany is twinned with:

- Oravský Podzámok, Slovakia
- Sieraków, Poland
- Wartberg ob der Aist, Austria
- Zlaté Hory, Czech Republic
