= Jana Witthedová =

Czech writer living in Sweden (born 1948)

Jana Witthedová (born 28 June 1948) is a Czech writer living in Sweden.

== Biography ==
She was born in Zlín and grew up in Prague. In 1971, she was given political asylum in Sweden and earned a degree in psychology from Lund University. Unlike many Czech asylum seekers, Witthedová retained her Czech citizenship.

She contributes to both Czech and Swedish newspapers and journals, including Obrys, Literární noviny, Telegraf, Tvar, Severské listy, Český dialog and Artes. She has published several poetry collections and her writing has also been included in over 30 anthologies in Czech, Swedish and German. Her work has been translated into Swedish, Norwegian and English.

== Selected works ==
- Trosečníci křišťálové země (1997)
- Zastavení v hloubce času (2007)
- Kristallandets skeppsbrutna (2009)
- Litiluisté nosí železnou korunu a navštěvují krále (2011)
- Sagan om en stjärnas äventyr på himmelen och i viken (Alma Förlag 2016)
- Spolecně -Together (Czech Centre of International P.E.N. 2018)
