= Stožice, Czech Republic =

Stožice
- Municipality
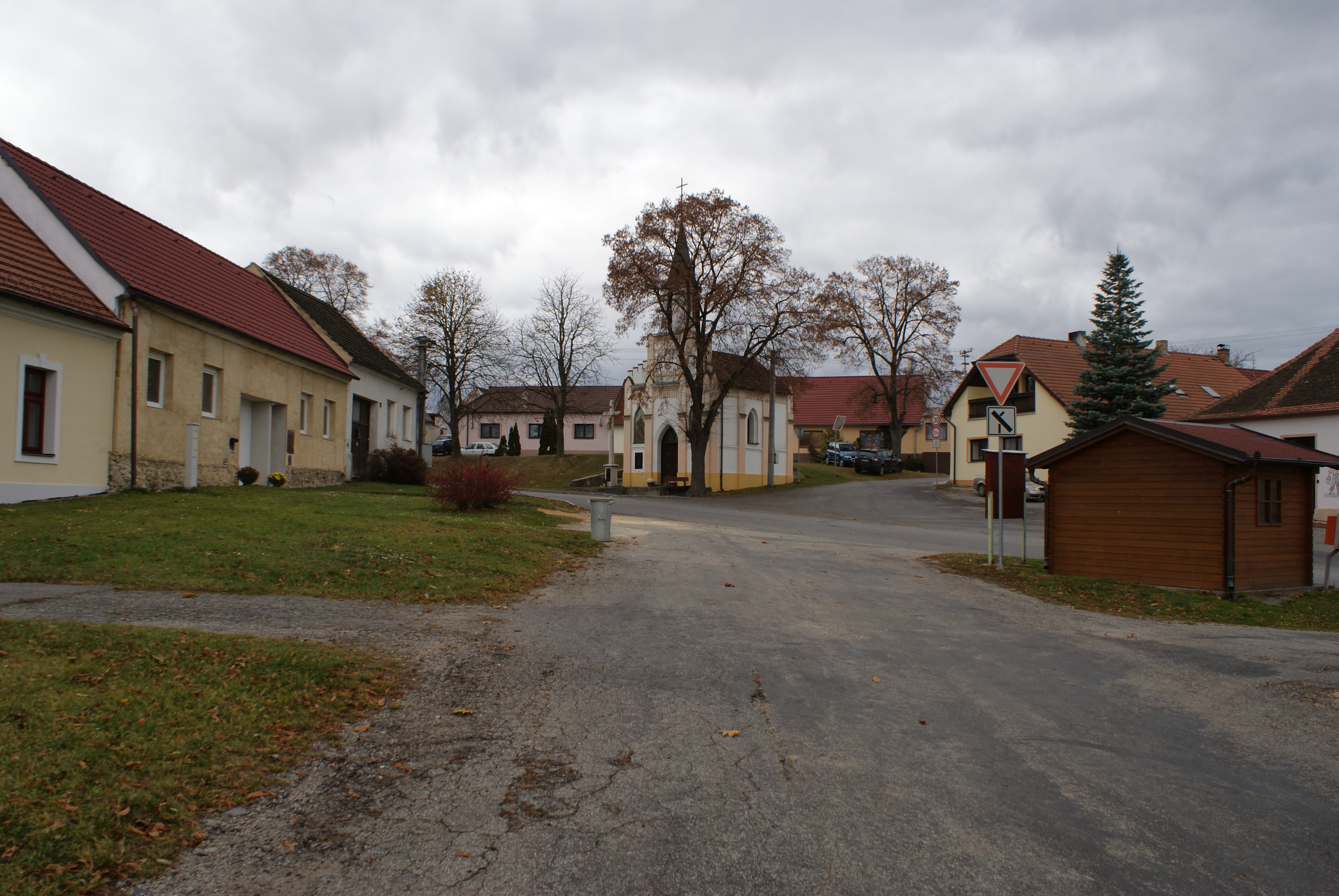
- Centre of Stožice

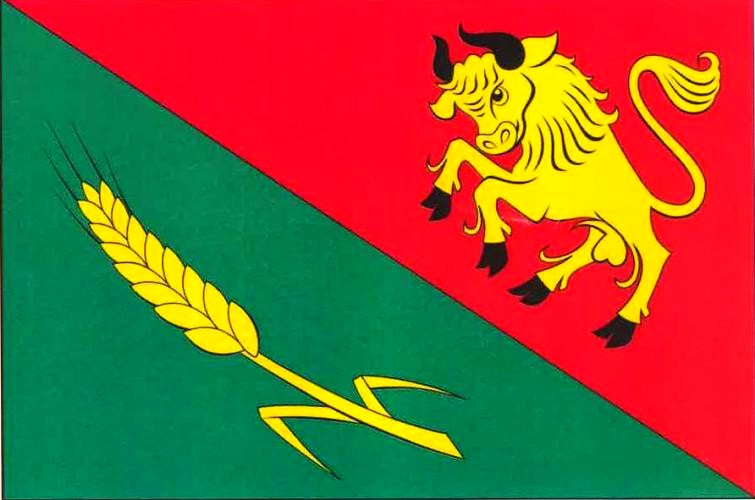
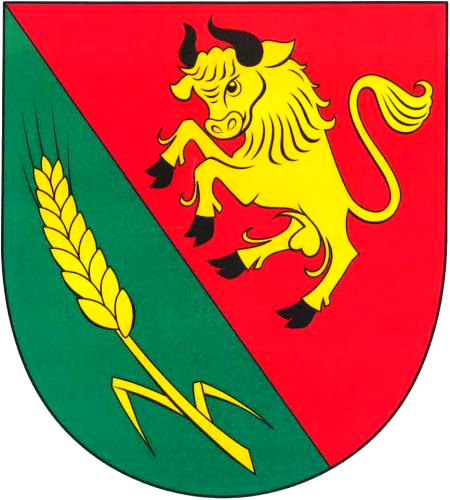
- Flag Coat of arms

- Location in the Czech Republic
- Coordinates: 49°7′57″N 14°9′0″E
- Country: Czech Republic
- Region: South Bohemian
- District: Strakonice
- First mentioned: 1416

Area
  - Total: 7.59 km^{2} (2.93 sq mi)
- Elevation: 441 m (1,447 ft)

Population (2026-01-01)
  - Total: 498
  - Density: 65.6/km^{2} (170/sq mi)
- Time zone: UTC+1 (CET)
  - Summer (DST): UTC+2 (CEST)
- Postal code: 389 01
- Website: www.stozice.cz

Stožice is a municipality and village in Strakonice District in the South Bohemian Region of the Czech Republic. It has about 500 inhabitants.

== Administrative division ==
Stožice consists of three municipal parts (in brackets population according to the 2021 census):

- Stožice (282)
- Křepice (55)
- Libějovické Svobodné Hory (46)

== Etymology ==
The name is derived from the personal name Stoh, meaning "the village of Stoh's people".

== Geography ==
Stožice is located about 22 kilometres (14 mi) southeast of Strakonice and 28 km (17 mi) northwest of České Budějovice. It lies on the border between the České Budějovice Basin and Bohemian Forest Foothills. The highest point is the hill Svobodná hora at 640 m (2,100 ft) above sea level.

== History ==
The first written mention of Stožice is from 1416. In 1927, gold was discovered near the village of Křepice, and the village thus became the last place in the country where the gold rush occurred.

== Demographics ==
Historical population

Year	Pop.	±%
1869	553	—
1880	572	+3.4%
1890	515	−10.0%
1900	533	+3.5%
1910	509	−4.5%

Year	Pop.	±%
1921	506	−0.6%
1930	445	−12.1%
1950	333	−25.2%
1961	315	−5.4%
1970	289	−8.3%

Year	Pop.	±%
1980	278	−3.8%
1991	250	−10.1%
2001	277	+10.8%
2011	307	+10.8%
2021	383	+24.8%

Source: Censuses

== Transport ==
There are no railways or major roads passing through the municipality.

== Sights ==
The most valuable monument is the Chapel of Saint John of Nepomuk in Křepice. It is a small chapel from the 19th century with a belfry on the top.

The main sights in Stožice are the neo-Gothic Chapel of Saints Simon and Jude and the birthplace of the writer Josef Holeček.

== Notable people ==
- Josef Holeček (1853–1929), writer
