= Prokop František Šedivý =

Prokop František Šedivý (4 July 1764 – c. 1810) was a Czech playwright, actor, and translator of the National Revival era. He is considered to be one of the founders of modern Czech theatre and he was involved in founding the first entirely Czech-language theatre Bouda.

== Biography ==
Generally, there is not much information about Šedivý's life. He was born in Prague, into a brewer's family, and probably worked as a state official later.

== Works ==
Šedivý's best-known plays are Kníže Honzík (Prince Honzík, the very first Czech play), Pražští sládci (The Prague Brewers), and České Amazonky (The Czech Amazons, 1792).

He translated Shakespeare's King Lear into Czech.

== See also ==
- List of Czech writers
