= Tereza Boučková =

Czech writer and scriptwriter

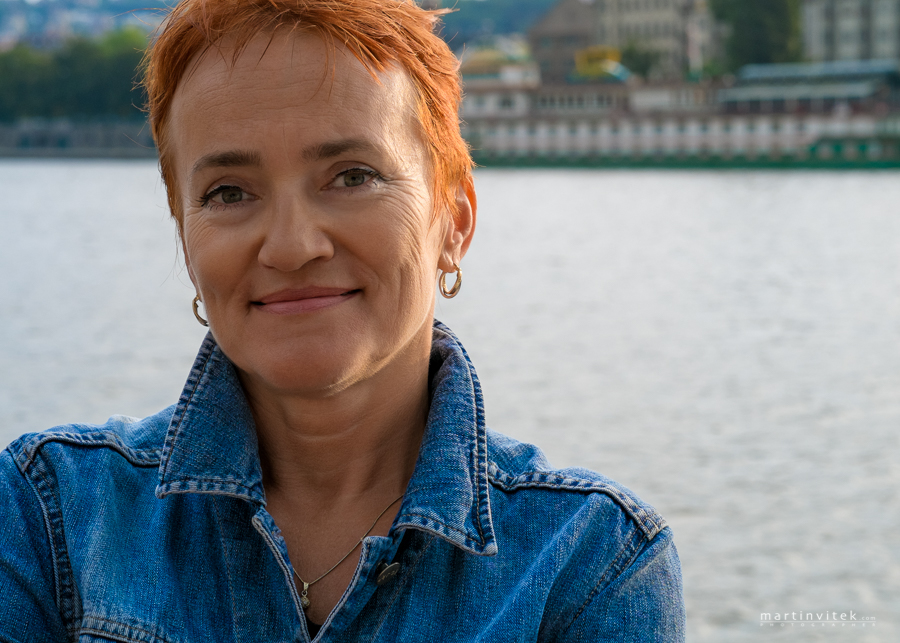
Tereza Boučková in September 2014

Tereza Boučková (born 24 May 1957) is a Czech writer.

The daughter of playwright Pavel Kohout and Anna Cornová, she was born in Prague, attended high school and studied English for a year after being rejected by the Drama Academy for political reasons. She signed Charter 77 and subsequently worked as a cleaner, postal worker and concierge. In 1985, she married Jiří Bouček.

She published her first prose work Indiánský běh (Indian Run) in samizdat. It received the Jiří Orten Award in 1990. In 2006, she won first prize for her script Zemský ráj to napohled; she wrote the screenplay for the 2009 film of the same name directed by Irena Pavláskové with English title An Earthly Paradise for the Eyes.

== Selected works ==
- Křepelice (Quail), short fiction (1993)
- Když milujete muže (When You Love a Man), novella (1995)
- Krákorám (I’m Cawing), short stories (1998)
