= Křepice (Znojmo District) =

- Municipality
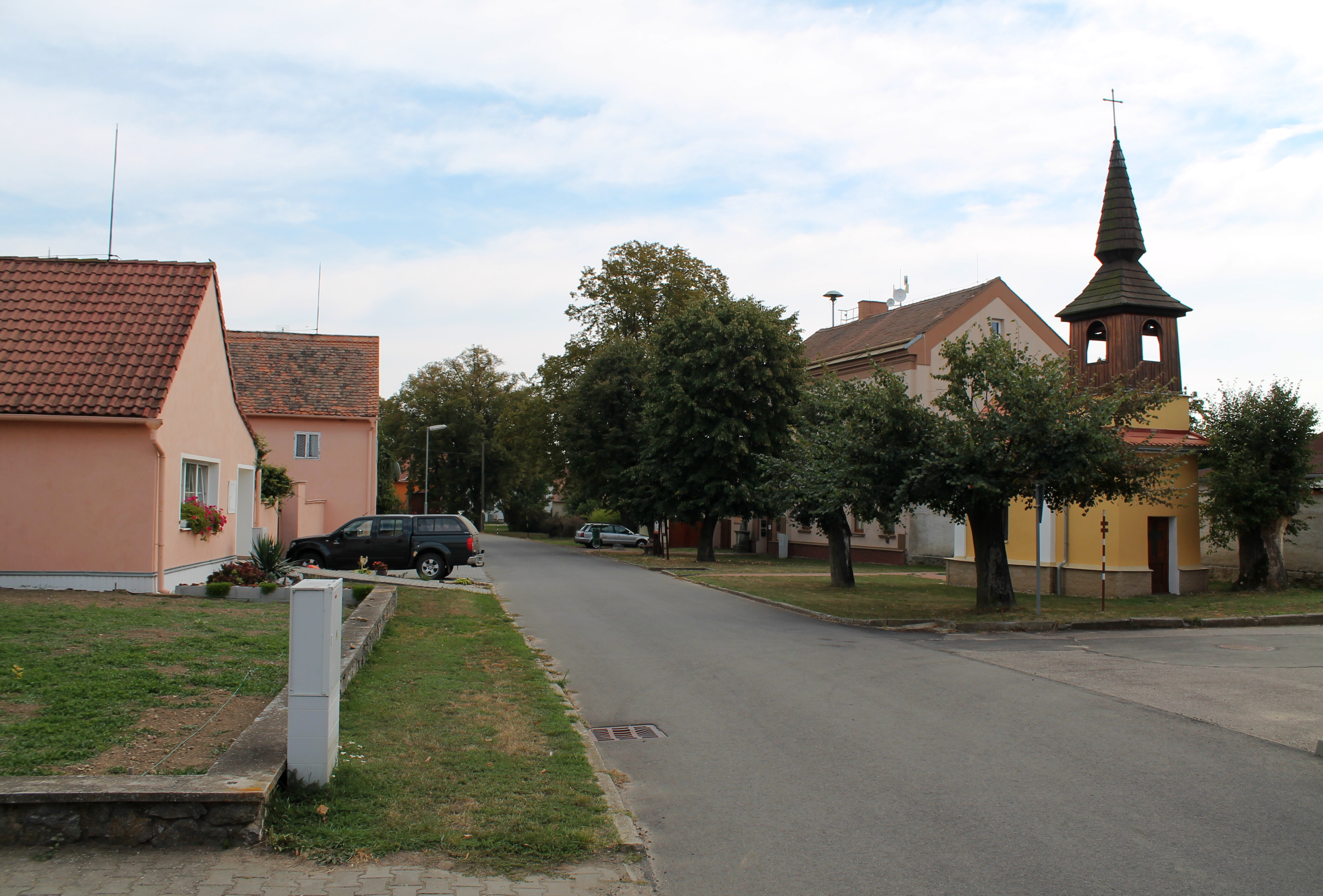
- Centre of Křepice

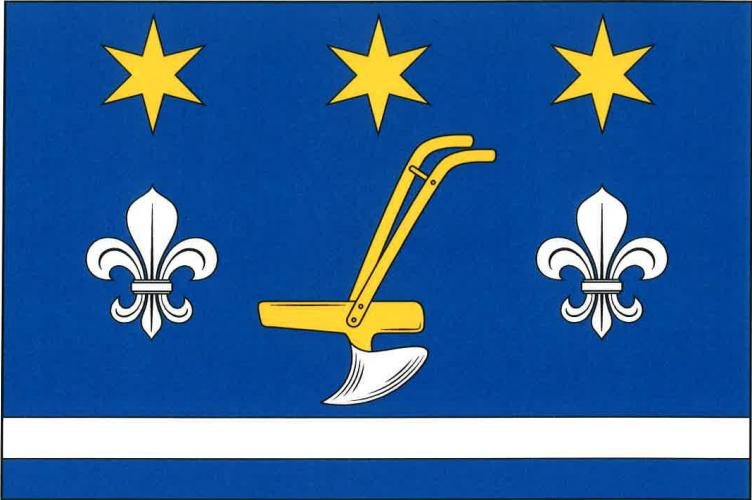
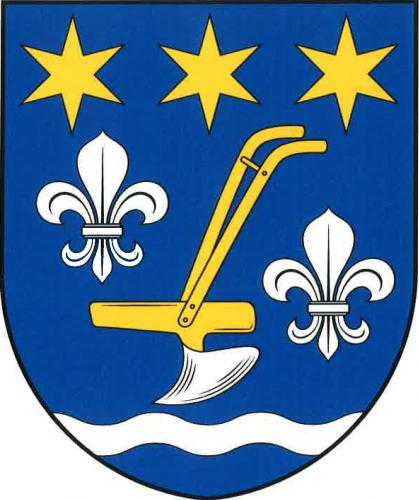
- Flag Coat of arms

- Location in the Czech Republic
- Coordinates: 48°59′15″N 16°5′51″E
- Country: Czech Republic
- Region: South Moravian
- District: Znojmo
- First mentioned: 1196

Area
  - Total: 7.24 km^{2} (2.80 sq mi)
- Elevation: 336 m (1,102 ft)

Population (2026-01-01)
  - Total: 113
  - Density: 15.6/km^{2} (40.4/sq mi)
- Time zone: UTC+1 (CET)
  - Summer (DST): UTC+2 (CEST)
- Postal code: 671 40
- Website: www.obec-krepice.cz

Křepice is a municipality and village in Znojmo District in the South Moravian Region of the Czech Republic. It has about 100 inhabitants.

Křepice lies approximately 16 kilometres (10 mi) north of Znojmo, 46 km (29 mi) south-west of Brno, and 173 km (107 mi) south-east of Prague.

== Demographics ==
Historical population
Year	Pop.	±%
1869	235	—
1880	228	−3.0%
1890	302	+32.5%
1900	248	−17.9%
1910	263	+6.0%
1921	280	+6.5%
1930	262	−6.4%
1950	238	−9.2%
1961	237	−0.4%
1970	198	−16.5%
1980	162	−18.2%
1991	143	−11.7%
2001	138	−3.5%
2011	119	−13.8%
2021	104	−12.6%
Source: Censuses
