= Emilie Fryšová =

Czech educator, writer, ethnologist (1840–1920)

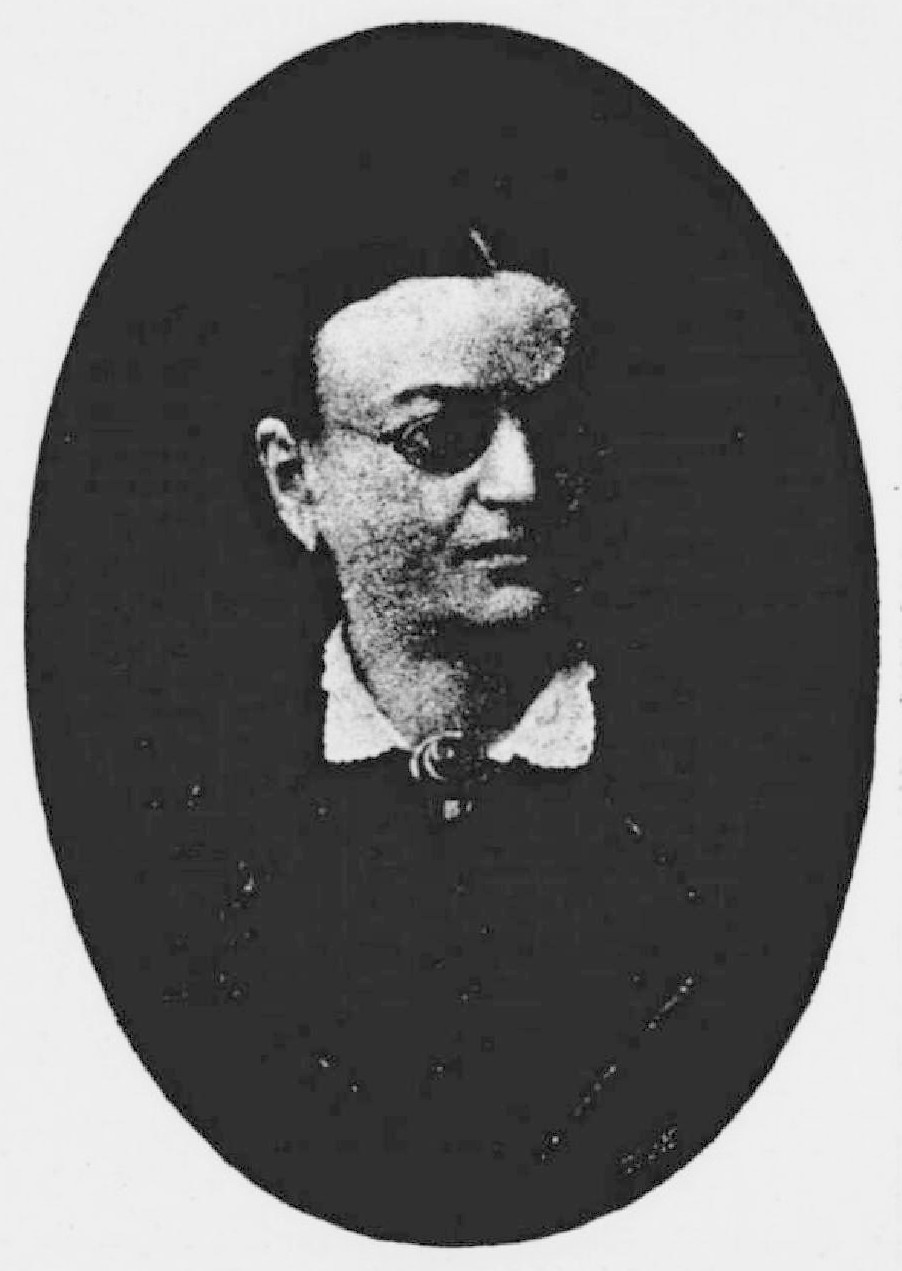
- Fryšová in 1908
- Born: Emilie Frischová; 23 July 1840; Prague, Austrian Empire
- Died: 17 January 1920 (aged 79); Písek, Czechoslovakia
- Burial place: Písek
- Occupations: Teacher, writer, ethnographer

Emilie Fryšová, born Emilie Frischová (23 July 1840 – 17 January 1920) was a Czech teacher, ethnographer and writer. As an avid collector, she assembled much of the region's rich ethnographic and historical collections, especially in the so-called Soběslavská Blata architectural area in the South Bohemian Region. Her work is now part of the National Museum collection in Prague.

== Biography ==
Fryšová was born on 23 July 1840 in Prague. She graduated from a two-year German teachers' institute in Prague, followed by a drawing and language teaching course in Karlovy Vary, where she also taught privately. Then she taught in Nussdorf near Vienna, Austria. Only after this mandatory three-year practice was she allowed to pass the teacher's exam, which authorized her to teach in municipal schools. She then taught at a higher girls' school in Chrudim, from 1873 at a school in Plzeň, and in 1886 she moved to Soběslav. Her surname was changed to Fryšová only after 1880, when the government, under Stremayr's language regulations, established a new equality of the Czech language with the German language in official communication, thus revitalizing the native language of the Czech Republic.

Fryšová was the director of the general school and burgher school in Soběslav, becoming one of the first female school directors in Bohemia. She published a three-volume history textbook for bourgeois schools. She wrote magazine articles about her teaching practice (especially in Ženské listy) or ethnographic articles based on her own ethnographic research and collecting activities. She was the founder and honorary member of the Regional Central Union of Teachers, a member of the Women's Production Association, to whose activities she contributed financially every year, just like her sisters Johanna and Kateřina. In Soběslav, she founded a women's association to support activities benefiting poor youth and a nursery school.

In addition to her teaching work, she devoted herself for a long time and diligently to field ethnographic research and collecting regional South Bohemian artifacts. She was the first to draw attention to the classic Blata krojs and Kozácko region krojs (Kozácko is an ethnographic region around the town of Tábor). She was a devoted and respected collaborator of the museum's founder, the pedagogue Karl Lustig. Her work is reflected in the extensive ethnographic collection in the museum, examples of the life of rural people, folk art and creations of the inhabitants of Soběslavská Blata and Kozácko. Fryšová collected and bought folk embroideries, costumes and patterns from Blata (she donated 1,500 pieces to the National Museum in Prague), and her collections of the peculiar beauty of Blata were admired in 1895 by visitors to the Czechoslovak Ethnographic Exhibition in Prague and in 1898 to the Ethnographic, School and Industrial and beekeeping exhibitions in Soběslav, held to support the opening of the local museum.

Fryšová's name is also associated with Písek, where she lived and wrote her three books after finishing her teaching career. There she collaborated closely with Anna Regina Husová who maintained her own collection of women's holiday or ceremonial clothing. During the first twenty years of the 20th century, Fryšová also worked in the town's museum, where she was the first to organize the collection of the ethnographic department and substantially expanded it with numerous embroideries. Because the collection came mainly from the region of the Soběslav mudflats, the museum handed them over to the Soběslav museum in the late 1950s in exchange for specimens of natural history. In the Písek museum, historian-professor August Sedláček (a native of Mladá Vožice) and archaeologist-teacher Bedřich Dubský (from Komárov) helped her as colleagues and advisors. Fryšová consulted her findings mainly with Čeněk Zíbrt, with whom she corresponded for a long time. On his advice, she donated the most valuable part of her collections to the National Museum.

Emilie Fryšová died suddenly at 79 in Písek on 17 January 1920 after a stroke. She was buried there and she wrote the inscription that appears on her tombstone: "A worker for the nation, a hereditary role".

== Selected works ==
- Fryšová, Emilie. "O rozhraní kroje blatského a kozáckého." Český lid (1900): 292-292.
- Fryšová, Emilie. "Ornament jihočeský." (1902).
- Fryšová, Emilie. Jihočeská blata. Nakl. vlástním, 1913.
