= Kamil Bednář =

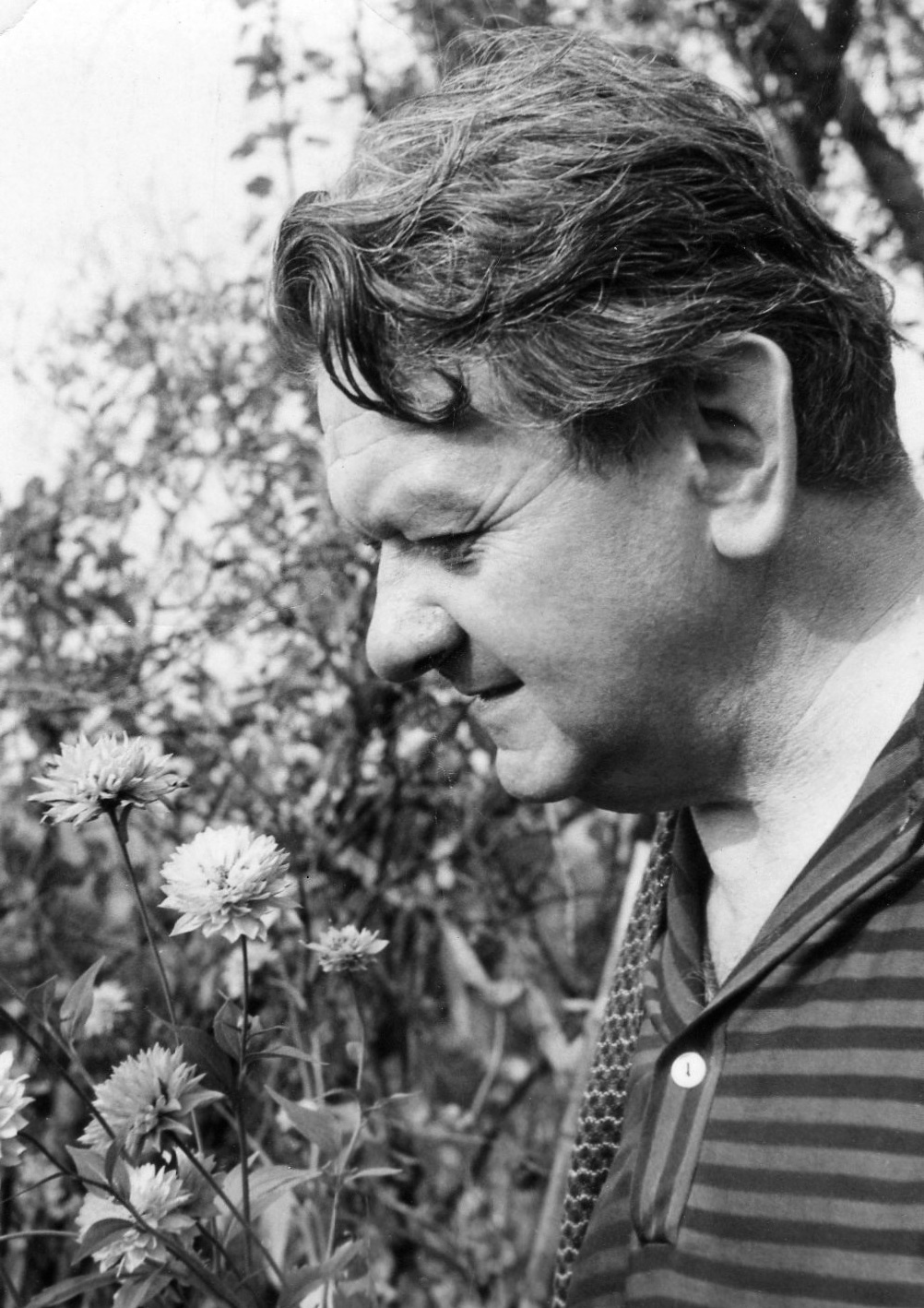
Kamil Bednář in 1970

Kamil Bednář, also known by his pen name Prokop Kouba (4 July 1912 – 23 May 1972), was a Czech poet, translator, prose writer, dramatist and publishing house editor.

== Life ==
Bednář was born in Prague. After 1931, he studied law, and then six years of philosophy in Charles University. After he finished his studies in 1939, he worked in the publishing house Melantrich, from 1949 in the publishing house Československý spisovatel. Since 1959 he dedicated himself only to the literature.

He was founder of the literary group Ohnice (jointed charlock) and Pevný bod as well as author of poems, prose writings, essays, fairy tales and numerous translations from different languages.

== Death ==
He died, aged 59, in Mělník.

== Works ==
=== Books ===
- Kouzlení a cesty doktora Fausta
- O Faustovi, Markétce a ďáblu
- Zuzanka a mořeplavci na Vltavě
- Kamenný palác
- Veliký mrtvý

=== Translations ===
- American poet Robinson Jeffers
- Puss n Boots / The Cat in Boots Kocour v botách

=== German-language publications ===
- Mr. Korbes
- Swan lake
- Small animals, large animals
