= Lev Blatný =

Czech poet, author, theatre critic, and dramaturg

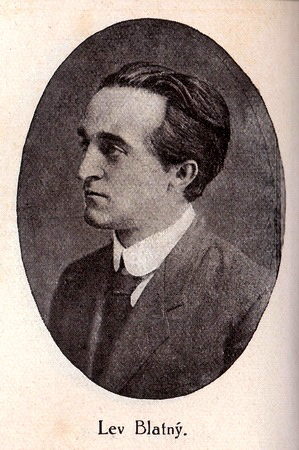
Blatný in 1923

Lev Blatný (11 April 1894 – 21 June 1930) was a Czech poet, author, theatre critic and dramaturg. He is the father of poet Ivan Blatný.

== Life ==
Blatný was born on 11 April 1894 in Brno. He descended from a musical family from Brno. From 1915 to 1918 he was a soldier in Galicia, in the Bukovina and Albania. After the war he terminated his studies in Prague and became a civil servant at Československé státní dráhy (Czechoslovak State Railways) in Brno. Shortly thereafter he began his theatre activity, first as Dramaturg. He tried to bring important new works native and strange artists on the stage.

== Works ==
Already as a young man he published poems and short prose, later the theatre was his homeland, he wrote also numerous criticisms. His first own work was Starlit Sky (Hvězdná obloha), specified in the theatre in Brno. The play Three (Tři) and the comedy followed Kokoko dák, were his most popular works. He wrote also some Expressionist stories. He died of tuberculosis on 21 June 1930 in Poprad-Kvetnica.
