= Josef Holeček (writer) =

Czech writer (1853–1929)

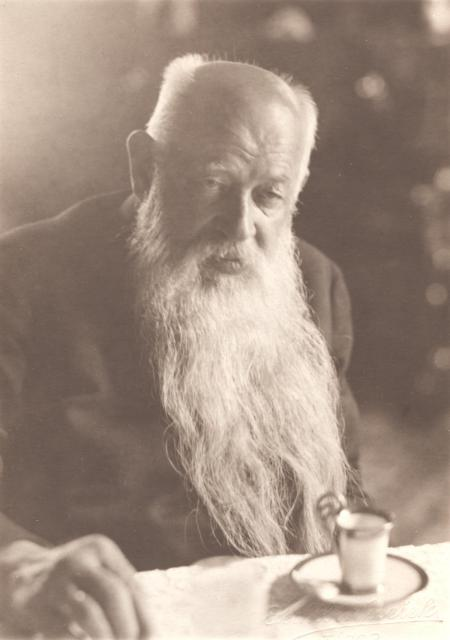
Josef Holeček in 1909 or 1910, photo by Ignác Šechtl

Josef Holeček (27 February 1853 – 6 March 1929) was a Czech writer of the realism and ruralism movements. He wrote about his native South Bohemian Region. He was journalist and translator as well.

== Biography ==
Holeček was born on 27 February 1853 in Stožice. He studied in Písek, České Budějovice and Tábor (the oldest park there is named after him Holečkovy sady) and since 1926 there is his monument there.

Having befriended several South Slavs in Tábor, he became interested in their folklore and also in literature, art and history in general. After his studies, he worked in Zagreb and in 1875 he became a correspondent of the Prague newspaper Národní listy in Montenegro. He was a Slavic patriot; in 1887 he visited Russia and in 1889 he travelled through Anatolia and visited Istanbul.

He died on 6 March 1929 in Prague, at the age of 76.

== Works ==
His work focuses on the life in the countryside and emphasizes the power of love which can salve the bad things.

=== Fiction and non-fiction ===
- Černá Hora (Montenegro)
- Černá Hora v míru (Montenegro during peace times)
- Nekrvavé obrázky z vojny (Bloodless pictures from the war) – feuilletons which portray the nonsensical Austrian militarism; their style anticipates Švejk.
- Za svobodu (For Freedom)
- Junácké kresby černohorské (Sketches of Montenegro heroism)
- Zájezd na Rus (Journey to Russia)
- Ruskočeské kapitoly (Russo-Czech Chapters)
- Podejme ruku Slovákům! (Let's offer hand to Slovaks!) – an attempt to solve problems between Czech and Slovak intellectuals which found many followers
- Naši (Our people) – a ten-part chronicle in twelve books (1897–1930) which describes the life in the village of Stožice in the 19th century; unfinished.
- Jak u nás lidé žijou a umírají (How our people live and die) – a peasant portrayed as a symbol of the national virtues; unlike in other writers' works, not only because he speaks Czech, but also because Holeček well understood the importance of the village life.
- Frantík a Bartoň
- Tragédie Julia Grégra (Tragedy of Julius Grégr)
- Pero (Pen) – memoirs

=== Translations ===
- Písně hercegovské (Songs of Herzegovina)
- Srbská národní epika (Serbian National Epic Poetry)
- Kalevala – his translation (which keeps the original rhythm) is still the only Czech one. It was the first full translation of this epic poem into a Slavic language. Holeček was inspired to translate the work as he was generally interested in the art of the "small nations" (Josef Holeček, 1915). With the help of Leopold Geitler and Bohuslav Čermák (amanuensis in the Prague library) he learned Finnish from Finnish-German vocabularies found in Leipzig secondhand bookstores and from the 1818 German grammar book Finnische Sprachlehre für Finnen und Nicht-Finnen... by Johan Stråhlman which they found in Prague, as there was no bookshop connection between Prague and Scandinavia then. The translation was published at Holeček's own expense (and a grant of 500 florins from the Royal Czech Society of Sciences) between 1894 and 1895.
