= Bohuslav Balbín =

Czech writer, historian and Jesuit (1621–1688)

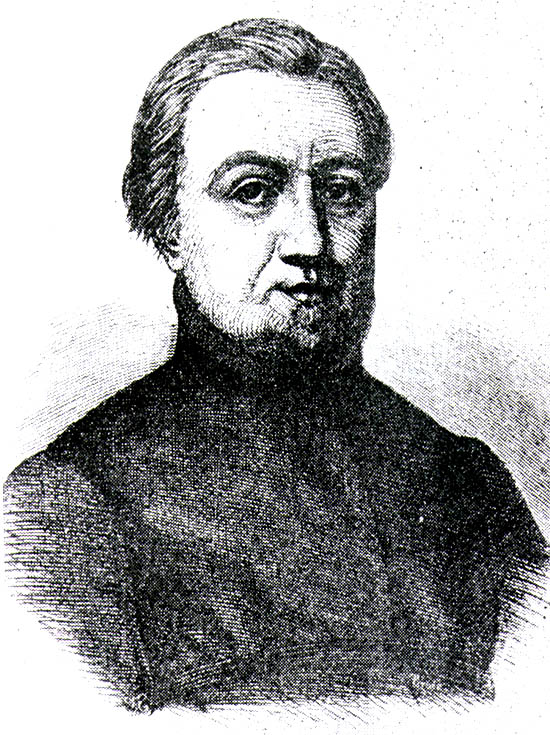
Bohuslav Balbín

Bohuslav Balbín (3 December 1621 – 29 November 1688) was a Czech writer, historian, geographer and Jesuit. He became well known also as an advocate of the Czech language in the time of incoming germanisation of the Czech lands. He was called the "Czech Pliny".

== Life ==
Balbín was born in Hradec Králové into a middle class Roman Catholic family. He was educated mostly in the Jesuit schools, he soon joined the Society of Jesus. After finishing studies in philosophy at University of Olomouc, he taught in Jesuit colleges in Prague, Třeboň, Brno, Jičín, Jindřichův Hradec and Český Krumlov; he was ordained as a priest in 1650.

After writing of several textbooks and didactic theatre plays, he also became acquainted with historical sources of archives and libraries. His entire life was devoted to collecting and editing materials about Czech history. His researches have often been utilized by the Bollandists. His association and friendships with noble families was valuable to his research of historical documents.

At the age of 62 he suffered a stroke and needed a scribe to write for him; he died, aged 66, in Prague and is buried at the Church of St. Salvator in Prague.

== Work ==
He wrote over thirty works, the most important from which is Miscellanea Historica regni Bohemiae ("Varieties from the History of the Czech Kingdom" ", 6 vols., Prague, 1679–87), in which he described the geography, natural history, and chief historical events of his native land. The work includes brief vitae of prominent Czechs. The sections of the work:

- Miscellanea historica regni Bohemiae - History of the kingdom of Bohemia
- Liber naturalis - The Nature of Bohemia
- Liber popularis - The population
- Liber chorographicus - Topography
- Liber hagiographicus - Czech Saints
- Liber parochialis - The Parishes
- Liber episcopalis - The Archdiocese of Prague
- Liber regalis - Rulers
- Liber epistolaris - Series of letters
- Bohemia Docta - Czech literature and teaching
- Liber de seu curialis magistratibus et officiis curialibus regem Bohemiae - Paper on Courts and Offices of the Czech Crown

Bohuslav Balbín (Balbinus) is known in Czech Lands mostly for his "Apology for the Slavic and especially Czech language", written in Latin. He was the first to edit the ancient chronicle of the tenth century known as the Life of St. Ludmilla and Martyrdom of St. Wenceslas, which is considered the oldest historical work written in the Czech lands by a Czech (written in Latin). Balbinus wrote also De archiepiscopis Bohemiae ("The Archbishops of Bohemia", Prague, 1682) and Bohemia Sancta, sive de sanctis Bohemiae, Moraviae, Silesiae, Lusatiae ("Sacred Bohemia, or the Saints of Bohemia, Moravia, Silesia and Lusatia" Prague, 1682). His book Vita beatae Joannis Nepomuceni martyris (Life of Saint and martyr John of Nepomuk) was published in Prague, 1670, is in large part responsible for the developed legend of Saint John of Nepomuk. Balbin also wrote one reference book about stylistics (1666) and two works devoted to rhetoric (1677, 1688).

== Bibliography ==
- Legatio Apollinis coelestis ad universitatem Pragensem etc.
- Vita venerabilis Arnesti (biography of Arnošt of Pardubice, the first Archbishop of Prague), 1664
- Verisimilia humaniorum disciplinarunm seu judicium privatum de omni letterarum, quasi humaniores appellent, artificio. 1666.
- Dissertatio apologetica pro lingua Slavonica, praecipue Bohemica. 1775. (In Czech: Obrana jazyka slovanského, zvláště českého. 1869)
- Vita S. Joannis Nepomuceni sigilli sacramentalis protomartyris
- Epitome rerum Bohemicarum seu historia Boleslaviensis, 1677 (The book about history of Stará Boleslav)
- Quaesita oratoria seu eloquentiae praecepta. 1677
- De archiepiscopis Bohemiae
- Brevis tractatio de amplificatione oratoria. 1688
- Miscellanea historica regni Bohemiae, 1679–88
- Vita et passio sancti Wenceslai et sanctae Ludmilae aviae eius

== See also ==
- List of Czech writers
