= Marta Kubišová =

Czech singer (born 1942)

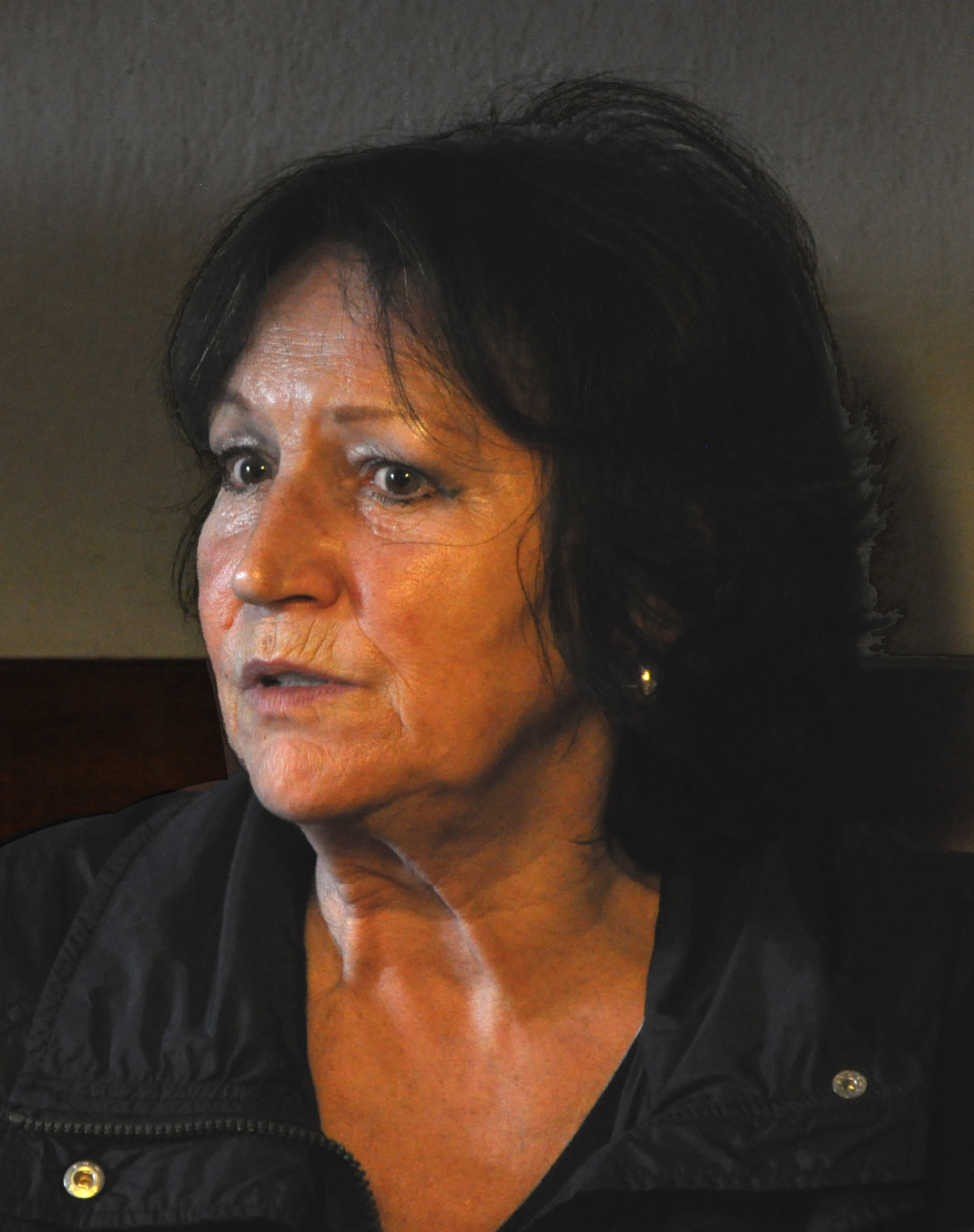
- Kubišová in 2009

Background information
- Born: 1 November 1942 (age 83); České Budějovice, Bohemia and Moravia (now Czech Republic)
- Instrument: Vocals
- Years active: 1961–2017
- Label: Supraphon
- Website: http://kubisova.cz/ http://www.martakubisova.cz/

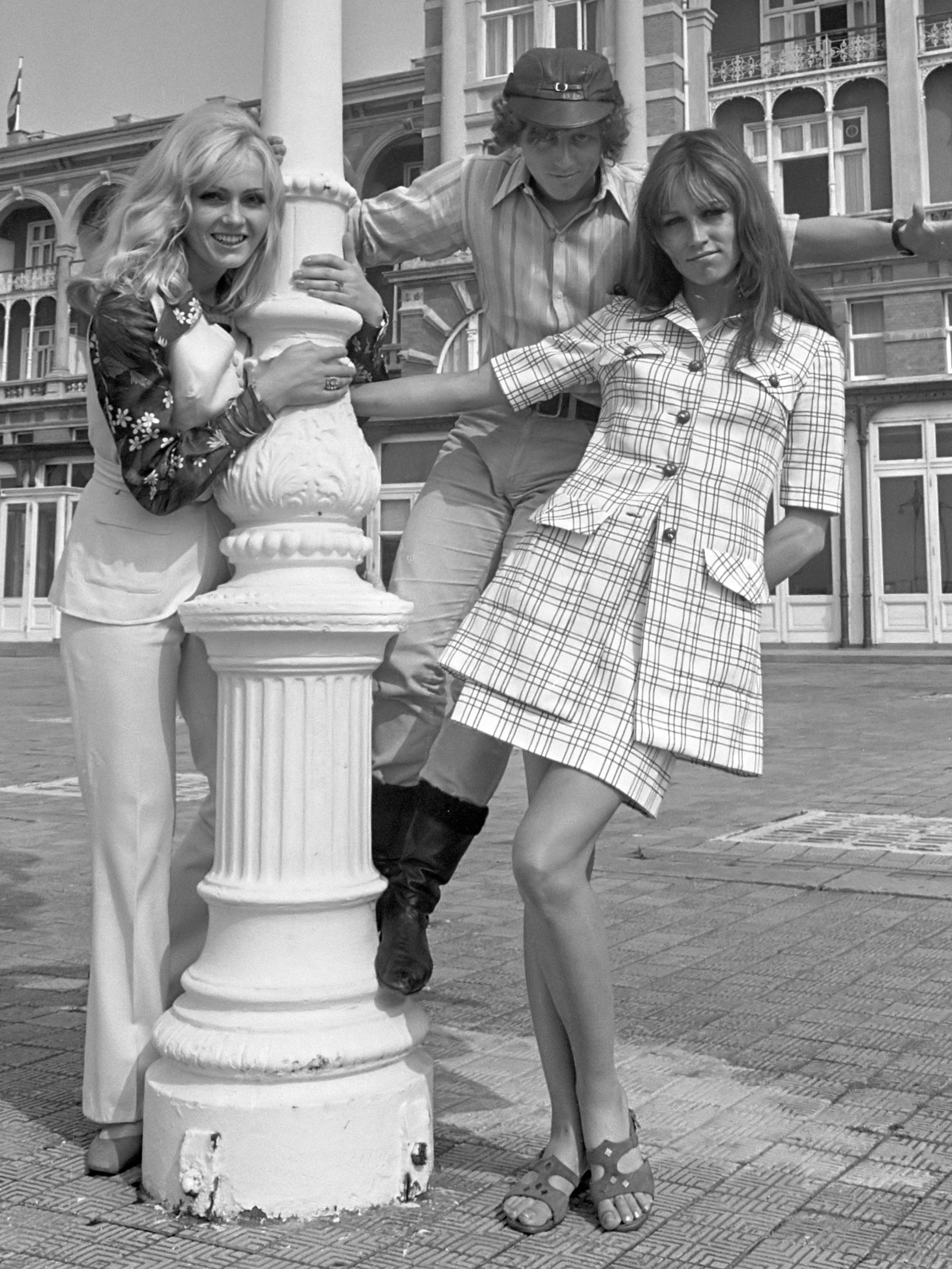
Marta Kubišová, Václav Neckář, Helena Vondráčková (from right to left), as Golden Kids in 1969, shortly before Marta Kubišová was banned

Marta Kubišová (born 1 November 1942) is a Czech singer. By the time of the Prague Spring of 1968, with her song "Modlitba pro Martu" ("A prayer for Marta"), she was one of the most popular female singers in Czechoslovakia.

In 1967 she won Zlatý slavík award (English: Golden Nightingale). Her song "Prayer for Marta" became a symbol of national resistance against the occupation of Warsaw Pact troops in 1968. During the Prague Spring, she recorded over 200 SP records and one LP, Songy a Balady (Songs and Ballads, released in 1969), which was immediately banned from stores. In 1970, the regime also banned her from any performing. In 1971, she arranged Angelo Michajlov's score for Dívka na Koštěti (The Girl on a Broomstick). She was a signatory of the Charter 77 proclamation and one of its spokesmen.

Her first LPs after the Velvet Revolution in 1989 were a re-issue of Songy a Balady and a compilation of old songs, titled Lampa.

== Biography ==
Born 1 November 1942 in České Budějovice, Kubišová's father was a cardiologist, her mother was a housewife, who later sold records in Celetná street in Prague. In 1952 the family moved to Poděbrady. Wanting to get to college after graduating from high school, she started to work in Poděbrady glassworks.

Her singing career began with a dance group which performed in Nymburk at the afternoon teas. In 1961, she reached the finals in Hledáme nové talenty ("The Search for Talent"). In 1962, she lost her job in the glass factory, and auditioned for the Stop Theatre in Pardubice. In 1963, she moved to Theatre Alpha in Plzeň to perform in Black Dream, a production by Ludvík Aškenazy.

She began collaborating with Václav Neckář and Helena Vondráčková in December 1965, when preparing for performances of Waiting for Fame. In 1967 she won Zlatý slavík. A song, "Prayer for Marta", with lyrics by Petr Rada, became a symbol of national resistance against the occupation of Warsaw Pact troops in 1968. On 1 November of that year, she joined with Neckář and Vondráčková to create the popular group, 'Golden Kids'. In 1969 she won her second Zlatý slavík award and married film director Jan Němec. A year later, she won the Zlatý slavík a third time, but she had to receive the award in secrecy of the office of the Mladý svět magazine due to the commencing normalization. The last performance of the Golden Kids took place on 27 January 1970 in Ostrava.

In February 1970, the government banned her from singing or performing and tried to damage her reputation, a.o. on with three falsified photo-montages with her and Alexander Dubček. Nor was she allowed to record her songs.

She took the director of the record label Supraphon, Hrabal, active in her persecution, to court for libel. She won formally, yet had her rights fully restored 20 years later, after the Czechoslovak communist regime fell in 1989.

During that time, she could only perform at underground invitation-only events. In the late 1980s, she auditioned to become singer of the group The Plastic People of the Universe, but this was disallowed by the secret police.

In 1971, she suffered a miscarriage in the eighth month of pregnancy and survived clinical death. She married director Jan Moravec after divorcing her husband Jan Nemec, who had emigrated to the United States.

After signing Charter 77, her persecution and monitoring by the communist state secret police escalated. From 1977 to 1978 she participated as a spokesperson for Charter 77.

On 1 June 1979, she gave birth to her daughter Kateřina.

On 10 December 1988 after a long absence from the public eye, she appeared at a demonstration on the 40th anniversary of the Universal Declaration of Human Rights, during which she sang the Czechoslovak national anthem.

On 22 November 1989, during the Velvet Revolution, she sang "Prayer for Martha" and the Czechoslovak national anthem from a balcony on Wenceslas Square. Then followed the reissue of Songy a Balady, and in 1990 she returned to the studio and the stage.

On 2 June 1990 she performed the famous show "Marta v Lucerně", for which she was awarded the Golden Nightingale in 1970. The music was performed by the group Energit and directed by Lubos Andršt, with whom she then went on tour to perform 60 concerts around Czechoslovakia, as well as shows in Japan, Paris and Berlin. In 1991 she co-hosted Advent concerts.

Two years later she rejoined with Vondráčková and Neckář in a Golden Kids comeback. On 28 October 1995 she received the state award – the Medal of Merit – from President Václav Havel. Adam Georgiev released her biography, Chytat slunce (Catching the Sun), in 1995. On 7 March 1998, she was awarded the Honorary Medal of T.G. Masaryk at a ceremony in the ballroom of Prague Castle. In October 2002, she was bestowed with the St. Wenceslas Honours. Three years later, her second biographical book Asi to tak sám Bůh chtěl, written by Luboš Nečas, was published.

For several years, she regularly prepared recitals on her home stage at the Prague Ungelt Theatre. There she also appeared in a chamber musical Líp se loučí v neděli, and was awarded the Thalia prize for her performance. In 2005 she released a novelty album, Vítej, lásko, the full text to which was written by John Schneider. In 2008 Supraphon released her first DVD.

In 2011 the play by Małgorzata Sikorska-Miszczuk based on Kubišová's life was staged at International Theatre Festival DEMOLUDY in Olsztyn, Poland.

On 1 January 2018 Kubišová received a state award the Order of the White Double Cross (second class) from President of Slovakia Andrej Kiska.

== Discography ==
=== Golden Kids ===
- Micro Magic Circus (Supraphon, 1969)
- Golden Kids 1 (Supraphon, 1970)

=== Solo ===
- Songy a balady (1969, 1990, 1996)
- Lampa (1990)
- Někdy si zpívám (1991)
- Songy a nálady (1993)
- Řeka vůni (1995)
- Singly 1 (1996)
- Bůh ví (1996)
- Nechte zvony znít (Singly 2) (1997)
- Dejte mi kousek louky (Singly 3) (1998)
- Modlitba (Singly 4) (1999)
- Marta Kubišova v Ungeltu (1999)
- Tajga Blues (Singly 5) (2000)
- Já jsem já (2004)
- Vítej, lásko (2005)
- In my world
- Vyznaní (2010)
- Touha jménem Einodis (2013)
- Magický hlas rebelky (2014)
- Soul (2016)

== Films and TV ==
- Pátrání po Ester (2005)
- Kameňák 2 (2004)
- Zdivočelá země II (2001)
- Zpověď Ungelt (2000)
- Noční hovory s matkou (1999)
- Stalo se na podzim (1994)
- Hodnota tváře (1992)
- Zvláštní bytosti (1990)
- Dívka na Koštěti (1971) (arranger)
- Vražda ing. Čerta (1970)
- Proudy lásku odnesou (1969) (TV)
- Bylo čtvrt a bude půl (1968)
- Kulhavý ďábel (1968)
- Gramo / Hit 68 (1968) (TV)
- Náhrdelník melancholie - Sedm písní Marty Kubišové (1968)
- Jak se krade milión (1967)
- Píseň pro Rudolfa III. (1967)
- Mučedníci lásky (1966)
- Vysílá studio A (1966)
- Revue v mlze (1966)

about

- Magický hlas rebelky (The Magic Voice of a Rebel), by Olga Sommerová, documentary, 90min, Czech republic (2014), camera: Olga Malířová Špátová, with Marta Kubišová, Jiří Černý, Fero Fenič, Václav Havel (from earlier footage), Milan Hein, Jaroslav Hutka, Iva Janžurová, Pavel Kohout, Petr Koura, Aneta Langerová, Petr Malásek, Kateřina Moravcová (daughter of Marta Kubišová), Václav Neckář, Dana Němcová, Karel Štolba, Vlastimil Třešňák (Film auf imdb.com)
