= Anticharter =

1977 pro-Communist signature campaign in Czechoslovakia

The Anticharter (Czech/Slovak: Anticharta or officially, Za nové tvůrčí činy ve jménu socialismu a míru / Za nové tvorivé činy v mene socializmu a mieru [For New Creative Actions in the Name of Socialism and Peace]) was the 1977 reaction of the Communist Czechoslovak ruling power under Gustáv Husák, combined with a signature campaign by prominent cultural figures, condemning Charter 77, a civic initiative drawn up by Václav Havel and Pavel Kohout, among others, in 1976.

== Background ==
=== Charter 77 ===
In 1976, a number of individuals from the artistic scene, including Jiří Němec, Václav Benda, Ladislav Hejdánek, Václav Havel, Jan Patočka, Zdeněk Mlynář, Jiří Hájek, Martin Palouš, Pavel Kohout, and Ladislav Lis put together a document critical of the Communist government, titled Charter 77, partly in response to the arrest of the rock band Plastic People of the Universe. Signatures were gathered, and the document was published on 6 January 1977. It was disseminated illegally within Czechoslovakia, and several international newspapers published the full text of the document. Government retaliation was swift and included dismissal from work, denial of educational opportunities for children of signatories, forced exile, loss of citizenship, and imprisonment.

=== Government response to Charter 77—Anticharter ===
On 12 January 1977, the daily Rudé právo newspaper published an article under the title Ztroskotanci a samozvanci (The Wayward and the Self-Righteous), defaming the text of Charter 77, and on 28 January, national artists, actors, and other cultural personalities were invited to the National Theatre in Prague. At the rally, actress Jiřina Švorcová read the call "Calling up Czechoslovak art union committees" (Czech: Provolání československých výborů uměleckých svazů), expressing loyalty to the communist regime, which wanted, among other things, to legitimize the persecution of Charter 77 signatories and discourage further similar declarations. In the following days, the Anticharter was signed by a number of leading artists of the Czechoslovak Socialist Republic. The list of signatories was published by Rudé právo on 30 January. A similar gathering was held on 4 February 1977 at Prague's Music Theatre, where the statement was read by singer Eva Pilarová. According to the Institute for the Study of Totalitarian Regimes (formed in 2007), over 7,000 artists added their name to the initiative.

Several individuals later either denied having signed the declaration, or claimed that they were pressured into or simply misled about what they were signing. One of these was prominent actor and playwright Jan Werich. Dagmar Havlová, who went on to marry Václav Havel, later also claimed that she would not have signed the document and was puzzled that her name appeared on it.

Others, including Bohumil Hrabal and Vladimír Neff, by signing the Anticharter, regained certain publishing opportunities that the regime had deprived them of due to their public opposition to the 1968 Soviet occupation of Czechoslovakia.

A number of prominent artists refused to sign the Anticharter, however, and were duly penalized for it by the ruling regime. This included documentarian Kristina Vlachová, who was subsequently unable to perform her profession until 1989, as well as the entire collective of Divadlo Husa na provázku. Actor Luděk Munzar, who, together with his wife Jana Hlaváčová also refused to sign the document, stated in a 2013 interview, "The Communists made the Anticharter and I did not sign it, but I did not talk about it anywhere. [...]it's very difficult for me to explain today when I suddenly find out how many heroes there were then". Other notable individuals who did not sign were Vladimír Mišík, Táňa Fischerová, Martin Štěpánek, and Helena Vondráčková.

As of 2017, several signatores have apologized for their complicity in the document, including Zdeněk Svěrák, Michal Pavlata, Jiří Ornest, and Eva Pilarová. Actor Jan Hrušínský admitted that he was not brave enough to refuse signing, and he later regretted it. Film director Jiří Menzel, on the other hand, stated in an interview that the majority of people in Czechoslovakia served the regime at the time, and that he was not ashamed of his signature; rather, it was a disgrace to those who forced him to sign.
