= Milan Balabán =

Czech theologian and professor (1929–2019)

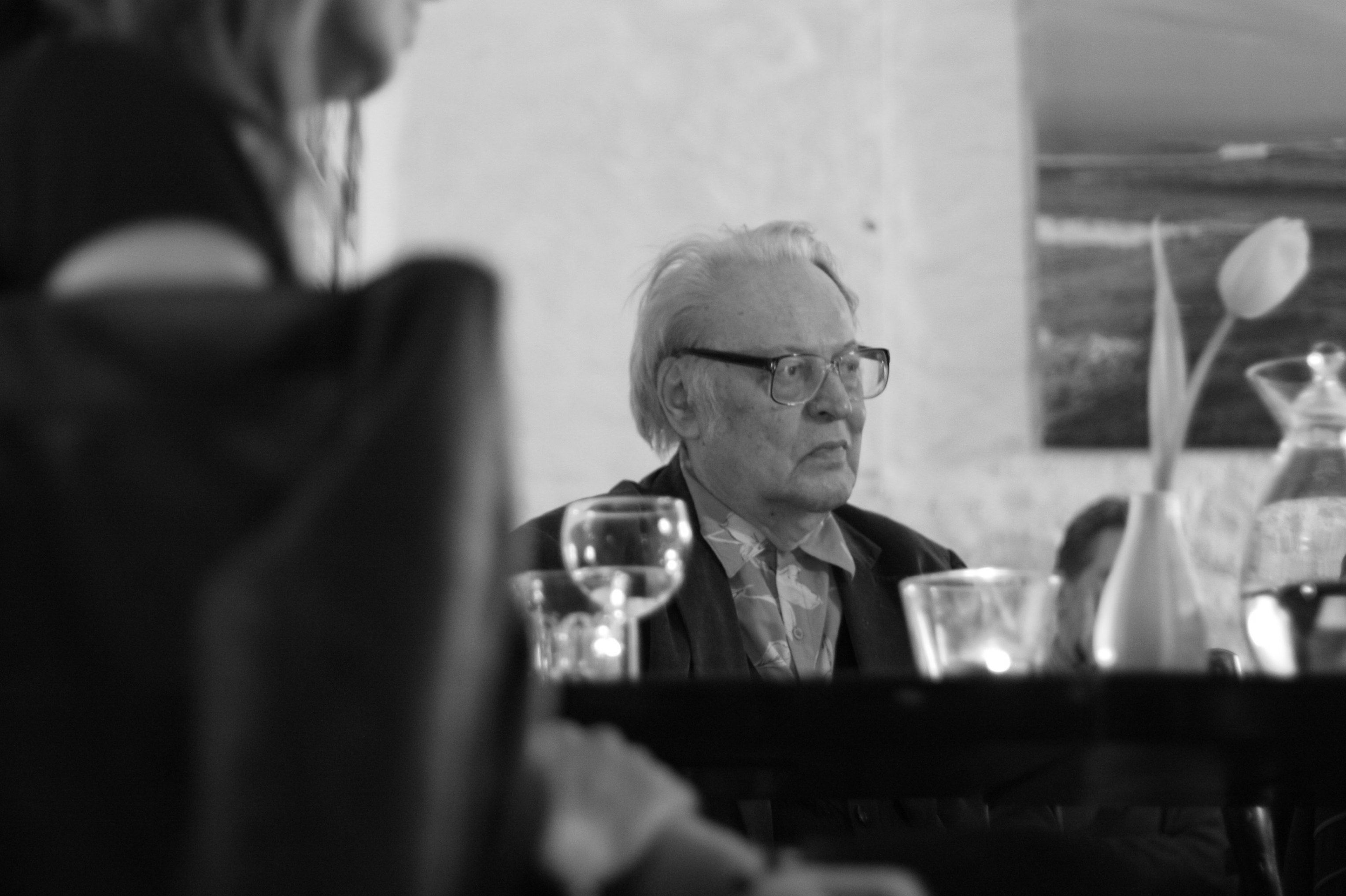
Balabán in 2010

Milan Balabán (3 September 1929 – 4 January 2019) was a Czech theologian, professor of religion and the Old Testament, Evangelical Church of Czech Brethren (ECCB) pastor, and poet. Balabán, an anti-communist dissident during Czechoslovakia's communist era, was a Charter 77 signatory. He was also among of group of Czech Old Testament scholars who wrote and translated the Old Testament theologians the Czech Ecumenical Translation of the Bible, which remains the most widely used Czech language translation of the Bible today.

== Biography ==
Balabán was born on 3 September 1929 in the village of Boratyn, Tarnopol Voivodeship, Poland (now located in present-day Ukraine). He graduated from the Protestant Theological Faculty (Evangelická teologická fakulta Univerzity Karlovy) at Charles University and became a minister in the Evangelical Church of Czech Brethren.

Balabán joined the Nová orientace (New Orientation), a group of Protestant Evangelical theologians and clergy which advocated for democratic reforms in Czechoslovakia, during the 1950s. He continued to push for democratic reforms throughout the 1950s, 1960s, and 1970s, as an anti-communist dissident. As a result, the communist Czechoslovak Socialist Republic authorities revoked his license to serve as a clergyman in 1974. He was forced to work manual labor jobs, which included time in the Prague city sewer system.

Balabán signed the Charter 77, which called for human rights and democratic reforms in Czechoslovakia.

Milan Balabán died on 4 January 2019 in Libice nad Cidlinou, Czech Republic, at the age of 89.

== Awards ==
- Medal of Merit (October 2002), awarded by President Václav Havel, a fellow Charter 77 dissident.
