= Krob =

Krob may refer to:

- KROB, a Texas radio station

== People ==
- Andrej Krob (born 1938), Czech theater director and screenwriter
- Jan Krob, Czech footballer
- K-Rob, American rapper
