= Jaroslav Kořán =

Czech translator, actor, writer, screenwriter and politician

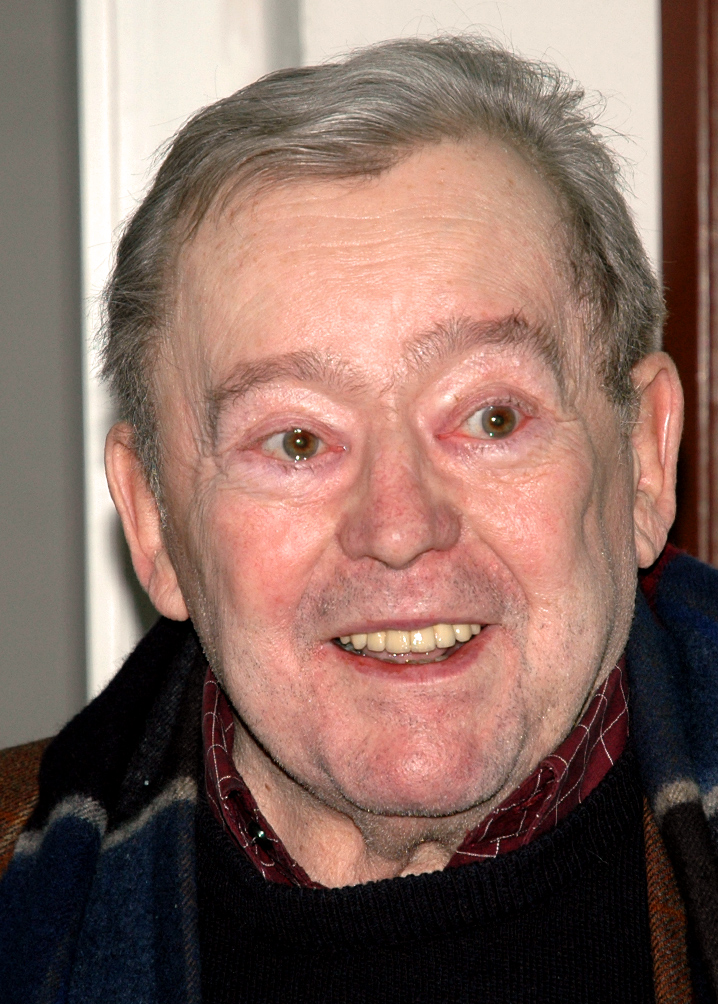
- Kořán in December 2012

Mayor of Prague
- In office 1 February 1990 – 13 September 1991
- Preceded by: Josef Hájek
- Succeeded by: Milan Kondr

Personal details
- Born: 17 January 1940 Prague, Protectorate of Bohemia and Moravia
- Died: 2 June 2017 (aged 77)
- Education: Academy of Performing Arts in Prague

Jaroslav Kořán (17 January 1940 – 2 June 2017) was a Czech translator, actor, writer, screenwriter, and politician. A dissident and signatory of Charter 77 during Czechoslovakia's Communist era, Kořán translated over seven dozen books, mostly by American writers, from English into Czech, including major works by Kurt Vonnegut, Henry Miller, Roald Dahl, Ken Kesey, Charles Bukowski, John Kennedy Toole, and John Wyndham.

Kořán was one of the co-founders of the Civic Forum (OF) political movement in November 1989. In February 1990, Kořán was elected Mayor of Prague, becoming the city's first non-Communist since 1948. He served as mayor until September 1991.

== Biography ==
Kořán studied drama and film at the Academy of Performing Arts in Prague. He then wrote documentary scripts and radio plays before transitioning to television journalism. However, in 1973, he and several friends were arrested for singing anti-Russian songs at a restaurant. Kořán was sentenced to one year in prison for "slandering the state and hooliganism" due to the song. After his release, Kořán worked as a laborer digging trenches in the Prague sewer system.

Despite these setbacks, Kořán translated more than 70 works of American literature into Czech during the 1970s and 1980s. Some of the major works he translated included books authored by Kurt Vonnegut, Henry Miller, Roald Dahl, and Ken Kesey. Kořán's translation of Kurt Vonnegut's "Slaughterhouse-Five", was uncredited because Kořán was serving his one-year prison term at the time of its publication.

On 10 December 1976 Kořán was present at the first meeting of the Charter 77 signatories. Other members present at the meeting included Václav Havel, Pavel Kohout, Jiří Němec, Zdeněk Mlynář, and Václav Vendelín Komeda. Charter 77 was published in January 1977 with the names of 242 signatories, including Kořán.

Years later, Kořán co-founded the Civic Forum in November 1989 during the Velvet Revolution. Kořán, who was also a professional photographer, covered the fall of Communism in 1989 for the Reuters news agency.

He also worked as the editor-and-chief of the Czech edition of Playboy during the 1990s.

Jaroslav Kořán died on June 2, 2017, at the age of 77.
