= Charter 77 =

1977 civic initiative in Czechoslovakia

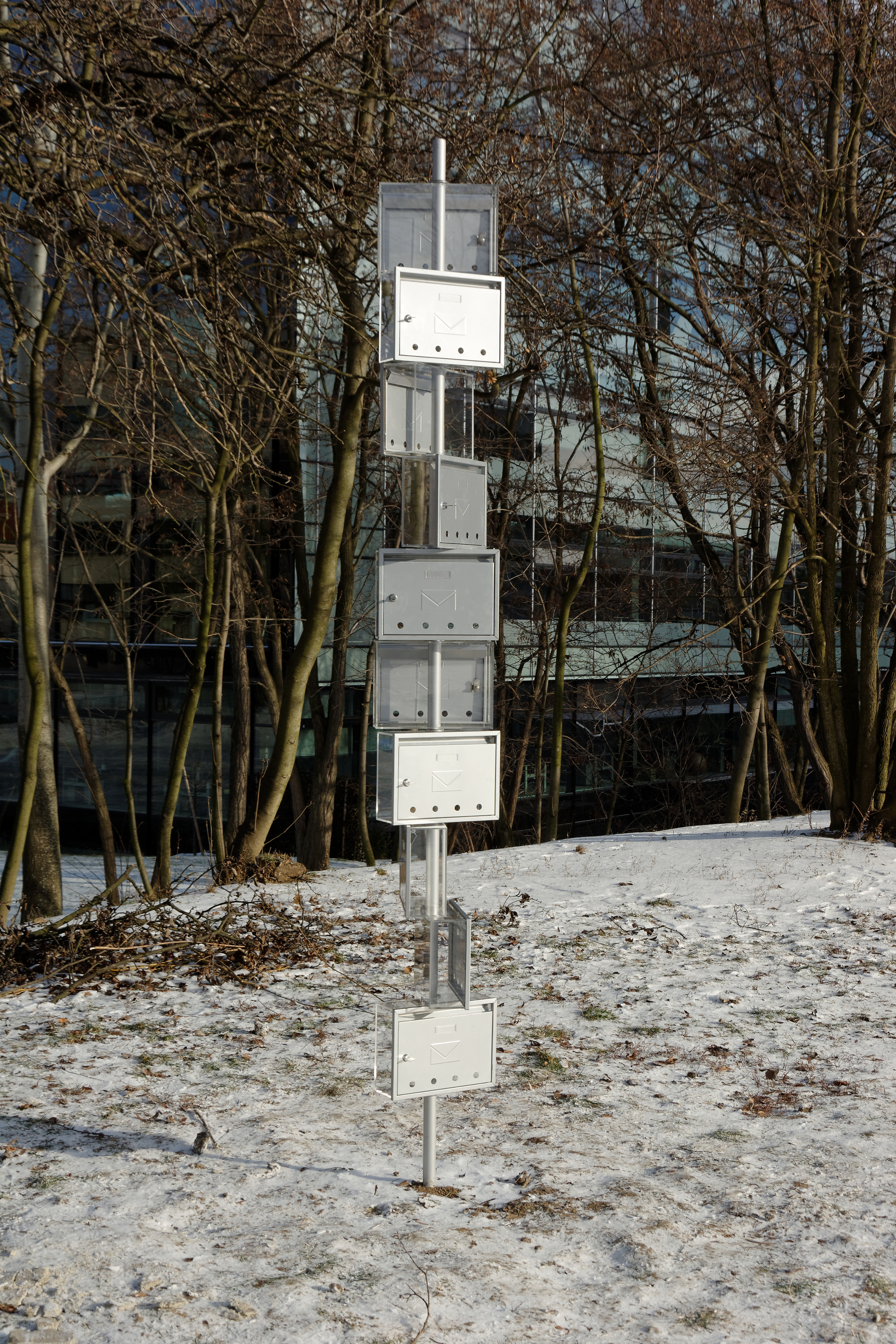
Charter 77 memorial in Prague

Charter 77 (Charta 77 in Czech and Slovak) was an informal civic initiative in the Czechoslovak Socialist Republic from 1976 to 1992, named after the document Charter 77 from January 1977. Founding members and architects were Jiří Němec, Václav Benda, Ladislav Hejdánek, Václav Havel, Jan Patočka, Zdeněk Mlynář, Jiří Hájek, Martin Palouš, Pavel Kohout, and Ladislav Lis. Spreading the text of the document was considered a political crime by the Czechoslovak government. After the 1989 Velvet Revolution, many of the members of the initiative played important roles in Czech and Slovak politics.

== Founding and political aims ==
Motivated in part by the arrest of members of the rock band the Plastic People of the Universe, the text of Charter 77 was prepared in 1976. The first preparatory meeting took place on 10 December 1976 in Jaroslav Kořán's apartment, and initial signatures were collected.

The charter was published on 6 January 1977, along with the names of the first 242 signatories, which represented various occupations, political viewpoints, and religions. Although Václav Havel, Ludvík Vaculík, and Pavel Landovský were detained while trying to bring the charter to the Federal Assembly and the Czechoslovak government, and the original document was confiscated, copies circulated as samizdat and on 7 January were published in several western newspapers, including Le Monde, Frankfurter Allgemeine Zeitung, and The Times, and transmitted within Czechoslovakia by Czechoslovak-banned radio broadcasters like Radio Free Europe and Voice of America. Almost three weeks later, on 27 January, it was also published in The New York Times.

Charter 77 criticized the government for failing to implement the human rights provisions of a number of documents it had signed, including the 1960 Constitution of Czechoslovakia, the Final Act of the 1975 Conference on Security and Cooperation in Europe (Basket III of the Helsinki Accords), and the 1966 United Nations covenants on political, civil, economic, and cultural rights. The document also described the signatories as a "loose, informal, and open association of people . . . united by the will to strive individually and collectively for respect for human and civil rights in our country and throughout the world". It emphasized that Charter 77 is not an organization, has no statutes or permanent organs, and "does not form the basis for any oppositional political activity". This final stipulation was a careful effort to stay within the bounds of the Czechoslovak legal system, which made organized opposition illegal.

Many of the organization's activists and members gathered on 29 March 2007 at the Orange Tree Theatre in Richmond, London, to observe the movement's 30th anniversary and to discuss the historical impact their movement generated in modern European politics.

== Reaction of the government ==
The government's reaction to the appearance of Charter 77 was harsh. The official press described the manifesto as "an anti-state, anti-socialist, and demagogic, abusive piece of writing", and individual signatories were variously described as "traitors and renegades", "a loyal servant and agent of imperialism", "a bankrupt politician", and "an international adventurer". As it was considered to be an illegal document, the full text of Charter 77 was never published in the official press. However, an official group of artists and writers mobilized into an "anti-charter" movement that included Czechoslovakia's foremost singer Karel Gott, as well as prominent comedic writer Jan Werich, who later claimed he was misled about the nature of the document he was signing.

Several means of retaliation were used against the signatories, including dismissal from work, denial of educational opportunities for their children, forced exile, loss of citizenship, and detention, trial, and imprisonment. Many members were forced to collaborate with the communist secret service (the StB, Czech: Státní bezpečnost).

The treatment of Charter 77 signatories prompted the creation in April 1978 of a support group, the Committee for the Defense of the Unjustly Prosecuted (Výbor na obranu nespravedlivě stíhaných – VONS), to publicize the fate of those associated with the charter. In October 1979, six leaders of this support group, including Václav Havel, were tried for subversion and sentenced to prison terms of up to five years.

Repression of Charter 77 and VONS members continued during the 1980s. Despite unrelenting harassment and arrests, however, the groups continued to issue reports on the government's violations of human rights. Until the Velvet Revolution, Charter 77 had approximately 1,900 signatories.

== Influence ==
Under the Communist government, the influence of Charter 77 remained limited. It did not reach wide groups of people and most of its members were from Prague. The majority of Czechoslovak citizens knew of the initiative only because of the government's campaign against it.

In the late 1980s, as the Eastern Bloc Revolutions of 1989 gathered momentum, members of Charter 77 saw their opportunity and became more involved in organizing opposition against the ruling authority. During the days of the Velvet Revolution, members of the group negotiated the smooth transfer of political power from dictatorship to democracy. Many were elevated into high positions in the government (e.g., Václav Havel became the President of Czechoslovakia) but since most had no experience in active politics (such as skills in diplomacy or knowledge of capitalism), they met with mixed success.

Charter 77 included people who had a wide range of opinions and, after reaching their common goal, the group's presence faded. An attempt to make the group the focal point of an all-encompassing political party (the Civic Forum) failed and in 1992, the initiative dissolved.

== List of signatories ==
There are 1,882 known signatories of Charter 77. Notable names include:

- Milan Balabán
- Karel Bartošek
- Jaroslav Bašta
- Rudolf Battěk
- Otta Bednářová
- Jarmila Bělíková
- Václav Benda
- Rudolf Bereza
- Pavel Bergmann
- Ivan Bierhanzl
- Tereza Boučková
- Vratislav Brabenec
- Toman Brod
- František Bublan
- Václav Černý
- Mikoláš Chadima
- Vlasta Chramostová
- Petr Cibulka
- Ivan Dejmal
- Ľudovít Didi
- Jiří Dienstbier
- Luboš Dobrovský
- Bohumil Doležal
- Vratislav Effenberger
- Anna Fárová
- Jiří Gruntorád
- Jiří Gruša
- Jiří Hájek
- Miloš Hájek
- Jiří Hanák
- Jiří Hanzelka
- Václav Havel
- Olga Havlová
- Zbyněk Hejda
- Ladislav Hejdánek
- Josef Hiršal
- Vladimír Hučín
- Jaroslav Hutka
- Ludmila Jankovcová
- Zdeněk Jičínský
- Ivan Martin Jirous
- Juliana Jirousová
- Pavel Juráček
- Petr Kabeš
- Eva Kantůrková
- Svatopluk Karásek
- Alexandr Kliment
- Vladimír Klokočka
- Milan Kohout
- Pavel Kohout
- Jiří Kolář
- Božena Komárková
- Jan Křen
- František Kriegel
- Jiří Křižan
- Andrej Krob
- Marta Kubišová
- Miroslav Kusý
- Pavel Landovský
- Miroslav Lehký
- František Lízna
- Milan Machovec
- Václav Malý
- Ivan Mašek
- Jelena Mašínová
- Ivan Medek
- Zdeněk Mlynář
- Ján Mlynárik
- Dana Němcová
- Milan Ohnisko
- Eduard Ovčáček
- Martin Palouš
- Radim Palouš
- Jan Patočka
- Jan Petránek
- Petr Pithart
- Hana Ponická
- Vladimír Príkazský
- Lenka Procházková
- Jan Ruml
- Pavel Rychetský
- Jaroslav Šabata
- Anna Šabatová
- Vojtěch Sedláček
- Jaroslav Seifert
- Gertruda Sekaninová-Čakrtová
- Karol Sidon
- Jiřina Šiklová
- Vladimír Škutina
- Otakar Slavík
- Jan Sokol
- Petruška Šustrová
- Dominik Tatarka
- Jan Tesař
- Zdena Tominová
- Jáchym Topol
- Josef Topol
- Jan Trefulka
- Vlastimil Třešňák
- Milan Uhde
- Petr Uhl
- Růžena Vacková
- Ludvík Vaculík
- Jan Vodňanský
- Dáša Vokatá
- Alexandr Vondra
- Jiří Wolf
- Pavel Zajíček

== Award ==
In 1984, Charter 77 received the first Andrei Sakharov Freedom Award.

== See also ==
- Charter 88 – a British movement inspired in part by Charter 77
- Charter 97 – a Belarusian movement inspired in part by Charter 77
- Charter 08 – a Chinese movement inspired in part by Charter 77
- The Two Thousand Words
