= Havel: Unfinished Revolution =

2021 book by David Gilbreath Barton

- Cover
- Author: David Gilbreath Barton
- Subject: The life of Václav Havel
- Genre: Nonfiction, autobiography
- Publisher: University of Pittsburgh Press
- Publication date: October, 2021
- ISBN: 9780822966777

Havel: Unfinished Revolution is a 2021 book by journalist, psychotherapist and academic David Gilbreath Barton.The book is a biography of Czech statesman, playwright and intellect Václav Havel.

== Background ==
Barton, initially intending a joint biography of Jiří Hájek, Jan Patočka, and Václav Havel, narrowed his focus to Havel's story due to its complexity. Barton, deeply interested in Havel's underground years and psychological undercurrents, spent years researching his letters and documents, aiming to explore Havel's ideas and influences. Driven by a desire to understand Havel's character and inner conflicts, Barton embarked on a meticulous journey to unveil the visionary qualities and paradoxes inherent in the life of the Czech leader.

== Synopsis ==
The book delves into the life of Václav Havel, Czechoslovakia's last president, amidst the backdrop of the country's tumultuous political landscape. Barton offers an exploration of Havel's evolution from a dissident playwright to a political leader, shedding light on his underground activism and intellectual journey. Drawing from extensive research, including Havel's personal letters and interviews, Barton uncovers the complexities of Havel's character, his creative process, and his relationships, notably with his wife Olga and confidante Jitka Vodňanská.

== Critical reception ==
David S. Danaher praised the book for its engaging narrative and inclusion of new details sourced from personal interviews and correspondence, providing a vivid portrayal of Václav Havel's life amidst Czechoslovakia's historical backdrop. However, Danaher critiqued the book for prioritizing Havel's personal story over his intellectual contributions, noting a lack of in-depth analysis on Havel's ideas and a failure to engage with existing secondary literature on the subject. Danaher recommended the book as a captivating personal biography but hoped it will be the last, expressing concerns that focusing solely on Havel's personal narrative may overshadow his enduring intellectual, spiritual, and political legacy.

Flagg Taylor highlighted Barton's comprehensive exploration of Václav Havel's life as a playwright, dissident, and statesman. He commended the author for effectively portraying Havel's philosophical reflections, his involvement in cultural and civic politics, and his enduring relevance in today's context. Taylor stressed Barton's attention to detail, including insights into Havel's personal experiences and the ideological challenges he faced. Taylor wrote:

Barton’s book is a welcome addition to the growing literature on this remarkable, and very much still relevant, writer, thinker, and statesman.
