= Ľudovít Didi =

Slovak Romani teacher and novelist

- Born: 16 January 1931; Púchov, Czechoslovakia
- Died: September 15, 2013 (aged 82); Vráble, Slovakia
- Education: Teachers' Institute of Nitra
- Known for: Slovak teacher, first Romani novelist in the Slovak language

Ľudovít Didi (16 January 1931 – 15 September 2013) was a Slovak teacher, dissident, participant in the anti-Communist struggle, and the first Romani novelist in Slovak literature.

== Biography ==
Didi was born on 16 January 1931 in Púchov as the natural child of Romani parents. He was raised by his maternal grandparents. His grandfather Ondrej Didi was a famous Romani musician. Didi attended elementary school and middle school in Púchov. However, his parents were poor and unable to provide him with further education. Although he was accepted to the Teacher's Institute in Bánovce nad Bebravou, he did not begin studies there due to lack of funds. He therefore moved to Bratislava, where he began tutoring the sons of an affluent Bulgarian gentleman in exchange for free room and board. In 1951 he began studying at what is today the Prague University of Economics and Business, from which he was eventually expelled because of his political views.

In 1959–1963, he completed a degree in secondary education at the Teachers' Institute in Nitra. After graduation, he worked at various smaller schools throughout the country. In 1966–1974, he became the head teacher at Special Education School in Vráble. He was fired from this position in 1974 for his "anti-socialist" views.

In the following years, Didi and his family experienced various hardships. They were surveilled by the secret police, the ŠtB, their oldest son was only able to continue to university after three attempts, and their second son and their daughter had to start with apprenticeships and then eventually entered college after several detours.

Didi died in Vráble on 15 September 2013, at the age of 82.

== Rehabilitation ==
In 1980, along with his wife Mária, he met the mother of Marta Kubišová and as factory workers signed Charter 77. After the fall of Communism in 1989 the National Committee in the district of Nitra rehabilitated him, and he became the director of a children's home in Kolíňany. There he worked as a director until 1998. In 1992 the Prague University of Economics and Business, after his complete rehabilitation, awarded him the Ing. degree. In 2007 the National Memory Institute granted him the status of "participant in the anti-Communist struggle."

== Works ==
Ľudovít Didi lived and worked in Vráble. He started writing books only after his retirement in 2001. He was the first authentically Romani novelist in Slovak literature.

- Príbehy svätené vetrom. [Stories Sanctified by the Wind] Bratislava, 2004
- Cigánkina veštba. [A Gypsy Fortune Teller] Bratislava, 2008
- Róm Tardek a jeho osud. [The Roma Tardek and His Fate] Bratislava, 2013
- Čierny Róm a biela láska. [The Black Roma and His White Love] Bratislava, 2011

== Awards ==
- 2023 – Ľudovít Štúr Prize, 3rd class for extraordinary service to the development of democracy and to the protection of human rights and freedoms.
