= Jan Křen =

Czech historian (1930–2020)

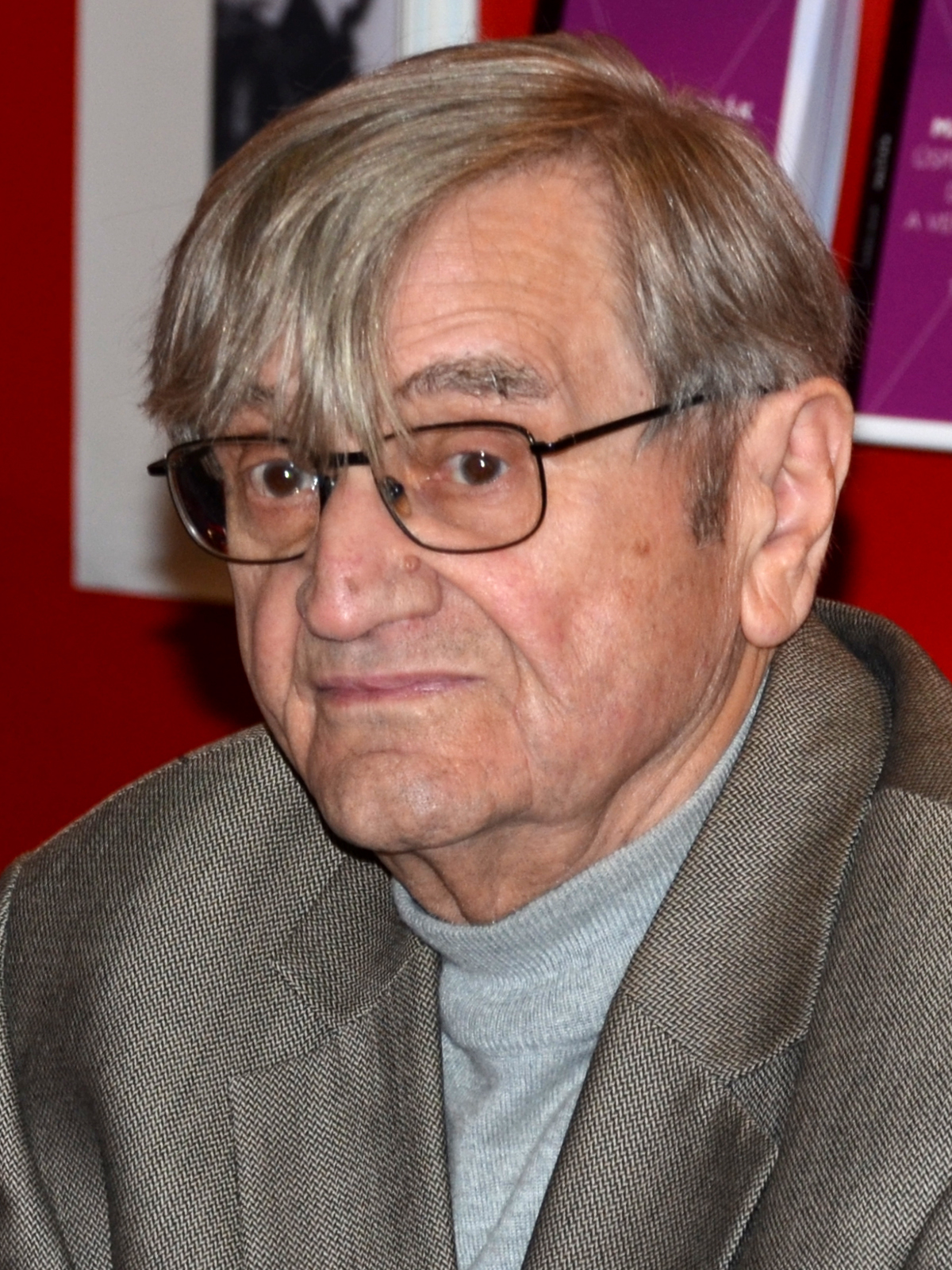
- Jan Křen in 2014
- Born: 22 August 1930; Prague, Czechoslovakia
- Died: 7 April 2020 (aged 89); Prague, Czech Republic
- Occupation: Historian

Jan Křen (22 August 1930 – 7 April 2020) was a Czech historian, academic, dissident during Czechoslovakia's communist era, and a Charter 77 signatory. He specialized in the study of Czech-German relations.

== Career ==
In 1960s, Křen became one of the first Czechoslovak historians to document and research the expulsion of the Sudeten Germans from the country at the end of World War II. He was originally a member of the Communist Party of Czechoslovakia from 1949 to 1969, but was expelled in 1970 over his opposition to the Warsaw Pact invasion. Křen was also fired as professor and forced to work as a manual laborer. He became involved with the pro-democracy dissident movement, being one of the founding signatories of Charter 77 and began holding a series of underground seminars held covertly in apartments and universities. Křen was also a co-founder of the Samizdat historical studies journal. In 1980s, he published one of his best known books, "Conflicting Communities. Czechs and Germans 1780–1918", through his own Sixty-Eight Publishers – an illegal, underground publisher. The book was later published in Germany.

In 1989, Křen founded the Institute of International Studies at Charles University and served as its first director. He also co-founded and chaired the Czech-German Commission of Historians and was involved with the Czech-German Fund of the Future. Křen was a visiting professor at German universities in Berlin, Bremen and Marburg.

President of Germany awarded Křen the Order of Merit of the Federal Republic of Germany in 2000. In 2002, President of the Czech Republic Václav Havel, a fellow Charter 77 signatory, awarded Křen the Medal of Merit. He also won the 2006 Magnesia Litera book award for best educational book for "Two Centuries of Central Europe."

== Death ==
Křen was believed to have contracted COVID-19 at the nursing home where he lived in the Michle district of Prague in March 2020. On 7 April 2020, he died from at the age of 89 due to the COVID-19 pandemic in the Czech Republic.

== Awards ==
- Goethe Medal (1996)
- Order of Merit of the Federal Republic of Germany (2000)
- Medal of Merit of the Czech Republic (2002)
- Magnesia Litera Award for educational literature book of the year (2006)
