= Třešňák =

Třešňák is a Czech surname. Notable people with the surname include:

- Karel Třešňák (born 1949), Czechoslovak slalom canoer
- Vlastimil Třešňák (born 1950), Czech folk singer, songwriter, dissident and author
- Lukáš Třešňák (born 1988), Czech football
