= Milan Kohout =

Czech-American artist, writer and lecturer

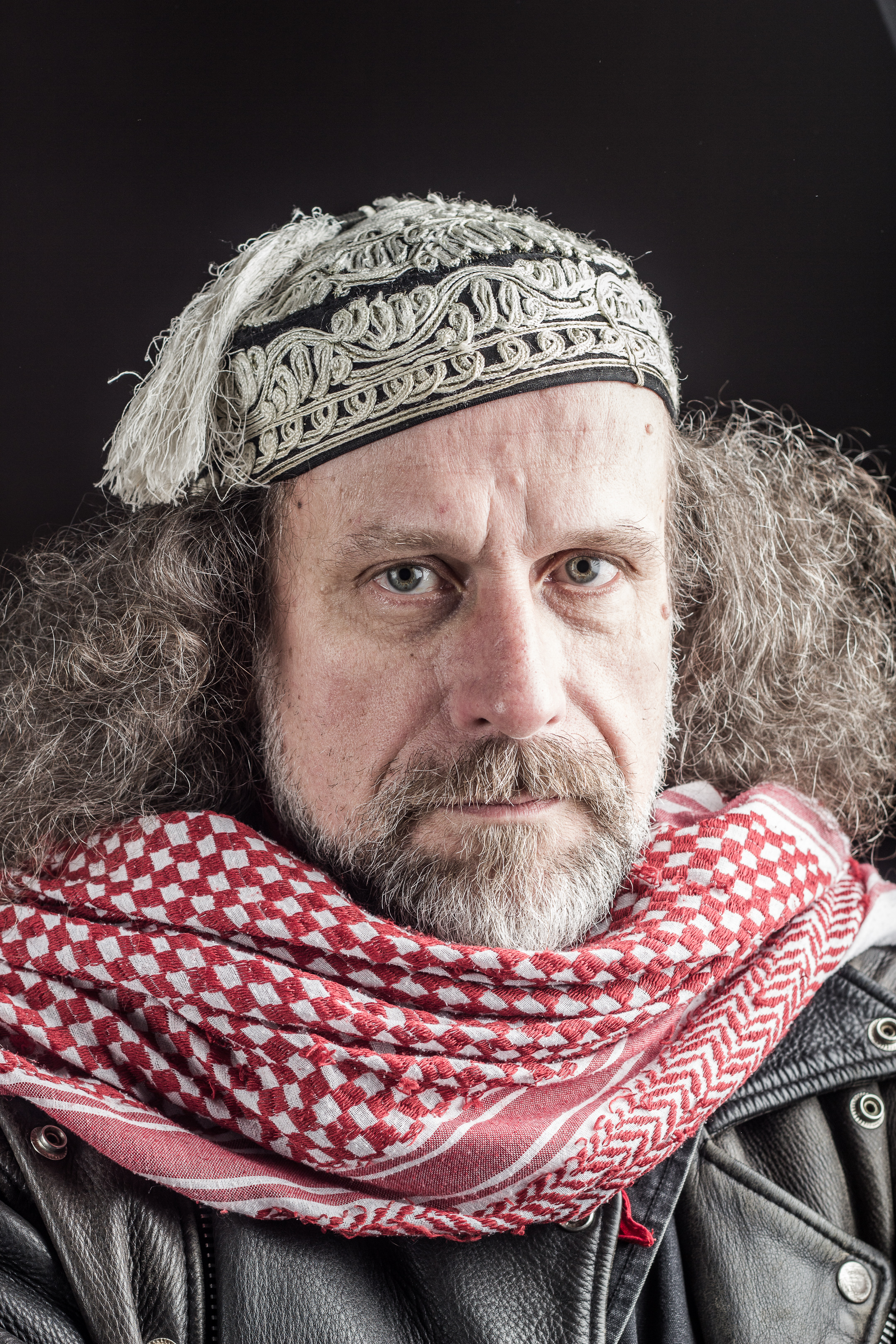
- Kohout in 2013
- Born: 1955; Plzeň, Czechoslovakia
- Known for: Performance art, writing, poetry, human rights activism

Milan Kohout (born 1955) is a Czech-American performance artist, writer, and university lecturer. He was a signatory of the Charter 77 human rights declaration against the communist government of Czechoslovakia.

== Early life ==
Kohout studied electrical engineering at the College of Mechanical and Electrical Engineering, Plzeň (now the University of West Bohemia). He was active in the Czech underground, as part of a movement known as the Second Culture. As a result of his political activities, he was forced to work in blue-collar occupations, such as several years working as a coal stoker at the Ethnographic Museum in Prague. In 1986 he was exiled from Czechoslovakia by the secret police, and spent two years in the Traiskirchen refugee camp in Austria.

== In the United States ==
He was granted political asylum in the United States, and moved to Boston, gaining a diploma from Tufts School of the Museum of Fine Arts in 1993. He has taught performance art as political action at Tufts School and at the Massachusetts College of Art and Design, and video production at the New England Institute of Art. During his years in Boston he created was engaged in experimental performance art, focused mainly on politics, human rights, and criticism of religious organizations and ideologies.

Between 1992 and 2003 he worked as a camera operator, video technician, and producer for news and public affairs cable TV channel C-SPAN. He has written a series of interviews for the Czech magazine Xantypa with subjects such as Noam Chomsky and Kurt Vonnegut Jr.

== Artwork and later career ==
Since 1994 he has been a member of the Mobius art group. He has participated in several international festivals and art programs (including festivals in China, Croatia, Poland, Taiwan, Cuba, Thailand, Israel, Canada, Mexico, and the United States). He has also lectured at the University of West Bohemia in Plzen.

Kohout's art criticises the US economy, religion, the media, the politics of oil, racism and social prejudice. His works include a performance art piece critical of the segregation wall in Ústí nad Labem, Czech Republic, where in 1999, as a protest against the segregation of Czech Roma, he cut the flag of the Czech Republic in half, and was subsequently accused of defaming the state symbol. In 2007 he was arrested in Boston after his performance "Nooses on Sale", which was critical of the conduct of US banks during the sub-prime mortgage crisis. The performance involved Kohout selling nooses outside a branch of the Bank of America, and after the bank reported him to the police, he was prosecuted for peddling goods without a licence. After a four-month trial he was found not guilty.

In 2011, he recorded a five-part autobiographical show for Czech Radio. He also appeared in the documentary film Radical Jesters, about political performance artists in the United States. In 2015 he appeared on the Czech TV show You Have the Word, arguing in favour of the Czech Republic accepting large numbers of refugees. Kohout described this as a political performance, but it sparked a negative reaction from the public and in the media.

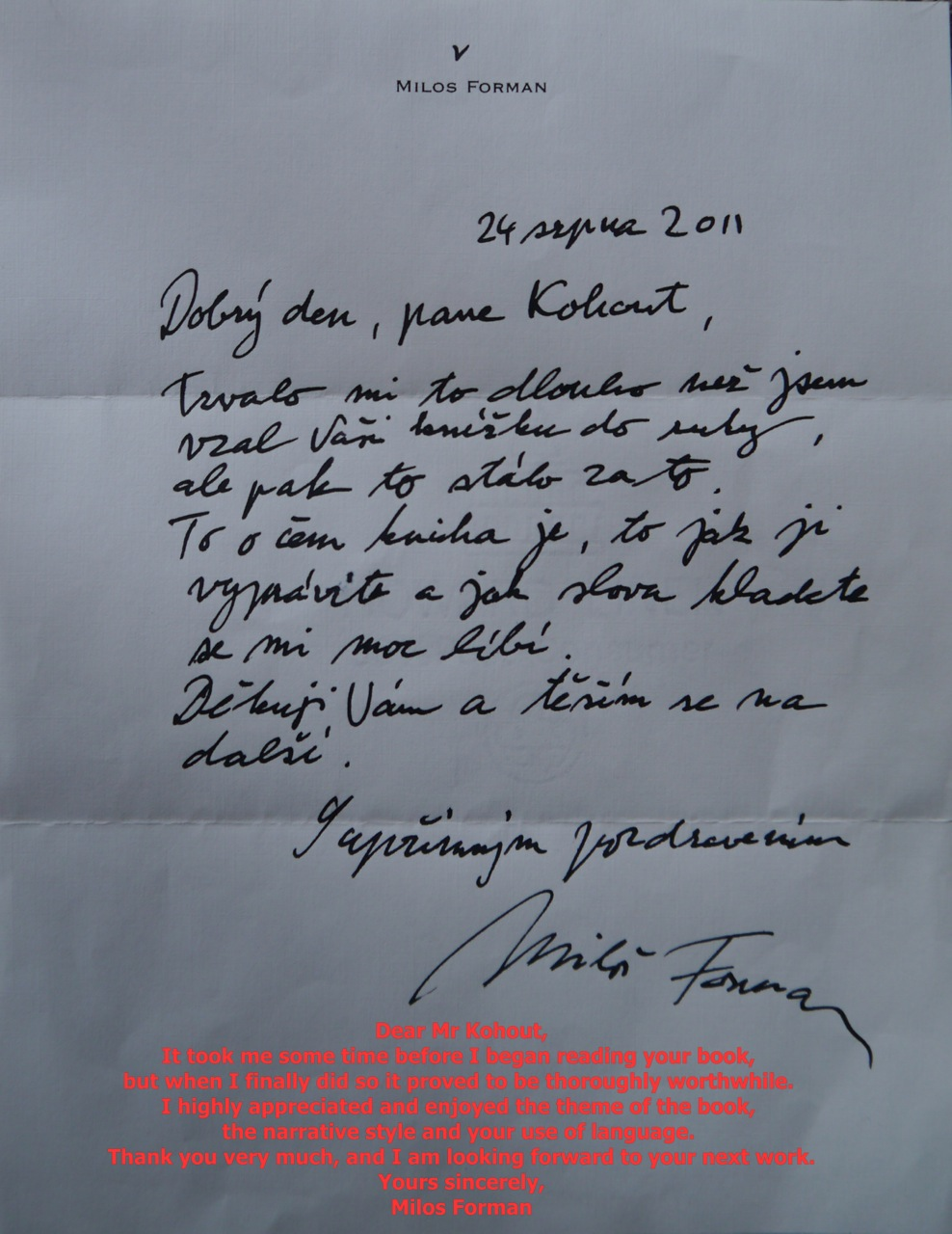
A letter by Miloš Forman to Milan Kohout in which he speaks highly of Kohout's book.

In September 2016 Kohout announced his candidacy for the 2018 Czech presidential elections, though in the event he did not start campaigning and was not a candidate in the election.

== Solo exhibitions in the Czech Republic ==
- 2009: A retrospective solo exhibition in NOD-Roxy Gallery in Prague.
- 2011: A retrospective solo exhibition at the Brno House of Arts (Gallery G99).
- 2012: Participation on the exhibition "Middle East Europe" at DOX in Prague.
- 2012: "Performance Art as Rebellious Art", Olomouc Museum of Art (April–May).
- 2013: Exhibition at the Art e FACTA Gallery Plzeň.
- 2013: Exhibition "Where Is My Home?", DOX Centre for Contemporary Art, Prague, Czech Republic.
- 2015: Exhibition from a cycle "Test Exposure", Wrocław Art Center in Poland.

== Publications ==
- Lead the Ox via world, Ox Remains, Petr Štengl Publishing, November 2010, ISBN 978-80-904455-4-3
- Spatial Relations Speak the Language of Social Hierarchy,
- Performance as the Eternal Performer, University of Ostrava, 2014
- Rage, JT’s Publishing, 2018, ISBN 978-80-905633-5-3

== Gallery ==
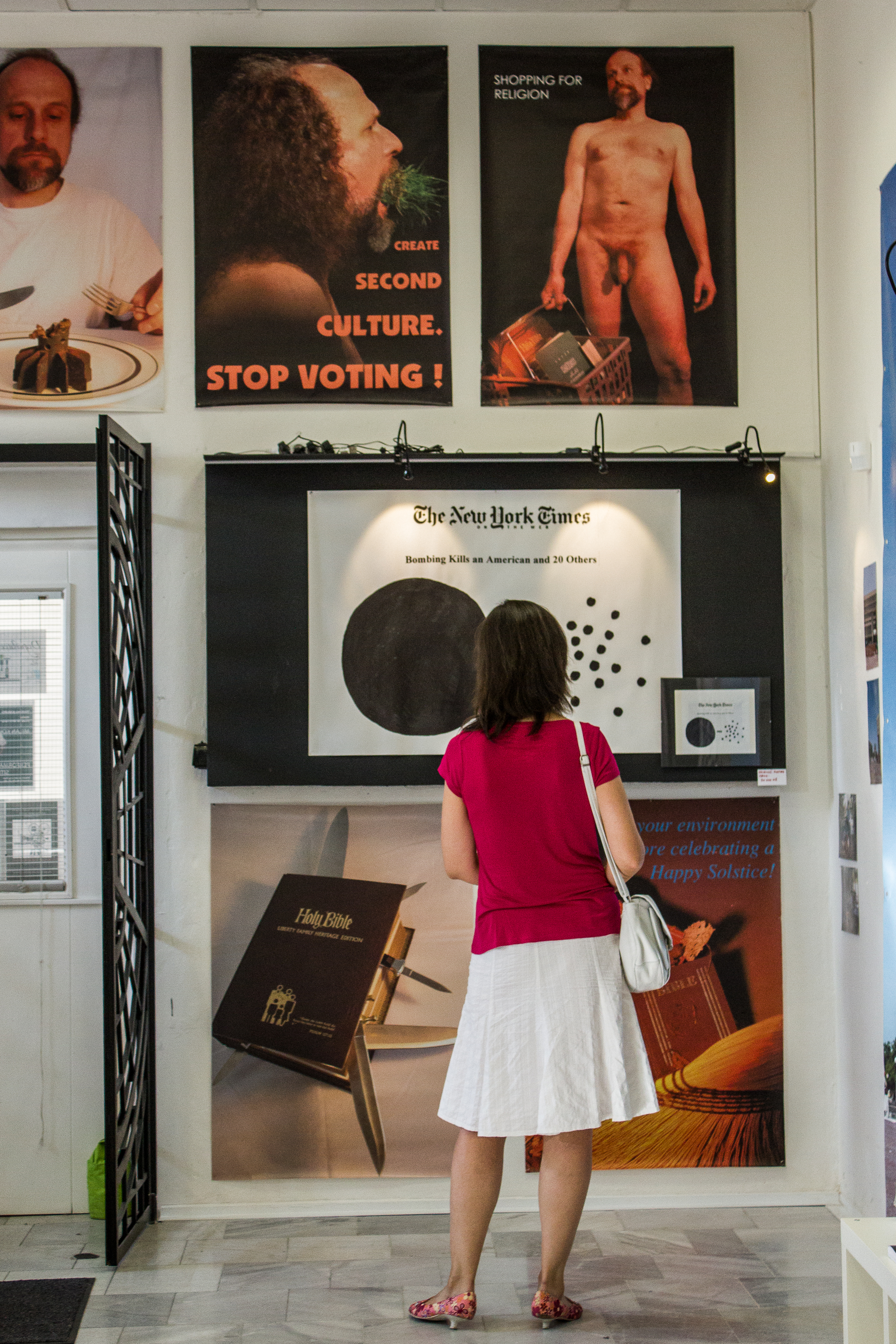
Part of the exhibition of works by Milan Kohout in Plzeň 2013

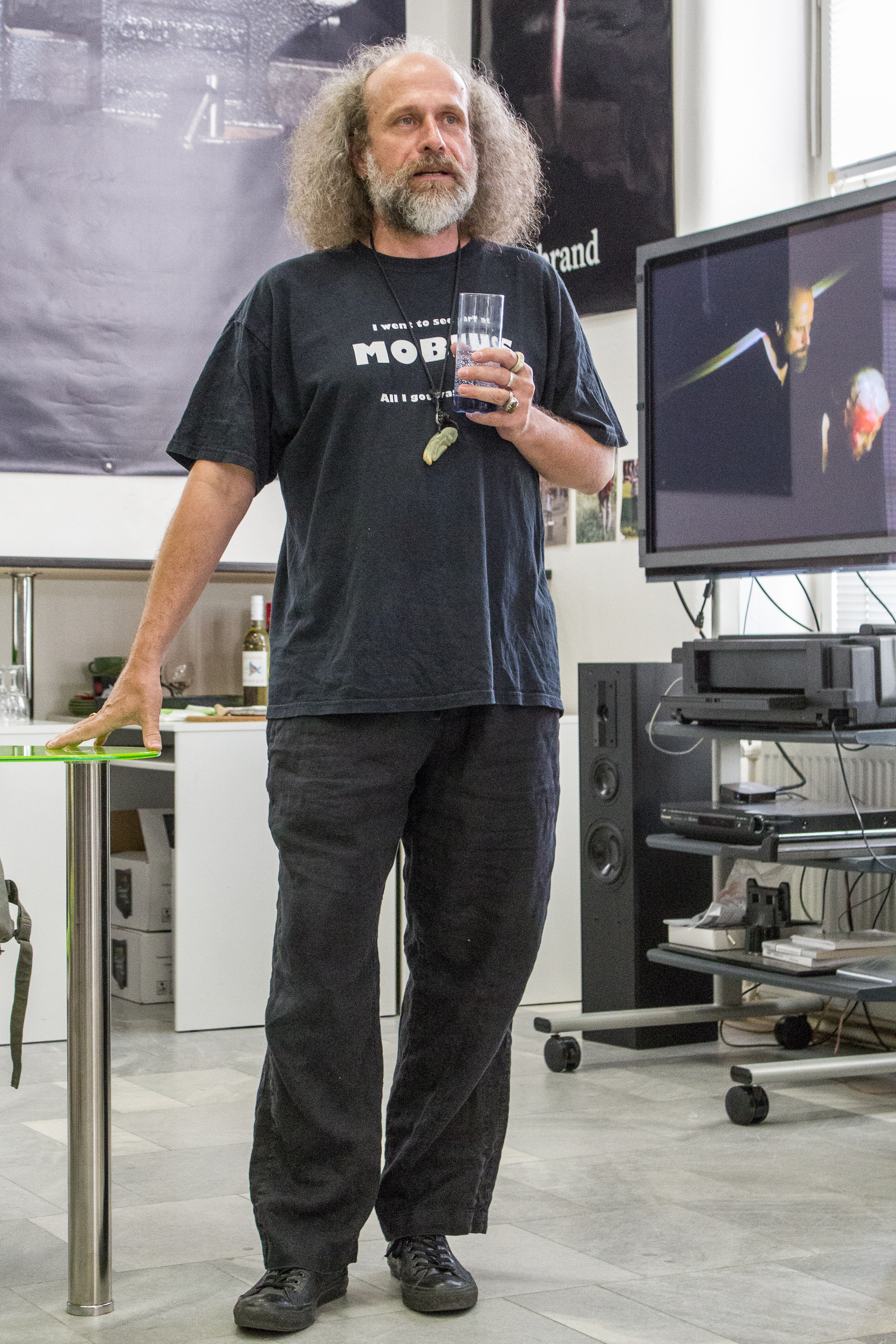
Milan Kohout

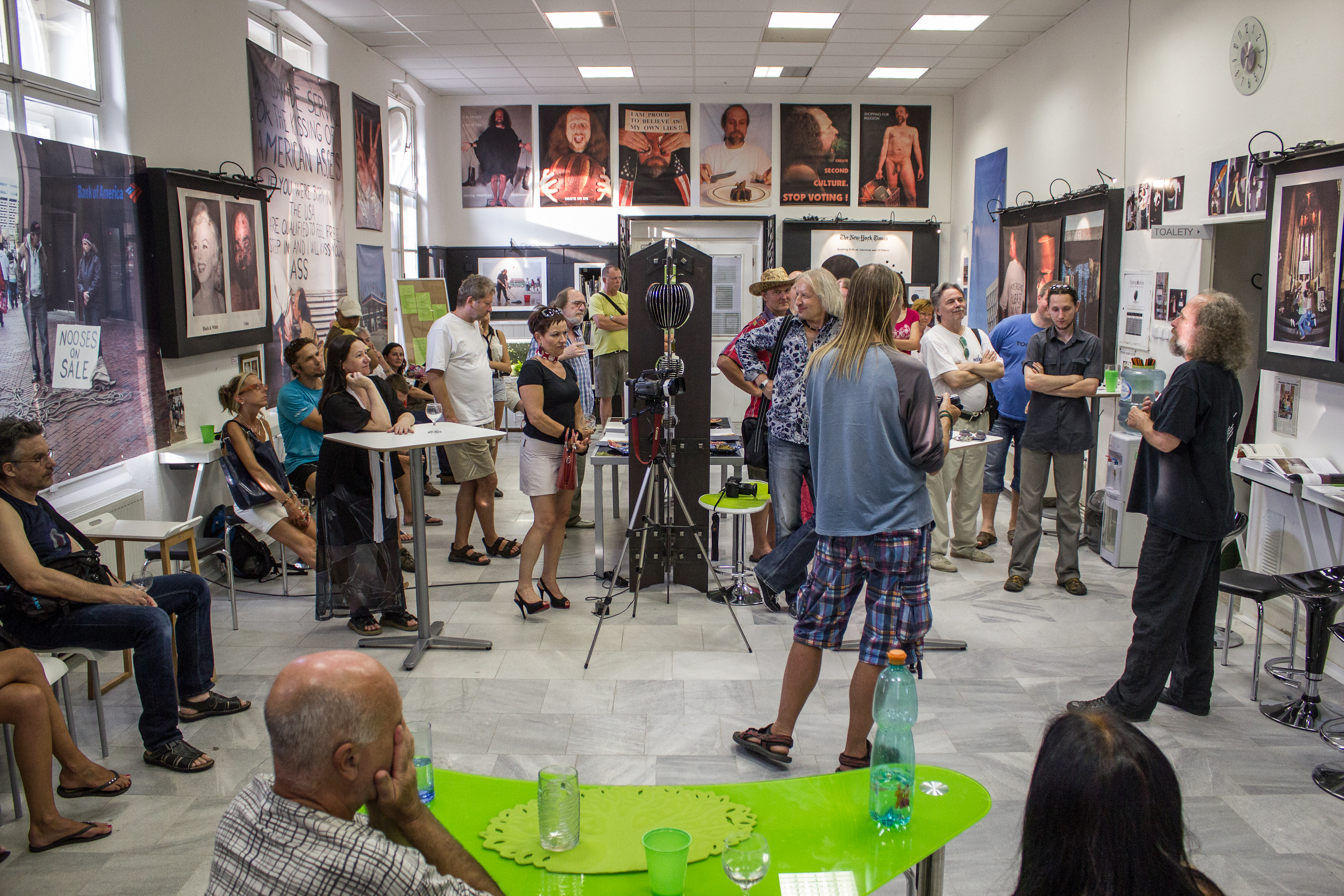
In Plzeň Art Gallery e Facta with visitors to the exhibition, August 2013

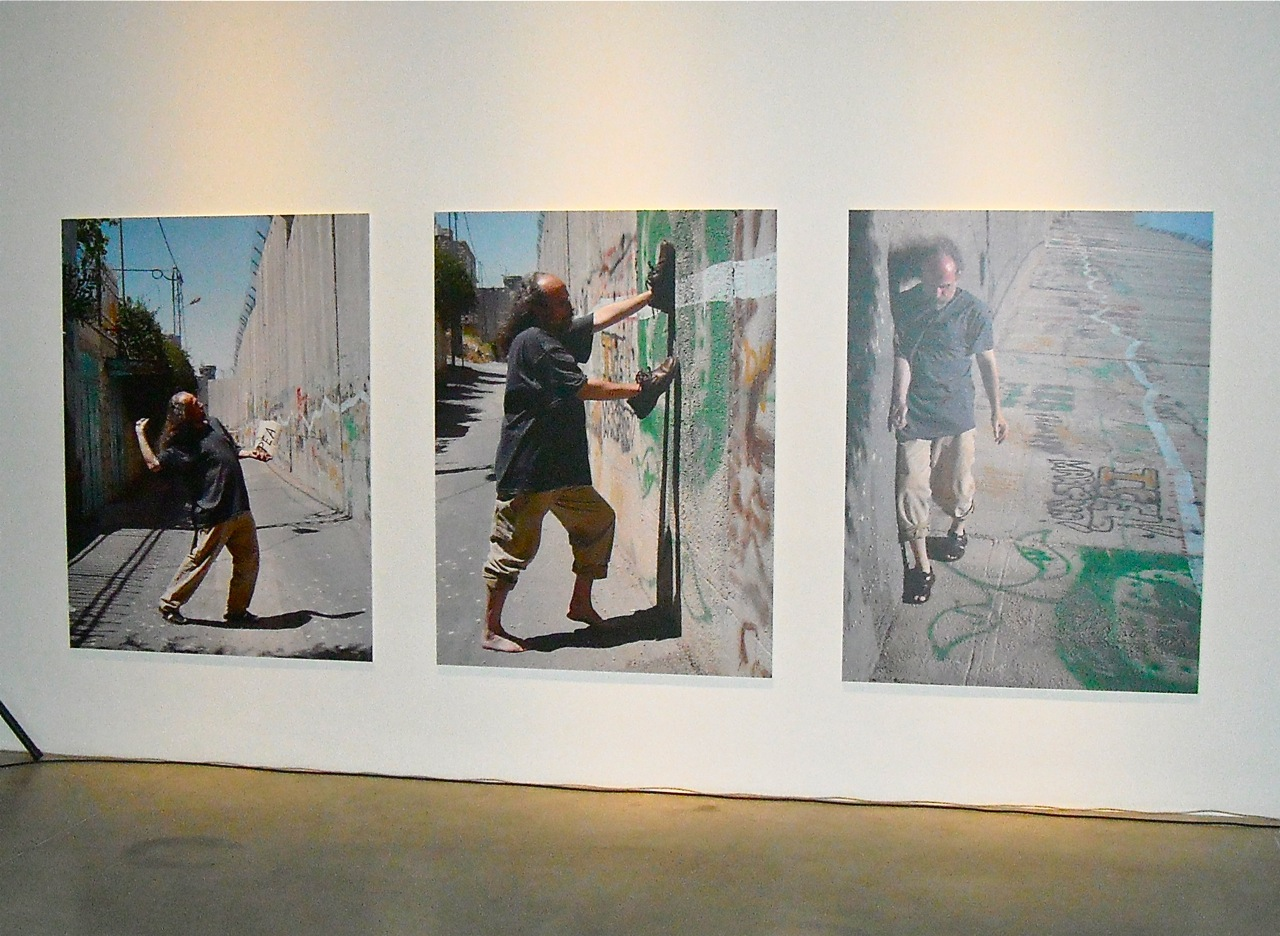
Milan Kohout "Triptych" in Prague Dox (http://www.dox.cz/en/), 2012

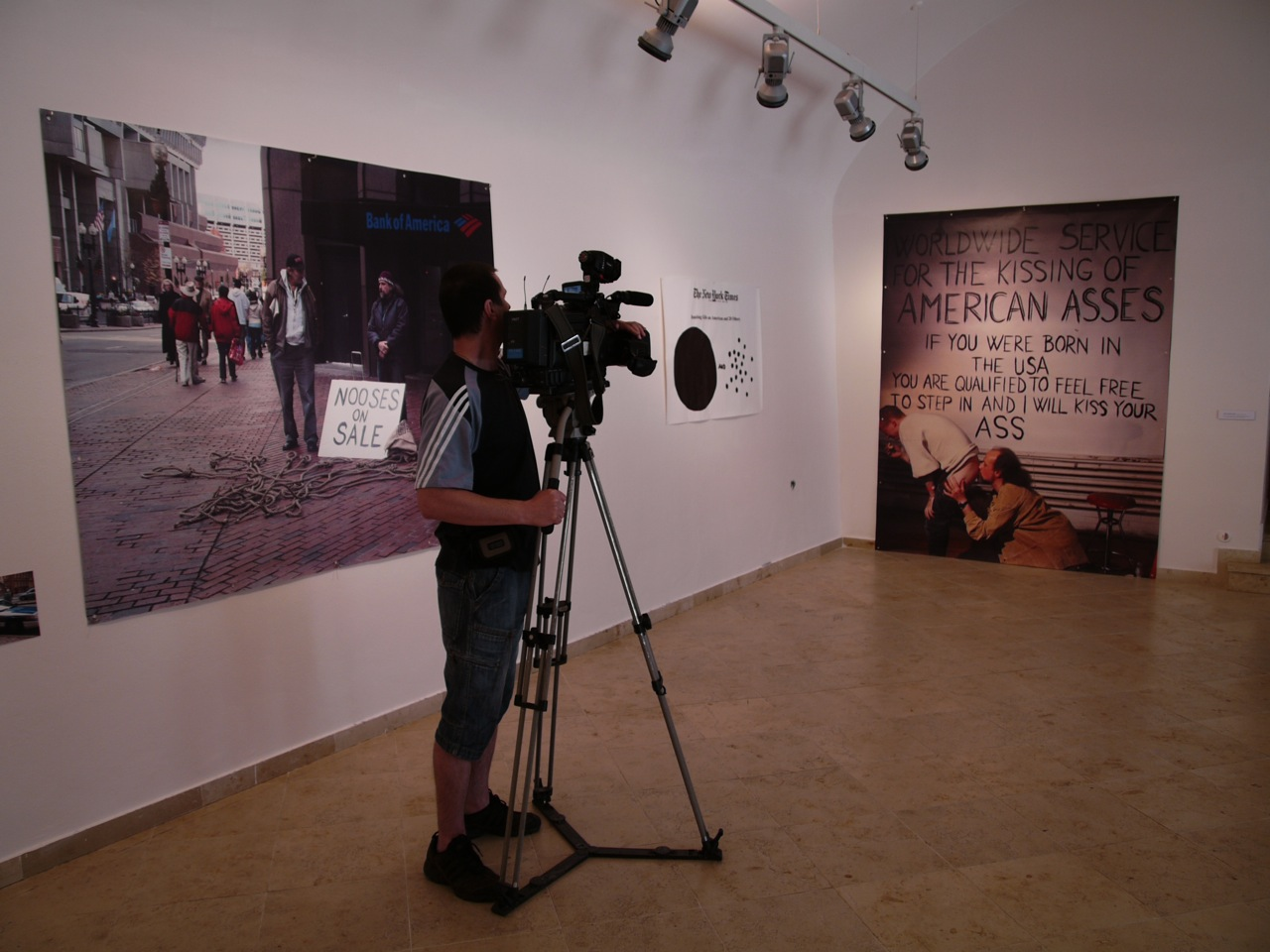
Milan Kohout exhibition at the House of Art in Brno 2011
