= Toman Brod =

Czech historian (1929–2026)

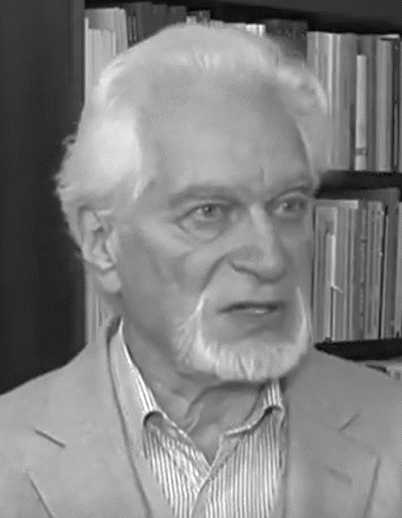
- Born: 18 January 1929; Prague, Czechoslovakia
- Died: 23 May 2026 (aged 97)
- Occupation: Historian
- Spouse: Libuše Kvasničková
- Writing career
- Genres: Non-fiction, history

Toman Brod (18 January 1929 – 23 May 2026) was a Czech historian, Holocaust survivor, and member of the Communist Party turned anti-communist dissident.

== Biography ==
Brod was born in Prague on 18 January 1929 to an assimilated Jewish family, who lived in an apartment near the Vltava river. Before World War II, Brod considered himself to be Czech, but following the Munich Agreement and the Nuremberg Laws, he felt like he did not belong anywhere. As it became more difficult for Jewish citizens to do everyday activities, the Brods received help from their longtime cook, Anna Kopská, and some other Christians.

=== During the Holocaust ===
On 27 July 1942 Brod was deported to Terezín along with his brother and mother. Brod lived in one of the boys' dormitories and attended school classes, in which the teachers attempted to protect the children from the reality of life in the ghetto. Brod and his brother were able to visit their mother most afternoons. Kopská sent care packages to the family while they were in Terezín. In 1943, Brod was deported to Auschwitz, where he was assigned to a children's bunk in the Family Camp. The liquidation of the family camp was scheduled for June, six months after their arrival. The boys were sentenced to die, but Josef Mengele selected some of the boys for work, including Brod. He subsequently escaped Auschwitz by sneaking onto a transport with his friends to the Gross-Rosen Camp.

=== Life after World War II ===
After the liberation of the concentration camps, Brod returned to Prague, the only member of his family to survive the Holocaust, and lived with Anna Kopská. He then went on to study at university, and graduated with a degree in history. He joined the Communist Party in 1948. While at university, Brod met his future wife, Libuše Kvasničková. After marrying, they continued to live with Kopská. In 1955, Brod got a job at the Military History Institute, during which time he became disillusioned with the Communist Party and attempted to subvert it, conducting independent research into the activities of the Czechoslovak resistance during World War II, which resulted in him experiencing trouble with the government. He was eventually expelled from the Party and fired from his job, after which he worked as a water pumper, which was a miserable experience for him. He eventually received disability status and was able to live at home. During this time, a friend asked him to sign Charter 77, which he did, as one of the 150 original signatories of the charter. Brod and his wife spoke openly of their anti-Soviet views and participated in many political demonstrations, despite their apartment being wired by the StB. Around this time Brod began to share his story; his daughter married a Jewish man from the United States, which caused her to be more interested in her father's past, pressuring him to write down his memories. He also began taking others to visit Terezín.

Brod died on 23 May 2026, at the age of 97.

== Historical works ==
Brod resumed writing historical essays after the end of the communist regime in Prague. He wrote a book about his life called Ještě že člověk neví, co ho čeká ("A man never knows what's coming"). He spoke frequently about the Holocaust, and was interviewed by organisations including Centropa and Post Bellum. A documentary film was made by students about his life and experiences.

=== Works ===
| Year of publishing | Title | Genre |
|---|---|---|
| 1961 | Pražské květnové povstání 1945 | Non-fiction, textbook |
| 1965 | Na západnom fronte | Non-fiction, history |
| 1965 | Nastal čas boje | Non-fiction, History |
| 1990 | Operace Velký podvod | Non-fiction, history |
| 1990 | Pakty Stalina s Hitlerem | Literature didactic |
| 1991 | Triumf a zkáza | Non-fiction, history |
| 2002 | Osudný omyl Edvarda Beneše 1939 - 1948 | Non-fiction, history |
| 2007 (German version in 2012) | Ještě že člověk neví, co ho čeká | Non-fiction, biography |
| 2008 (first edition in 1961) | Tobrucké krysy | Literature didactic |
