= Vladimír Škutina =

Czech writer, playwright, journalist, screenwriter, and television producer

Vladimír Škutina (16 January 1931 – 20 August 1995) was a Czech writer, playwright, journalist, screenwriter and television producer. He was a leading television reporter for the events of the 1968 Prague Spring, and is closely associated with that event in the minds of the Czech public. His use of political satire led to his arrest and imprisonment from 1962 through 1963, and again from 1969 through 1974. His signing of Charter 77, a document describing human rights abuses by the Czech government, led to further disfavor with the government which resulted in his exile in Switzerland from 1974 until the early 1990s when he returned to live in Prague.

== Life and career ==
Vladimír Škutina was born in Prague on 16 January 1931. Škutina earned degrees in drama and psychology from Charles University. He then studied drama at the Film and TV School of the Academy of Performing Arts in Prague. In 1953 he began working as a scriptwriter and producer for Czech television for both entertainment and news programs. He began working as a television journalist. Not afraid to use political satire in his broadcasts, he was arrested and imprisoned in 1962–1963 for dishonoring First Secretary of the Communist Party of Czechoslovakia, Antonín Novotný. This experience was the muse for a later 1979 novel penned by Škutina entitled Presidentův vězeň (en: The President's Prisoner).

After his release, Škutina returned to television and enjoyed a period of high popularity as a Czech television journalist for the remainder of the 1960s until he was arrested again in 1969. He had been a leading television reporter for the events of the 1968 Prague Spring, and is closely associated with that event in the minds of the Czech public. Škutina's penchant for needling political figures and others who wielded power through satire drew the ire of the courts, and after two lengthy court trials he was sentenced to a four-year prison term with an additional three-year ban after his release from involvement in television and other media. He was released early from prison in the Spring of 1974 after a successful appeal was made by the British National Union of Journalists. Following his release, he became one of the first signatories of Charter 77 which documented human rights abuses made by the Czechoslovak government. His action increased his disfavor with the government and he was forced to leave Czechoslovakia; living in Switzerland in exile.

In Switzerland, Škutina continued to work as a journalist with Radio Free Europe and the Voice of America, and served as editor-in-chief of Reporter magazine. In 1979 he co-authored the article Anekdota za Pendrek with Ota Filip in Konfrontation which attacked the Czech government and politicians with acerbic wit. He also penned three books. On 23 October 1985 he gave a speech at Arizona State University entitled "Humor as a Weapon Against Totalitarianism" in which he stated

In Czechoslovakia a citizen is guaranteed the freedom of speech. In the United States, however, a person is guaranteed freedom even after he speaks.

In 1988, Škutina received the Mark Twain Award for humor (not the Kennedy Center prize of the same name), and in 1990 the Peace Prize of the American Universities for his essay "What's humour for, once we have freedom?". One of his final publications was a book on Czechoslovak diplomat František Schwarzenberg (Český šlechtic František Schwarzenberg, Prague: Rozmluvy, 1990). He returned to his native country after the Velvet Revolution and he died of cancer in Prague on 20 August 1995 at the age of 64.
