= Jiří Wolf =

Czech political prisoner (1952–2026)

Jiří Wolf (5 January 1952 – 16 June 2026) was a Czech political prisoner and anticommunist activist who was a signatory of Charter 77. He was also an author of storybooks, and radical opponent and critic of the "nobility of the Charter", which, in his opinion, includes Václav Havel and several other persons close to the former Czech president.

== Biography ==
Wolf was for the first time arrested on 16 February 1978 after the police found "subversive, anti-Party, and anti-socialist documents" during a house search. As result, he was sentenced to three years in prison for subversion. After Wolf claimed that his confession had been forced by physical and psychological pressure, he was prosecuted for false accusation and his punishment was increased by another six months in prison. Wolf then spent more than half a year in isolation or in a special ward in the prison in Minkovice, during which period he lost about twenty kilograms in weight. Due to his failure to meet working standards, Wolf also spent part of the sentence in the prison in Valdice under the strictest supervision.

According to the testimony of Wolf's former inmate in Minkovice, he manifested himself as a passionate supporter of the freedom of thought and protection of human rights immediately after he had entered the prison. After he rejected any cooperation, the prison management assigned him to the hardest workplace in the prison. Wolf was unable to meet the required working standards there and also suffered several attacks by violent recidivists. Further escalation of disciplinary sanctions resulted in the transfer to a special ward with the harshest conditions. Wolf was held there for three months. Despite all, Wolf remained a fanatical debater defending his truth. The following stream of disciplinary punishments for "refusing to work", often for trumped-up reasons, resulted in him becoming rather withdrawn toward the end of his sentence.

He was arrested for the second time on 17 May 1983 for passing information about conditions in Czech prisons to the Austrian Embassy in Prague. He was sentenced to another six years in prison for subversion in cooperation with foreign agents, which was followed by three years of protective supervision. He was again placed in Valdice, where his health worsened considerably; he suffered from chest pain and deterioration of vision. Appeals by international organizations eventually led to small improvements in his treatment.

In 1984, Amnesty International declared him a Prisoner of Conscience. AIUSA campus groups on the San Francisco peninsula took up his case and, with Congressman Tom Lantos and his wife Annette, campaigned for his release, winning extensive news coverage and high level support. Jiri was released at the end of his prison term. On the same day, dissident Václav Havel was also released from jail.

In 1990, Wolf was invited to the United States, where he presented his case as an example of efficient work by the Amnesty International. He spoke at AIUSA's annual general meeting, held that year in Boston. He also toured the Nashua Street Jail, newly opened after courts deemed the Charles Street Jail unfit, to view prison conditions in America.

After his release from prison, Wolf was treated both by Czech and American doctors. However, Wolf still suffered from chronic fatigue syndrome.

Wolf called for support of political prisoners in undemocratic regimes.

Wolf died on 16 June 2026, at the age of 74.

== Literature ==
- Jiří Wolf, Stuart Rawlings: Good soldier Wolf: one man's struggle for freedom in Czechoslovakia, Lanham; New York; London: University Press of America, 1994, ISBN 0-8191-9388-7
