= Petruška Šustrová =

Czech publicist and translator (1947–2023)

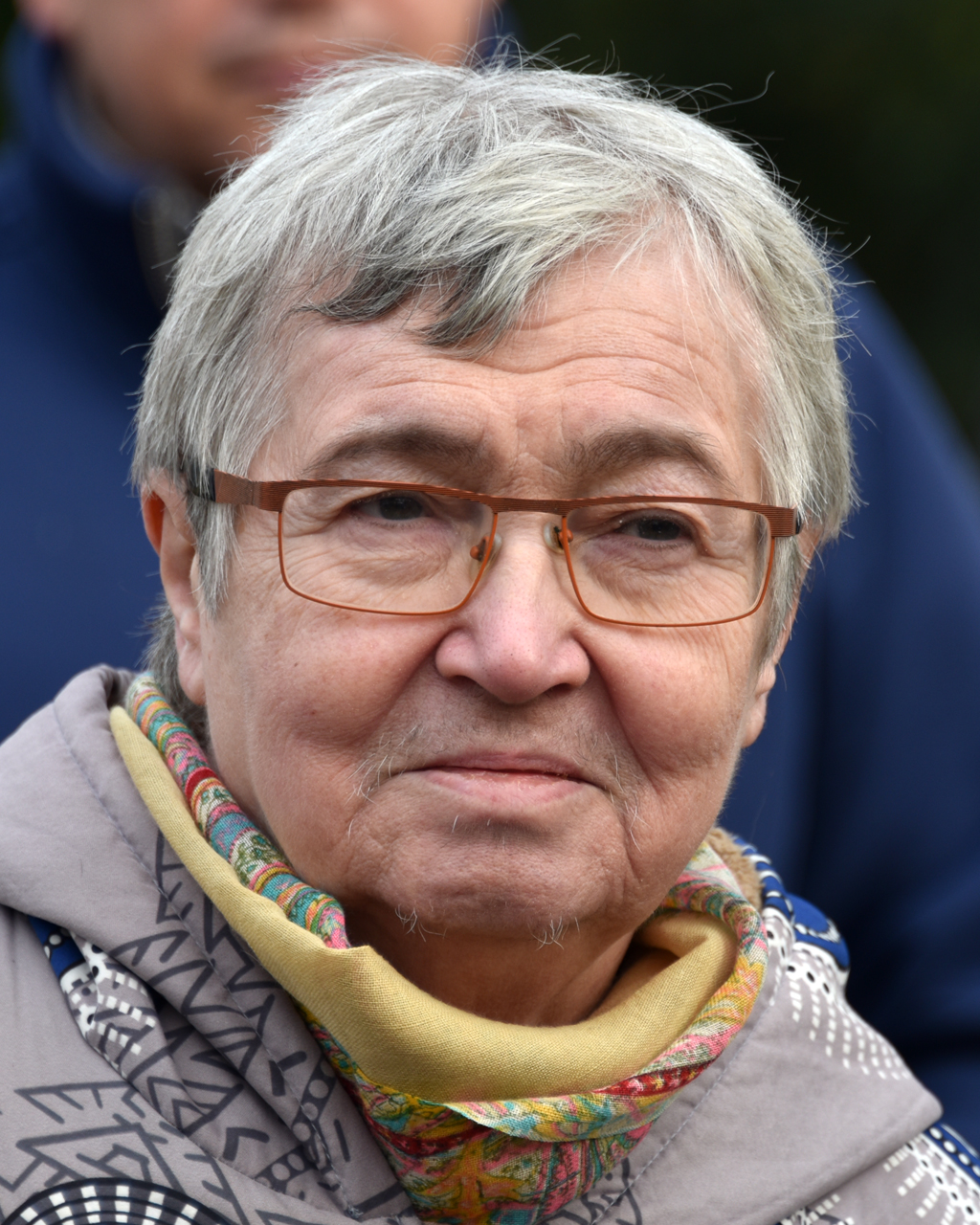
- Sustrova in 2020
- Born: 18 May 1947; Prague
- Died: 6 May 2023 (aged 75)
- Occupation: Translator, journalist, politician, opinion writer
- Spouse(s): Vavřinec Korčiš, Jaroslav Kukal
- Children: Štěpán Korčiš, Ivan Hrůša
- Awards: 1st of June Award (2006); participant in the resistance and resistance against communism
- Position held: spokesperson of Charter 77 (1985–1986)

Petruška Šustrová (18 May 1947 – 6 May 2023) was a Czech dissident, journalist, and translator. She was a signatory of Charter 77. She was an international observer for elections in Georgia, Azerbaijan's and Belarus, and was awarded the Officer’s Merit Cross from the Republic of Poland. She also received the Karel Havlíček Borovský Prize for Journalism.

== Early life and education ==
Šustrová was born on 18 May 1947 in Prague. She was a student of Czech history and literature at the Faculty of Arts, Charles University, Prague in 1968 when the Warsaw Pact invasion of Czechoslavakia happened.

== Later life ==
Šustrová joined the university strike, and then was one of the founders of the Revolutionary Youth Movement (Hnutí revoluční mládže). In December 1969 she was arrested for revolutionary activities and spent two years in jail. After her release in 1971 she worked at a post office. She later worked as a cleaner, before not being allowed to work.

Šustrová was a signatory of Charter 77. She was a founder of the Committee for the Defense of the Unjustly Prosecuted. Šustrová was an international observer for the elections in Georgia, Azerbaijan and Belarus between 1999 and 2004.

In 1999 Šustrová received the Karel Havlíček Borovský Prize for Journalism from the Czech Literary Fund.

In 2004 she was awarded the Officer’s Merit Cross from the Republic of Poland (Krzyż Oficerski Orderu Zasługi Rzeczypospolitej Polskiej), which was presented by President Aleksander Kwaśniewski.

Šustrová died on 6 May 2023, at the age of 75. Some of her papers are archived at the Online Archive of California.
