= Vladimír Klokočka =

Czech lawyer, legal expert and politician

Vladimír Klokočka (23 April 1929 – 19 October 2009) was a Czech lawyer, legal expert and politician. He was a signatory to the Charter 77 manifesto, which criticized the Czechoslovak Communist government for not implementing basic human rights provisions.

Born in Prague in 1929, Klokočka graduated from the Faculty of Law at Charles University in Prague. He worked as a lecturer following his graduation from Charles University.

In the spring of 1968, Klokočka became a deputy in the Czech National Council, the Czech lower house within Czechoslovakia during the height of the Prague Spring reform period. He also became the dean of the Faculty of Law in Brno, where he drafted new election laws for Czechoslovakia. However, in August 1968 Soviet and other Warsaw Pact forces invaded Czechoslovakia and crushed the liberalization movement. Klokočka was removed from public office and his academic positions at the university.

Klokočka took a job with an insurance company following his removal. However, he was fired from the company once he joined with other Czechoslovak professionals and dissidents to sign the Charter 77 manifesto. Under threat of political persecution, Klokočka fled the country and settled in exile in Munich, West Germany. He was able to obtain a position on the faculty of the Ludwig-Maximilians-Universität München (LMU).

He returned from exile to Czechoslovakia in 1990, following the collapse of the Communist Czechoslovak government in November 1989 during the Velvet Revolution. Following the dissolution of Czechoslovakia, Klokočka worked for the Constitutional Court for ten years, from 1993 until 2003. The focus of much of his work dealt with resolving disputes between Czech political parties and election legislation. Klokočka wrote a number of books and articles after his departure from the Constitutional Court in 1993. He received an honorary doctorate from Masaryk University.

Vladimír Klokočka died on 19 October 2009 at the age of 80.
