= Vladimír Príkazský =

Czech politician (1935–2021)

Vladímir Príkazský

Minister without Portfolio
- In office 13 February 1990 – 27 June 1990

Personal details
- Born: 30 June 1935 Prague, Czechoslovakia
- Died: 12 May 2021 (aged 85)
- Party: KSČ; OF

Vladímir Príkazský (30 June 1935 – 12 May 2021) was a Czech politician and journalist. He was a signatory of Charter 77.

== Biography ==
Born in Prague, Príkazský graduated from grammar school in Skalica. He was unable to study humanities in university due to his relation to Vladimír Clementis, and therefore studied engineering, completed his military service, and trained as a miner. He became a journalist for Czechoslovak Radio, where he was part of the editorial office on children's broadcasting. Subsequently, he graduated from the Faculty of Social Sciences, Charles University in Prague. As a journalist, he covered the death of Jan Palach.

Príkazský was a member of the Communist Party of Czechoslovakia, but was expelled from the party and forced to leave his profession as a journalist. He was a signatory of Charter 77 and drove construction machinery for the state fishery company. In the 1970s and 80s, he was executive director of Charter 77.

Príkazský returned to public life following the Velvet Revolution. He became director of the Lidové noviny publishing house in January 1990. On 13 February 1990, he was appointed Minister without Portfolio in the Marián Čalfa government and held the position until Čalfa's term ended on 27 June 1990.

Vladímir Príkazský died on 12 May 2021 at the age of 85.
