= Vladimír Hučín =

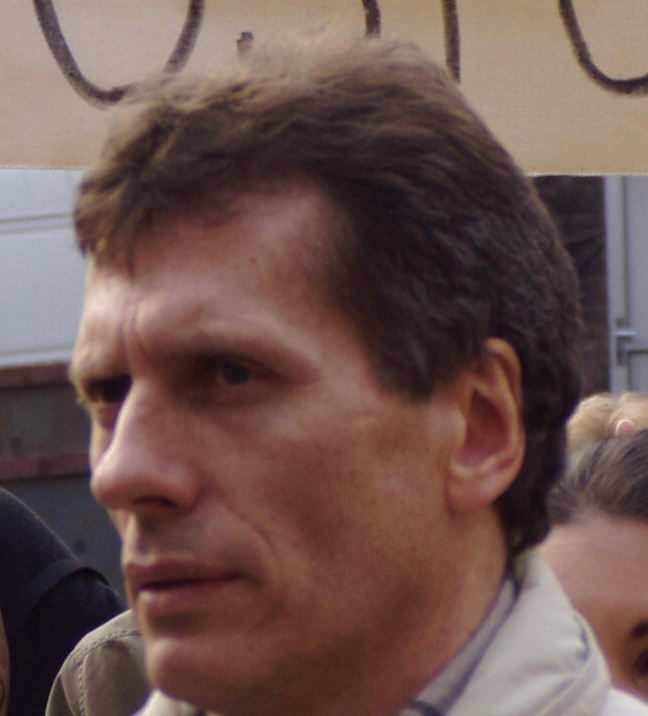
Vladimír Hučín

Vladimír Hučín (25 May 1952 in Gottwaldov) is a Czech political celebrity and dissident of both communist and post/communist era.

In the 1970s and 1980s he used explosives to destroy various propaganda symbols of communism and distributed anti-communist leaflets; he got caught and was tried four times, received various forms of punishment including imprisonment; he served a grand total of 40 months in prison. After his release from prison in 1987 he signed the Charter 77 proclamation. Even when he wasn't imprisoned he suffered extensive discrimination from the Czech communist authorities and their Secret Police (StB). He was eventually rehabilitated of all the communist era convictions and they were rendered null and void.

After the so-called Velvet Revolution of 1989 he worked in the Civic Commissions (these were administering clearances to the members of the ordinary Police force) and later was nominated by the Confederation of Political Prisoners to work at the Security Information Service (BIS), a Czech intelligence agency and once admitted there, he achieved a rank of Captain and was regarded as one of its best officers.

In 2001, when he came to the conclusion that an ultra-left wingers of the Communist Party of Bohemia and Moravia were behind several unsolved explosions that took place in his home town of Přerov (of which he is an honorary citizen), he was fired from BIS and soon after that arrested and imprisoned on 7 unsubstantiated charges. He was held in custody only few days short of a year and spent a portion of that time in a psychiatric hospital. In spite of numerous requests the then-president Václav Havel refused to look into the matter and grant him clemency, even though Havel was well known for his extensive use of clemency while in office. On the other hand, in 2001 Havel pardoned Hučín's mother, accused of illegal possession of firearms. Similarly several petitions with thousands of signatures to the Czech Senate went unheeded.

Hučín's trial ran for five years without public being admitted into the court room (on pretense that the court was dealing with classified materials) and on one occasion even being ejected by a brutal force from the court house. In November 2005 he was acquitted of all charges, an appellate court confirmed the verdict on 21 April 2006 in Olomouc. During those 5 years, while out of the custody, he could not find any work because prospective employers feared the persecution by the authorities. After he was acquitted, there was no compensation or even an apology coming to Vladimir Hučín from the Czech Republic or BIS for his wrongful imprisonment. Any documents related to his case are effectively closed to the public (as well as to himself) and even Parliamentary Security Commission was not allowed to see them by the BIS.

Vladimír Hučín tried (unsuccessfully) for a seat in the Senate in 2006 and again in 2008.

Through his website and through the interviews with the media Vladimír Hučín continues to point out the persons he deems unfit for their public office.

He co-authored two books which describe his ordeal, "Není to o mně ale o nás" (It's about us, not about me) and "Hrdinům se neděkuje" (Heroes don't receive thanks); especially the first one is a plentiful source of information about him and his work.

A short documentary film called "Pravdě podobný příběh Vladimíra Hučína" (Truth-like story of Vladimir Hučín) which describes Hučín's post-comminst era ordeal has been made by Martin Vadas.

Czech Senator Jaromír Štětina dedicated one chapter of his book "Brutalita moci" (Brutality of Power) to the case of Vladimir Hučín; in it he extensively describes not only the Hučín's case but also how the Parliamentary Security Commission was treated by the BIS.
