= Dana Němcová =

Czech politician and psychologist (1934–2023)

- Danuška Valtrová
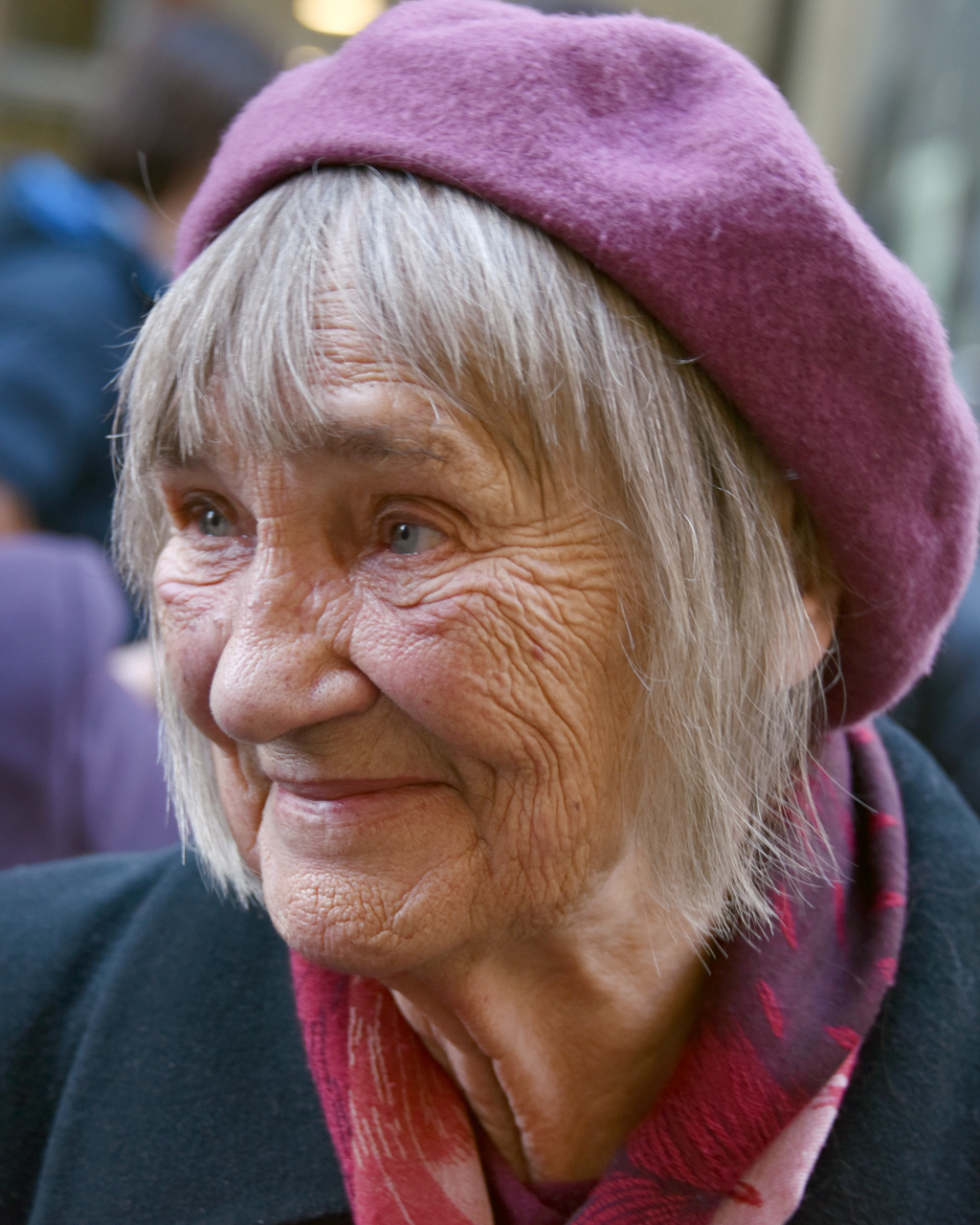

Member of the Chamber of the Nations of Czechoslovakia
- In office 30 January 1990 – 5 June 1990

Member of the Chamber of the People of Czechoslovakia
- In office 7 June 1990 – 4 June 1992

Personal details
- Born: 14 January 1934 Most, Czechoslovakia
- Died: 11 April 2023 (aged 89)
- Spouse: Jiří Němec (m. 1955; died 2001)

Dana Němcová (14 January 1934 – 11 April 2023) was a Czech psychologist and dissident. She was one of the first signatories of Charter 77 and a co-founder of the Committee for the Defense of the Unjustly Prosecuted (VONS).

== Honours ==
- Medal of Merit, I Class (1998)
- Order of Tomáš Garrigue Masaryk, II Class (2025)
