= Jan Trefulka =

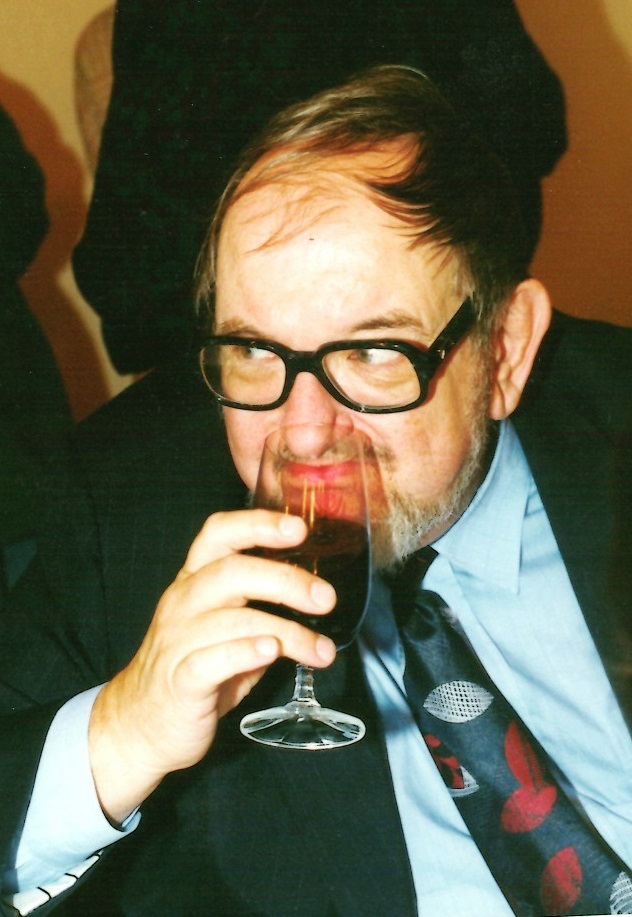
- Born: 15 May 1929; Brno, Czechoslovakia
- Died: 22 November 2012 (aged 83); Brno, Czech Republic
- Occupation: Writer

Jan Trefulka (15 May 1929 – 22 November 2012) was a Czech writer, translator, literary critic and publicist.

== Biography ==
Trefulka was born in Brno, Czechoslovakia, where he also died. He attended school with Milan Kundera and the pair remained lifelong friends.

Critical of the communist regime, in 1950 he was expelled from the Communist Party of Czechoslovakia for "anti-party activities" along with Kundera. At the same time he was expelled from Charles University in Prague where he was studying literature and aesthetics. Trefulka wrote about his run-in with the communist party in his first novella Pršelo jim štestí (Happiness Rained on Them, 1962). Trefulka was involved with Samizdat – the publishing and distributing of censored literature under communist rule, and was a signatory of Charter 77.

Trefulka found it difficult to find work in the country after the Soviet invasion of Czechoslovakia in 1968. He spent time unemployed and working as a manual labourer.

After the Velvet Revolution and the downfall of the communist regime in 1989, he became more active in public life, becoming president of the Association of Moravian-Silesian Writers and a member of the first Czech Television Council.

== List of works ==
- Happiness Rained on Them (Pršelo jim štěstí) (1962)
- Praise Only for the Fools (O bláznech jen dobré) (1973)
- The Criminal Uprising (Zločin pozdvižen) (1978)
- Seduced and Betrayed (Svedený a opuštěný) (1983)
- A Fool's Reader (Bláznova čítanka) (1998) A collection of Trefulka's work published in Samizdat.
