= Jiří Hájek =

Czech politician and diplomat

Professor Jiří Hájek
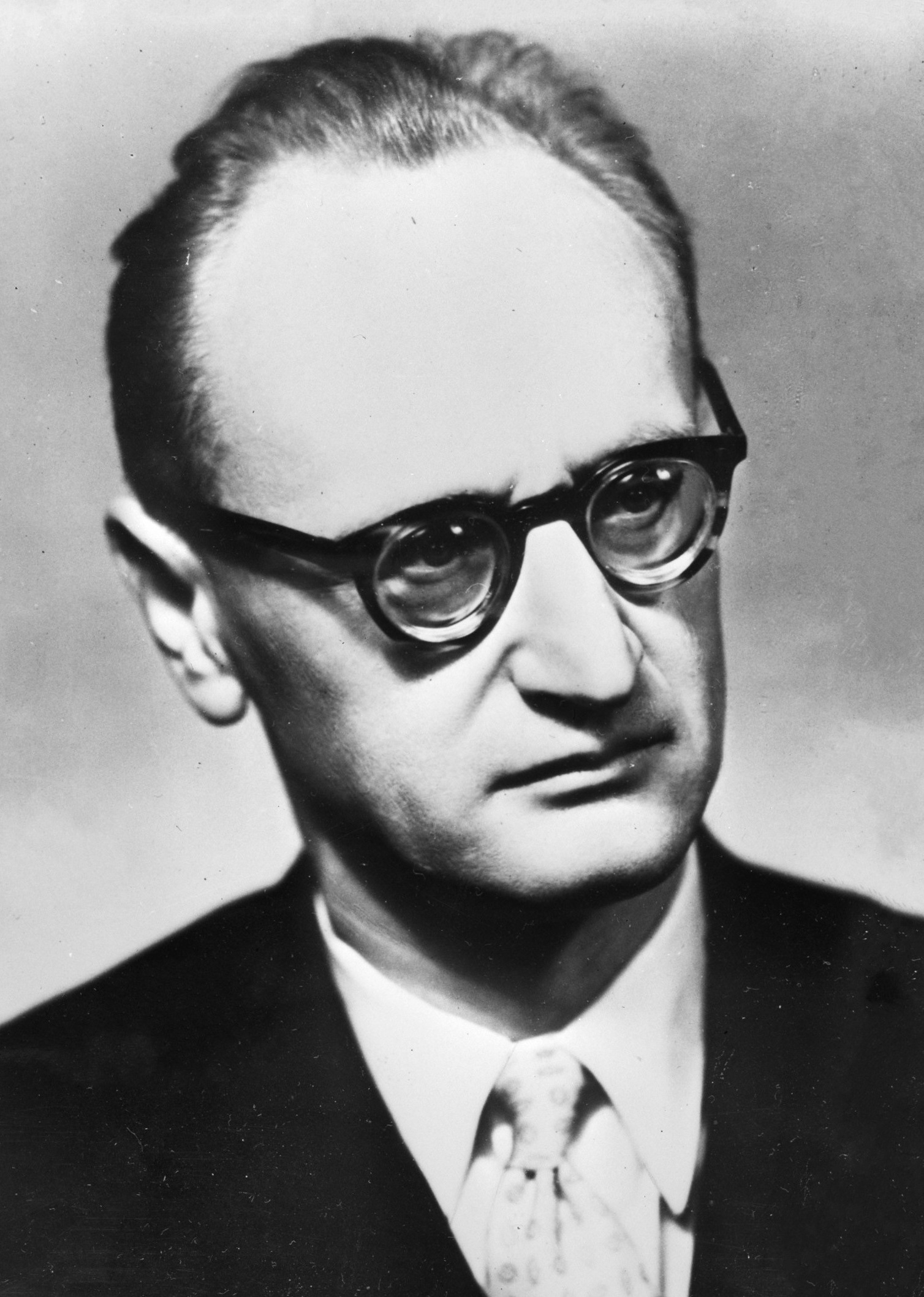

Minister of Foreign Affairs of Czechoslovakia
- In office 8 April 1968 – 19 September 1968
- Preceded by: Václav David
- Succeeded by: Oldřich Černík (acting)

Personal details
- Born: 6 June 1913 Krhanice, Bohemia, Austria-Hungary
- Died: 22 October 1993 (aged 80) Prague, Czech Republic
- Party: Communist Party of Czechoslovakia
- Profession: Lawyer, diplomat, political scientist
- Awards: Charles University

Jiří Hájek (Czech pronunciation: [ˈjɪr̝iː ˈɦaːjɛk]; 6 June 1913 – 22 October 1993) was a Czech politician and diplomat. Together with Václav Havel, Zdeněk Mlynář, and Pavel Kohout, Hájek was one of the founding members and architects of Charter 77.

== Early life and early political career ==
Hájek was born on 6 June 1913 in Krhanice, Bohemia, Austria-Hungary. He studied and worked as a lawyer in the Charles University in Prague. From a young age he was a member of the Czechoslovak Social Democratic Party. During World War II Hájek was imprisoned (1939–1945). After the war he became a member of parliament for the Czechoslovak Social Democratic Party (1945–1948) and probably also a secret member of the Communist Party (code name E-22). During 1948–1969, he was a member of the Central Committee of the Communist Party of Czechoslovakia, during 1950 – 1953 he was the rector of the University of Economics.

== Diplomacy ==
From 1955 Hájek worked in diplomacy: in 1955–1958 as an ambassador in Britain, in 1958–1962 as a deputy of the minister of foreign affairs, and in 1962–1965 he represented Czechoslovakia in United Nations. Between 1965 and 1968 he was the minister of education. From April to September 1968, he served as the minister of foreign affairs in Dubček's government. After the Soviet Union army took control over Czechoslovakia (21 August 1968) he protested against this in a speech at the United Nations (where he used the word occupation) – this caused his dismissal from high offices and even from the communist party (1970).

== Late life ==
Until 1973, Hájek worked in the Historical Institute of Czechoslovak Academy of Sciences.

Together with Václav Havel, Zdeněk Mlynář, and Pavel Kohout, Hájek was one of the founding members and architects of Charter 77.

Jiří Hájek emerged as one of three leading spokesmen of Charter 77, thus becoming the target of police interrogations and threats. He was a strong defender of this uncompromising document, which voiced the principles of universal human rights. In 1987, Hájek was awarded the first ever Professor Thorolf Rafto Memorial Prize.

After the fall of socialism in Czechoslovakia (1989) Hájek served as an advisor of Alexander Dubček (1990–1992) but was unable to obtain significant political influence.

He died of an unspecified cancer in Prague on 22 October 1993.

Government offices
Preceded by Václav David	Minister of Foreign Affairs of Czechoslovakia; April 1968 – September 1968	Succeeded by Ján Marko
