= Jaroslav Hutka =

Czech musician and activist

- Hutka in 2022

Background information
- Born: 21 April 1947 (age 79); Olomouc, Czechoslovakia
- Genre: Folk
- Website: hutka.cz

Jaroslav Hutka (born 21 April 1947 in Olomouc) is a Czech musician, composer, songwriter, and democracy and human rights activist. He was a signatory of Charter 77 and the 2008 Prague Declaration on European Conscience and Communism.

Hutka left Czechoslovakia in October 1978 due to persecution from the Communist authorities, and lived in exile in the Netherlands. After the fall of communism in Czechoslovakia on 26 November 1989, he returned to his native country. His works include Citizen Havel (2008), Schritte im Labyrinth (1990) and Bratřícek Karel (2016).

== Early life ==
Hutka was born on 21 April 1947 in Olomouc, Czechoslovakia. His family was forced to leave their home when Hutka was five years old. Their house was made state property and the family of five consequently lived in one room adjacent to a police station.

== Music career ==
In 1962, he began to study painting in Prague. He dropped out of school in 1966, and began performing music. Hutka and his friend Petr Kalandra were among the first to perform on Charles Bridge. Hutka co-founded the music group Šafrán, which was together until 1977. The StB pressured Hutka and his wife Daniela to emigrate to the Netherlands.

After the Velvet Revolution, Hutka returned to Czechoslovakia. Hutka still performs as a musician. He was interviewed by oral history organisation Post Bellum for their Stories of Our Neighbors project.
