= Vojtěch Sedláček =

Czech entrepreneur (born 1947)

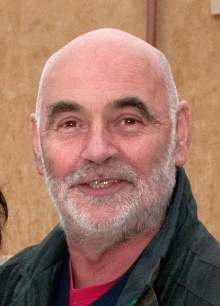
Vojtěch Sedláček 2012

Vojtěch Sedláček (born 3 March 1947 in Prague) is a Czech social entrepreneur, former public official and signatory of Charter 77. His professional career has included computer software development, public administration and social entrepreneurship. He has been involved in creating employment opportunities for people with disabilities and in initiatives supporting people experiencing homelessness and housing insecurity.

== Biography ==
=== Computer programming ===
Sedláček was born in Prague on 3 March 1947. After completing his military service, he began working in 1969 as a technician and programmer of mainframe computers at ZPA Čakovice, a Czechoslovak industrial automation and computer manufacturing company. He later became head of its software department.

He subsequently worked at the Research Institute of Mathematical Machines (Výzkumný ústav matematických strojů, VÚMS), where he participated in the development of operating systems for Czechoslovak mainframe computers. He described this work as a technically demanding field in which specialist expertise was essential.

At VÚMS, he worked with mathematician and philosopher Jan Sokol. Through Sokol, he became acquainted with philosopher Jan Patočka and other members of the dissident community. He also attended private seminars organised by dissidents, including meetings at the homes of Jiří and Dana Němcová and Věra Nováková and Pavel Brázda.

=== Charter 77 ===
In 1977, Sedláček signed Charter 77, a civic initiative calling on the Czechoslovak communist government to respect human rights and its international commitments.

Following his signature, he was questioned by the State Security (StB) and repeatedly reassigned from his specialist programming work to less-qualified and auxiliary duties. His technical expertise remained in demand, however, and he continued to be employed in the computer industry.

=== Teaching and public service ===
Alongside his professional activities, Sedláček worked as a volunteer teacher and educator at the Jedlička Institute in Prague, an institution providing education and care for children with physical disabilities.

After the Velvet Revolution in 1989, he became active in the Civic Forum (Občanské fórum) and served as one of its national representatives. He was elected mayor of Roztoky, a town near Prague. In 1991, he became head of the Office of the Government of the Czech Republic. He later served as Deputy Minister of the Interior in 1998.

=== Social entrepreneurship ===
After 1989, Sedláček founded businesses intended to create employment and entrepreneurial opportunities for people with disabilities. These included Obslužná spol. and Agentura ProVás. One of the early initiatives involved helping Josef Selichar, a former pupil of the Jedlička Institute, establish a business selling medical equipment and aids.

In 2006, he was named Czech Social Entrepreneur of the Year. He has continued to work on initiatives connecting social assistance with practical and sustainable forms of economic activity.

In 2014, he initiated the Nejdřív střecha (Roof First) project in cooperation with the organisation Naděje. The initiative provides temporary accommodation assistance to people experiencing homelessness. Since 2018, the project has been administered by the Committee of Good Will – Olga Havel Foundation.

In 2020, Sedláček launched the Nejdřív doma (Home First) project, which helps families and individuals facing housing insecurity, particularly by providing interest-free loans for rental deposits. The loans are not secured by collateral and are not forcibly recovered if borrowers cannot repay them. Repaid funds can be used to help other families.

In October 2021, Sedláček became chairman of the board of the Committee of Good Will – Olga Havel Foundation (Výbor dobré vůle – Nadace Olgy Havlové).
