= International Theatre Festival DEMOLUDY =

International Theatre Festival DEMOLUDY was an international festival organized by Jaracza Theatre in Olsztyn, Poland. It offers space for multicultural dialog in East European countries.

The Festival presents contemporary drama written after 1989.

== Artistic managers ==
Marcin Zawada (2009-)

Agnieszka Lubomira Piotrowska (2007-2008)

== History ==
=== DEMOLUDY 2012 ===
(Freedom Instead of Flowers)

17–20 October 2012

program:

- doc Theatre (Moscow), TWO IN YOUR HOME
- Katona Theatre (Budapest) THE FIRST LADIES (directed by Tamas Ascher)
- Teatr Act (Bucharest) GAMES IN THE YARD
- Lithuanian National Drama Theatre (Vilnius) CHAOS (directed by Yana Ross)
- Teatr Dramatyczny im. Jerzego Szaniawskiego w Wałbrzychu (Wałbrzych) ALEKSANDRA. RZECZ O PIŁSUDSKIM
- Teatr im Stefana Jaracza w Olsztynie (Olsztyn), KRÓLOWA CIAST/QUEEN OF COOKIES

=== DEMOLUDY 2011 ===
(In A Distorted Mirror)

17–22 October 2011

program:

- Karbido (Wrocław, Poland) TABLE (STOLIK)
- Maladype Színház (Budapest, Hungary) EGG(S)HELL
- Katona József Színház (Budapest, Hungary) RATTLEDANDDISAPPEARED
- Divadlo Buchty A Loutky (Prague, Czech Republic) LYNCH
- Teatrul Mic (Bucharest Romania) SADO MASO BLUES BAR
- Teatrul Tineretului (Piatra Neamţ, Romania) HERR PAUL
- Teatr Ochoty (Warsaw, Poland) OLD HAG (STARUCHA)
- Teatr im. Stefana Jaracza w Olsztynie LOST CZECHOSLOVAKIA (ZAGINIONA CZECHOSŁOWACJA)

=== DEMOLUDY 2010 ===
(Czech Republic and Slovakia)

5–9 October 2010

- Boca Loca Lab (Prague, Czech Republic) EUROPEANS
- Divadlo Na zábradlí (Prague, Czech Republic) MIRACLE IN THE BLACK HOUSE
- Slovenské komorné divadlo (Martin, Slovakia) AND WE WILL WHISPER
- Dejvické divadlo (Prague, Czech Republic) DANGEONS AND DRAGONS
- Bábkové divadlo na Rázcestí (Banská Bystrica, Slovakia) SARCOPHAGUSES AND CASH DISPENSERS
- Divadlo SkRAT (Bratislava, Slovakia) DEAD SOULS
- Teatr im. Stefana Jaracza (Olsztyn, Poland) LEMONIADOWY JOE

=== DEMOLUDY 2009 ===
(Balkan countries)

14–19 September 2009

- Pozorište Atelje 212 (Belgrade, Serbia); ( "Odumiranje" and "Pomorandžina kora")
- Jugoslovensko dramsko pozorište (Belgrade, Serbia); ("Barbelo, o psima i deci" and "Huddersfield")
- Kamerni Teater 55 (Sarajevo, Bosnia and Herzegovina); ("Žaba")
- Slovensko Mladinsko Gledališče (Ljubljana, Slovenia); ("Fragile!")
- KUFER (Zagreb, Croatia); ("O iskrenosti ili odgovornost kapitala")
- Teatr im. Jaracza (Olsztyn, Poland); ("Kobieta-bomba")

=== DEMOLUDY 2008 ===
- Teatr im. Eugene`a Ionesco (Chişinău, Moldova); ("Fuck you, Eu.ro.pa!")
- SounDrama Studio (Moskwa, Russia); ("Gogol. Wieczory")
- Teatr Open Circle (Vilnius, Lithuania); ("Open Circle")
- Teatr Wolny (Minsk, Belarus); ("Strefa milczenia. Tryptyk")
- Teatr Dramatyczny im. Cypriana Kamila Norwida (Jelenia Góra, Poland); ("Podróż poślubna")
- Teatr Współczesny im. Edmunda Wiercińskiego (Wrocław, Poland); ("Księga Rodzaju 2")
- Katarzyna Figura (Warsaw, Poland); ("Badania terenowe nad ukraińskim seksem")
