= Andrej Krob =

Czech theater director and screenwriter (born 1938)

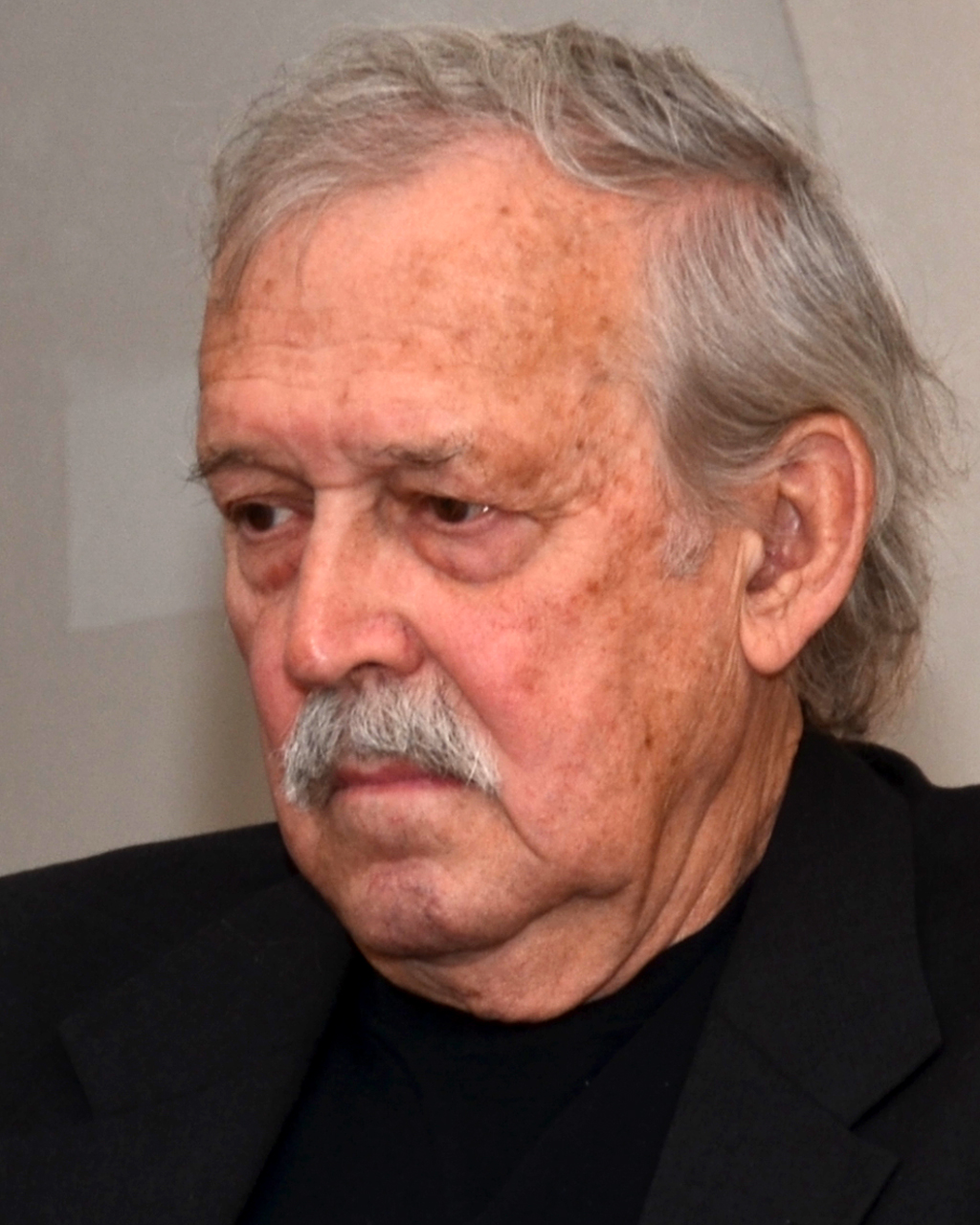
Andrej Krob

Andrej Krob (born 14 April 1938) is a Czech theare director and screenwriter, known for directing stage plays about Václav Havel.

== Life and career ==
Krob was born in Cheb, Czechoslovakia. His mother was of Russian origin, while his father was a descendant of Volhynian Czechs.

From 1963 onward, Krob worked at the Theatre on the Balustrade as a stage technician, and later a stagehand and assistant. There he met director Jan Grossman, as well as Václav Havel, then working as a playwright, and his wife Olga Havlová. In 1975, he founded the Na tahu Theatre. He started the Žebrácká opera with Havel, which criticized the StB.

In the 1970s, he was one of the first signatories of Charter 77, and was subsequently shunned by the theatre community. He then worked as a window seal fitter for several years, however managed to restore his directing career by the end of Communist rule.

He is the father of actress and singer Sylvie Krobová.
