= Vlastimil Třešňák =

Czech musician and writer (born 1950)

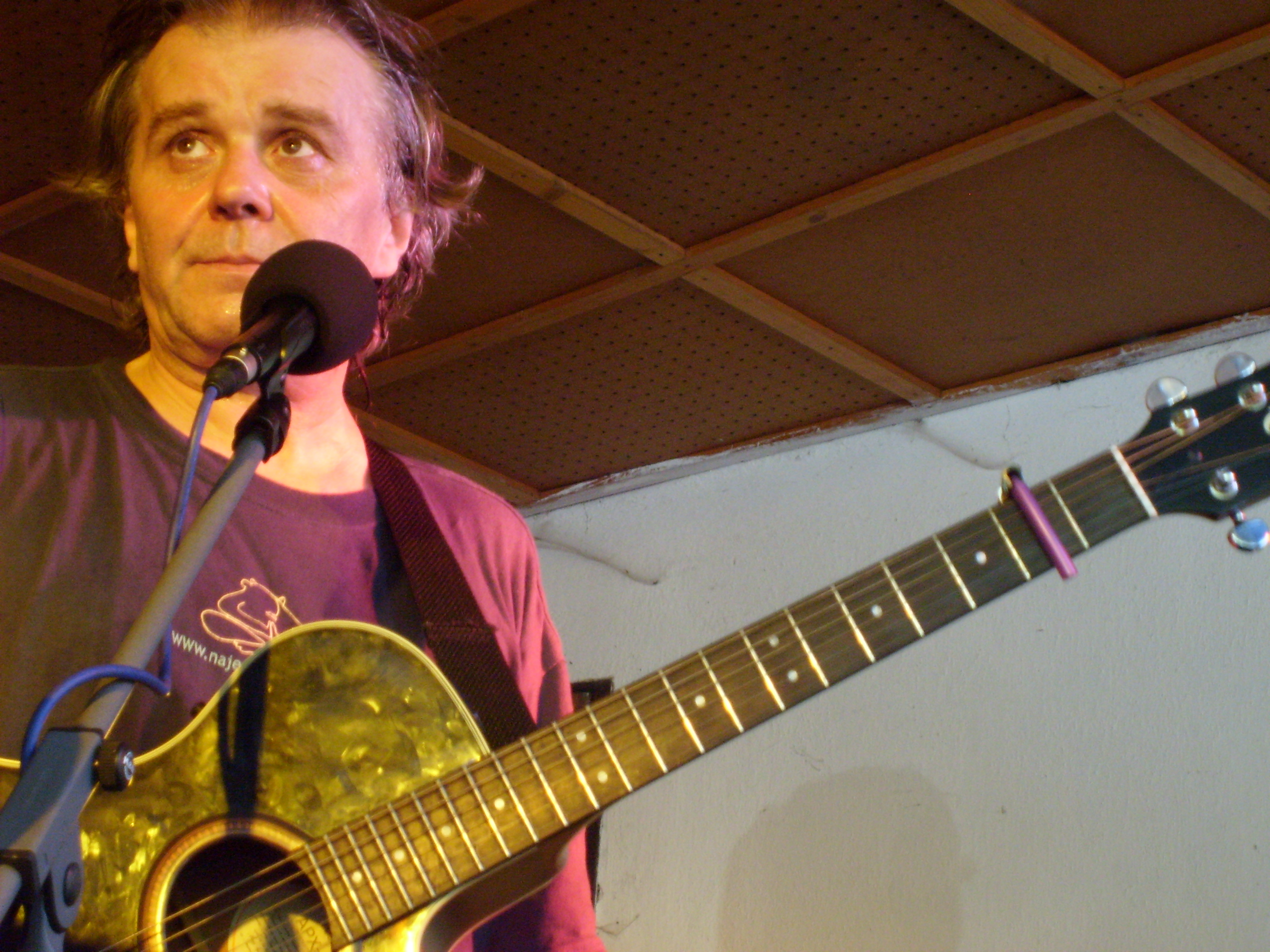
- Vlastimil Třešňák (2007)

Background information
- Also known as: Walter Kirschen
- Born: 26 April 1950 (age 75); Prague, Czechoslovakia
- Genres: Folk rock
- Occupations: Singer-songwriter, writer
- Instrument: Guitar
- Website: tresnak.cz

Vlastimil Třešňák (born 26 April 1950) is a Czech singer-songwriter and writer. In 1970s, he was member of association Šafrán. He signed Charter 77 and after he was banned for public activities throughout Czechoslovakia. In 1982, he was forced to emigrate from Czechoslovakia by StB. He settled in Sweden and returned to Czechoslovakia after the Velvet Revolution. Since then, he released many solo albums; his most recent album Alter ego was released in 2013.

== Discography ==
- Zeměměřič (1979)
- Koh-i-noor (1983)
- Koláž (1995)
- Inventura (2005)
- Skopolamin (2007)
- Němý suflér (2010)
- Alter ego (2013)
