= Zdeněk Mlynář =

Czech Communist politician and lawyer

Zdeněk Mlynář

Zdeněk Mlynář (born Zdeněk Müller; 22 June 1930 – 15 April 1997) was a Czech Communist politician and lawyer. He was the secretary of the Central Committee of the Communist Party of Czechoslovakia during the 1968 Prague Spring. Mlynář wrote the noteworthy political manifesto Towards a Democratic Political Organization of Society which was released on 5 May 1968, at the height of the Prague Spring. He was expelled from the party in 1969 and, having played a key role in establishing Charter 77, forced to emigrate in 1977.

== Life ==
Mlynář was born on 22 June 1930 in Vysoké Mýto, Czechoslovakia. While in exile in Vienna, he wrote an autobiographical account of the Prague Spring and the Warsaw Pact invasion that put an end to it in August 1968. It was published in an English translation called Night Frost in Prague: The End of Humane Socialism.

== Mlynář's role in shaping the politics in Czechoslovakia ==
Mlynář had been a law student in the Soviet Union during the 1950s. He was known to have taken a detached approach to the developments in Czechoslovakia at the time. This bearing allowed him to exercise a critical analysis of the political and social developments taking place in Czechoslovakia and the rest of the region which was under Soviet influence.

The early 1960s signaled a radical transformation in the Eastern European political and social landscape. Sweeping reforms and wide restructuring in various areas of daily life began to take place across the region. The first inklings of freedom of the press began to become apparent with the easing of censorship and the allowance for further debate on various social issues. A more permissive healthcare system gave patients the freedom to choose which doctors would provide for their treatment. Restrictions on religion became less constrained. In addition, the population began to be able to move about more freely as limitations on transportation were eased as well.

It was during this period of positive social and political upheaval that Mlynář was assigned to the task of drafting policy recommendations for the Czechoslovak communist party in 1967. These were to be used for the 13th Party Congress which was planned for 1970. Only three years prior in 1964, at a time when the national assembly of Czechoslovakia was "showing an uncharacteristic liveliness for a communist parliament" (322), Mlynář had made the argument that 'pressure groups' should be allowed to have their say concerning the state machinery. The electoral law had changed by 1967 in that it allowed for more freedom when nominating candidates. The changes also reflected an important advance in that it would be possible to nominate more candidate than there were places to be filled.

Mlynář and his colleagues who were assigned to the difficult task of crafting these new policies devoted their efforts to two main issues: the first was the nature of Czechoslovakia's place in the socialist community. The second was the position of the communist party domestically. The increasing liberalization and gradual sweep of reforms allowed for these questions to be raised for further inquiry. The 1960 constitution had declared that Czechoslovakia had moved into the socialist stage of its development. The communist party's role as the 'instrument of dictatorship' (323) had been removed.

== Mlynář's article: "Towards a Democratic Political Organization of Society" ==
With several questions about the future of the communist party dogging the political leadership Mlynář wrote his piece entitled "Towards a Democratic Political Organization of Society". In it, he arrives at the conclusion that a pluralist system is the best solution for Czechoslovakia. He states his key views regarding the development of politics in Czechoslovakia in the following section:

"Unless there is a change in the position of people in the political system, this state of affairs will not change; without an alteration in people's economic relationships (which the new system should be trying to create), an efficient and dynamic socialist economy cannot be created… And only in this way will people begin to turn their initiative, activity, and talent away from advancing their own private affairs, toward the goal of the social whole, to the search for ways to satisfy their own needs and interests in harmony with the whole development of society… Of course, this is a thesis, a premise. But it is one which does hold some water. It is based on a concept of socialism as a social order which will preserve the active forces in European capitalist development … the necessary independence and subjectivity of the human individual. It is conflict with other conceptions of socialism which do not have this end in view and which are based on the historical conditions of the development of other civilizations, for instance of the East, as we can clearly see in the Chinese conception of socialism. In general, it has been suggested here that more than one kind of political organ must be created. The political system which is based on this principle is called a pluralist system, and it would therefore be true to say that an experiment is going on in Czechoslovakia to create a pluralist society for which there is at present no real analogy among the socialist states. A pluralist political system is quite often identified just with the existence of a large number of political parties. But I do not think this is really right, and all the less so for a socialist society. It is very easy to understand why this question is so much discussed at the moment in Czechoslovakia."

At the time, Mlynář did not consider himself to be anything but a reform communist. The above passage, however, indicates that his concept of socialism closely resembles democratic pluralism, a very dangerous assertion to make, even in a time of reform. In another work of his, entitled Night Frost in Prague: the end of humane socialism Mlynář provides crucial testimony regarding the events of the Prague Spring. In addition, he provides a comprehensive account explaining the blind idealism that inspired many young Czechs and Slovaks to embrace Stalinism in 1945 and the acceptance of a global orthodox Communism during the Cold War.

In 1968, Mlynář was part of the inner circle around then-party head Alexander Dubček. As his writing indicates, he was trying to reconcile the concept of a socialist economy imbued with the ideology of a liberal democracy.

Unlike Dubček, Mlynář had few illusions regarding the real character of the Soviet occupation. Before he lost his position, he retreated to the confines of the National Museum, where he had also conducted insect research for over a decade. Mlynář may have been the only intellectual in the world who is known both for his socio-political accomplishments as well as for his research into insect life.

== The Aftermath: Mlynář's exile ==
In the beginning of 1977, Mlynář became a signatory to Charter 77, a document signed by over a thousand Czechs and Slovaks as well as by many foreign intellectuals that called for all those concerned with human rights to do all they could to spur its development. As a result of this action, Mlynář was expelled from the regime and had to leave Czechoslovakia. The Austrian chancellor Bruno Kreisky allowed him to enter the country and appointed him to a position at the Austrian Institute for International Politics. Mlynář soon established a name for himself as an expert on the developmental tendencies of Soviet regimes.

He led an international research group that concerned itself with investigating what the prerequisites and necessary preconditions were in order to create basic change within these regimes. Some years later this would be termed "Transition Research"; it proved to be one of the most important topics of political science at the time. Mlynář became qualified to teach at the university level and was granted tenure from the University of Innsbruck's department of political science in 1989.

== Friendship with Mikhail Gorbachev ==
Mlynář and Mikhail Gorbachev first met as students at the law school of Moscow University, where they studied together from 1950 to 1955. Their relationship began during this period, with the two sharing a dormitory until Gorbachev's marriage to Raisa Titarenko in 1953. Their relationship was characterized by shared discussions on contemporary issues, particularly those concerning young people. These conversations often took place in their dormitory during evenings, sometimes involving only the two of them and at other times including a wider group of students. This period of shared experiences and intellectual exchange fostered a deep connection between Mlynář and Gorbachev.

The nature of their relationship was notably different from Mlynář's later interactions with the Soviet Politburo in 1968, which were described as "close encounters of an unpleasant kind." Despite the challenges in their personal lives and the complex relations between their respective countries (Czechoslovakia and the Soviet Union), Mlynář and Gorbachev maintained their friendship. This endurance was attributed to their shared worldview and common values, which they had developed since their student days.

In 1967, twelve years after their graduation, Mlynář and Gorbachev reunited. At this time, Gorbachev was serving as the regional Communist Party secretary in the Stavropol region. Their meeting occurred against the backdrop of significant events in Soviet history, including the 20th Congress of the Soviet Communist Party in 1956, the Soviet suppression of the Hungarian uprising, and subsequent political developments under Khrushchev and Brezhnev. During this meeting, Mlynář and Gorbachev discussed their opinions, concerns, and hopes for the future. Mlynář reportedly expressed his belief that the political system in Czechoslovakia needed democratization. Both men concluded that their relationship had remained fundamentally unchanged since their university days, with their shared hopes and ideals intact.

The depth of their friendship was further evidenced in later years. In an interview with a Russian journalist in July 1994, Gorbachev referred to Mlynář as "probably the person I'm closest to. He always has been." This statement was made while Gorbachev mentioned that he and Mlynář were recording the dialogue that would later be published.

Following Gorbachev's rise to power, the relationship between the Soviet Union and Czechoslovakia underwent significant changes. In November 1989, the Husák regime in Czechoslovakia collapsed as a result of the Velvet Revolution. During the protests, several moderate elements in the StB, the Czechoslovak secret police, reportedly hoped to overthrow their superiors and bring Mlynář back from exile to institute reforms. However, Mlynář, having long since renounced Communism, wanted nothing to do with this plot.

Interestingly, Mlynář's wife, Rita Klímová, played a significant role in the Velvet Revolution, serving as one of the leaders and spokeswoman for Civic Forum, a prominent opposition group during this period.

Their enduring friendship, which spanned from their university days through significant political changes in both their countries, demonstrates the personal connections that can persist despite geopolitical tensions. Mlynář was considered Gorbachev's closest Russian friend, highlighting the unique nature of their relationship in the context of Soviet-Czechoslovak relations during the Cold War era.

== Post-Communism ==
After the collapse of Communism, Mlynář saw opportunity to return home to Prague and continue the work that had been violently interrupted in 1968 with the events of the Prague Spring. In 1996, Mlynář competed for election to the Czech parliament as a candidate for the democratic socialist Left Bloc party, but was defeated.

Embittered by the events that were unfolding in Prague, Mlynář returned to Innsbruck where he devoted himself to his research on Eastern and Central Europe.

== Death ==
Mlynář died of lung cancer on 15 April 1997 in Vienna.

== Works ==
- "From Prague to Moscow: August 1968". Telos 41 (Fall 1979). New York: Telos Press.
