= Medal of Merit (Czech Republic) =

Civil medal

Medal of Merit Medaile Za zásluhy
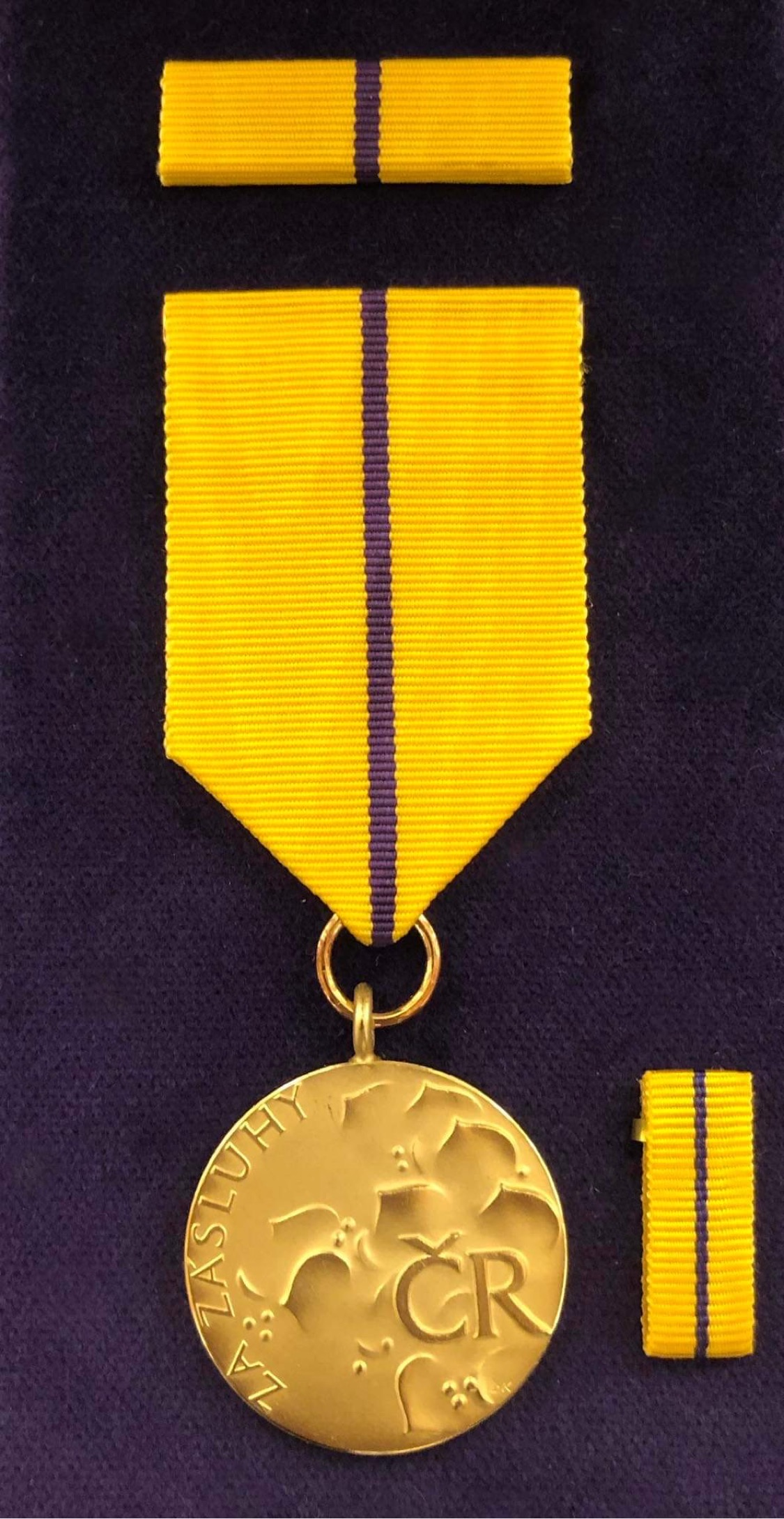
- Medal of Merit, First class
- Type: Decoration
- Awarded for: Meritorious services to the state
- Country: Czech Republic
- Presented by: President of the Czech Republic
- Eligibility: Czech civilians and military members
- Status: Currently awarded
- Established: 9 July 1994
- Ribbon bars of the 1st Grade Ribbon bars of the 2nd Grade Ribbon bars of the 3rd Grade left – ČSFR (1990-92) right – ČR (since 1994)

Precedence
- Next (higher): Medal of Heroism
- Next (lower): Cross of Merit of the Minister of Defence of the Czech Republic

The Medal of Merit (Czech: Medaile Za zásluhy) is an award of the Czech Republic which comes in three grades, the First Grade being the highest. It is awarded to people for service to the Republic in a number of different public areas, including: “the economy, science, technology, culture, arts, sports, enlightenment and education, defense and security of the state and the people”. The medal was designed by Jiří Harcuba.

== Appearance ==
The insignia composes of a simple breast ribbon, primarily yellow-gold in color, and a medal. The ribbon has thin violet stripe(s) running the vertical length of the ribbon; the number of stripes indicates the grade of the medal: a single stripe indicates the highest grade, while three stripes mark the lowest grade. The medals for all three grades are of identical design, with the official symbol of the Medal of Merit, and the inscription “ZA ZÁSLUHY” (“For Meritorious Service”), on the obverse and the Greater Coat of Arms of the Czech Republic on the reverse. The type of metal used indicates the grade: Gilded silver is used for the First Grade, silver for the Second, and bronze for the Third.

== History ==
The Medal of Merit was originally created by the Parliament of the Czechoslovak Federative Republic in 1990. However, no one was awarded the medal prior to its reauthorization by the Parliament of the Czech Republic.
