= Czech Lion Award for Best Editing =

Czech film award

- Country: Czech Republic
- First award: 1993
- Currently held by: Máté Csuport, Šimon Hájek
- Website: https://www.filmovaakademie.cz

Czech Lion Award for Best Editing is award given to the Czech film with best Editing.

== Winners ==
Year	English Name	Original Name	Editor
1993	Horror Story	Krvavý román	Jiří Brožek
1994	Accumulator 1	Akumulátor 1	Alois Fišárek
1995	War of Colours	Válka barev	Jan Mattlach
1996	Kolya	Kolja	Alois Fišárek
1997	An Ambiguous Report About the End of the World	Nejasná zpráva o konci světa	Luděk Hudec
1998	Sekal Has to Die	Je třeba zabít Sekala	Jiří Brožek
1999	Canary	Kanárek	Alois Fišárek
2000	Andel Exit	Anděl Exit	Jiří Brožek
2001	Dark Blue World	Tmavomodrý svět	Alois Fišárek
2002	Year of the Devil	Rok ďábla	David Charap
2003	Boredom in Brno	Nuda v Brně	Jiří Brožek
2004	Champions	Mistři	Pavel Hrdlička
2005	The City of the Sun	Sluneční stát	Jiří Brožek
2006	Pleasant Moments	Hezké chvilky bez záruky	Jiří Brožek
2007	It's Gonna Get Worse	…a bude hůř	Jiří Brožek
2008	Guard No. 47	Hlídač č. 47	Jan Mattlach
2009	Protector	Protektor	Pavel Hrdlička
2010	Kooky	Kuky se vrací	Alois Fišárek
2011	Leaving	Odcházení	Jiří Brožek
2012	In the Shadow	Ve stínu	Michal Lánský
2013	Burning Bush	Hořící keř	Pavel Hrdlička
2014	The Way Out	Cesta ven	Florent Mangeot
2015	Lost in Munich	Ztraceni v Mnichově	Vladimír Barák
2016	A Prominent Patient	Masaryk	Marek Opatrný
2017	Filth	Špína	Jiří Brožek, Michal Lánský, Jana Vlčková
2018	Winter Flies	Všechno bude	Jana Vlčková
2019	The Painted Bird	Nabarvené ptáče	Luděk Hudec
2020	Shadow Country	Krajina ve stínu	Jan Daňhel
2021	Zátopek	Zátopek	Jarosław Kamiński
2022	BANGER.	BANGER.	Šimon Hájek, Jakub Jelínek
2023	Restore Point	Bod obnovy	Jarosław Kamiński
2024	I'm Not Everything I Want to Be	Ještě nejsem, kým chci být	Alexander Kashcheev
2025	Better Go Mad in the Wild	Raději zešílet v divočině	Máté Csuport, Šimon Hájek
