= Jiří Brožek =

Czech film editor

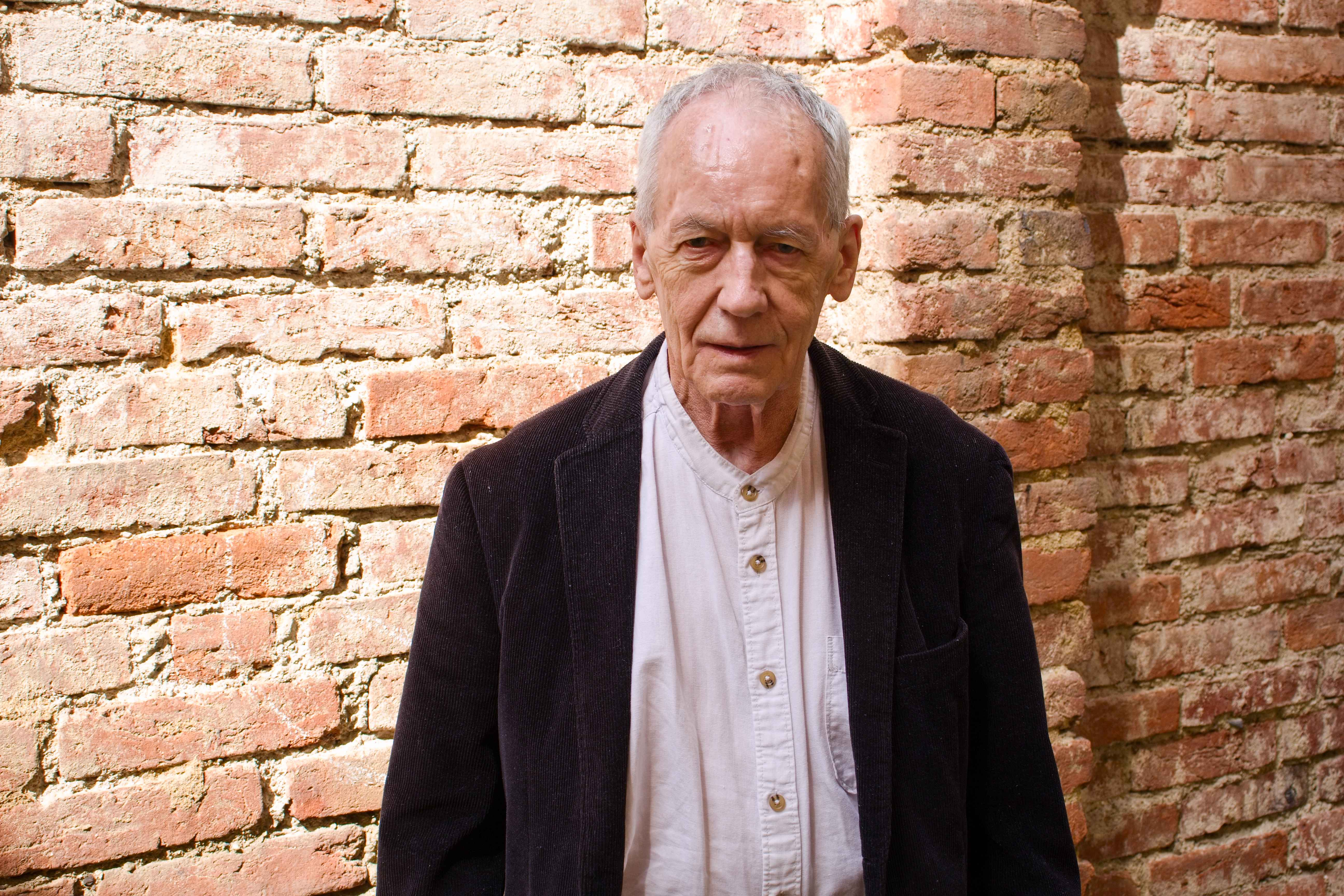
- Born: 11 March 1947 (age 79); Roudnice nad Labem, Czechoslovakia
- Education: Film and TV School of the Academy of Performing Arts in Prague
- Occupation: film editor
- Years active: 1970–2020

Jiří Brožek (born 11 March 1947) is a Czech film editor.

== Biography ==
During 1967‒1973 he attended Editing and Directing at FAMU. Then he started to work in Barrandov Movie Studios, from 1976 Brožek is self-employed. During the career he edited more than 100 feature films, variety of the TV production and many TV series.

He cooperated with Ladislav Smoljak (Ball Lightning, Waiter, Scarper!, Jára Cimrman Lying, Sleeping) Karel Kachyňa (Love Between the Raindrops, Forbidden Dreams), Jiří Menzel (Cutting It Short, The Snowdrop Festival, My Sweet Little Village), Věra Chytilová (Calamity, Wolf's Hole) or Václav Havel (Leaving).

Jiří Brožek was awarded nine Czech Lions for films Krvavý román (1993), Sekal Has to Die (1998), Anděl Exit (2000), Boredom in Brno (2003), The City of the Sun (2005), Pleasant Moments (2006), ...a bude hůř (2007), Leaving (2011) and Filthy (2017), twice he gained Slovak film award Slnko v sieti for The City of the Sun (2006) and Gypsy (2012). He is a member of Czech Film and Television Academy (ČFTA) and honourable member of Slovak Film and Television Academy (SFTA).

He has three children.

== Filmography ==
=== Editor ===
Year	Film	Directed by	Notes
1970	Konečná	Jaroslav Soukup	student film
1971	Temná brána noci	Jaroslav Soukup	student film
1973	Tvrdohlavý Lot	Hussein Moussa	studentský film
1976	Keď poviem Kyjev...	Viera Polakovičová	short documentary
1976	Konečně si rozumíme	Jaroslav Papoušek	
1976	Nedobrovoľný kúpeľ	Viera Polakovičová	
1976	Tri šťastné čerešne	Vladimír Kavčiak	TV film
1976	V znamení Merkúra	Viera Polakovičová	short documentary
1977	Malér	Miroslav Dolejší	student film
1977	Řeknem si to příští léto	Július Matula	
1977	Sázka na třináctku	Dušan Klein	
1977	Tichý Američan v Praze (Quiet American in Prague)	Josef Mach, Štěpán Skalský	
1978	Báječní muži s klikou (Those Wonderful Movie Cranks)	Jiří Menzel	
1978	Kulový blesk (Ball Lightning)	Ladislav Smoljak	
1978	Past na kachnu	Karel Kovář	
1978	Střepy pro Evu	Rudolf Adler	
1979	Drsná Planina	Jaroslav Soukup	
1979	Kam nikdo nesmí	Dušan Klein	
1979	Lásky mezi kapkami deště (Love Between the Raindrops)	Karel Kachyňa	
1979	Panelstory aneb jak se rodí sídliště (Prefab Story)	Věra Chytilová	
1979	Zlatí úhoři	Karel Kachyňa	
1979	Žena pro tři muže	Jaroslav Papoušek	
1980	Cukrová bouda (The Little Sugar House)	Karel Kachyňa	
1980	Kalamita (Calamity)	Věra Chytilová	
1980	Krkonošské pohádky (Fairy-tale at Krkonose Mountains)	Věra Jordánová	TV series; season 2
1980	Nevěsta k zulíbání	Július Matula	
1980	Postřižiny (Cutting It Short)	Jiří Menzel	
1980	Romaneto	Jaroslav Soukup	
1980	Vrchní, prchni! (Waiter, Scarper!)	Ladislav Smoljak	
1981	Dostih	Jaroslav Soukup	
1981	Chytilová versus Forman	Věra Chytilová	TV documentary (Belgium)
1981	Jako zajíci (Like Rabbits)	Karel Smyczek	
1981	Pozor, vizita!	Karel Kachyňa	
1981	Zakázaný výlet	Štěpán Skalský	
1982	Brehy nehy	Fero Fenič	TV film
1982	Dahome	Magdalena Příhodová	student film
1982	Jak svět přichází o básníky (How the World Is Losing Poets)	Dušan Klein	
1982	Když rozvod, tak rozvod	Štěpán Skalský	
1982	Plaché příběhy	Dobroslav Zborník, Tomáš Tintěra	
1982	Poslední vlak	Július Matula	
1982	Slaná růže	Janusz Majewski	
1982	Sněženky a machři	Karel Smyczek	
1982	Vítr v kapse	Jaroslav Soukup	
1983	Fandy, ó Fandy	Karel Kachyňa	
1983	Jára Cimrman ležící, spící (Jára Cimrman Lying, Sleeping)	Ladislav Smoljak	
1983	Lekár umierajúceho času	Miloslav Luther	TV series
1983	Radikální řez	Dušan Klein	
1983	Sestřičky (Nurses)	Karel Kachyňa	
1983	Slavnosti sněženek (The Snowdrop Festival)	Jiří Menzel	
1983	Záchvěv strachu	Jaroslav Soukup	
1984	1984 – Rok Orwella	Jiří Sozanský	short experiment
1984	Cesta kolem mé hlavy	Jaroslav Papoušek	
1984	Džusový román	Fero Fenič	
1984	Jak básníci přicházejí o iluze (How Poets Are Losing Their Illusions)	Dušan Klein	
1984	Krkonošské pohádky (Fairy-tale at Krkonose Mountains)	Věra Jordánová	TV series; season 3
1984	Láska z pasáže	Jaroslav Soukup	
1984	Rozpuštěný a vypuštěný (Dissolved and Effused)	Ladislav Smoljak	
1984	Sanitka (The Ambulance)	Jiří Adamec	TV series
1984	Všechno nebo nic	Štěpán Skalský	
1984	Všichni mají talent	Zdeněk Flídr	
1985	Balada o snu	Eva Marie Bergerová	ballet
1985	Duhová kulička	Karel Kachyňa	TV film
1985	Tísňové volání	Miloš Zábranský	
1985	Vesničko má středisková (My Sweet Little Village)	Jiří Menzel	
1985	Vlak dětství a naděje (The Train of Childhood and Expectation)	Karel Kachyňa	TV series
1985	Všichni musí být v pyžamu	Jaroslav Papoušek	
1986	Conversation 5, 6 & 8	Richard Balous	short experiment
1986	Dobré světlo	Karel Kachyňa	
1986	Kdo se bojí, utíká	Dušan Klein	
1986	Parallel touches	Richard Balous	short experiment
1986	Krajina s nábytkem	Karel Smyczek	
1986	Pěsti ve tmě	Jaroslav Soukup	
1986	Smrt krásných srnců (Forbidden Dreams)	Karel Kachyňa	
1986	Stromboli	Richard Balous	unfinished short experiment
1986	Vlčí bouda (Wolf's Hole)	Věra Chytilová	
1987	Discopříběh	Jaroslav Soukup	
1987	Jak básníkům chutná život (How Poets Are Enjoying Their Lives)	Dušan Klein	
1987	Když v ráji pršelo	Magdalena Pivoňková	
1987	Moře začíná za vsí	Zdeněk Flídr	
1987	Nejistá sezóna (An Uncertain Season)	Ladislav Smoljak	
1987	Šašek a královna (The Jester and the Queen)	Věra Chytilová	
1988	Dobří holubi se vracejí	Dušan Klein	
1988	Kamarád do deště	Jaroslav Soukup	
1988	Oznamuje se láskám vašim	Karel Kachyňa	
1988	Pražská pětka	Tomáš Vorel	
1988	Tichý společník	Zdeněk Flídr	
1989	Archa bláznů	Ctibor Turba	scenic montage
1989	Atrakce švédského zájezdu	Zoran Gospić	
1989	Blázni a děvčátka	Karel Kachyňa	
1989	Člověk proti zkáze	Štěpán Skalský, Jaromír Pleskot	
1989	Konec starých časů	Jiří Menzel	
1989	Něžný barbar	Petr Koliha	
1989	Vážení přátelé, ano	Dušan Klein	
1990	Kouř (The Smoke)	Tomáš Vorel	
1990	Poslední motýl (The Last Butterfly)	Karel Kachyňa	
1990	Silnější než já	Petr Šícha	
1990	Sladké jarní hry	Pavel Aujezdský	
1990	Svědek umírajícího času	Miloslav Luther	
1990	Vracenky	Jan Schmidt	
1990	Zvláštní bytosti	Fero Fenič	
1991	Žebrácká opera (The Beggar's Opera)	Jiří Menzel	
1992	Lepší je být bohatý a zdravý než chudý a nemocný	Juraj Jakubisko	
1992	Městem chodí Mikuláš	Karel Kachyňa	TV film
1993	Andělské oči	Dušan Klein	
1993	Faust on a String	Michael Baumbruck	short documentary
1993	Konec básníků v Čechách	Dušan Klein	
1993	Krvavý román (Horror Story)	Jaroslav Brabec	
1993	Život a neobyčejná dobrodružství vojáka Ivana Čonkina (The Life and Extraordinary Adventures of Private Ivan Chonkin)	Jiří Menzel	
1994	Amerika	Vladimír Michálek	
1994	Měsíční údolí	Petr Nikolaev and others	special occasion
1994	Prima sezóna	Karel Kachyňa	TV series
1994	Příliš hlučná samota (Too Loud a Solitude)	Věra Caïs	
1994	Situace vlka	Jan Schmidt, F. A. Brabec	unfinished film
1995	Má je pomsta (Revange)	Lordan Zafranović	
1995	Mladí muži poznávají svět (Young Men Discovering the World)	Radim Špaček	played documentary
1996	Bubu a Filip	Milan Šteindler	TV series
1996	Holčičky na život a na smrt	Jaroslav Brabec	
1996	Tři životy Vladimíra Pucholta	Miloslav Šmídmajer, Martin Slunečko	dokumentary
1997	Modré z nebe	Eva Borušovičová	
1997	Výchova dívek v Čechách (Bringing Up Girls in Bohemia)	Petr Koliha	
1998	Česká soda (Czech Soda)	Fero Fenič and others	TV series
1998	Je třeba zabít Sekala (Sekal Has to Die)	Vladimír Michálek	
1999	Daruj krev	Jiří Krejčík	documentary
1999	Praha očima... (Prague Stories)	collective	stories Karty jsou rozdaný... (d. Vladimír Michálek), Obrázky z výletu (d. Martin Šulík), Riziko (d. Artemio Benki)
2000	Anděl Exit	Vladimír Michálek	
2000	Český Robinson	Dušan Klein	TV film
2000	Vlci ve městě	Petr Nikolaev	TV film
2001	Babí léto (Autumn Spring)	Vladimír Michálek	
2001	Muž, který vycházel z hrobu	Dušan Klein	TV film
2001	Milan Hlavsa a Plastic People of the Universe	Jana Chytilová	document
2001	Stříbrná paruka	Jan Schmidt	series
2001	Vadí nevadí	Eva Borušovičová	
2002	Černá slečna, slečna Černá	Petr Nikolaev	TV film
2002	Elixír a Halíbela	Dušan Klein	TV film
2002	Klíč k určování trpaslíků podle deníku Pavla Juráčka (The Key for Determining Dwarfs or The Last Travel of Lemuel Gulliver)	Martin Šulík	document
2002	Miláček	Dušan Klein	TV film
2002	Perníková věž	Milan Šteindler	
2003	Krysař (The Pied Piper)	F. A. Brabec	
2003	Městečko aneb Sláva vítězům, čest poraženým	Jan Kraus	
2003	Nuda v Brně (Boredom in Brno)	Vladimír Morávek	
2003	Záchranáři	Vladimír Michálek	TV series
2004	Lovec a datel	Vladimír Michálek	TV film
2005	Eden	Petr Nikolaev, Jiří Chlumský	TV series
2005	Hrubeš a Mareš jsou kamarádi do deště	Vladimír Morávek	
2005	Portréty	collective	episode Ivan Wernisch, básník (d. Jana Chytilová)
2005	Sluneční stát aneb hrdinové dělnické třídy (The City of the Sun)	Martin Šulík	
2006	Hezké chvilky bez záruky (Pleasant Moments)	Věra Chytilová	
2006	Obsluhoval jsem anglického krále (I Served the King of England)	Jiří Menzel	
2007	...a bude hůř (It's Gonna Get Worse)	Petr Nikolaev	
2008	O rodičích a dětech (Of Parents and Children)	Vladimír Michálek	
2008	Proč bychom se netopili	Petr Nikolaev	TV series
2008	Zlatá šedesátá (Golden Sixties)	Martin Šulík	documentary series
2009	Klub osamělých srdcí (Lonely Hearts Club)	Petr Nikolaev	TV film
2009	Operace Dunaj	Jacek Glomb	
2010	25 ze šedesátých aneb Československá nová vlna	Martin Šulík	documentary film
2010	Cizí příběh	Juraj Deák	TV film
2010	Jarmareční bouda (Market Chalet)	Pavel Dražan	
2011	Cigán (Gypsy)	Martin Šulík	
2011	Odcházení (Leaving)	Václav Havel	
2011	Tajemství staré bambitky	Ivo Macharáček	TV film
2012	Nevinné lži	Vojtěch Kotek and others	TV series; episode 2 season 1 – Lež má rozbité auto
2012	Tvoje slza, můj déšť: Přítomnost Arnošta Lustiga	Eva Lustigová	documentary film
2013	Co v detektivce nebylo	Jaroslav Brabec	TV film
2013	Donšajni (The Don Juans)	Jiří Menzel	
2013	Chvilková slabost	Jaroslav Brabec	TV film
2013	Kovář z Podlesí (The Blacksmith from Woodham)	Pavel Göbl	
2013	Po Jantarové stezce	Jana Chytilová	documentary film
2013	Slečna Flintová	Jaroslav Brabec	TV film
2014	Československý filmový zázrak	Martin Šulík	documentary series
2014	My 2 (US 2)	Slobodanka Raduň	
2014	Nevinné lži	Jitka Rudolfová and others	TV series; episode 4 season 2 – Moje pravda
2015	Život je život	Milan Cieslar	
2016	Decibely lásky	Miroslav Halík	
2016	Jak se zbavit nevěsty	Tomáš Svoboda	
2016	Tenkrát v ráji	Petr Pálka	
2017	Špína	Tereza Nvotová	
2018	GEN – Galerie elity národa	collective	documetary series, episode Jaromír Šofr (d. Radomír Šofr)
2018	Pasažéři	Jana Boršková	dokumentary
2019	Cena za štěstí	Olga Dabrowská	
2019	Jaroslav Kučera Zblízka	Jakub Felcman, Tomáš Michálek	dokumentary

=== Cooperation ===
Year	Film	Directed by	Notes
1974	Televize v Bublicích aneb Bublice v televizi	Jaroslav Papoušek	assistent editor (Jiřina Lukešová)
1976	Na samotě u lesa	Jiří Menzel	assistent editor (Jiřina Lukešová)
1989	Vojtěch, řečený sirotek (Vojtech, Called the Orphan)	Zdeněk Tyc	supervising editor (Boris Machytka)
1993	Krvavý román (Horror Story)	Jaroslav Brabec	scriptwriting and dramaturgical cooperation
1994	Příliš hlučná samota (Too Loud a Solitude)	Věra Caïs	art collaboration, subtitle design
2003	Bezesné noci (Dreamless Nights)	David Čálek, Radim Špaček	documentary film
2012	Policejní historky	Pavel Dražn	cooperative editor

=== Actor ===
Year	Film	Character	Directed by
1976	Konečně si rozumíme	man at the phone booth	Jaroslav Papoušek
1976	Na samotě u lesa	mourner at the funeral	Jiří Menzel
1989	Čas sluhů (Time of the Servants)	Prague citizen	Irena Pavlásková
1991	Corpus Delicti	friend of Viki	Irena Pavlásková
1993	Krvavý román (Horror Story)	passer-by	Jaroslav Brabec
1994	Příliš hlučná samota (Too Loud a Solitude)	imaginary character of gentleman	Věra Caïs
