= Faik =

Faik is a given name. Notable people with the name include:

- Sait Faik Abasıyanık (1906–1954), Turkish writer
- Faik Konica (1875–1942), Albanian writer
- Ali Faik Zaghloul (1924–1995), Egyptian radio presenter

== See also ==
- FAIK is the abbreviation for Finspångs AIK, a sports club in Sweden
- Vaic, people with this Slavic surname
