= Alex Zucker =

American translator

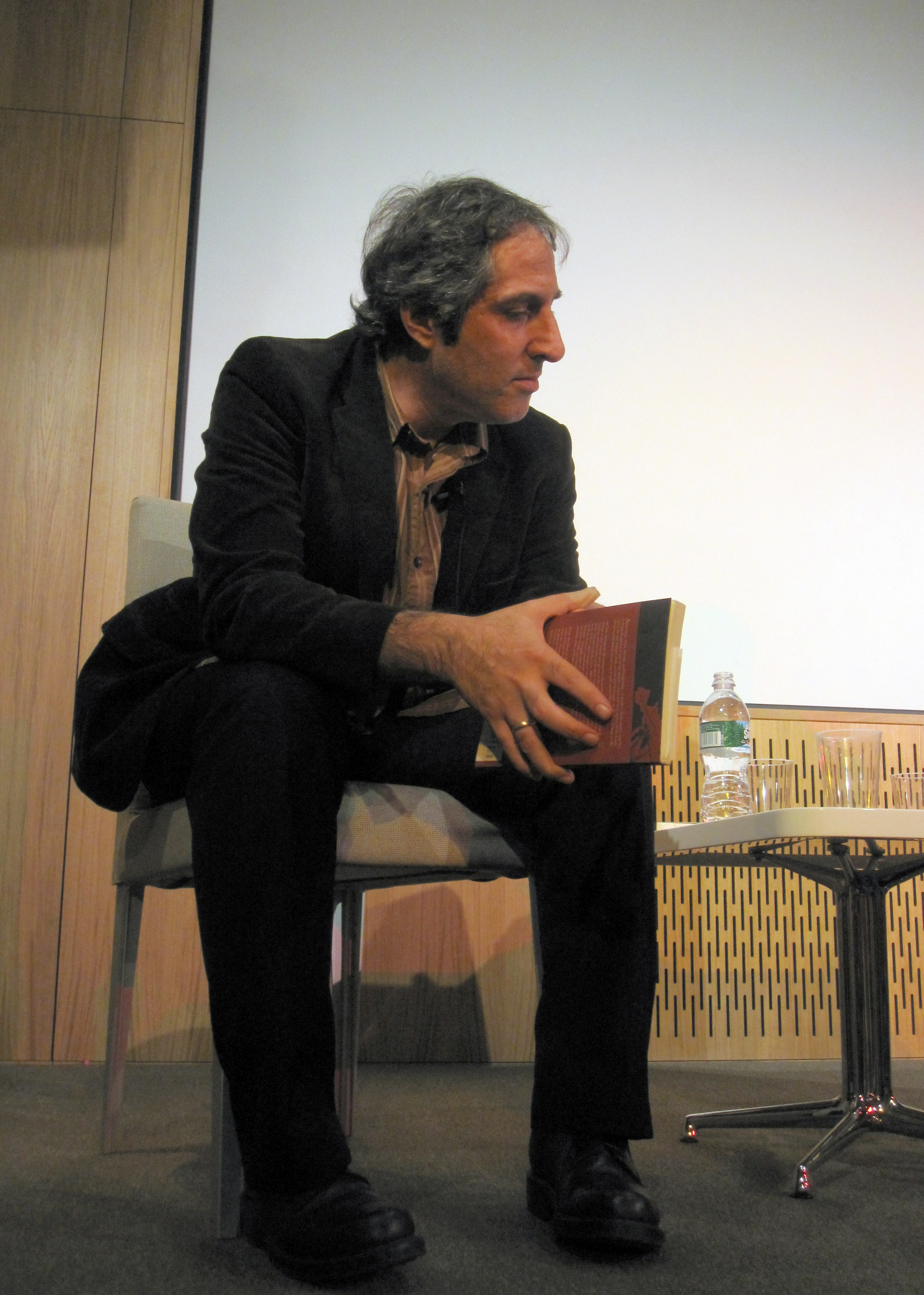
- Alex Zucker in 2009
- Born: September 1, 1964 (age 62); New Brunswick, New Jersey
- Education: University of Massachusetts Amherst; Columbia University
- Occupation: Translator

Alex Zucker (born September 1, 1964) is a U.S. literary translator.

== Life and career ==
Zucker was born in New Brunswick, New Jersey. From ages 4 to 17, he lived in East Lansing, Michigan. He attended college at University of Massachusetts Amherst, obtaining a Bachelor of Science in Zoology in 1986. In 1990, he received a master's in international affairs from the School of International and Public Affairs at Columbia University, with a certificate from the Institute on East Central Europe.

During his years in Prague (1990–95), he worked as editor-translator for the English-language section of the Czech News Agency, copy editor–translator for the English-language newspaper Prognosis, and freelance translator for a variety of Czech and English-language cultural reviews and literary magazines, including Raut, Trafika, Yazzyk, and Zlatý řez.

From 1996 to 2000, he copyedited for Swing, Condé Nast Traveler, Interview (magazine), and Vanity Fair (magazine), as well as for Aperture publishing house and Bookforum.

From 2002 to 2004, Zucker taught Czech at the NYU School of Continuing and Professional Studies.

In 2010, Zucker won the National Translation Award for his translation of Petra Hůlová's début novel of 2002, All This Belongs to Me.

In 2011, he received a Creative Writing Fellowship from the National Endowment for the Arts to support his translation of the 1931 Czech classic Marketa Lazarová, by Vladislav Vančura.

== Selected translations ==
- Love Letter in Cuneiform, a novel by Tomáš Zmeškal (Margellos World Republic of Letters at Yale University Press, 2016)
- Midway Upon the Journey of Our Life, a novel by Josef Jedlička (Karolinum Press, 2016)
- Innocence; or, Murder on Steep Street, a novel by Heda Margolius Kovályová (Soho Press, 2015)
- The Devil's Workshop, a novel by Jáchym Topol (Portobello Books/Granta, 2013)
- The Opportune Moment, 1855, a novel by Patrik Ouředník (Dalkey Archive Press, 2011)
- Case Closed, a novel by Patrik Ouředník (Dalkey Archive Press, 2010)
- All This Belongs to Me, a novel by Petra Hůlová (Writings from an Unbound Europe, Northwestern University Press, 2009). Winner of the 2010 National Translation Award.
- Minach, a play by Iva Klestilová Volánková, in Czech Plays: Seven New Works, ed. Marcy Arlin, Gwynn MacDonald, and Dr. Daniel Gerould (Martin E. Segal Theatre Center, 2009).
- A Well-paid Walk, subtitles, Dobře placená procházka (1966), dir. Miloš Forman, U.S. premiere, Milos Forman, A Retrospective, Museum of Modern Art, February 14–28, 2008.
- "The Game," by Ivan Blatný, in The Drug of Art: Selected poems of Ivan Blatný (Ugly Duckling Presse, 2007)
- The Unlucky Man in the Yellow Cap, lyrics and translation of Zuzana Justman's adaptation of the original play with music by J. R. Pick, directed by Marcy Arlin. Other lyrics by Peter Fish (also music), Zuzana Justman, and J. R. Pick.
- City Sister Silver, a novel by Jáchym Topol (Catbird Press, 2000). Featured in 1001 Books You Must Read Before You Die.
- More Than One Life, a novel by Miloslava Holubová, translated with Lyn Coffin and Zdenka Brodská (Hydra Books, Northwestern University Press, 1999).
- "The Sightseers" by Michal Viewegh and "Sister" by Jáchym Topol, in Daylight in Nightclub Inferno: Czech Fiction From the Post-Kundera Generation, ed. Elena Lappin (Catbird Press, 1997).
- "Kchony Sees the World" by Ladislav Fuks, "Honking Horns" by Jiří Gruša, and "A Trip to the Railway Station" by Jáchym Topol, in This Side of Reality: Modern Czech Writing, ed. Alexandra Büchler (Serpent's Tail, 1996).
- "GM" by Gustav Meyrink and "A Trip to the Train Station" by Jáchym Topol, in Prague: A Traveler's Literary Companion, ed. Paul Wilson (Whereabouts Press, 1995).
- A Trip to the Train Station, a novella by Jáchym Topol (Petrov, 1995)

Zucker has also translated lyrics by Filip Topol, leader of the Czech rock group Psí vojáci (Dog Soldiers).
