= Zaghloul =

Zaghloul is an Arabic masculine given name and surname. People with this name include:

== Given name ==
- Zaghloul El-Naggar (1933–2025), Egyptian geologist, Muslim scholar, and author

== Surname ==
- Ali Faik Zaghloul (1924–1995), Egyptian radio presenter
- Fayez Zaghloul (born 1959), Syrian boxer
- Lutfi Zaghloul (born 1938), Palestinian poet
- Mohamed Zaghloul (born 1993), Egyptian wrestler
- Mona Zaghloul, Egyptian-American electronics engineer
- Saad Zaghloul (1859–1927), Egyptian revolutionary and statesman
- Saad Zagulul Faruk (died 2003), Bangladeshi politician
- Safiya Zaghloul (1878–1946), Egyptian political activist
- S. M. Jaglul Hayder (born 1963), Bangladeshi politician
