= Dog Soldiers (disambiguation) =

Dog Soldiers is a Cheyenne Indian military society, whose members were also referred to as "Dog Men".

Dog Soldier, Dog Soldiers, or Dog Men may also refer to:

- Dogs in warfare

== Films ==
- Dog Soldiers (1978), an alternative title for Who'll Stop the Rain, the film adaptation of Robert Stone's novel Dog Soldiers (1974)
- Dog Soldiers (film), a 2002 horror film
- Last of the Dogmen (1995), a fictional film about the search for and discovery of an unknown band of Dog Soldiers from a tribe of Cheyenne Indians, who escaped the 1864 Sand Creek massacre and survived for more than a 100 years secluded in the Montana wilderness

== Other uses in arts, entertainment, and media ==
- "Dog Soldier" (July 2012), season 1, episode 5 of the Longmire television series
- Dog Soldier, a Japanese manga by Tetsuya Saruwatari
- Dog Soldiers (novel), a 1974 novel by Robert Stone
- Dog Soldiers, the Homeworld soldiers of Baron Karza from the Micronauts (comics)
- Psí vojáci (English translation: Dog Soldiers), a Czech rock band fronted by Filip Topol
