= Farma (Czech TV series) =

- Genre: reality TV series
- Directed by: Peter Nuňéz
- Presented by: Tereza Pergnerová
- Country of origin: Czech Republic
- Original language: Czech

Production
- Production locations: Žítková, Czech Republic
- Running time: 60 minutes

Original release
- Network: Nova
- Release: 24 June – 26 August 2012

Farma — Padne kosa na kámen (or only Farma, "The Farm") is the Czech version of the reality TV series The Farm based on the Swedish TV series of the same name. The show filmed in June–August 2012 and premiered on 24 June 2012 on Nova.

== Format ==
Twelve contestants are cut out from outside world. Each week one contestant is selected the Farmer of the Week. In the first week, the productions choose the Farmer. Since week 2, the Farmer is chosen by the contestant evicted in the previous week.

=== Nomination process ===
The Farmer of the Week nominates two people (a man and a woman) as the Butlers. The others must decide, which Butler is the first to go to the Battle. That person than choose the second person (from the same sex) for the Battle and also the type of battle (a quiz, tug-of-war, cutting wood). The Battle winner must win one duel. The Battle loser is evicted from the game. In the live final 26 August 2012 Michal Páleník won 1 000 000 Kč . Šárka Havrlíková finish on the second place.

=== Contestants ===
(ages stated are at time of contest)

Contestant	Age	Background	Residence	Status	Finish
David Hudák	33	Manager	Brno	1st Evicted on Day 7	12th
Jana Stránská	26	Assistant	Liberec	2nd Evicted on Day 14	11th
Sára Sihelská	20	Unemployed	Stříbro	3rd Evicted on Day 21	10th
Michaela Králová	28	Distillery Manager	Vítkov	Quit on Day 35	9th
Libuše Vostrá	50	Shop Assistant	Kamenice nad Lipou	Quit on Day 45	8th
Jana Kadeřávková	21	Stripper	Prague	Quit on Day 45	7th
Miroslav Tyrš	32	Repairman	Plzeň	4th Evicted on Day 49	6th
Jakub Reithmaier	21	Student	Plzeň	5th Evicted on Day 56	5th
Jiří Král	22	Advertiser	Brno	6th Evicted on Day 60	4th
Milan Buriánek	53	Zootechnican	Říčany	3rd place on Day 61	3rd
Šárka Havrlíková	36	Waitress	Prague	Runner-up on Day 63	2nd
Michal Páleník	21	Unemployed	Prague	Winner on Day 63	1st

=== Nominations ===
	Day 01 - 07	Day 08 - 14	Day 15 - 21	Day 22 - 28	Day 29 - 35	Day 36 - 42	Day 43 - 48	Day 49	Day 50 - 57	Day 58	Day 59	Day 60	Day 61 - 62	Day 63
Farmer of the Week (Immunity)	Milan	Sára	Šárka	Miroslav	Libuše	Libuše	Šárka		Jiří			Milan; Michal	Michal	
Butlers (Nominated)	David; Libuše	Michal; Jana S.	Milan; Libuše	Milan; Libuše	Jiří; Šárka	Jakub; Jana K.	Miroslav; Jana K.		Jakub; Šárka	Michal; Milan	Jakub; Šárka	Jiří; Šárka	Jiří; Šárka	
Michal	Libuše	Nominated	Libuše	Milan	Šárka	Jakub			Jakub	Nominated		Immunity	Farmer of the Week	Winner
Šárka	David	Michal	Libuše	Libuše	Nominated	Jana K.	Farmer of the Week		Nominated		Nominated	Nominated	Nominated	Runner-up
Milan	Farmer of the Week	Michal	Nominated	Nominated	Evicted (Day 28)				Return to the farm	Nominated		Immunity	Nominated	3rd place (Day 61)
Jiří	David	Jana S.	Milan	Libuše	Nominated	Jakub			Farmer of the Week		Nominated	Nominated	Evicted (Day 60)	
Jakub	David	Jana S.	Libuše	Milan	Jiří	Nominated	Evicted (Day 42)	Return to the farm	Nominated	Evicted (Day 56)				
Miroslav	Libuše	Jana S.	Milan	Farmer of the Week	Šárka	Jakub	Nominated		Evicted (Day 49)					
Jana K.	David	Removed due to Injury (Day 5)		Return to the farm	Jiří	Nominated	Nominated	Quit (Day 45)						
Libuše	Nominated	Michal	Nominated	Nominated	Farmer of the Week	Farmer of the Week		Quit (Day 45)						
Michaela	David	Jana S.	Milan	Milan	Jiří	Quit (Day 35)								
Sára	David	Farmer of the Week	Libuše	Evicted (Day 21)										
Jana S.	David	Nominated	Evicted (Day 14)											
David	Nominated	Evicted (Day 7)												
1st Nominated (By Group)	David; 7/9 votes	Jana S. 4/7 votes	Libuše; 4/7 votes	Milan; 3/5 votes	Jiří; 3/5 votes	Jakub; 3/4 votes	Miroslav; Automatically		Jakub; 1/1 vote	Butlers duel		Ex-Farmer's; Vote	Milan; Šárka	Final duel
2nd Nominated (by 1st Nominated)	Jakub	Michaela	Sára	Michal	Jakub	Miroslav	Jiří		Michal	Butlers duel		Ex-Farmer's; Vote	Milan; Šárka	Final duel
Evicted	Jana K. Withdrew	Jana S. Lost duel	Sára; Lost duel	Milan; Lost duel	Jakub; Saved	Jakub; Lost duel	Libuše; Quit	Miroslav; Lost duel	Jakub; Lost duel	Michal; Milan; Wins butlers duel		Jiří; Ex-Farmer's choice to evict	Milan; Lost duel	Šárka; Won 1 final duel
Evicted	David; Lost duel	Jana S. Lost duel	Sára; Lost duel	Jana K. Return to the farm	Michaela; Quit	Jakub; Lost duel	Jana K. Quit	Jakub; Return to the farm	Milan; Return to the farm	Michal; Milan; Wins butlers duel		Michal; Ex-Farmer's choice to first finalist	Milan; Lost duel	Michal; Won 3 final duels

Week 5: Michaela quit, Jakub lost duel but stayed on the Farm.
Week 7: Libuše accepted 100 000 Kč and quit. Because there were not 2 woman, Miroslav was automatically nominated.
Jana K. was mad about Libuše leaving, so she quit the Farm. Jakub return to the farm.
Week 8: Farmers broke rules. Losing back to the farm of one former farmer.

=== Choice to evict - Day 60 ===
Ex-Farmer	Jiří 6/8 votes	Šárka 2/8 votes
Jakub	Jiří	
Miroslav		Šárka
Jana K.	Jiří	
Libuše	Jiří	
Michaela	Jiří	
Sára	Jiří	
Jana S.	Jiří	
David		Šárka

=== Vote on the first finalist - Day 60 ===
Ex-Farmer	Michal 8/9 votes	Milan 1/9 votes
Jiří	Michal	
Jakub		Milan
Miroslav	Michal	
Jana K.	Michal	
Libuše	Michal	
Michaela	Michal	
Sára	Michal	
Jana S.	Michal	
David	Michal	
