= Josef Topol =

Czech playwright

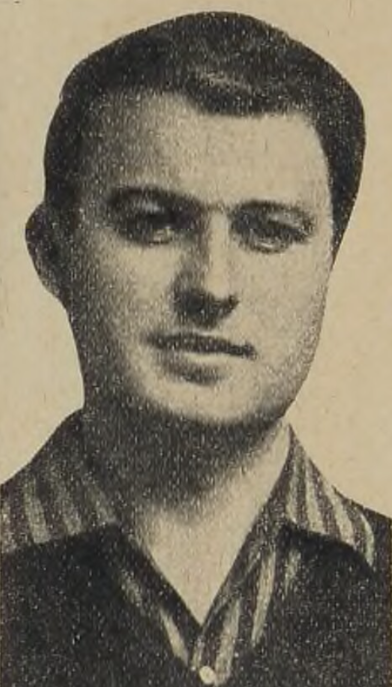
- 1963
- Born: 1 April 1935; Poříčí nad Sázavou
- Died: 15 June 2015 (aged 80); Prague
- Occupation: Playwright
- Relatives: Jáchym Topol (son); Filip Topol (son)

Josef Topol (1 April 1935 – 15 June 2015) was a Czech playwright.

== Biography ==
In 1965, he co-founded Divadlo za branou, a theatre in Prague which was closed in 1972 after being banned by Czechoslovak government. In 1977 he signed Charter 77.

He was married to Jiřina Topolová (1931–2016; daughter of Karel Schulz) and had two sons: Jáchym (* 1962) who is a writer and Filip (1965–2013) who was a leader of the band Psí vojáci.

Josef Topol died in Prague on 15 June 2015, at age of 80 .
