= Jachym =

Jachym is a masculine given name. Notable people with the name include:

- Jáchym Topol, Czech poet (born 1962)
- Joachim Barrande (1799–1883), French geologist and paleontologist
- Joachim Löw (born 1960), German soccer coach
