= Tereza Pergnerová =

Czech actress, singer and television presenter

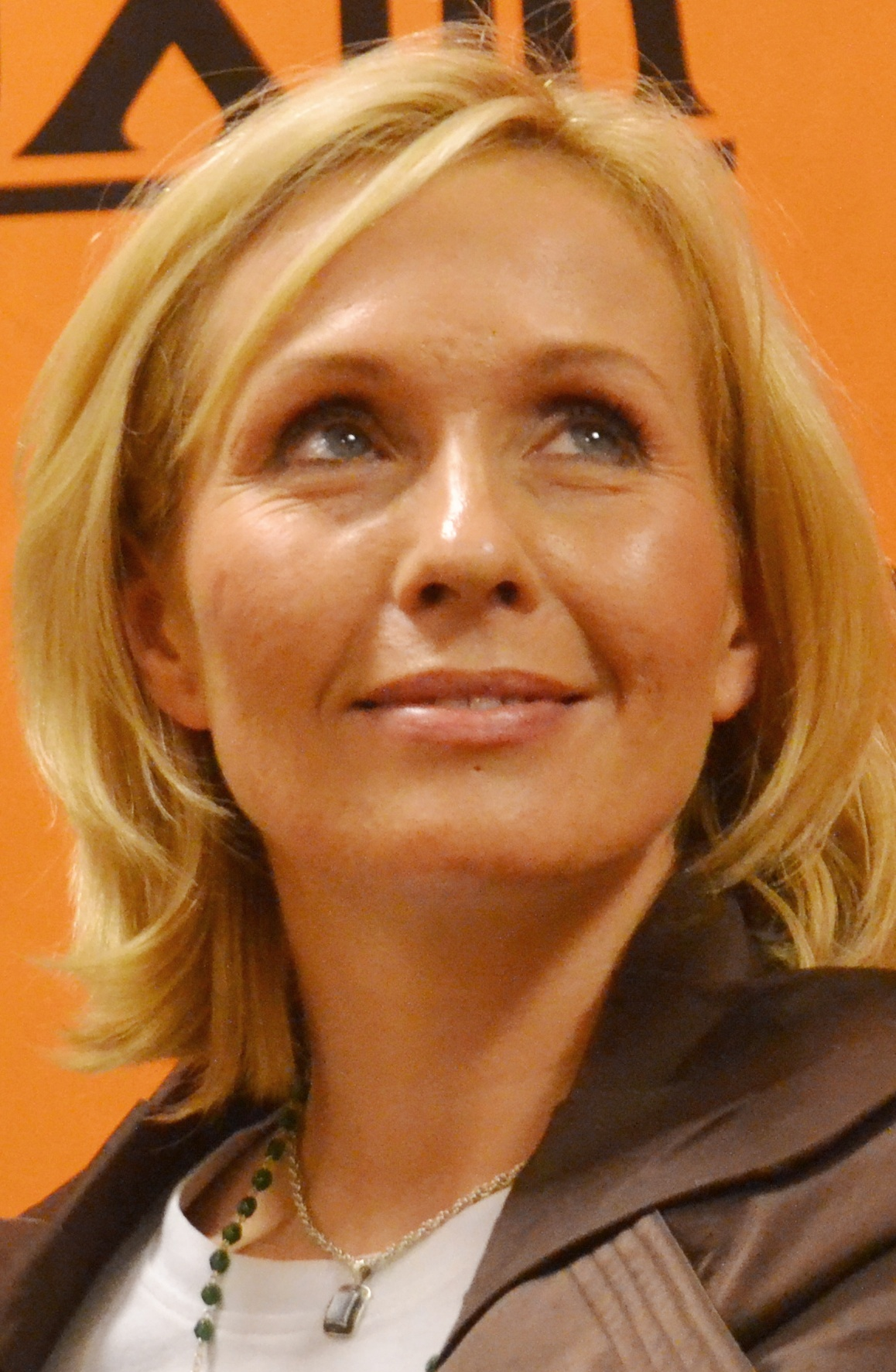
- Pergnerová in 2014
- Born: 25 June 1974 (age 52); Prague, Czechoslovakia
- Occupations: Actress, Singer
- Years active: 1989–present
- Children: 2

Tereza Pergnerová (born 25 June 1974) is a Czech actress, singer and television presenter. She presented the 2012 reality television show Farma. She has two children, having given birth to a son in 2000 and a daughter in 2008.

== Selected filmography ==
- Accumulator 1 (1991)
- Žiletky (1994)
