= Jáchym Topol =

Czech poet, novelist, musician, and journalist (born 1962)

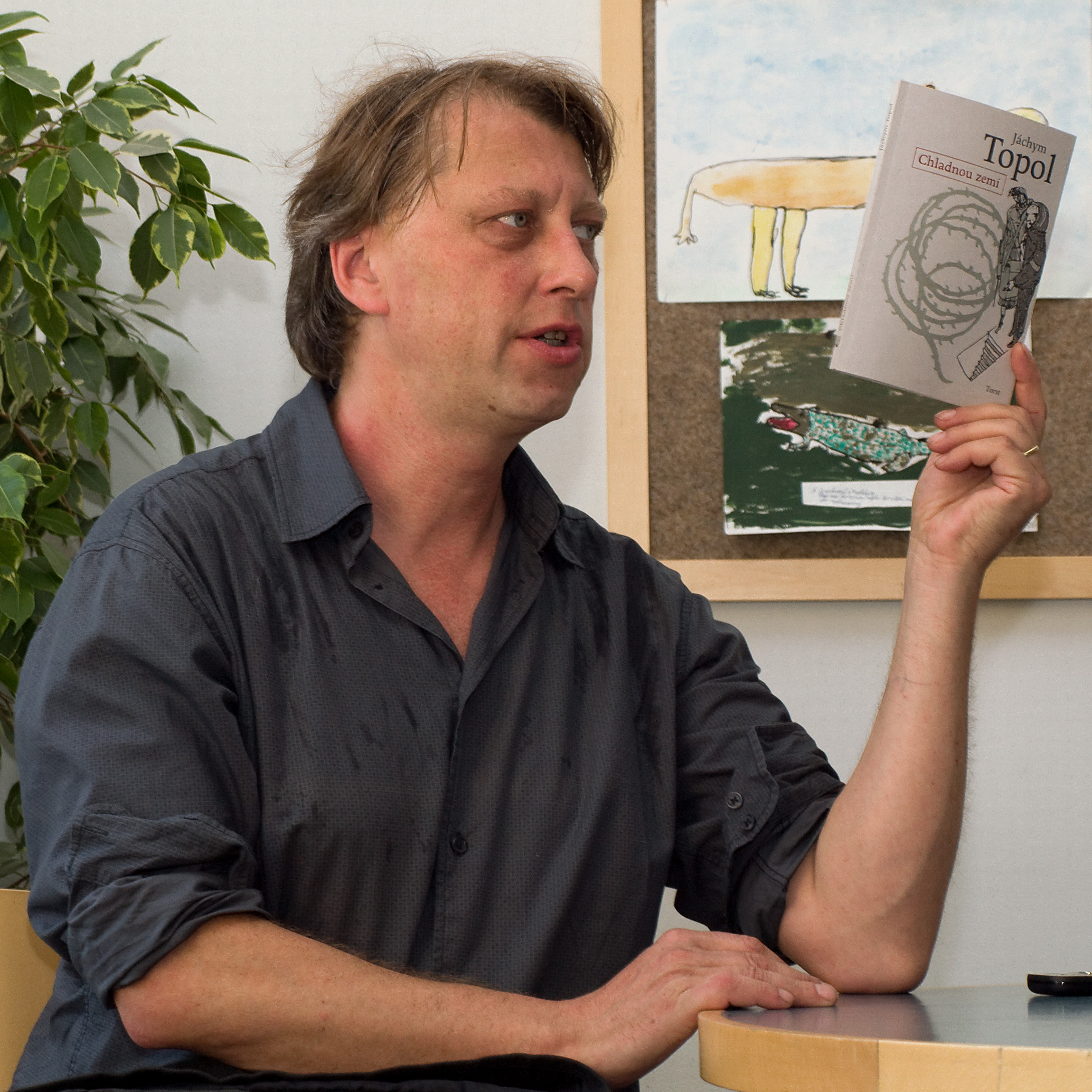
- Jáchym Topol with his book Chladnou zemí (September 2010)
- Born: 4 August 1962 (age 64); Prague
- Occupations: Journalist, novelist, poet
- Notable work: City Sister Silver
- Parent(s): Josef Topol and Jiřina Topolová
- Relatives: Filip Topol (brother)

Signature
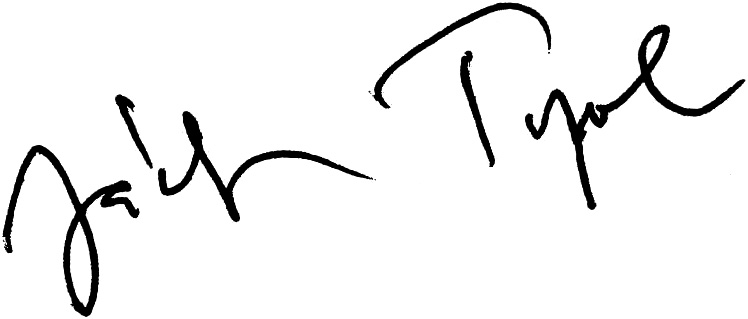

Jáchym Topol (born 4 August 1962) is a Czech poet, novelist, musician and journalist who became a laureate of the Czech State Award for Literature in October 2017 for his novel A Sensitive Person and his life work to date.

== Life ==
Jáchym Topol was born in Prague, Czechoslovakia, to Josef Topol, Czech playwright, poet, and translator of Shakespeare, and Jiřina Topolová, daughter of the famous Czech Catholic writer Karel Schulz.

Topol's writing began with lyrics for the rock band Psí vojáci, led by his younger brother, Filip, in the late '70s and early '80s. In 1982, he cofounded the samizdat magazine Violit, and in 1985 Revolver Revue, a samizdat review that specialized in modern Czech writing.

Because of his father's dissident activities, Topol was not allowed to go to university. After graduating from gymnasium he worked as a stoker, stocker, construction worker, and coal deliveryman. Several times he was imprisoned for short periods, both for his samizdat publishing activities and for his smuggling across the Polish border in cooperation with members of Polish Solidarity. He was also a signatory of the Charter 77 human rights declaration.

During the 1989 Velvet Revolution in Czechoslovakia, Topol wrote for the independent newsletter Informační servis, which later became the investigative weekly Respekt. He has also worked for the daily Lidové noviny. He currently works as program director for the Václav Havel Library in Prague.

Topol has two daughters, Josefína and Marie, with his first wife, and a son, Vojtěch Eliáš, with his second.

== Works ==
=== Poetry ===
- Eskymáckej pes (Eskimo dog) (samizdat, 1982)
- Stěhovavá tvář (Migratory face) (samizdat, 1983)
- Noty pro podzimní bytost (Notes for an autumn creature) (samizdat, 1984)
- Miluju tě k zbláznění (I love you madly; samizdat, 1988)
  / Topol's first collection of poetry, published in samizdat, received the Tom Stoppard Prize for Unofficial Literature (founded in 1983 by Tom Stoppard and awarded by the Charta 77 Foundation in Stockholm); first non-samizdat edition published by Atlantis in 1990. / translation Анжелина Пенчева (Anželina Penčeva): Обичам те до лудост, Парадокс, Sofie (2020, Bulgarian)
- V úterý bude válka (The war will be on Tuesday; Edice 13x18, 1992)
  / Five poems from this collection were published in Alex Zucker's translation in the Spring 1994 issue of Trafika: an international literary review.
- Děsivý spřežení (Horrifying dog team) (Revolver Revue, 2016) – selection of poems from three samizdat collections plus the short story Venezuela.
- Udržuj svou ledničku plnou. Písňové texty a zhudebněné básně 1979-2021 (Keep your refrigerator full: Song lyrics and poems set to music, 1979-2021) (Torst, 2021)

=== Novels ===
- Sestra (Sister; Atlantis, 1994)
  / Received the 1995 Cena Egona Hostovského (Egon Hostovský Prize), awarded for a "novel which artistically exceeds the standard production"
  / English translation Alex Zucker: City Sister Silver (Catbird Press, 2000)
  / Polish translation Leszek Engelking: Siostra (Wydawnictwo W.A.B., 2002)
  / Also translated into German and Hungarian
- Anděl (Angel; Hynek, 1995)
  / German translation Peter Sacher: Engel Exit (Volk und Welt, 1997)
  / French translation Marianna Canavaggio: Ange exit (J'ai lu, 2002)
  / Turkish translation Martin Alaçam: Andel (Norgunk, 2005)
  / Also translated into Hungarian
- Noční práce (Nightwork; Hynek, 2001)
  / French translation Marianna Canavaggio: Missions nocturnes (Laffont, 2002)
  / Polish translation Leszek Engelking: Nocna praca (Wydawnictwo W.A.B., 2004)
  / English translation Marek Tomin: Nightwork (Portobello Books, 2014)
  / Also translated into Croatian, Dutch, German, Italian, Spanish and Swedish
- Kloktat dehet (Gargling tar; Torst, 2005)
  / French translation Marianna Canavaggio: Zone cirque (Editions Noir Sur Blanc, 2009)
  / Polish translation Leszek Engelking: Strefa cyrkowa (Wydawnictwo W.A.B., 2008)
  / English translation David Short: Gargling with Tar (Portobello Books, 2010)
  / Also translated into Dutch, German, Italian, Norwegian.
- Chladnou zemí (Through a chilly land; Torst, 2009)
  / Received the 2010 Cena Jaroslava Seiferta
  / Swedish translation Tora Hedin: Kallt land (Ersatz, 2009) ISBN 978-91-88858-95-5
  / Dutch translation Edgar de Bruin: De werkplaats van de duivel (Anthos, 2010)
  / Italian translation Letizia Kostner: L'officina del diavolo (Zandonai, 2012) ISBN 978-88-95538-83-9
  / English translation Alex Zucker: The Devil's Workshop (Portobello Books, 2013)
- Citlivý člověk (A Sensitive Person; Torst, 2017)
  / Received the State Prize for Literature in 2017 for this novel and his life work to date
  / Polish translation Dorota Dobrew: Wrażliwy człowiek, wydawnictwo czarne, Sękowa (2019)
  / German translation Eva Profousová: Ein empfindsamer Mensch, Suhrkamp (2019)
  / Italian translation Laura Angeloni: Una persona sensibile, Keller editore, Rovereto (2020)
  / Dutch translation Edgar de Bruin: Een gevoelig iemand, Uitgeverij Voetnoot, Antwerpen (2020, )
  / Macedonian translation Соња Стојменска-Елзесер (Sonja Stojmenska-Elzeser): Чувствителен човек, Артконект, Skopje (2020)
  / French translation Marianne Canavaggio: Une personne sensible, Noir sur Blanc Lausanne (2021)
  / Serbian translation Uroš Nikolić: Osetljivi čovek, Heliks, Beograd (2021)
  / Lithuanian translation Vaida Braškyté Němečková: Jautrus žmogus, Aukso žuvys, Vilnius (2021)
  / Croatian translation Mirna Stehlíková Đurasek: Osjetljiv čovjek, V.B.Z., Zagreb (2022) / Swedish translation Marie Wenger: En Känslig Själ, Rámus förlag, Malmö (2022) / English translation Alex Zucker: A Sensitive Person, Yale University Press (2022)
- Peklo neexistuje (Hell does not exist; Torst, 2026)

=== Novellas ===
- Výlet k nádražní hale (Outing to the train station concourse; Edice Slza, 1994, limited edition of 350)
  / English translation Alex Zucker: A Trip to the Train Station (Petrov, 1995; Albatros Plus, 2011; Czech-English bilingual edition)

=== Short stories ===
- Zlatá hlava (Golden head; Torst, 2005)
- Supermarket sovětských hrdinů (Supermarket of Soviet heroes; Torst, 2007)
- Trochu Medu (A Little Honey), full text (The Short Story Project)

=== Plays ===
- Cesta do Bugulmy (Road to Bugulma) (Svět a divadlo no. 4, 2006)

Productions:

staged reading: Divadlo v Dlouhé Praha, režie: Karel Král, premiéra 23. 1. 2007
production: Divadlo Na zábradlí Praha, režie: Jiří Pokorný, premiere 15 June 2007

German translation Eva Profousová: Die Reise nach Bugulma, henschel SCHAUSPIEL (2006)
Polish translation Leszek Engelking: Droga do Bugulmy, Dialog no. 11 (2005), wydawnictwo czarne (2006)

=== Literary reports ===
- Zabitý idol Václav Švéda (The murdered idol Václav Švéda; Respekt Special IV/2015)
  / English translation Anthony Bartos: Václav Švéda, the murdered idol (cardandcube, 2023)

=== Translations ===
- Trnová dívka (Thorn girl; Hynek, 1997)
  / A collection of Native American legends and myths, selected and translated into Czech from English by Topol

=== Song lyrics ===
- Psí vojáci: Sestra: Jáchym Topol & Psí Vojáci (1994)
- Monika Načeva: Možnosti tu sou (There are possibilities here; 1994)
- Monika Načeva: Nebe je rudý (The sky is red; 1996)
- Monika Načeva: Mimoid (Weirdo; 1998)

=== Films ===
- Anděl Exit (Angel Exit; 2000), directed by Vladimír Michálek; screenplay by Vladimír Michálek and Jáchym Topol.
- Sestra (Sister; 2008), directed by Vít Pancíř; screenplay by Vít Pancíř based on the novel by Jáchym Topol; music by Psí vojáci.
- Citlivý člověk (A Sensitive Person, 2023), directed by Tomáš Klein

=== Other ===
- Nemůžu se zastavit (I can't stand still; Portál, 2000)
  / A book-length interview with Topol by Tomáš Weiss

== Awards and honors ==
- 1995 – Egon Hostovský Prize for City Sister Silver
- 2010 – Jaroslav Seifert Prize for The Devil's Workshop
- 2015 – Vilenica Prize
- 2017 – Czech State Award for Literature for A Sensitive Person and life work to date
- 2026 – Medal of Merit for services to the state in the field of arts.
