= Krvavý román =

- Directed by: Jaroslav Brabec
- Written by: Jaroslav Brabec, Josef Váchal
- Produced by: Jan Šuster
- Cinematography: Jaroslav Brabec
- Edited by: Jiří Brožek
- Music by: Jiří Šust
- Release date: 6 May 1993
- Running time: 99
- Country: Czechoslovakia
- Language: czech

Krvavý román (int. English title 'Horror Story') is a 1993 Czech film by Jaroslav Brabec. The film stars Josef Kemr.

The film is based on Josef Váchal's 1924 novel of the same title.
