= Discopříběh =

1987 film

- Film poster
- Directed by: Jaroslav Soukup
- Written by: Eduard Pergner; Jaroslav Soukup
- Starring: Rudolf Hrušínský III
- Edited by: Jiří Brožek
- Music by: Michal David
- Release date: 1987
- Running time: 82 minutes
- Country: Czechoslovakia
- Language: Czech

Discopříběh (English: Disco Story) is a 1987 Czechoslovak musical film written and directed by Jaroslav Soukup. It starred Rudolf Hrušínský III, the grandson of actor Rudolf Hrušínský. The songs in the film were performed by Michal David.

== Plot ==
Chimney sweep apprentice Jirka Horáček lives with his widowed father on a housing estate in Plzeň. He spends his free time with his friend Roman at discotheques. During one night out, he meets an attractive blonde, Eva, and a quiet hairdresser, Jitka. Jirka falls in love with Eva, though Eva already has a boyfriend, the slightly older Cáfa. In an effort to win Eva over and prove that he is better than Cáfa, Jirka does silly things such as running around the town square naked, kissing Eva in front of a security camera, and inviting Cáfa to a luxury restaurant and sneaking out with Eva before payment.

Jirka eventually loses Eva after she discovers he was lying to her about being an airplane mechanic. Distraught, Jirka gets his head shaved by Jitka. Cáfa also beats up Jirka after Jirka did not pay back the restaurant bill. Afterwards, Jirka has an argument with his father and runs away from home. Jirka lives as a vagrant, secretly entering his house to get food, but he is eventually discovered by his father and the two reconcile. Jirka also realizes that Jitka, not Eva, really likes him.

== Cast ==
- Rudolf Hrušínský III as Jirka
- Ladislav Potměšil as Jirka's father
- Mariana Slováková as Eva
- Jaroslava Stránská as Jitka
- Roman Pikl as Roman
- Andrej Kraus as Cáfa
- Jana Krausová as Jirka's mother

== Sequel ==
A sequel, Discopříběh 2, was released in 1991, in which Jirka's father is the problematic member of the family.
