= Poříčí nad Sázavou =

- Municipality
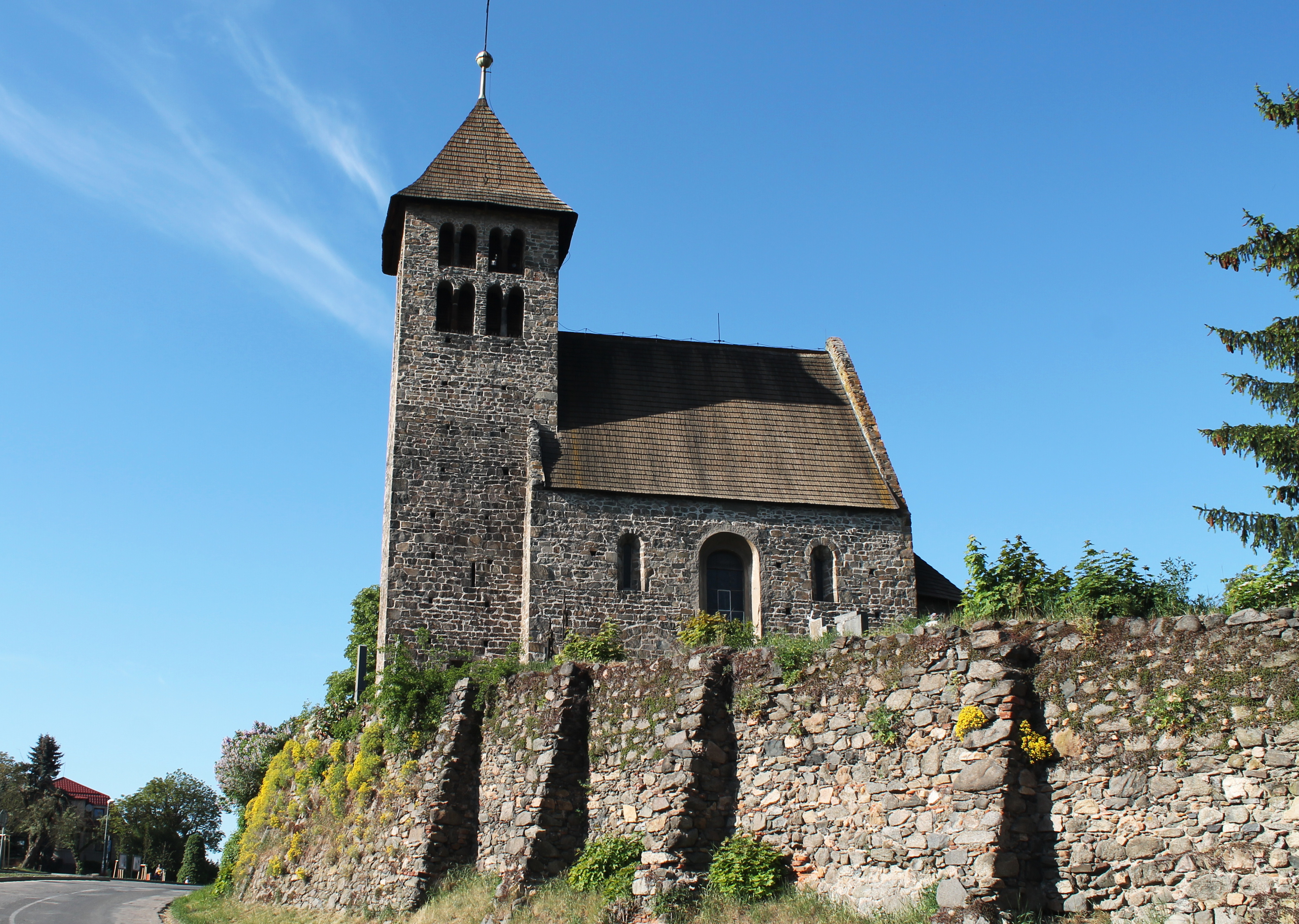
- Church of Saint Peter

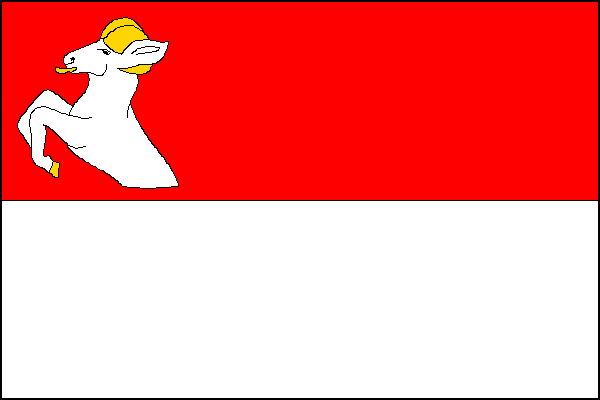
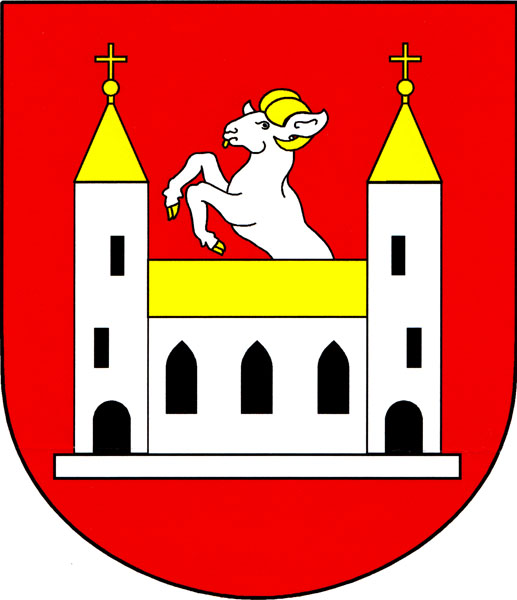
- Flag Coat of arms

- Location in the Czech Republic
- Coordinates: 49°50′20″N 14°40′28″E
- Country: Czech Republic
- Region: Central Bohemian
- District: Benešov
- First mentioned: 1351

Area
  - Total: 9.27 km^{2} (3.58 sq mi)
- Elevation: 284 m (932 ft)

Population (2026-01-01)
  - Total: 1,661
  - Density: 179/km^{2} (464/sq mi)
- Time zone: UTC+1 (CET)
  - Summer (DST): UTC+2 (CEST)
- Postal codes: 257 21, 257 22
- Website: www.poricinadsazavou.cz

Poříčí nad Sázavou (Czech pronunciation: [ˈpor̝iːtʃiː ˈnat saːzavou]) is a municipality and village in Benešov District in the Central Bohemian Region of the Czech Republic. It has about 1,700 inhabitants. The municipality is located on the Sázava River in the Benešov Uplands. Poříčí nad Sázavou is known for a pair of Romanesque churches.

== Administrative division ==
Poříčí nad Sázavou consists of two municipal parts (in brackets population according to the 2021 census):

- Poříčí nad Sázavou (1,384)
- Hvozdec (110)

== Etymology ==
The Czech word poříčí (from po řece = 'along the river') is a general term for an area near a river. The suffix nad Sázavou means 'upon the Sázava'.

== Geography ==
Poříčí nad Sázavou is located about 6 kilometres (4 mi) north of Benešov and 25 km (16 mi) southeast of Prague. It lies in the Benešov Uplands. The highest point is the hill Chocholouš at 388 m (1,273 ft) above sea level. The Sázava River flows through the municipality.

== History ==
The first written mention of Poříčí nad Sázavou is from 1351.

== Demographics ==
Historical population

Year	Pop.	±%
1869	866	—
1880	860	−0.7%
1890	865	+0.6%
1900	790	−8.7%
1910	913	+15.6%

Year	Pop.	±%
1921	891	−2.4%
1930	989	+11.0%
1950	980	−0.9%
1961	1,050	+7.1%
1970	1,036	−1.3%

Year	Pop.	±%
1980	945	−8.8%
1991	968	+2.4%
2001	974	+0.6%
2011	1,218	+25.1%
2021	1,494	+22.7%

Source: Censuses

== Transport ==
The I/3 road (part of the European route E55), which connects the D1 motorway with Tábor and further continues as the D3 motorway, runs through Poříčí nad Sázavou.

== Sights ==
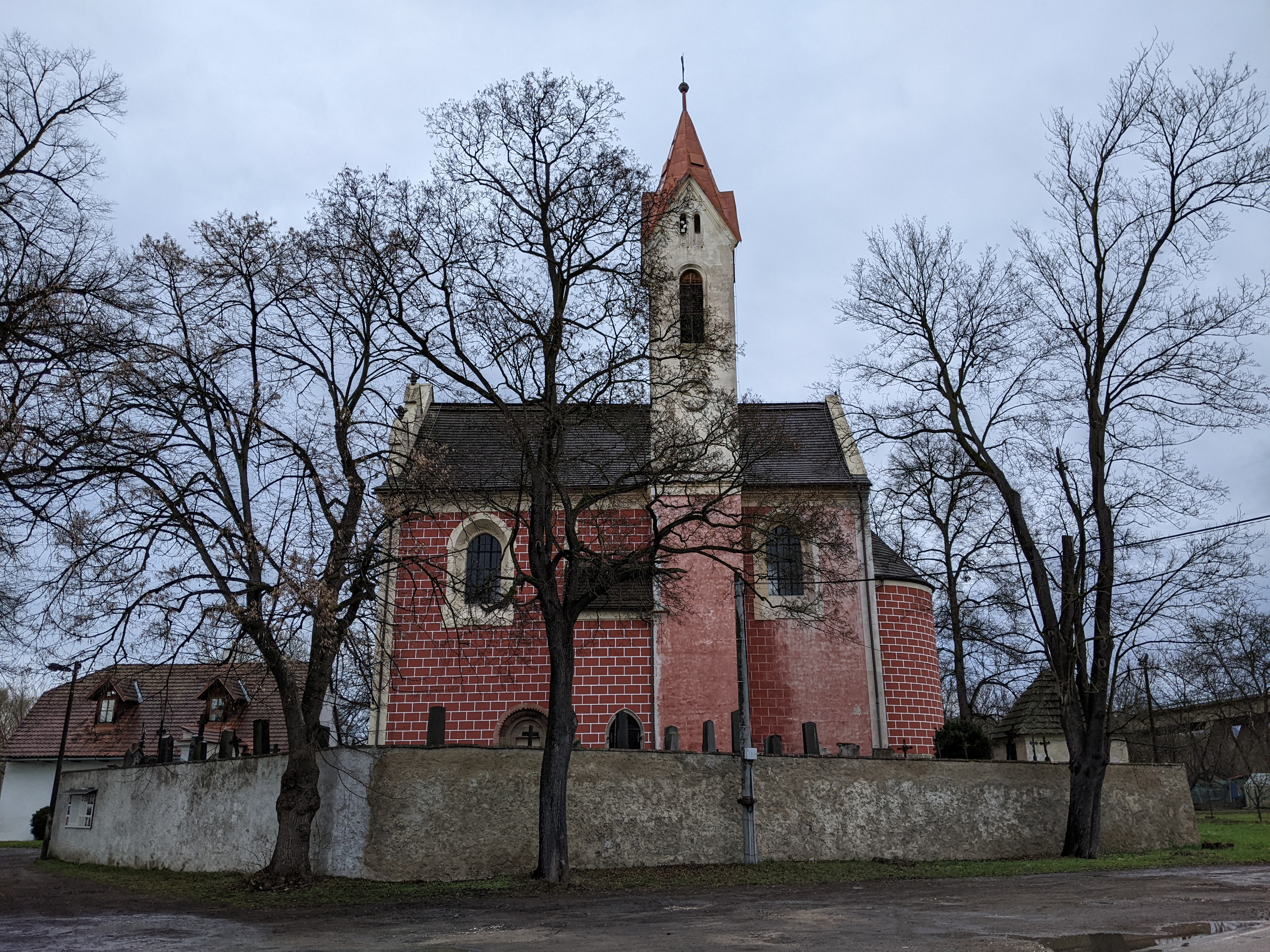
Church of Saint Gall

Poříčí nad Sázavou is known for two valuable Romanesque churches. The Church of Saint Peter probably dates from the mid-12th century and was restored in 1677. The Church of Saint Gall was built in the mid-13th century. Gothic and Baroque modifications took place after 1620 and in 1745.

== Notable people ==
- Josef Topol (1935–2015), playwright
