= Miroslav Vaic =

Czech screenwriter (1946–2025)

- Born: 14 September 1946; Klatovy, Czechoslovakia
- Died: 24 May 2025 (aged 78); Czech Republic
- Education: Academy of Performing Arts in Prague
- Occupations: Screenwriter, playwright, journalist

Miroslav Vaic (14 September 1946 – 24 May 2025) was a Czech screenwriter, radio playwright and journalist.

== Life and career ==
Vaic was born in Klatovy on 14 September 1946. He graduated from the Secondary School of Mechanical Engineering in Plzeň. From 1965 to 1967 he completed his mandatory military service. From 1970 to 1975 he studied screenwriting and dramaturgy at FAMU. For sixteen years he was a screenwriter and dramaturge at the Barrandov Film Studios. From 1991 to 1995 he worked as a journalist.

Vaic died on 24 May 2025, at the age of 78.

== Selected filmography ==
His work include:

- Vítr v kapse (1982)
- Svatba upírů (1993)
- Byl jednou jeden polda (1995)
