= Všichni musí být v pyžamu =

- Directed by: Jaroslav Papoušek
- Screenplay by: Jaroslav Papoušek, Vlastimil Venclík
- Cinematography: Ivan Šlapeta
- Edited by: Jiří Brožek
- Music by: Karel Mareš
- Production company: Barrandov Studios
- Release date: 1984
- Running time: 77 minutes
- Country: Czechoslovakia

Všichni musí být v pyžamu is a 1984 Czechoslovak film directed by Jaroslav Papoušek. The film starred František Husák and Josef Kemr.

The hero of the film is found rushing from one misfortune to another, he is the former accountant Gregory Maršíček, who, after a heart attack, for fear of dying, decides to live a quiet, sparing life and adhere to the principles of healthy living. These are not to smoke, drink, and to exercise and eat healthily. He will take the place of the patient's inspector and hopes he will have peace of mind in his new job. Instead, he experiences one nervous episode after another. Gradually his will power dwindles. Gregory falls into unhealthy food, alcohol, and women. Things gradually get worse. The result is a second heart attack, after which the hero promises to fix everything and live healthily.
