= Byl jednou jeden polda =

1995 film

- DVD cover
- Directed by: Jaroslav Soukup
- Written by: Miroslav Vaic, Jaroslav Vokřál, Jaroslav Soukup
- Produced by: Jaroslav Soukup
- Starring: Ladislav Potměšil; Rudolf Hrušínský; Simona Krainová
- Cinematography: Vladimír Holomek
- Edited by: Ivana Kačírková
- Music by: Zdeněk Barták
- Distributed by: nový oceán, spol. s r. o., OCEAN FILM s.r.o., Astra Film
- Release date: 2 February 1995
- Running time: 83 minutes
- Country: Czech Republic
- Language: Czech

Byl jednou jeden polda is a Czech comedy film directed by Jaroslav Soukup. It was released in 1995.

== Cast and characters ==
- Ladislav Potměšil - Major Maisner
- Rudolf Hrušínský - Robert
- Simona Krainová - Captain of FBI
- Petra Martincová - Boženka
- Tomáš Matonoha - Štefan
- Miroslav Moravec - Deputy Minister of Interior
- Jaroslav Sypal - Hrubec

== Plot ==
Commander of Police academy, major Václav Maisner, introduces a new training method entitled "school game", inspired by American movie series Police Academy. By Deputy Minister of Interior is he informed, that he had incognito in academy an agent of FBI. He is decided, discover, which recruit is that FBI agent.
