= City Sister Silver =

1994 novel by Jáchym Topol

- Author: Jáchym Topol
- Original title: Sestra
- Translator: Alex Zucker
- Language: Czech
- Publication date: 1994

City Sister Silver (Original: Sestra) is a 1994 novel by Czech author Jáchym Topol. It was translated by Alex Zucker and published by Catbird Press in 2000.

The Czech original was described by Czech writer Ivan Klíma as "a first attempt at expressing, in a profound and extremely individual way, the feelings of an entire generation," with the central character Potok in a sense embodying the simultaneous feelings of alienation and enormous possibilities of a young adult at the time of the Velvet Revolution and its aftermath.

This is a complex, frequently dark, and often deliberately confusing, novel, with the English translation described by Samuel Thomas as "a difficult experience for a reader unfamiliar with Czech culture [but] beautiful [ . . .] and consistently inventive."

By all accounts, the Czech original is no less challenging or inventive, with Topol making the most of new freedoms to play fast and loose with the conventional rules of written Czech, to the extent that the original was issued with a disclaimer stating the author's intent to "capture language in its unsystematicness and out-of-jointness."
