= Vaic =

Vaic (feminine: Vaicová) is a Czech and Slovak surname. Notable people with the surname include:

- Ľubomír Vaic (born 1977), Slovak ice hockey player
- Miroslav Vaic (1946–2025), Czech screenwriter, radio playwright and journalist
