= Klára Issová =

Czech actress

Klara Issova
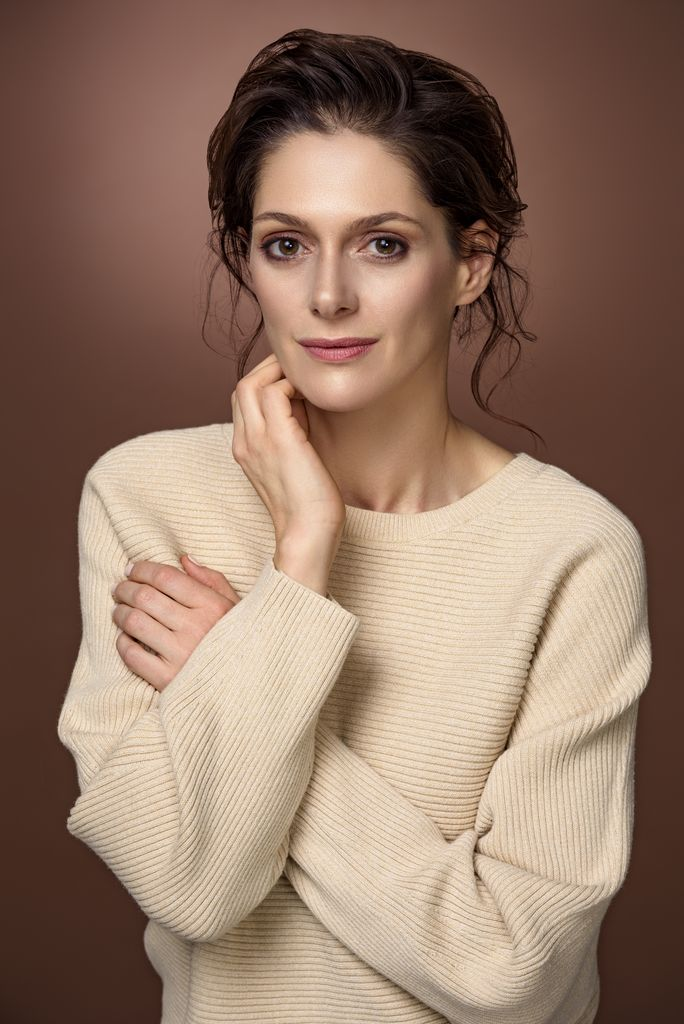
- Klára Issová
- Born: 26 April 1979 (age 47); Prague, Czechoslovakia, now Czech Republic
- Occupation: Actress
- Years active: 1994–present
- Website: www.klaraissova.cz

Klára Issová (born 26 April 1979), sometimes known as Klára Issa, is a Czech-Syrian film, stage and television actress. In 1997, she won the Czech Lion Award for Best Supporting Actress in Nejasná zpráva o konci světa. She is the cousin of actress Martha Issová.

== Early life ==
Born in Prague in 1979, she is the daughter of a Czech mother and Syrian director Michel Issa. In 1985, at the age of six, she started taking drama lessons. In 1993, she studied at the Prague Conservatory, graduating in 1997. She continued to act in the school theatre for another two years while studying pedagogy.

== Career ==
Issova has appeared in many films, TV serials and plays. Her notable film appearances are in Indian Summer (1995), The Mists of Avalon (2001), Frank Herbert's Children of Dune (2003), and Surviving Life (2010). She also played a short role in the movie The Chronicles of Narnia: Prince Caspian (2008). In 2000, for the movie Angel Exit, she had her head shaved bald onscreen. She was nominated for Czech Lion Awards for best actress in 2000 for the same movie. Her noteworthy TV appearances are in No Problem (1997), Joan of Arc (1999), Anne Frank: The Whole Story (2001), and Operace Silver A (2007). Her stage credits include in Shots in Broadway and Private Eye.

== Filmography ==
- Zrada (TV series)
- Resistance (2020) .... Judith
- Tichý společník (2020) .... Lenka
- Případ mrtvého nebožtíka (2020)
- Specialisté (2019) (TV)
- Happy Birthday, My Love (short) (2019) .... Veronika
- Pražské orgie (2019) .... Eva Kalinová
- Zoufalé ženy dělají zoufalé věci (2018) .... Olga
- Interlude in Prague (2017) .... Fraulein Ribber
- Všechno nebo nic (2017) .... Vanda
- Genius (2017) (TV) .... Marie Curie
- Angel of the Lord 2 (2016) .... Virgin Mary
- The Truth Commissioner (2016) .... Krystal
- Legends (2015) (TV) .... Ilyana (season 2)
- Killing Jesus (2015) .... Mary Magdalene
- The Last Knights (2014) .... Lt. Cortez’s Wife
- Zejtra napořád (2014) .... Jana
- Nosferatu in Love (Short) (2014) .... Luna
- Škoda lásky 2014 .... Hrdina
- Crossing Lines (2013) (TV) .... Shari
- Nicky's Family (2011)
- Surviving Life (2010)) .... Evzenie
- Jménem krále (2009) .... Ludmila of Vartemberk
- První krok (2009) TV series .... Adela Berger
- Soukromé pasti (2008) TV series .... Natalie (episode 01x08 Stolem sperm)
- The Chronicles of Narnia: Prince Caspian (2008) .... Hag
- The Wrong Mr. Johnson (2008) .... Veronika
- Medvídek (2007) .... Ema
- Operace Silver A (2007) (TV) .... Hana Kroupová
- Rules of Lies (film) (2006) .... Monika
- Grandhotel (2006) .... Ilja
- Angel of the Lord (2005) .... Virgin Maria
- Všichni musí zemřít (2005) .... Tereza
- In nomine patris (2004) .... Marie
- The Prince & Me (2004) .... English Teacher's Assistant
- O svatební krajce (2003) (TV) .... Princess Svatava
- Vrah jsi ty (2003) (TV) .... Dorotka
- Frank Herbert's Children of Dune (2003) .... Lichna
- Cesta byla suchá, místy mokrá (2003) (TV) .... Hanka
- Most (2003) .... Pavlínka
- Kočky (2003) (TV) ....
- Rose and Maloney (2002) TV series .... Vanda Berkova {episode #2.1 (2005)}
- Múza je hrůza (2001) .... Muse/Jana
- Ratten - Sie werden dich kriegen (2001) (TV)
- Královská slib (2001) .... Princess
- The Mists of Avalon (2001) .... Raven
- Anne Frank: The Whole Story (2001) (TV) .... Janny Brandes-Brilslijper
- Bez tváře (2001) ....
- Frank Herbert's Dune (2000) .... Servant Girl
- Angel Exit (2000) .... Kája
- Touching Pictures (2000) ....
- Inferno (2000) .... Naďa
- Na zámku (2000) (TV) .... Olga
- In the Rye (1999) TV series
- Joan of Arc (1999) (TV) .... Michael's Wife
- Nejasná zpráva o konci světa (1997) .... Veronika
- Asi už to začalo (1997) .... Marie
- No Problem (1997) TV mini-series ....
- Sad (1996) .... Andulka
- Indian Summer (1995) .... Klára
- Když se slunci nedaří (1995) TV series .... Markéta Šnajberková (as Klára Issa)

== Theatre ==
=== Divadlo Pod Palmovkou ===
- The Handmaids .... Claire (Jeann Genet)
- Shots on Broadway .... Ellen
- Amadeus .... Constance (Peter Shaffer)
- Ubohý vrah .... Anna (Pavel Kohout)
- View from the Bridge .... Catherine
- Private Eye .... Belinda
- Kean .... Anna Dambi (Jean-Paul Sartre)
- Closer .... ??? (Patrick Marber)
- Dragon's Lair .... ??? (Viliam Klimacek)

=== Divadlo v Řeznické ===
- Private Eye .... Belinda

=== Palace Theatre ===
- Líbánky .... Sibylla Chase (Noël Coward)
