= Podbořany =

- Town
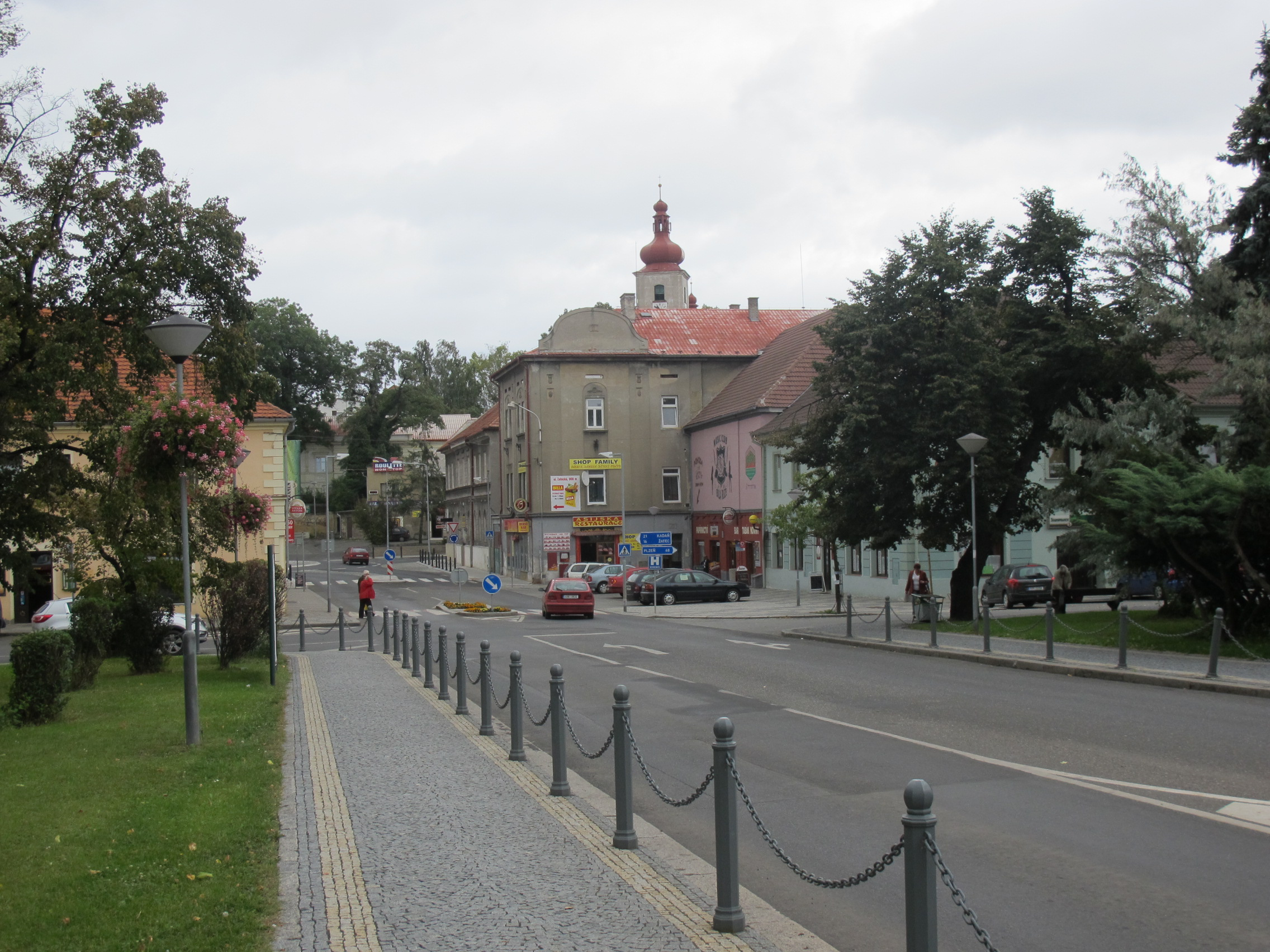
- Town square

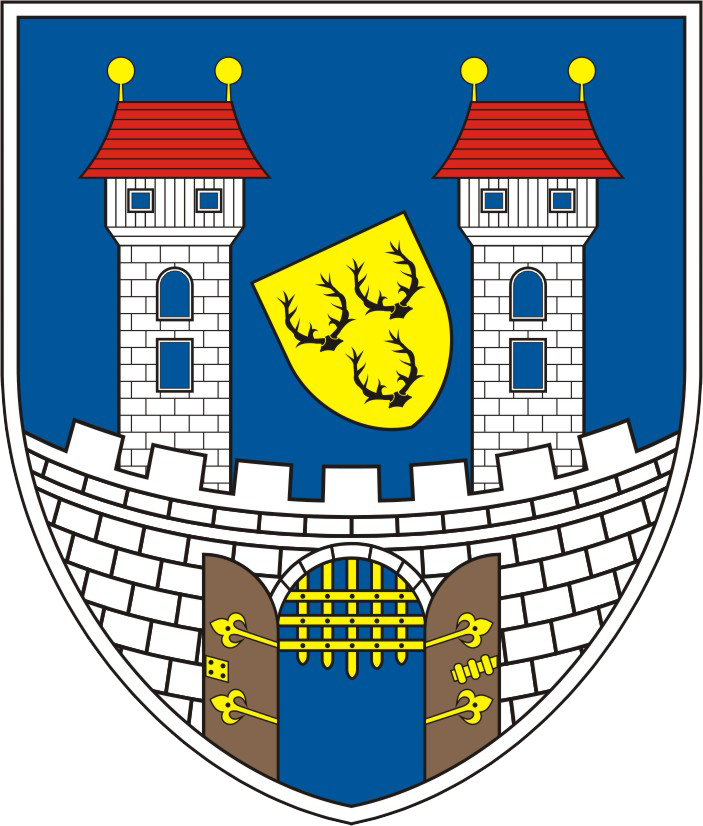
- Flag Coat of arms

- Location in the Czech Republic
- Coordinates: 50°13′34″N 13°24′38″E
- Country: Czech Republic
- Region: Ústí nad Labem
- District: Louny
- First mentioned: 1362

Government
  - Mayor: Ivo Švarc

Area
  - Total: 60.15 km^{2} (23.22 sq mi)
- Elevation: 320 m (1,050 ft)

Population (2026-01-01)
  - Total: 6,254
  - Density: 104.0/km^{2} (269.3/sq mi)
- Time zone: UTC+1 (CET)
  - Summer (DST): UTC+2 (CEST)
- Postal codes: 438 01, 441 01
- Website: www.podborany.net

Podbořany (Czech pronunciation: [ˈpodbor̝anɪ]; German: Podersam) is a town in Louny District in the Ústí nad Labem Region of the Czech Republic. It has about 6,300 inhabitants. The town proper is located on the stream Dolánecký potok in the Most Basin and is known for producing hops.

Podbořany became a town in 1575. The main landmark of the town is the Church of Saints Peter and Paul.

== Administrative division ==
Podbořany consists of 13 municipal parts (in brackets population according to the 2021 census):

- Podbořany (4,938)
- Buškovice (380)
- Dolánky (17)
- Hlubany (383)
- Kaštice (61)
- Kněžice (92)
- Letov (146)
- Mory (58)
- Neprobylice (6)
- Oploty (20)
- Pšov (77)
- Sýrovice (107)
- Valov (30)

== Etymology ==
The name Podbořany is derived from the Czech words pod borem ('below a pine forest') and podbořan (person living below a pine forest). So Podbořany denoted the village of such people.

== Geography ==
Podbořany is located about 31 kilometres (19 mi) southwest of Louny and 38 km (24 mi) east of Karlovy Vary. It lies mostly in the Most Basin, but a small western part of the municipal territory extends into the Doupov Mountains and includes the highest point of Podbořany at 460 m (1,509 ft) above sea level. The stream Dolánecký potok flows through the town.

== History ==
According to archaeological research, Slavic tribes lived here before the 10th century, and there was an important Slavic gord on the nearby Rubín hill. Some researchers even identify Rubín with the mythical Wogastisburg, which was the scene of the Battle of Wogastisburg.

The first written mention of Podbořany is in a deed of the monastery in Postoloprty from 1362. The village was owned by the monastery until 1426, when it was bought by the Lords of Gutštejn. During their rule, Podbořany became a market town. In 1575, as a property of the Schlick family, Podbořany received town rights.

During the 16th century, the Germanisation of Podbořany started. After the Thirty Years' War, Germans became a majority. In 1945–1946, the German population was expelled and they were partially replaced by Czechs from Volhynia.

== Demographics ==
Historical population

| Year | Pop. | ±% |
|---|---|---|
| 1869 | 5,221 | — |
| 1880 | 6,270 | +20.1% |
| 1890 | 6,597 | +5.2% |
| 1900 | 7,345 | +11.3% |
| 1910 | 7,846 | +6.8% |

| Year | Pop. | ±% |
|---|---|---|
| 1921 | 7,641 | −2.6% |
| 1930 | 8,289 | +8.5% |
| 1950 | 5,792 | −30.1% |
| 1961 | 5,851 | +1.0% |
| 1970 | 5,723 | −2.2% |

| Year | Pop. | ±% |
|---|---|---|
| 1980 | 5,917 | +3.4% |
| 1991 | 5,913 | −0.1% |
| 2001 | 6,112 | +3.4% |
| 2011 | 6,453 | +5.6% |
| 2021 | 6,315 | −2.1% |

Source: Censuses

== Economy ==
Podbořany was historically known for the mining of kaolin and the production of porcelain. Today it is one of the centres of hops cultivation.

== Transport ==
The I/27 road (the section from Plzeň to Most) passes through the eastern part of the municipal territory.

Podbořany is located on the railway line Plzeň–Most.

== Sights ==
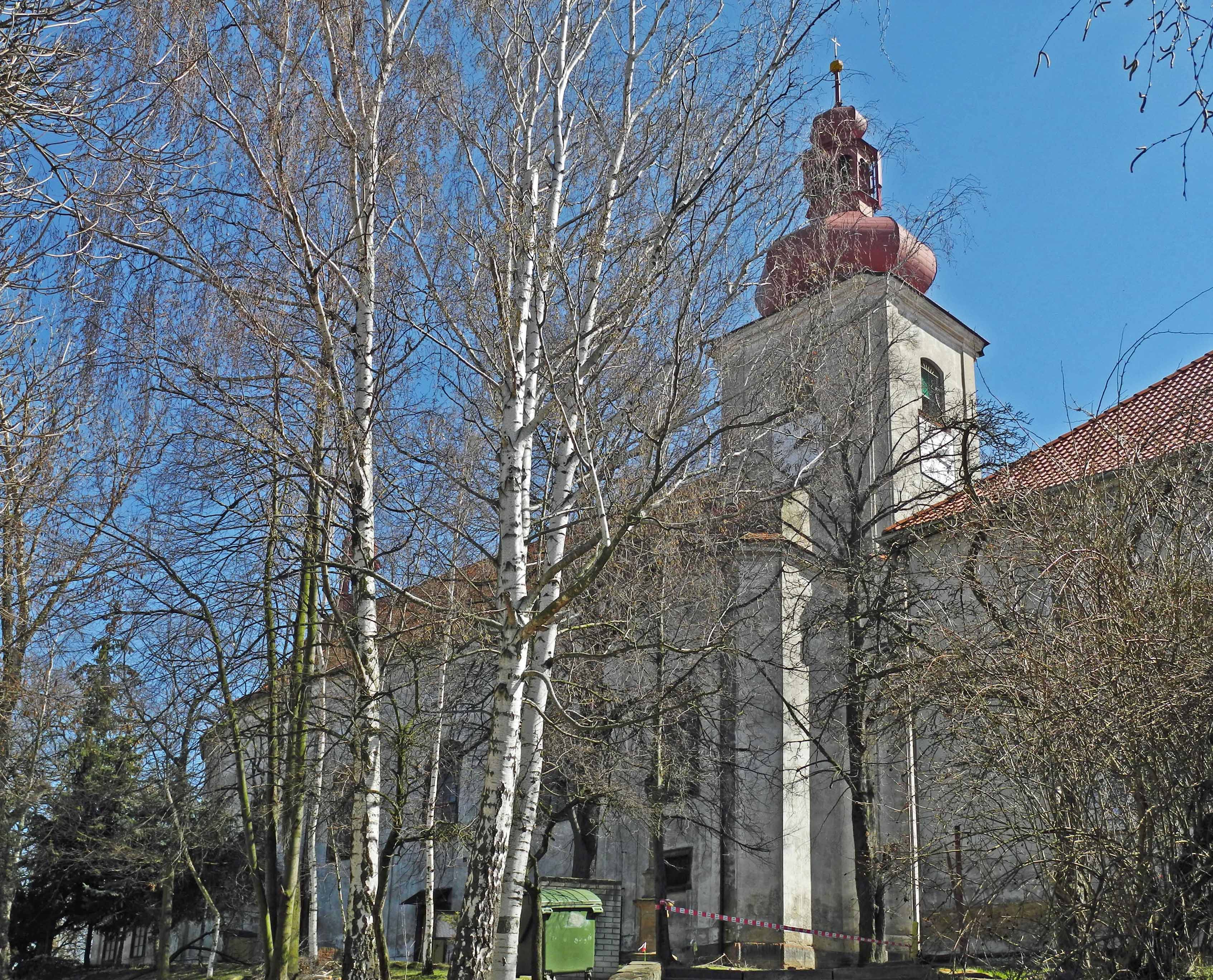
Church of Saints Peter and Paul

The Church of Saints Peter and Paul is a late Baroque building from 1781. Next to the church is a rectory from 1788.

The Church of the Savior was built by German Lutherans living in and around Podbořany in 1901–1902. Today the pseudo-Romanesque building serves mainly cultural purposes.

== Notable people ==
- Radomil Eliška (1931–2019), conductor
- Stanislav Štech (born 1954), politician and psychologist
- Jan Pelc (born 1957), writer
- Mikael Kubista (born 1961), Czech-Swedish chemist

== Twin towns – sister cities ==
Podbořany is twinned with:

- Ehrenfriedersdorf, Germany
- Russi, Italy
- Spalt, Germany
