= Filip Topol =

Czech musician and writer (1965–2013)

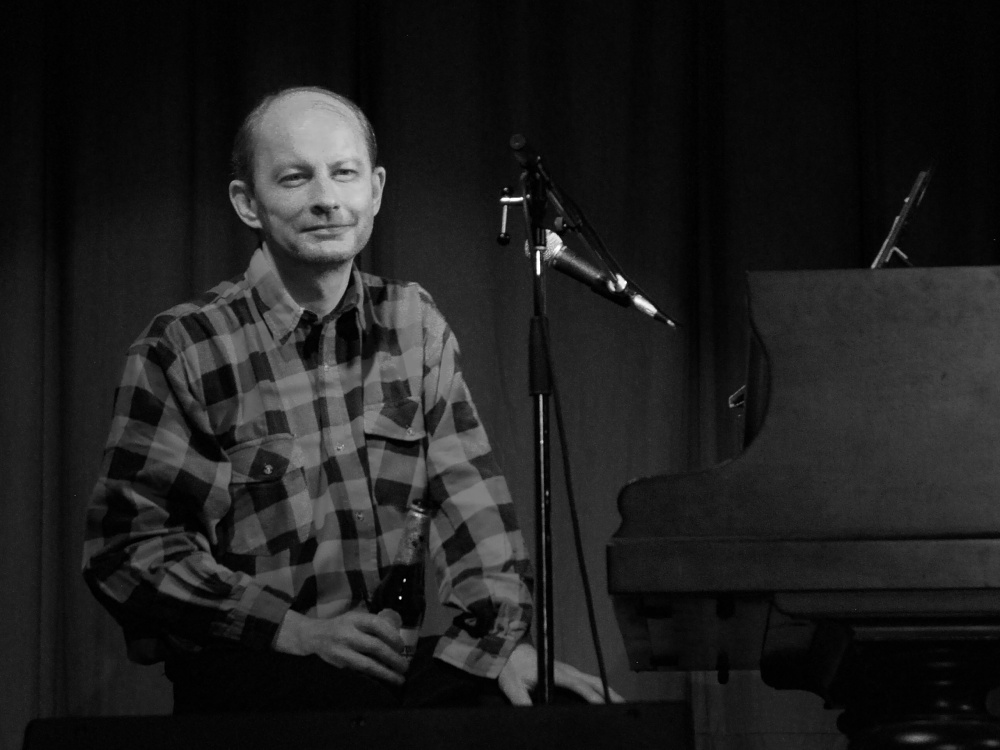
Filip Topol

Filip Topol (12 June 1965 – 19 June 2013) was a Czech singer, songwriter, pianist and writer. He was best known as leader of the alternative rock band Psí vojáci (Dog Soldiers), but he also performed as a solo artist. Topol was the younger brother of the writer Jáchym Topol, son of the playwright and dissident Josef Topol and grandchild of the writer Karel Schulz.

== Biography ==
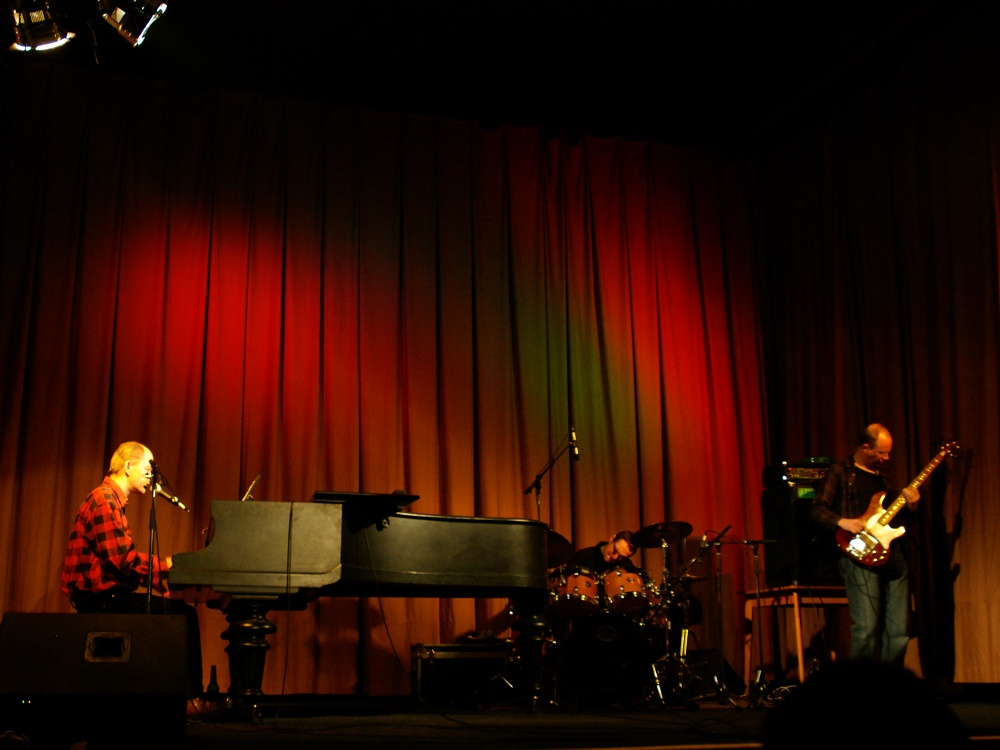
Topol (on left) performing with Psí vojáci (Dog Soldiers) at a concert in Prague in 2010.

Topol was born in Prague. He started playing piano as a child and was introduced to the Czech intellectual and artistic underground movement while he was still very young. He has co-founded Psí vojáci in 1979, along with the drummer David Skála and bassist Jan Hazuka. The band was named after the warriors from Thomas Berger's novel Little Big Man.

He made his solo public début at the age of 13, as an opening act before the first performance of the Plastic People of the Universe's Passion Play. The concert was held at Hrádeček, the private farm of Václav Havel. Topol played claviphone.

When he was 14 years old, he played with Psí vojáci at another concert held in Hrádeček. The band and other Topol's activities, as well as his family background and ties with the illegal Charter 77, attracted the attention of StB, the Czechoslovak secret police. He was first interrogated when he was 14 years old, along with his mother. His band was banned by state authorities and was allowed to perform only in 1986. Before that, they performed illegally and released samizdat recordings. After the Velvet Revolution in 1989, Psí vojáci became a professional band.

In the mid-1990s, Topol suffered serious health problems, partly due to alcohol abuse. He underwent several surgeries and a part of his pancreas had to be removed. His piano playing style was very expressive and wild during that period; sometimes he broke his knuckles during concerts and left his instrument dipped in blood. "Sometimes I feel that I tame the piano like a wild horse", he said.

== Death ==
He died after a long illness on 19 June 2013, in his native Prague, aged 48. He played the last concert with Psí vojáci in Amsterdam on 25 May 2013.

== Legacy ==
His song, "Žiletky (Razorblades)" inspired a 1994 Czech film of the same name. He appeared in the leading role.

== Discography ==
=== Solo ===
- Filip Topol & Agon Orchestra (Indies Records, 2001)
- Střepy (Indies Records, 1999)
- Sakramiláčku (Indies Records, 1995)

=== With Psí vojáci ===
- Těžko říct (Indies Records, 2003; "Hard to Say")
- Slečna Kristýna (Indies Records, 2002; "Miss Christine")
- U sousedů vyje pes (Indies Records, 2001; "The Neighbors' Dog is Howling")
- Psi a vojáci/Baroko v Čechách/Studio 1983-85 (Black Point, 2001; "Dogs and Soldiers/Baroque in Bohemia/Studio 1983-85")
- Myši v poli a jiné příběhy (Indies Records, 1999; "Fieldmice and Other Stories")
- Mučivé vzpomínky (Black Point, 1997; "Torturous Memories")
- Hořící holubi (Indies Records, 1997; "Flaming Pigeons")
- Národ psích vojáků (Indies Records, 1996; "Nation of Dog Soldiers") (compilation)
- Brutální lyrika (Indies Records, 1995; "Brutal Lyricism")
- Jáchym Topol & Psí vojáci: Sestra (Indies Records, 1995)
- Nechoď sama do tmy (Black Point, 1995; "Don't Go Out Alone After Dark")
- Live I and II (Gang Records, 1993)
- Baroko v Čechách (Black Point, 1993; "Baroque in Bohemia")
- Nalej čistého vína, pokrytče (Globus International, 1991; "Come Clean, You Hypocrite")
- Leitmotiv (Globus International, 1991)

== Bibliography ==
- Národ Psích vojáků. Prague: Maťa, 2004. ISBN 8072870912
- Tři novely (2004; "Three novels") ((Mně 13 (1995; "Me Thirteen"), Karla Klenotníka cesta na Korsiku (1999; "Karel Klenotník's journey to Corsica, 1999; named best prose work of 1999 by the Nadace Český literární fond), and the novella Zápisky milencovy (2001; "Notes of a Lover")) ISBN 8072871269
- Střepy (1999; Slivers) ISBN 8086013723
- Filip Topol: Psí vojáci (1993; "Filip Topol: Dog soldiers")
- Filip Topol (Psí vojáci): Texty 1985–1991 (1991; "Filip Topol (Dog Soldiers): Lyrics 1985-1991") ISBN 9788090085602

== Filmography ==
- Žiletky (1994)
- Praha mizerná (2000)
- Chvála bláznivosti (2001)
- A.B.C.D.T.O.P.O.L. (2002; a documentary about Jáchym Topol)
