= Petra Hůlová =

Czech writer (born 1979)

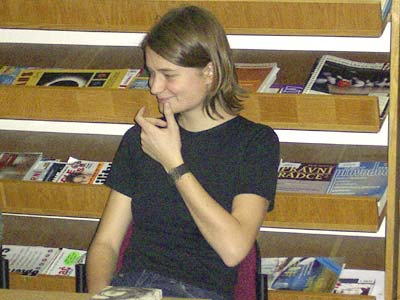
Petra Hůlová (2003)

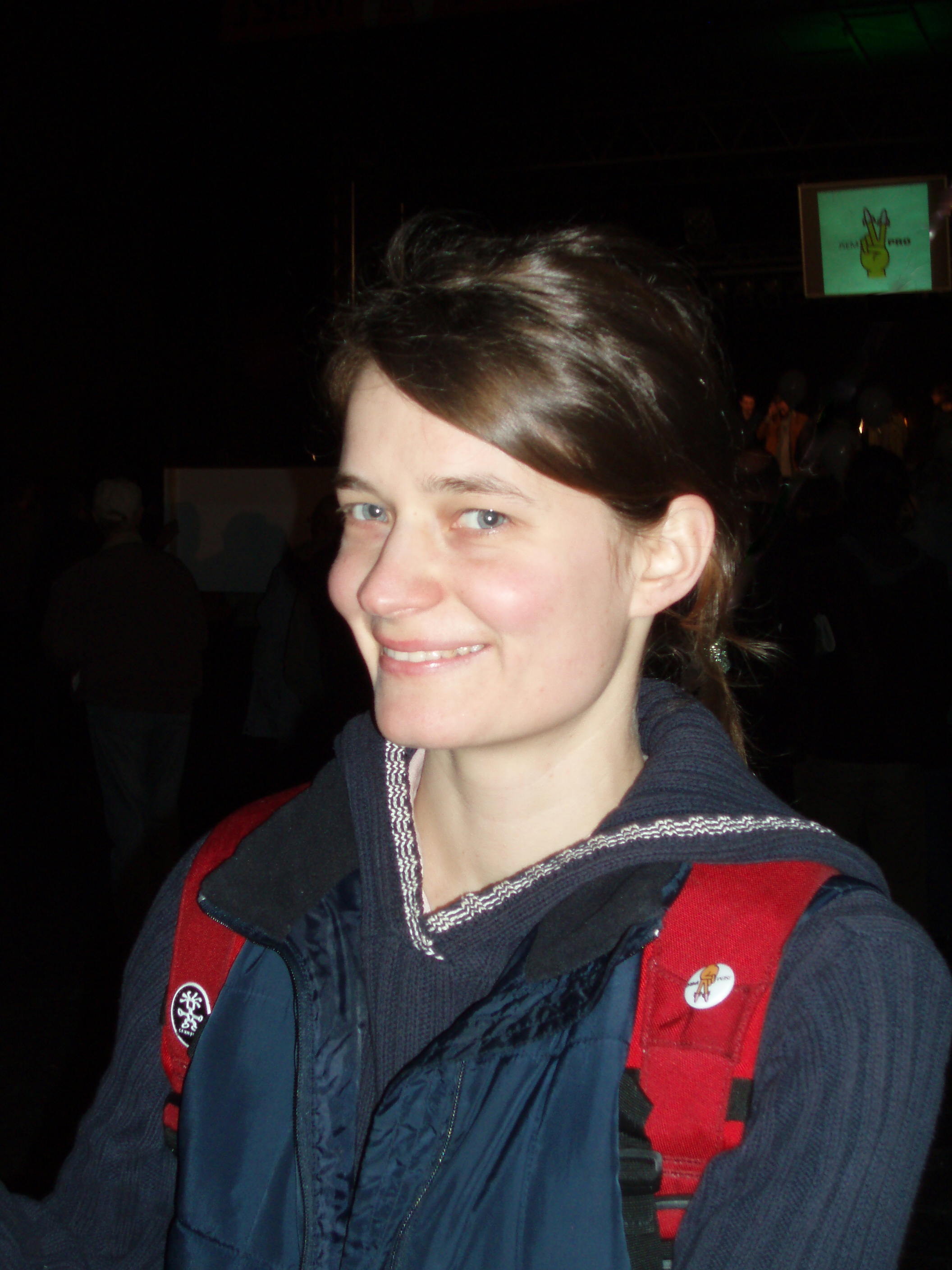
Petra Hůlová (2007)

Petra Hůlová (born 12 July 1979) is a Czech writer.

== Early life and education ==
Hůlová was born in Prague. She holds a degree in culturology from Charles University in Prague. She lived in Mongolia for one year as an exchange student after having studied the language and culture for several years and having originally had her interest sparked by "a chance encounter with the film Urga by acclaimed director Nikita Mikhalkov."

== Career ==
Hůlová rapidly rose to popularity in 2002 with the publication of her début novel Paměť mojí babičce, which became one of the most widely read Czech books of the decade. The novel is told from the point of view of five female narrators from three generations of the same Mongolian family. She chose to set the novel in Mongolia to avoid the necessity of writing about "artificial phenomena" such as career and media, by which she felt Mongolia had been less "polluted" than Europe; this allowed her to focus on writing about the basic feelings of her characters. The novel won a Magnesia Litera Prize as Discovery of the Year, and was voted Book of the Year by the Czech daily Lidové noviny.

Hůlová's second novel, Přes matný sklo, is set in Prague. The book, divided into three sections, offers a portrait of a relationship between a son (Ondřej) and his mother (unnamed). The first and third sections are narrated by the son; the second, by the mother.

Her stay as a Fulbright scholar in the Department of Anthropology at CUNY in 2004–05 inspired her third novel, Cirkus Les Mémoires, set in New York.

Hůlová's fourth novel, Umělohmotný třípokoj, narrated by a 30-year-old Prague call girl with a high-class clientele, won the Jiří Orten Prize, awarded each year to the author of a work of Czech prose or poetry. The author must be 30 or under at the time the work is finished, and the award carries a prize of 50,000 Kč (roughly $3,000). A stage adaptation by Viktorie Čermáková opened in Prague in 2007. Čermáková chose to attribute the text to five call girls and one narrator.

In 2008, her fifth novel, Stanice Tajga – about a Danish businessman named Hablund who disappears in Siberia after World War II and a man named Erske who, 60 years later, attempts to track him down—received the second annual Josef Škvorecký Award, which carries with it a prize of 250,000 Kč (roughly $14,500).

In October 2009, Northwestern University Press published the first translation of her work in English, All This Belongs to Me, a translation by Alex Zucker of her début, Paměť mojí babičce. Zucker's translation of her 2018 dystopian novel Stručně dějiny Hnutí, was published by World Editions in 2021 as The Movement.

== Works in Czech ==
(Translations of titles for informational purposes only.)

- Paměť mojí babičce (2002; "Memory to my Grandmother", in United States published as "All This Belongs To Me")
- Přes matný sklo (2004; "Through frosted Glass")
- Cirkus Les Mémoires (2005; "Circus Les Mémoires")
- Umělohmotný třípokoj (2006; "Plastic Three-bedroom Apartment," in US and UK Published as "Three Plastic Rooms")
- Stanice Tajga (2008; "Taiga Station")
- Strážci občanského dobra (2010; "Guardians of Civil Good")
- Čechy, země zaslíbená (2012; "Bohemia, the promised land")
- Macocha (2014)
- Stručné dějiny Hnutí (2018; "The Movement")
- Zlodějka mýho táty (2019)

== Personal life ==
Hůlová is married and has two children.
