= Ladislav Potměšil =

Czech actor (1945–2021)

- Born: 2 September 1945; Prague, Czechoslovakia
- Died: 12 July 2021 (aged 75)
- Occupation: Actor
- Years active: 1961–2017
- Spouse: Jaroslava Brousková
- Children: 2

Ladislav Potměšil (2 September 1945 – 12 July 2021) was a Czech actor.

== Selected filmography ==
- Partie krásného dragouna (1970)
- Tajemství Ocelového města (1978)
- Smrt krásných srnců (1986)
- Kamarád do deště (1988)
- Discopříběh (1987)
- Dobří holubi se vracejí (1988)
- Jen o rodinných záležitostech (1990)
- Zámek v Čechách (1993, TV)
- Byl jednou jeden polda (1995)
- Brouk v hlavě (2002, TV)
- Bastardi (2010)

=== TV series ===
- Hospoda (1996 - 1997)
- Ordinace v růžové zahradě (2005 - 2008)
- Svatby v Benátkách (2014)
- Přístav (2015 - 2017)
