= Vladimír Michálek =

Czech film director and screenwriter (born 1956)

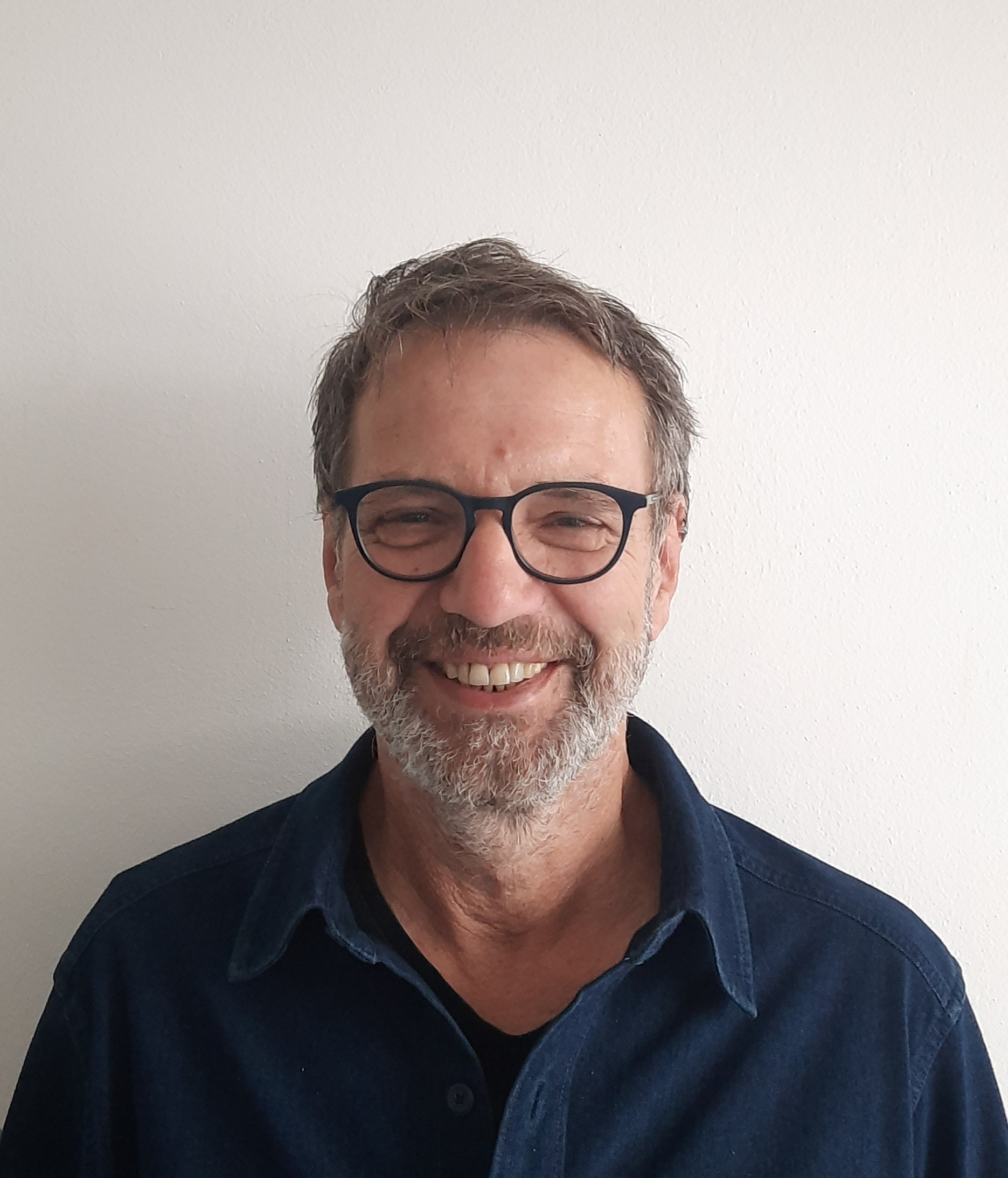
- Born: 2 November 1956 (age 70); Mladá Boleslav
- Occupations: film director & screenwriter

Vladimír Michálek (born 2 November 1956 in Mladá Boleslav) is a Czech film director and screenwriter.

== Life ==
Michálek graduated from Czech Film Academy FAMU, Prague, in 1992. Starting during his academic study he was filming documentaries. He joined the Barrandov Studios as assistant director, where he worked with Andrew Birkin (Burning Secret), Reinhard Hauff, Ted Kotcheff (The Shooter), Margarethe von Trotta and Bernhard Wicki. He has four children.

== Work ==
1994 was the year of the release of his first feature film, Amerika, a free adaptation of the Kafka novel. In 1996 Forgotten Light followed, a film adaption of the Jakub Deml novel. The film ran on the Karlovy Vary International Film Festival, as did this next movie, Sekal Has to Die, two years later. The latter won ten Czech Lion awards, including Best Direction, and succeeded Forgotten Light as the Czech Oscar-nominee. As with America, he wrote the screenplay for his film Angel Exit 2000. The film won the 2002 Daring Digital Award on the Jeonju International Film Festival.

Autumn Spring (2001), starring Vlastimil Brodský in his last role, received favorable reviews, including in The New York Times and The Washington Post. It won a number of prizes, such as the Best Foreign Language Film at the 2003 The Comedy Festival, as well as the Audience Awards of each the 2002 Cleveland International Film Festival, the 2002 St. Louis International Film Festival and the 2003 Sedona Film Festival.

He is also working for TV productions such as the 2003 series Záchranári. He directed the music videos for the song Černí andělé (Black Angels) by the band Lucie, and Chinaski's Podléhám.

== Filmography ==
=== Documentary Films ===
- In the Temple of Nature (1987)
- The Painful Silence (1990)
- Oh Mr. Anderson (1992)

=== Feature films ===
- Amerika (also screenplay, 1994)
- Forgotten Light (Zapomenuté světlo, 1996)
- Sekal Has to Die (Je třeba zabít Sekala, 1998)
- Prague Stories (compilation contribution, also screenplay, 1999)
- Angel Exit (screenplay written with Jáchym Topol, Anděl Exit, 2000)
- Autumn Spring (Babí léto 2001)
- Of Parents and Children (also screenplay, O rodičích a dětech, 2008)
- City of Birds (Město ptáků, upcoming)

=== TV films ===
- Jistota (1999)
- Lovec a datel (2004)
- Pískovna (2004)
