= Psí vojáci =

Czech rock band

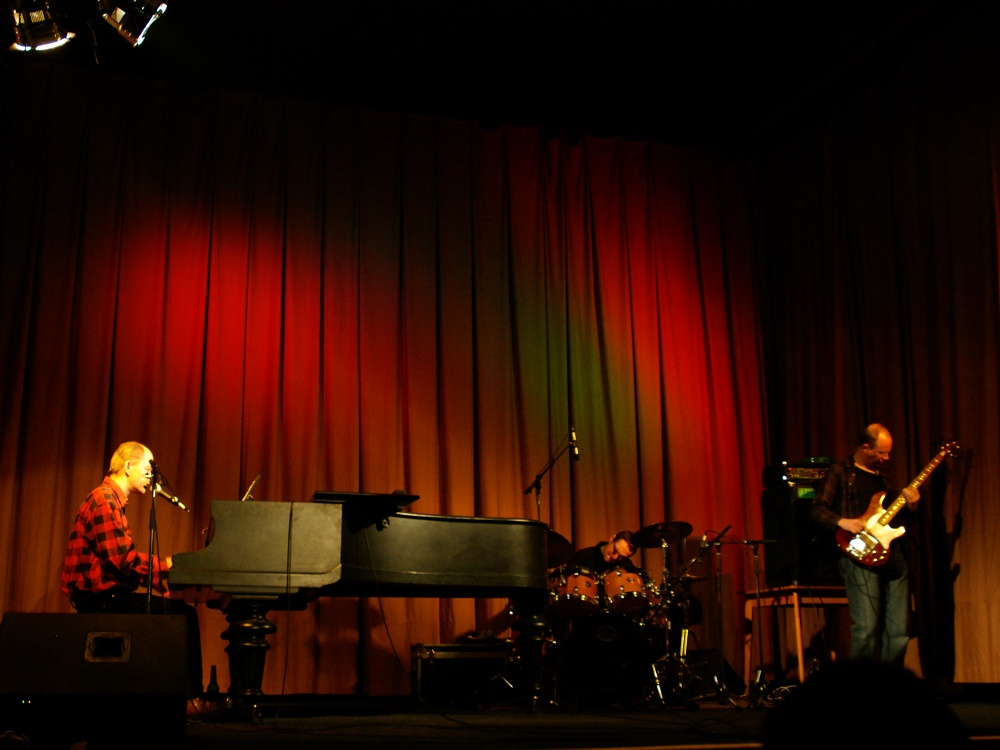
- Psí vojáci performing in 2010

Background information
- Also known as: P.V.O.
- Origin: Prague, Czechoslovakia
- Genres: Experimental rock; alternative rock; art rock; Prague underground
- Years active: 1979–2011; 2012–2013
- Label: Indies
- Past members: Filip Topol; David Skála; Jan Hazuka
- Website: Official website

Psí vojáci was a Czech rock band from Prague, fronted by the singer, pianist, and songwriter Filip Topol, son of the playwright Josef Topol and brother of the writer Jáchym Topol. It also included drummer David Skála and bassist Jan Hazuka. Formed in 1979, they issued their debut album, Nalej čistého vína, pokrytče, in 1990, which was followed by several more over the years, with the last one, Těžko říct, coming out in 2003. The group broke up in 2011 due to Topol's health problems, but reformed a year later, before finally breaking up in 2013, after Topol's death. They were considered one of the most important groups of the Prague underground countercultural movement.

== History ==
The singer and pianist Filip Topol, who was only 13 at the time, formed Psí vojáci in 1979 with drummer David Skála and bassist Jan Hazuka, his elementary school classmates. They named themselves after the Dog Soldiers, a Cheyenne military society that appeared in Thomas Berger's 1964 novel, Little Big Man. They first performed publicly in 1979, at the IX. Prague Jazz Days. The band soon drew the attention of the secret police. They were banned from performing publicly and resorted to playing at private underground events. In the late 1980s, they began performing under the abbreviation P.V.O. After issuing the EP P.V.O. under the Rock Debut 6 series in 1989, Psí vojáci released their first full-length album, Nalej čistého vína, pokrytče, in 1990. Their 1993 single "Žiletky" was adapted into a film of the same name in 1994, in which Topol played the lead role.

Psí vojáci disbanded in 2011, then reformed a year later, and finally ceased to exist in 2013, upon Topol's death. They were considered one of the most important groups of the Prague underground countercultural movement.

== Band members ==
- Filip Topol – vocals, piano (1979–2011, 2012–2013)
- David Skála – drums (1979–?, 2012–2013)
- Jan Hazuka – bass guitar (1979–?, 2012–2013)

== Discography ==
Studio albums

- Nalej čistého vína, pokrytče (1990)
- Leitmotiv (1991)
- Baroko v Čechách (1993)
- Sestra with Jáchym Topol (1994)
- Brutální lyrika (1995)
- Hořící holubi (1997)
- Myši v poli a jiné příběhy (1999)
- Studio 1983–85 (2000)
- U sousedů vyje pes (2001)
- Slečna Kristýna (2002)
- Těžko říct (2003)

EPs

- P.V.O. (Rock debut 6) (1989)

Live albums

- Vol. 1 and Vol. 2 (1990)
- 1979/80 Live (1991)
- Live I. and Live II. (1993)
- Nechoď sama do tmy (1995)
- Mučivé vzpomínky (1997)
- Psi a vojáci (2000)
- Od výčepu k baru (live 1987/1989) (2021)

Compilations

- Národ Psích vojáků (1996)

Singles

- "Žiletky" (1994)

== Literature ==
- Národ Psích vojáků (Maťa, 1999)
- Jirsa, Tomáš. Charting Post-Underground Nostalgia: Anachronistic Practices of the Post-Velvet Revolution Rock Scene. Iluminace, vol. 29, no. 3, 2017, pp. 65–86.
