= Žítková =

- Municipality
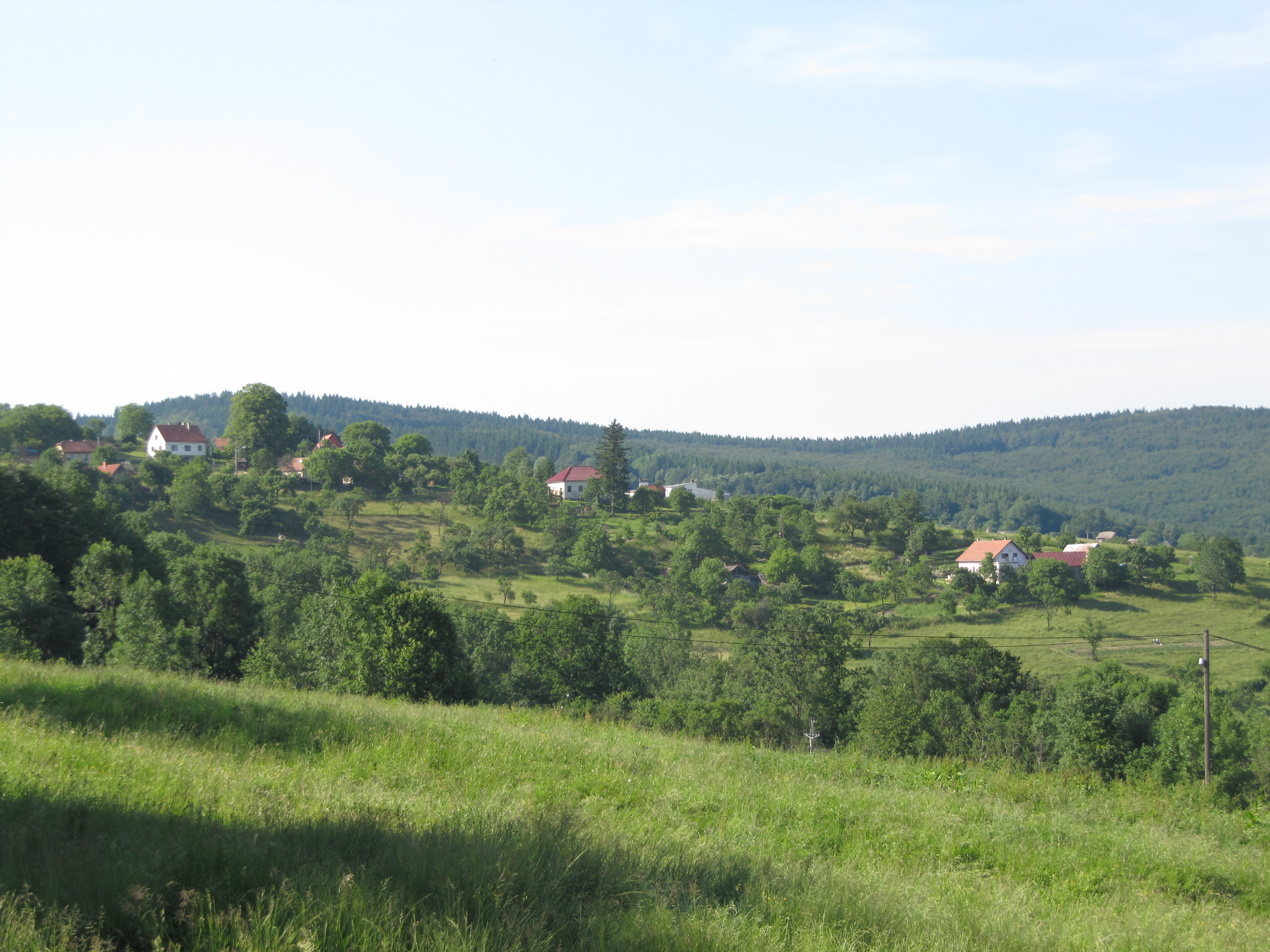
- Scattered buildings typical for Žítková

- Flag Coat of arms

- Location in the Czech Republic
- Coordinates: 48°58′49″N 17°52′49″E
- Country: Czech Republic
- Region: Zlín
- District: Uherské Hradiště
- First mentioned: 1731

Area
  - Total: 6.11 km^{2} (2.36 sq mi)
- Elevation: 590 m (1,940 ft)

Population (2026-01-01)
  - Total: 175
  - Density: 28.6/km^{2} (74.2/sq mi)
- Time zone: UTC+1 (CET)
  - Summer (DST): UTC+2 (CEST)
- Postal code: 687 74
- Website: www.zitkova.cz

Žítková is a municipality and village in Uherské Hradiště District in the Zlín Region of the Czech Republic. It has about 200 inhabitants.

== Geography ==
Žítková is located about 31 kilometres (19 mi) east of Uherské Hradiště, 31 km (19 mi) south of Zlín and 14 km (9 mi) northwest of Trenčín, on the border with Slovakia. It lies in the White Carpathians mountain range and within the Bílé Karpaty Protected Landscape Area. The highest point is the hill Žítkovský vrch at 669 m (2,195 ft) above sea level, and the majority of the dispersed settlement is situated on its slopes. The municipal territory contains two nature reserves called Hutě and Pod Žítkovským vrchem.

== History ==
In the 16th and 17th centuries, the area was repeatedly ravaged by the raids of Tatars, Turks and Kurucs. Žítková was founded during the colonisation at the turn of the 17th and 18th centuries. The first written mention of Žítková is from 1731, when new settlers came to the village.

== Demographics ==
Historical population

Year	Pop.	±%
1869	797	—
1880	759	−4.8%
1890	828	+9.1%
1900	867	+4.7%
1910	939	+8.3%

Year	Pop.	±%
1921	859	−8.5%
1930	880	+2.4%
1950	816	−7.3%
1961	912	+11.8%
1970	634	−30.5%

Year	Pop.	±%
1980	431	−32.0%
1991	282	−34.6%
2001	248	−12.1%
2011	176	−29.0%
2021	170	−3.4%

Source: Censuses

== Transport ==
There are no railways or major roads passing through the municipality. On the Czech–Slovak border is the road border crossing Žítková / Liešna.

== Sights ==
Among the protected cultural monuments in the municipality are two homesteads (one from the early 19th century and one undated) and a hayloft from the 19th century.
