= Jan Pelc =

Czech writer (born 1957)

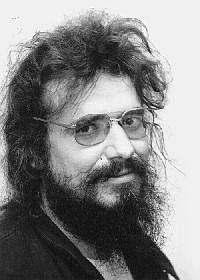
Jan Pelc

Jan Pelc (born 15 April 1957, Podbořany, Czechoslovakia) is a Czech writer.

Between 1980 and 1989, he had been in emigration in France. Since 1993, he has lived in Prague. His highlight is the novel ...a bude hůř (first published in 1985 by Index in Germany, first published in the Czech Republic by Panorama in 1990).

== Biography ==
After finishing school, where he was learning to become a locksmith, Pelc worked in a power plant. He was exposed to Czech underground when he was still a teenager, when he was attending concerts forbidden in Czechoslovakia, such as The Plastic People of the Universe. During the 70s and 80s he was co-editing the Prague magazine "Vokno: časopis pro druhou i jinou kulturu". In 1981 he emigrated to the west, escaping from his trip to Yugoslavia. Between 1980 and 1989 he lived in France, editing emigration magazine "Svědectví". Currently he lives in Prague.

Published in Cologne in 1985, his debut novel ...a bude hůř caused a discussion among the Czech emigration society and Czech opposition - accusations were made about book's lack of patriotism and pornography. In 1985 Pelc came second in Radio Free Europe's contest for the most popular Czech writer.

In 2007, ...a bude hůř was filmed. Director Petr Nikolaev decided that film should be black and white.

== Work ==
- ...a bude hůř (1990)
- Bez ohňů je underground (1992)
- Basket flora (1995)
- ...a máš mě rád? (1999)
- ...a to mi nemůžete udělat (2000)
- ...a výstupy do údolí (2000)
- ...a golpotoni táhnou (2002)
- Šmírák (2002)
- ...a vyberte si (2004)
- Basket flora I, – Šéf přichází (2004)
- Basket flora II, – Démon zločinu kandiduje (2006)
- ...a poslední kouř (2006)
- Kauiai (2009)
