= Andel Exit =

2000 Czech drama film

- Directed by: Vladimír Michálek
- Written by: Vladimír Michálek; Jáchym Topol (based on the novel of Jáchym Topol)
- Produced by: Jaroslav Boucek
- Starring: Jan Cechticky; Klára Issová
- Edited by: Jiří Brožek
- Music by: Jan Cechticky; Yarda Helesic
- Release date: October 26, 2000
- Running time: 100 min
- Country: Czech Republic
- Language: Czech

Andel Exit (also called as Angel Exit) is a 2000 Czech drama movie directed by Vladimír Michálek with Jan Cechticky and Klára Issová. The movie was based on the 1995 novel of Jáchym Topol named Anděl. The movie earned two Czech Lion Awards in 2000 for Best Design and Best Editing.

The movie vividly depicts the former atmosphere and architecture around Anděl in the 1990s, before the progressive renovation of the neighbourhood. The efforts came to fruition in the early 2000s with the construction of Zlatý Anděl, a multi-purpose office and business development, followed by a shopping centre and many more new businesses.

== Synopsis ==
The film is about Mike, an addict and a thief, who decides to get away from drugs after falling for his new neighbour Jane. However, his girlfriend Kaja keeps an influence on him and convinces him to cook one last batch. Following tricks of Kaja, Mike ends up in South Africa where he gets involved with local gangsters and meth dealers.

== Cast ==
- Jan Čechtický as Mikes
- Klára Issová as Kája
- Zuzana Stivínová as Jana
- Vojtěch Pavlíček as Lukás
- Pavel Landovský as Machata
- Eva Holubová as Machatová
- Věra Galatíková as Head Nurse
- Martin Sitta as Cinca
- Jan Kehár as Pikna
- Lucie Váchová as Kája
- Markéta Tanner as Stepa
- Žofie Hradilková as Nada
- Pavel Zajíček as Luria
- Martin Telvák as Guinea pig

== Production ==
After being impressed by the novel of Jáchym Topol named Anděl, director Vladimír Michálek met with him and asked Topol to accompany with him in the screenplay. The film commenced its shooting on December 24, 1999.

== Reception ==
The movie was met with positive reviews. CER said that despite having an infantile plot, the film worked best on the microscopic level by picking up the minutiae of modern life and capturing the ills of a generation on screen. Film Blitz also noted that the film provide an eye-opening picture of a rarely-seen side of Prague: life in ageing decrepit appartement blocks near the metro station Anděl near the centre of the city, of peddled religious icons and groceries bought on credit, where meaningless sex and drugs are used as an escape by the main characters.

== Awards ==
Czech Lion Awards, 2000

- Won, Best Design - Vladimír Michálek and Martin Strba
- Won, Best Editing - Jiří Brožek
- Nominated, Best Actress - Klára Issová
- Nominated, Best Actress in a Supporting Role - Zuzana Stivínová
- Nominated, Best Director - Vladimír Michálek
- Nominated, Best Cinematography - Martin Strba
- Nominated, Best Sound - Radim Hladík Jr.

== Trivia ==
- The movie was shot entirely digitally using a skeleton crew and then transferred onto 35mm film
- Klára Issová shaved her head completely bald (on screen) for the movie.
