= Pleasant Moments =

2006 Czech drama film

- Directed by: Věra Chytilová
- Written by: Věra Chytilová
- Produced by: Adam Polák
- Starring: Jana Janeková
- Cinematography: Martin Strba
- Edited by: Jiří Brožek
- Music by: David Kraus
- Production company: Ceská Televize
- Distributed by: Bontonfilm
- Release date: 21 September 2006
- Running time: 113 minutes
- Country: Czech Republic
- Languages: Czech; German
- Budget: €600,000
- Box office: $127,052

Pleasant Moments (Czech: Hezké chvilky bez záruky) is a 2006 Czech drama film written and directed by Věra Chytilová. The film was awarded Best Editing (Jiří Brožek) at the 2006 Czech Lion Awards. It is the final film by Vera Chytilova.

== Cast ==
- Jana Janeková - Hana
- Jana Krausová - Eva
- Bolek Polívka - Dub (as Boleslav Polívka)
- David Kraus - Pavel
- Igor Bareš - Karel
- Martin Hofmann - Petr
- Miroslav Hájek - Honzík
- Ivana Milbachová
- Jirí Ornest - Benda
- Katerina Irmanovová - Bendová
- Barbora Hrzánová - Sára (as Bára Hrzánová)
