= Jaroslav Soukup (director) =

- Born: 19 November 1946 (age 79); Plzeň, Czechoslovakia
- Known for: film director and producer

Jaroslav Soukup (born 19 November 1946) is a Czech director. After graduating from Film and TV School of the Academy of Performing Arts in Prague he made his directorial debut in the 1976 film Boty plné vody.

== Filmography ==
- Konečná (1970 – student film)
- Temná brána noci (1971 – student film)
- Boty plné vody (1976 – povídka Zimní vítr)
- Drsná planina (1979)
- Romaneto (1980)
- Dostih (1981)
- Vítr v kapse (1982)
- Záchvěv strachu (1983)
- Láska z pasáže (1984)
- Pěsti ve tmě (1986)
- Discopříběh (1987)
- Kamarád do deště (1988)
- Divoká srdce (1989)
- Discopříběh 2 (1991)
- Kamarád do deště II – Příběh z Brooklynu
- Svatba upírů (1993)
- Byl jednou jeden polda (1995)
- Byl jednou jeden polda II. – major Maisner opět zasahuje! (1997)
- Byl jednou jeden polda III. – major Maixner a tančící drak (1999)
- Jak ukrást Dagmaru (2001)
- Policie Modrava (2008)- pilot episode of TV series
- Policie Modrava (2013/2014)- 15 episodes
- Policie Modrava (2016)- 8 episodes
