= The City of the Sun (film) =

2005 film

- Czech: Sluneční stát
- Directed by: Martin Šulík
- Written by: Martin Šulík, Alice Nellis, Marek Lescák
- Starring: Oldřich Navrátil
- Cinematography: Martin Štrba
- Edited by: Jiří Brožek
- Music by: Vladimír Godár
- Release date: 21 April 2005
- Running time: 90 minutes
- Countries: Czech Republic, Slovakia
- Languages: Slovak; Czech

The City of the Sun (Czech: Sluneční stát) is a 2005 comedy film written and directed by Martin Šulík and starring Oldřich Navrátil and Ľuboš Kostelný. The film won the main prize at the 2005 Finále Plzeň Film Festival. At the 2006 ceremony for The Sun in a Net Awards, the film won in six categories. The film was Slovakia's submission for the Academy Award for Best Foreign Language Film for the 78th Academy Awards. The film won in two categories at the Czech Lion Awards, specifically for music and editing.

== Cast ==
- Oldřich Navrátil as Karel
- Ivan Martinka as Tomáš
- Ľuboš Kostelný as Vinco
- Igor Bareš as Milan
- Anna Cónová as Tereza
- Petra Špalková as Marta
- Anna Šišková as Vilma
- Lucie Žáčková as Eva

== See also ==
- List of Slovak submissions for the Academy Award for Best Foreign Language Film
- List of Czech films of the 2000s
