= Žiletky =

1994 Czech drama film

Žiletky is a Czech drama film directed by Zdenek Tyc. It was released in 1994.

== Cast ==
- Filip Topol as Andrej Chadima
- Markéta Hrubešová as Kristýna
- Iva Janžurová as Chadimova
- Tomáš Hanák as Míra
- Barbora Lukešová as Eva
- Vera Kubánková as Granny
- Jozef Topol as Father
- Petr Lébl as Angel
- Tereza Pergnerová as Nurse
- Václav Legner
- Zdeněk Vencl
