= Lutfi Zaghloul =

Palestinian poet

- Born: 1938 (age 87–88); Nablus, Mandatory Palestine
- Occupation: Poet
- Relatives: Abdul Latif Zaghloul (father)

Lutfi Zaghloul (Arabic: لطفي زغلول; born 1938) is a Palestinian poet. He was born in Nablus, the eldest son of the late Palestinian poet Abdul Latif Zaghloul. Zaghloul's poetic talent began in Al-Hayat School, where he wrote his first poem about Palestine, and during which he acquired the title "Emerging Poet" by a teacher of Arabic at his school. He is also one of the first poets to have a website that contains the majority of his works.

== Early life ==
Zaghloul studied political history at the Damascus University, then returned to Nablus, where he taught in government schools during Jordanian rule and was dismissed by decision of the Israeli military governor in 1990 after the release of his first poetry book, From You... To You (original: minki... ilayki, which included two poetry collections containing love poems, and one that discussed the Palestinian cause and promoted national action.

In an interview with Wafa, Zaghloul adds that after his dismissal, he joined as a teacher of education at Intermediate University College, Nablus and worked there for five years. He also worked as a Hebrew teacher at An-Najah National University.

Zaghloul obtained his master's degree in education sciences, specializing in curriculum design, and received an honorary doctorate from the World Association of Arab Translators & Linguists in 2007.

He hosted many poetry evenings for several years in Palestine and abroad with poets from Japan, England, France, Spain, Turkey, Greece, Morocco and Egypt by participating in the International Poetry Festival. Zaghloul represented his home country in many countries (Jordan, Egypt Morocco). He participated in many political, educational and historical seminars in his country.

In 1995, he started writing a weekly column titled Whisper (original: Hamsa) for Al-Quds newspaper where he discusses political, cultural, literary and educational issues. He is also extensively involved in local and Arab radio and television networks.

== Awards ==
His song "Palestine Singers" (original: Mughannāt Filasṭīn) ranked number one in the Arab world at Dubai National Arabic Song Festival (2003). He was awarded by Operation Smile Palestine in recognition of his efforts in writing the Universal Beautiful Smile song, which was translated into English (1998). He wrote many national, educational and children's songs (female guides, sports and scouts).

He received many Palestinian, Arab and foreign plaques, certificates and medals. He was awarded a range of certificates of merit and plaques by official and civil national institutions, a medal of appreciation for his publications in the field of literature (1995), the Palestinian Ministry of Education plaque in recognition of his literary and poetic efforts (2005), and two certificates of merit by Operation Smile (1996).

The Ministry of Higher Education selected his poem "Song of Youth" (original: Nashīd al-shabāb) as an anthem for Palestine Technical Colleges in (1997). It had selected the poem "Home of the Free" (original: mawṭin al-aḥrār) in 2001 and later the poems "My Library" (original: Maktabatī), "My Book" (original: Kitābī), "Water" (original: al-māʼ) and "Freedom" (original: al-ḥurrīyah). In addition, The Ministry of Youth and Sport adopted the poem "Palestinian Youth Organization" (original: Munaẓẓamat al-Ṭalāʼiʻ al-Filasṭīnīyah) (2002). He also translated many of his poems into English and French.

Three university studies examined his poetry collections:

- A study of Latifi Zaghloul's poetry, under the supervision of Dr. Muhammad Jawad Al-Nuri.
- A study on his collection of poetry No Love... Except For You (original: Lā ḥubban... ilá anti), under the supervision of Dr. Walid Jarrar.
- A study of women in Lutfi Zaghloul's poetry, under the supervision of Dr. Zahir Ibrahim Al-Saif.

Lutfi has done a great deal of analytical reading over the years, the following are some examples:

Two analytical readings by Dr. Abdul Rahman Abbad covered two of his poetry collections:

- I Read in Your Eyes: Poetry (original: Aqraʼu fī ʻaynayki: shiʻr)
- Let Us Go Home (original: Ḥayyā nashudū lil-waṭan)
- An analytical reading of Sufi poetry in Lutfi Zaghloul's poetry collection Whisper of the Soul (original: Hams al-rūḥ) was conducted by Dr. Abdel Monem Khorshid of the Sorbonne-Paris.
- An analytical reading of his poetry collection, Here We Are... Here We Will Be (original: hunā kunā... hunā sanakūn) by Dr. Abdullah Maymon – Casablanca, Morocco.
- Two analytical readings of his poetry collections Poems in the Color of Love (original: Qaṣāʼid balūn al-ḥubb) and A Folk Song in the Arabian Night (original: Mawwāl-- fī al-layl al-ʻArabī) by Prof. Suleiman Fiume (American University of Beirut).

== Works ==
- Poetry book, From You... To You (original: minki... ilayki), (1994):
1. Days... Not Haunted by Days (original: Ayyām lā taghtāluha al-Ayyām) (poetry collection)
2. On... The Walls of The Moon (original: ʻalá judrān al-qamar) (poetry collection)
- Poetry book, For Your Eyes... I Write Poetry (original: Li-ʻaynayki-- aktubu shiʻran), (1997):
1. Because... You're You (original: Li-annakai antī antī) (poetry collection)
2. You... Come First (original: antī awwalan) (poetry collection)
- A Soliloquy (original: Munājāt): spiritual poem (1999).
- Whisper of the Soul: Poetry (original: Hams al-rūḥ: shiʻr) (spiritual poem) (2003)
- The Orbit of Fire and Light (original: Madār al-nār wa-al-nawwār): a national and political poem (2003)
