= Sekal Has to Die =

- Czech Poster
- Directed by: Vladimír Michálek
- Written by: Jiří Křižan
- Starring: Bogusław Linda
- Edited by: Jiří Brožek
- Music by: Michał Lorenc
- Release date: 16 October 1998 (Poland)
- Running time: 109 minutes
- Countries: Czech Republic; Poland; Slovakia; France
- Language: Czech

Sekal Has to Die (Czech: Je třeba zabít Sekala, Polish: Zabić Sekala) is a 1998 film directed by Vladimír Michálek. It was the Czech Republic's submission to the 71st Academy Awards for the Academy Award for Best Foreign Language Film, but was not accepted as a nominee. It is a co-production between the Czech Republic, Poland, Slovakia and France.

The plot takes place in the small Moravian village during World War II.

== Cast ==
- Bogusław Linda as Ivan Sekal
- Olaf Lubaszenko as Jura Baran
- Agnieszka Sitek as Agnieszka
- Jiří Bartoška as Priest
- Vlasta Chramostová as Mari
- L'udovít Cittel as Runt

== See also ==
- Cinema of the Czech Republic
- List of submissions to the 71st Academy Awards for Best Foreign Language Film
- List of Czech submissions for the Academy Award for Best Foreign Language Film
