= Vítr v kapse =

Vítr v kapse is a Czech drama film written and directed by Jaroslav Soukup. It was released in 1982.
