= Ali Faik Zaghloul =

Egyptian radio presenter

Ali Faik Zaghloul (Arabic: علي فايق زغلول; 3 March 1924 – 13 October 1995) was an Egyptian radio presenter. He is considered the father of Egyptian radio variety shows.
