= Karel Schulz =

Czech writer (1899–1943)

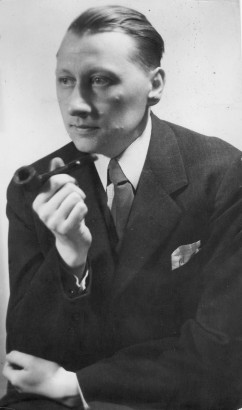
- Karel Schulz in 1930
- Born: 6 May 1899; Městec Králové, Bohemia, Austria-Hungary
- Died: 27 February 1943 (aged 43); Prague, Protectorate of Bohemia and Moravia

Karel Schulz (6 May 1899 – 27 February 1943) was a Czech novelist, theatre critic, poet and short story writer, whose best known work is the historical novel Stone and Pain (1942; Czech: Kámen a bolest).

== Work ==
- Kámen a bolest (Stone and pain) (1942) – historical novel, biography of Michelangelo Buonarroti
- Papežská mše (Popes' Mess)(1943) – incomplete second volume

== See also ==
- List of Czech writers
