= Věra Sokolová =

Czech anthropologist, university educator, feminist

- Born: 1970 (age 55–56); Czechoslovakia

Academic background
- Education: Charles University (BS); California State University (BA); University of Washington (MA, PhD)
- Thesis: A matter of speaking: Racism, gender and social deviance in the politics of the “Gypsy question” in communist Czechoslovakia, 1945–1989 (2002)
- Doctoral advisor: James Ramon Felak
- Other advisors: Uta G. Poiger; Suzanne Lebsock

Academic work
- Discipline: Sociology
- Sub-discipline: Gender studies, LGBT+ studies
- Institutions: Charles University

Věra Sokolová (born 1970) is a Czech academic who specializes in gender studies and specifically focuses on identity policy and the construction of sexuality from a historical and social perspective, evaluating the power, structuring and defining of sexuality to transcend binary boundaries. She is the chair of the Department of Gender Studies at Charles University in Prague. She is the co-managing editor of Gender and Generation, along with Kateřina Kolářová.

== Early life and education ==
Věra Sokolová was born in Czechoslovakia in 1970. She earned a Bachelor of Science degree in geography at Charles University in 1992, before continuing her studies in the United States at California State University in Sacramento. In the U.S., she studied history and cultural anthropology. After graduating summa cum laude with a Bachelor of Arts degree in history in 1994, she completed a master's degree (1996) and a PhD in history at the University of Washington (2002). Her dissertation was titled "A matter of speaking: Racism, gender, and social deviance in the politics of the “Gypsy question” in communist Czechoslovakia, 1945–1989." Sokolová's doctoral advisor was James Ramon Felak. Other academic advisors included Uta G. Poiger and Suzanne Lebsock.

== Career ==
Sokolová was one of the pioneering academics of gender studies in the Czech Republic, beginning to teach the subject before it was an accredited field in the country. She inaugurated the Queer Studies course in the arts faculty of Charles University in 2001. Since 2003 she has been the chair of the Department of Gender Studies in the Humanities Faculty of Charles University and is the co-managing editor of the academic journal Gender and Generation of the department. She has lectured abroad at the New School University in New York City, University of Maryland, Baltimore, and the University of Washington. She also is a member of the Czech Republics Government Council's Committee for Sexual Minorities.

=== Research ===
Sokolová's research interests lie in the development of the idea of gender and its historic constructs in society. She has studied the history of the discipline, as it moved from women's studies, to feminist studies, and finally gender studies and is interested in the way that the definition of gender effects power relationships in society. She has evaluated how feminist movements were different in Western and socialist countries, in that rather than a political movement, the state took over the mechanisms to modernize women's status in the East. She has analyzed the impact of the development of ethnic and gender studies on governmental policy. For example, under communism, Roma ethnic groups were treated as deviant, but launching programs to reignite the study of the Romani people's ethnicity in the 1970s amplified their differences and escalated discrimination in society. In her studies on policy, Sokolová has shown that officials arbitrarily applied policy, based on ethnicity and gender. During the state socialist period, the national policy to increase births did not allow Czech and Slovak women to have abortions. Simultaneously a policy of forced sterilization was implemented on Romani women in an effort to correct falling birth rates among Czech and Slovak women.

According to Sokolová, the invisibility of non-heterosexual lives in the Soviet period was erased with the birth of gender studies. Identification of homosexuals and lesbians created a consequence that they might be seen as criminals and hardened hetero-normative and binary definitions of society. She found that women's studies programs, or the interpretation of feminism projected to the country from Czech exiles living abroad, like Josef Škvorecký, created a disregard or anti-feminist reaction in the Czech Republic. This included lesbians, who were doubly discriminated against as women by society at large and as queer by the homosexual community. The Queer Studies course she launched at Charles University focuses on a critical analysis of how sexuality is used as a means of social control. She has been involved in the state television program for the LGBT community, known as Queer (formerly called LeGaTo) since it began airing in 2004 and participates in community activism on both a cultural and political level.

== Selected works ==
- Sokolová, Věra (2001). "Representations of Homosexuality and the Separation of Gender and Sexuality in the Czech Republic Before and After 1989". In Isaacs, Ann Katherine (ed.). Political Systems and Definitions of Gender Roles. Pisa: Edizioni Plus, Università di Pisa. pp. 273–288. ISBN 978-88-8492-072-0.
- Sokolová, Věra (2004). "'Don't Get Pricked!' Representation and the Politics of Sexuality in the Czech Republic". In Forrester, Sibelan; Zaborowska, Magdalena J.; Gapova, Elena (eds.). Over the Wall/After the Fall: Post-Communist Cultures through an East-West Gaze. Bloomington, Indiana: Indiana University Press. pp. 251–268. ISBN 0-253-11035-1.
- Sokolová, Věra (2005). "Identity Politics and the (B)orders of Heterosexism: Lesbians, Gays and Feminists in the Czech Media after 1989". In Leeuwen-Turnovcová, Jiřina van; Richter, Nicole (eds.). Mediale Welten in Tschechien nach 1989: Genderprojektionen und Codes des Plebejismus. München: Verlag Otto Sagner. pp. 29–44. ISBN 978-3-87690-896-0.
- Sokolová, Věra (2008). Cultural Politics of Ethnicity: Discourses on Roma in Communist Czechoslovakia. Stuttgart, Germany: Ibidem-Verlag. ISBN 978-3-89821-864-1.
- Sokolová, Věra (2012). "Planned Parenthood behind the Curtain: Population Policy and Sterilization of Romani Women in Communist Czechoslovakia, 1972-1989". In Hall, Timothy McCajor; Read, Rosie (eds.). Changes in the Heart of Europe: Recent Ethnographies of Czechs, Slovaks, Roma, and Sorbs. Stuttgart: ibidem Verlag. pp. 139–172. ISBN 978-3-8382-5606-1.
- Sokolová, Věra (2014). "State Approaches to Homosexuality and Non-heterosexual Lives in Czechoslovakia during State Socialism". In Havelková, Hana; Oates-Indruchová, Libora (eds.). The Politics of Gender Culture under State Socialism: An Expropriated Voice. London: Routledge. pp. 82–108. ISBN 978-1-317-81908-0.
- Sokolová, Věra (2020). Queer Encounters with Communist Power : Non-Heterosexual Lives and the State in Czechoslovakia, 1948–1989. Prague: Karolinum Press. ISBN 978-80-246-4266-6.
