= Jan Štěkna =

Czech Cistercian priest

Jan Štěkna (died c. 1407) was a Czech Cistercian who lived in the 14th–15th centuries and served as the pastor of Jadwiga of Poland.

== Life ==
Štěkna studied at Charles University, becoming a baccalarius in liberal arts in 1373 and a master's in 1391; he also received a bachelor's in theology (1391), as well as a master's (1403) In 1393 he preached at the Bethlehem Chapel, and he would later oppose the Hussite movement.

Štěkna moved to Cracow through the influence of Matthew of Kraków. He taught in the theology faculty of the University of Cracow until his death around 1407.

== Works ==
- Carcer anime; Sermo ad populum factus apud Carmelitas contra Wikleff contra remanenciam panis. Vienna, ÖNB 4314, f. 135b.
- Collecta ex dictis diversorum doctorum contra Ioh. Wikleff et contra tractatum de corpore Christi Stanikonis et alium tractatum Ioh. Hus, qui ponunt remanenciam panis in sacramento altaris. Vienna, ÖNB 4314, f. 136a.
- Sermones.
