= Wilhelm Winkler =

Austrian author (1884–1984)

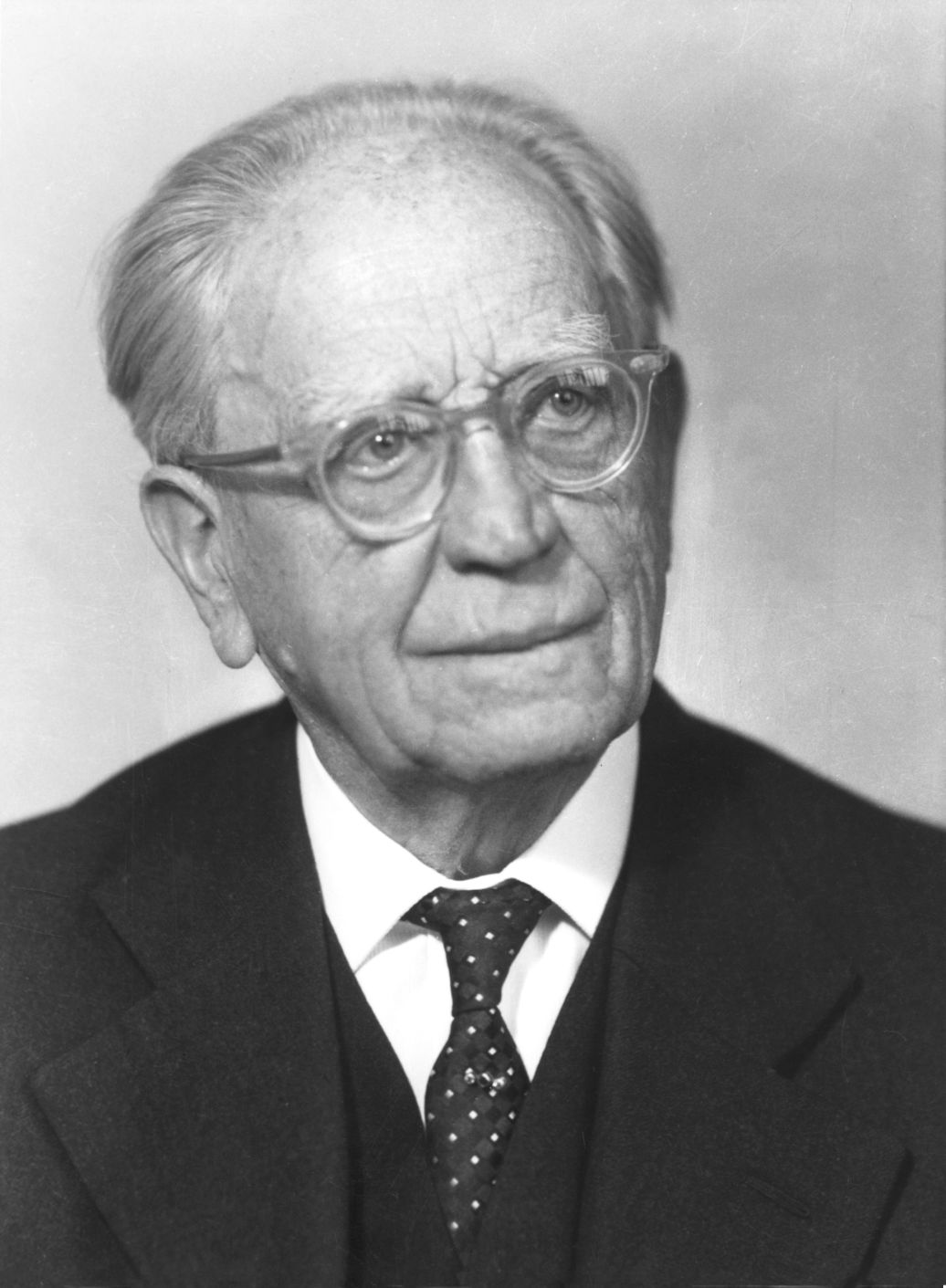
- Born: 29 June 1884; Prague, Bohemia, Austria-Hungary
- Died: 3 September 1984 (aged 100); Vienna, Austria
- Education: Charles-Ferdinand University, Prague
- Known for: Population statistics
- Spouse(s): Clara Deutch, 1918
- Awards: Honorary member of the International Statistical Institute, President of the International Statistical Institute, Austrian Academy of Sciences, Royal Statistical Society, Honorary Degrees from the Ludwig-Maximilians-Universität München (LMU) and the University of Vienna

Wilhelm Winkler (29 June 1884 – 3 September 1984) was a Czech-Austrian statistician and politician. He had successful careers as both an academic statistician (despite receiving no formal academic training in the field), and a program director in the Austrian government.

== Biography ==
=== Early life ===
Wilhelm was the fifth of the eight children of Anne and music teacher Julius Winkler, a family situation that required him to work starting at age 13. He attended law school at Charles-Ferdinand University in Prague, practiced law briefly in 1908, did a stint in the Austrian army, then settled into a position at the Statistical Bureau of Bohemia as the sole German-speaking statistician. While working there, he attended many university classes and reached the conclusion that "the German statistical literature did not offer too many ideas. New life came into statistics from England and Russia where the importance of mathematical tools was recognized."

=== War years ===
Winkler re-enlisted in the Austrian army at the outbreak of World War I in 1914, and was decorated twice for bravery before being wounded in November 1915. During a lengthy recovery, he worked for the War Economy committee; his talents were recognized and he was appointed Secretary of State for Military Affairs at the end of the war in 1918 and he was a delegate to the Versailles Peace Conference. That year, he also married a Jewish woman named Clara Deutch. He joined the Austrian Central Statistics Office in 1920, and was promoted to director of its department of population statistics in 1925. Concurrently, he became a Privat-Dozent (assistant professor) at the University of Vienna in 1921 and an Ausserordentlicher Professor in 1929. He founded an institute for the study of minority populations, which published a constant stream of progressive and influential papers that made him unpopular with colleagues in his government job. Despite his lack of formal education, he was elected a member of the International Statistical Institute in 1926 where he actively promoted applied and precise mathematical formulations in contrast to the wordy generalizations that he had criticized 20 years earlier. As both the husband of a Jew and an outspoken critic of the unfair treatment of European minorities, Winkler was promptly fired from both his government and academic positions following the 1938 Nazi annexation of Austria. Despite severe persecution from the Nazi party, he wrote the textbook Basic Course in Demography during the occupation.

=== Later years ===
At the end of the war, he was rehired by the University of Vienna as the first full professor of statistics since 1883, and became Dean of the School of Law and Statecraft from 1950 to 1955. He was also restored as Austria's lead government statistician from 1945 to 1955. Despite these influential positions and growing international recognition, Winkler spent many years defending the statistical department from opposition within the university. The regressive attitude of Austrian and German academics towards statistics as a truly independent discipline meant that his contributions to international developments became more difficult. He did not retire until age 71, and continued to publish and vigorously promote statistics thereafter. He died just after his 100th birthday, having published 20 textbooks and over 200 papers, founded two statistical societies, edited two statistical journals, been awarded two honorary degrees, and reshaped the development of German-speaking statistics through his progressive education initiatives.
