= Martin Hilský =

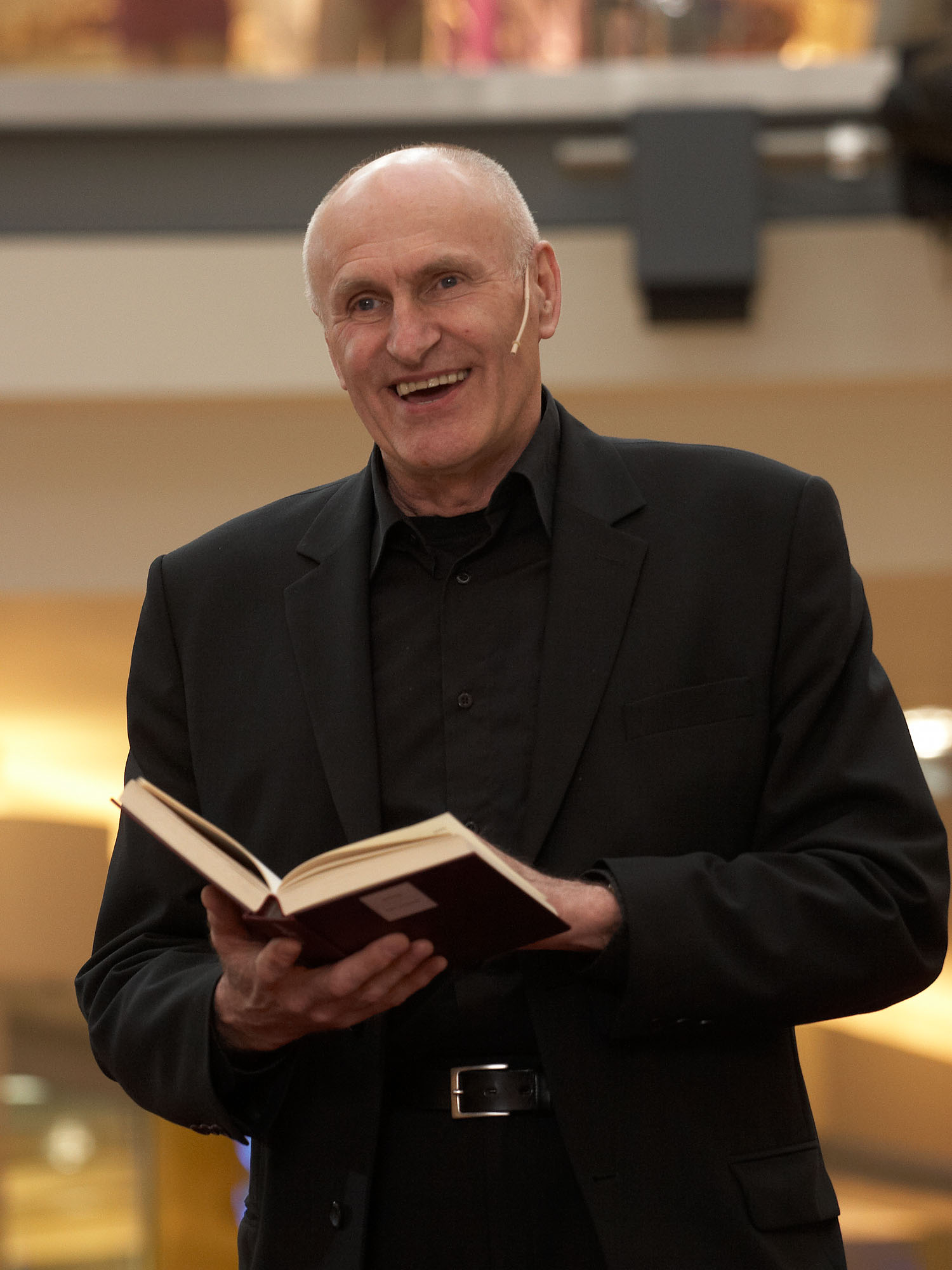
Martin Hilský

Prof. Martin Hilský MBE (born 8 April 1943 in Prague) is professor emeritus of English literature at Charles University in Prague and a translator. He is most acclaimed for his translations into Czech of William Shakespeare's works for which he was awarded the 2011 Czech State Award for Translation. In 2001 he was named an honorary holder of the Order of the British Empire. He has also written extensive prefaces and epilogues for several books.

== Translations ==
- Herbert Ernest Bates: The Darling Buds of May
- Jack Cope: The fair house
- T. S. Eliot: On Poetry and Poets
- J. G. Farrell: Troubles
- Ring Lardner: The Best Short Stories of Ring Lardner
- D. H. Lawrence: Women in Love
- John Milton: Paradise Lost
- Thomas N. Scortia: The Prometheus Crisis (with Kateřina Hilská, his wife)
- Peter Shaffer: Amadeus
- William Shakespeare: Hamlet, As you like it, King Lear, Macbeth, Love's Labour's Lost, Othello, A Midsummer Night's Dream, Sonnets, Twelfth Night, or What You Will, Antony and Cleopatra, The Tempest, Cymbeline, The Comedy of Errors, The Merchant of Venice, Much Ado About Nothing, Pericles, Prince of Tyre, The Merry Wives of Windsor, The Winter's Tale, The Taming of the Shrew
- John Steinbeck: Cannery Row, Tortilla Flat
- John Millington Synge: The Playboy of the Western World
