= Stanislav Segert =

Stanislav Segert (May 4, 1921 – September 30, 2005) was a prominent scholar of Semitic languages and one of the foremost authorities on North-West Semitic languages.

== Life ==
Born in Prague, then Czechoslovakia, Segert began his studies at the Protestant Theological Faculty of Charles University in 1939 while also signing up for courses at the Faculty of Arts. When later that year the Nazi occupation authorities closed down all universities, Stanislav Segert completed his studies in various illegal courses and in 1943, he was ordained as a chaplain of the Evangelical church of Czech Brethren. From 1945-1947, Segert pursued his graduate studies at the Faculty of Arts and was awarded a degree of Doctor of Philosophy in Semitic and Classical philology and philosophy. Between 1945 and 1952, he was an assistant lecturer at the Protestant Theological Faculty, mostly teaching courses in Greek and Latin. In 1951, he started teaching at the Faculty of Arts and in 1952, he became a member of the Oriental Institute of the newly established Czechoslovak Academy of Sciences. In 1969, following the government repressions in the wake of the 1968 Soviet invasion of Czechoslovakia, he left for the United States where he became a Professor of North-West Semitic languages at the University of California, Los Angeles.

== Works ==
- 1976: A Grammar of Phoenician and Punic. Munich: Beck. ISBN 3-406-00724-4
- 1985: A Basic Grammar of Ugaritic Language. Berkeley: University of California Press. ISBN 0-520-03999-8
- 1986: Altaramäische Grammatik: mit Bibliographie, Chrestomathie und Glossar (4. Auflage). Leipzig: VEB Verlag Enzyklopädie. ISBN 3-324-00123-4.

== Festschriften ==
Sopher Mahir: Northwest Semitic Studies Presented to Stanislav Segert. Edited by Edward M. Cook. Winona Lake, Indiana: Eisenbrauns, 1990 ( = Maarav: A Journal for the Study of the Northwest Semitic Languages and Literatures, vols. 5-6, 1990). The volume includes a comprehensive bibliography of Segert's work up to the date of publication.
