= Vera Nikodem =

Czechoslovak-American molecular biologist (1940–2018)

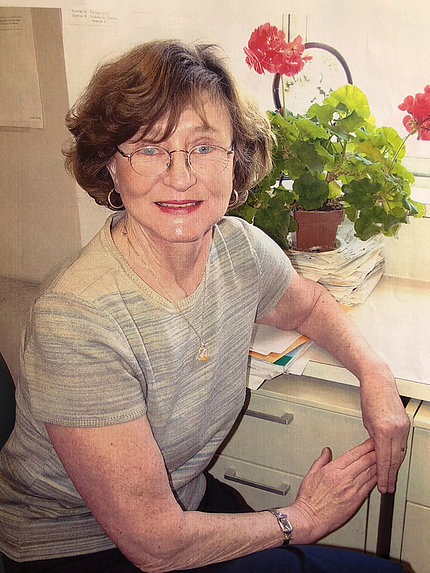
- Born: 1940; Czechoslovakia
- Died: May 17, 2018 (age 78); Washington, D.C., U.S.
- Education: Charles University; Rutgers University
- Children: 2
- Scientific career
- Fields: Molecular biology
- Workplaces: National Institutes of Health
- Doctoral advisor: Walter W. Wainio

Vera Marie Nikodem (1940-May 17, 2018) was a Czechoslovak-American molecular biologist who served as a section chief at the National Institute of Diabetes and Digestive and Kidney Diseases.

== Life ==
Nikodem was born in 1940 in the former Czechoslovakia during World War II. She graduated from Charles University in 1962 with degrees in chemistry and biology. She escaped communism and moved to the United States in 1967 to join her husband, Zdenek Nikodem who was pursuing graduate studies at Princeton University. Nikodem earned her Ph.D. in biochemistry at Rutgers University in 1975. Her dissertation was titled, The isolation, purification, and characterization of mammalian cytochrome b. Walter W. Wainio was her doctoral advisor. She completed postdoctoral research at Princeton.

Nikodem and her family moved to the Washington, D.C., area in 1978 and Nikodem began her 30-year career as a molecular biologist at the National Institutes of Health (NIH), culminating as a section chief at National Institute of Diabetes and Digestive and Kidney Diseases (NIDDK).

Nikodem retired in 2008 and spent her time in both Georgetown and at her second home in Breckenridge, Colorado. She died on May 17, 2018, at Sibley Memorial Hospital at the age of 78, after a brief battle with acute myeloid leukemia. Nikodem was survived by her husband of 53 years, Zdenek Nikodem, sons David and Gregory, daughters-in-law Mary and Bridget and six grandchildren.
