= Charles University =

Oldest and largest university in the Czech Republic

- Univerzita Karlova
- Latin: Universitas Carolina
- Former name: University of Prague (Latin: Universitas Pragensis)
- Type: Public, ancient
- Established: 26 January 1347; 679 years ago
- Affiliations: 4EU+ Alliance; Coimbra Group; EUA; Europaeum; UNICA
- Budget: CZK 8.9 billion
- Rector: Jiří Zima
- Faculty: 4,057
- Administrative staff: 4,026
- Students: 51,438
- Undergraduates: 32,520
- Postgraduates: 9,288
- Doctoral students: 7,428
- Location: Prague, Czech Republic; 50°05′18″N 14°24′13″E
- Campus: Urban
Colors
- Website: cuni.cz

Charles University (CUNI; Czech: Univerzita Karlova, UK; Latin: Universitas Carolina; German: Karls-Universität), also known historically as the University of Prague (Latin: Universitas Pragensis), is the largest university in the Czech Republic. It is one of the oldest universities in the world in continuous operation, and the third oldest university north of the Alps (after the University of Oxford and University of Cambridge) and east of Paris. Today, the university consists of 17 faculties located in Prague, Hradec Králové, and Plzeň.

== History ==
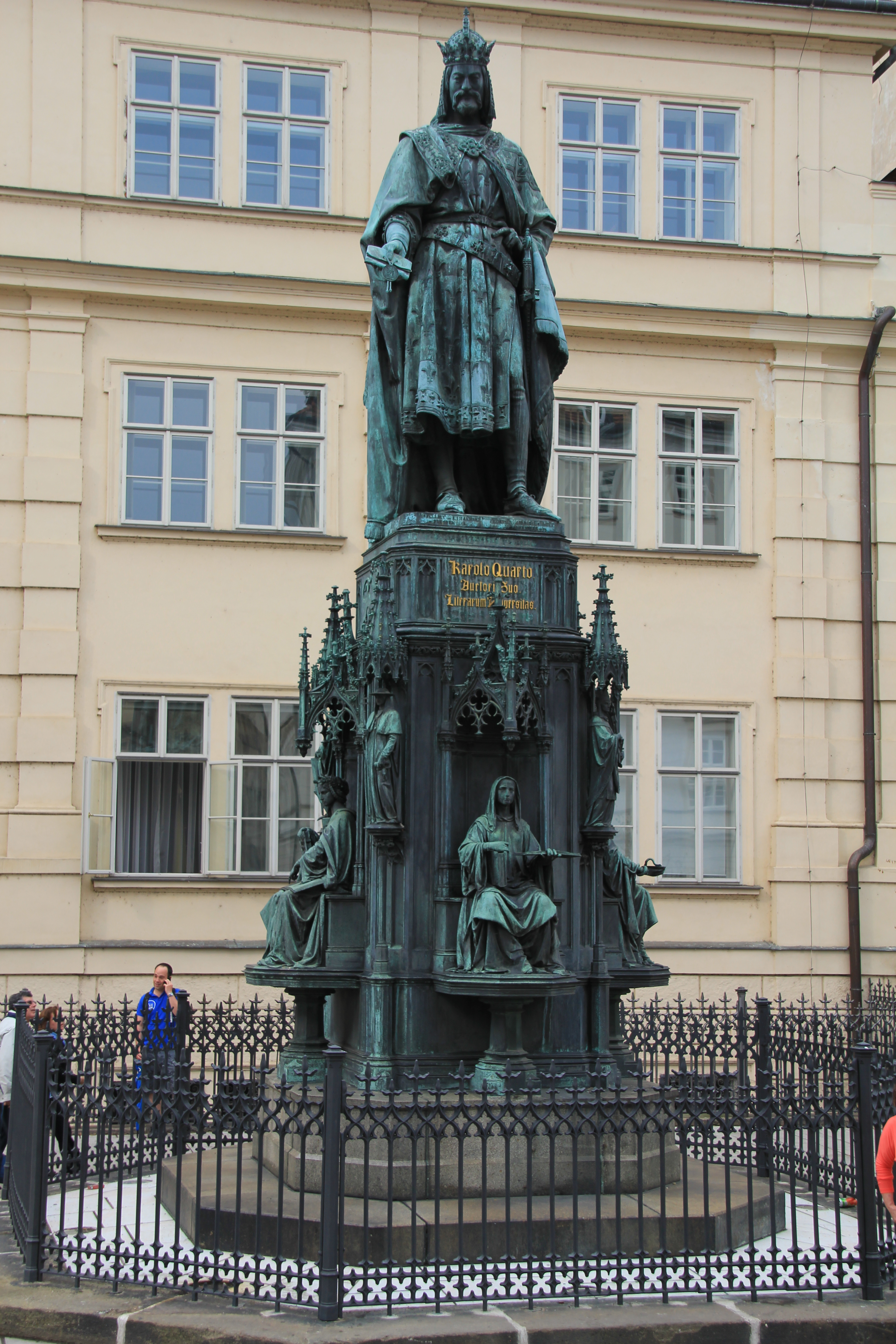
Monument to the protector of the university, Emperor Charles IV, in Prague (built in 1848)

=== Medieval university (1349–1419) ===
The establishment of a medieval university in Prague was inspired by Holy Roman Emperor Charles IV. He requested his friend and ally, Pope Clement VI, to create the university. On 26 January 1347, the pope issued the bull establishing a university in Prague, modeled on the University of Paris, with all four faculties, including theology. On 7 April 1348 Charles, the king of Bohemia, gave to the established university privileges and immunities from the secular power in a Golden Bull and on 14 January 1349 he repeated that as the king of the Romans. Most Czech sources since the 19th century—encyclopedias, general histories, materials of the university itself—prefer to give 1348 as the year of the founding of the university, rather than 1347 or 1349. That was caused by an anticlerical shift in the 19th century, shared by both Czechs and Germans.

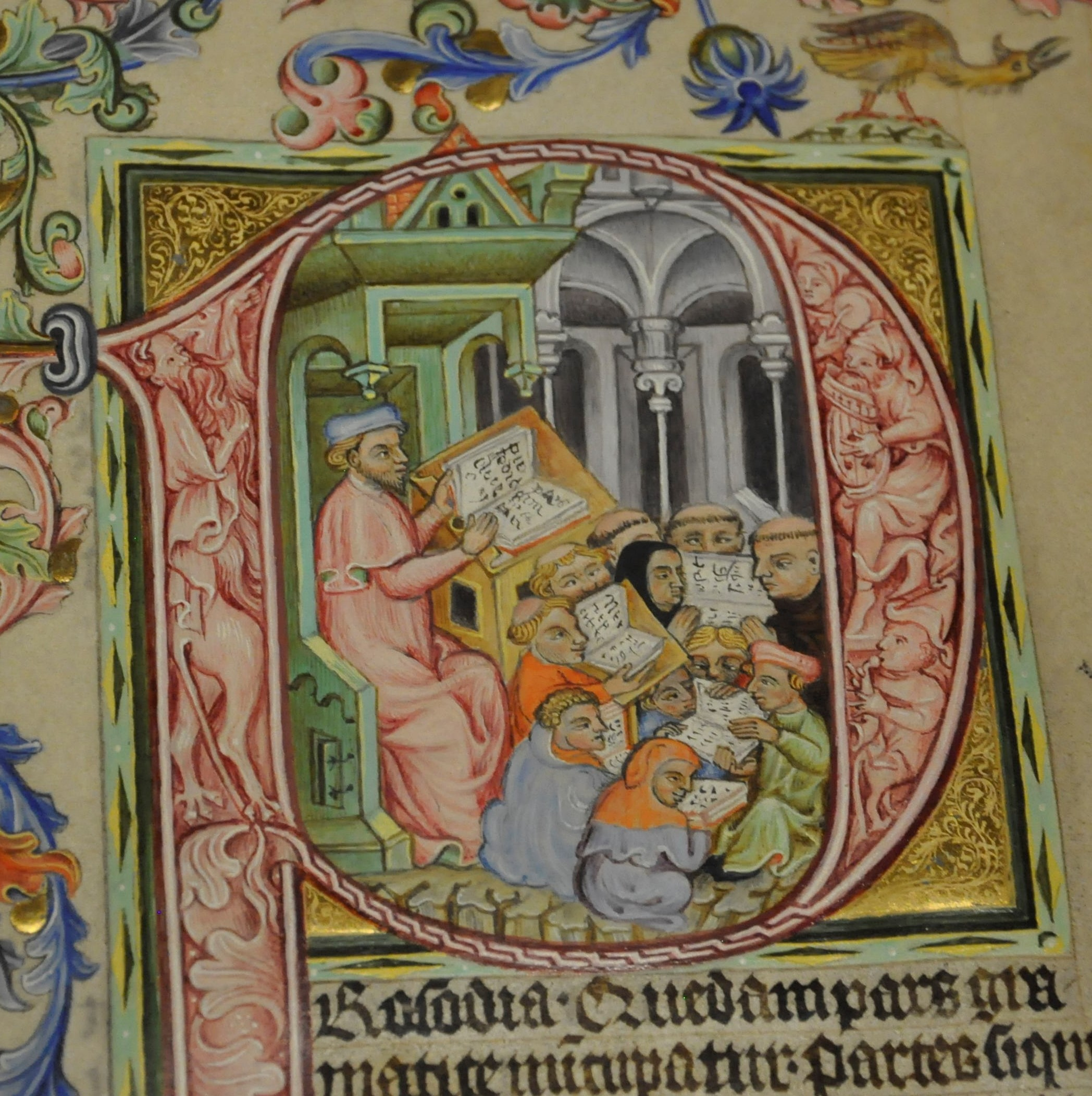
Teacher and students shown in a medieval manuscript from Bohemia

The university was opened in 1349. The university was sectioned into parts called nations: the Bohemian, Bavarian, Polish and Saxon. The Bohemian natio included Bohemians, Moravians, southern Slavs, and Hungarians; the Bavarian included Austrians, Swabians, natives of Franconia and of the Rhine provinces; the Polish included Silesians, Poles, Ruthenians; the Saxon included inhabitants of the Margravate of Meissen, Thuringia, Upper and Lower Saxony, Denmark, and Sweden. Ethnically Czech students made 16–20% of all students. Archbishop Arnošt of Pardubice took an active part in the foundation by obliging the clergy to contribute and became a chancellor of the university (i.e., director or manager).

The first graduate was promoted in 1359. The lectures were held in the colleges, of which the oldest was named for the king the Carolinum, established in 1366. In 1372 the Faculty of Law became an independent university.

In 1402 Jerome of Prague in Oxford copied out the Dialogus and Trialogus of John Wycliffe. The dean of the philosophical faculty, Jan Hus, translated Trialogus into the Czech language. In 1403 the university forbade its members to follow the teachings of Wycliffe, but his doctrine continued to gain in popularity.

In the Western Schism, the Bohemian nation took the side of king Wenceslaus and supported the Council of Pisa (1409). The other nations of the university declared their support for the side of Pope Gregory XII, thus the vote was 1:3 against the Bohemians. Hus and other Bohemians, though, took advantage of Wenceslaus' opposition to Gregory. By the Decree of Kutná Hora (German: Kuttenberg) on 18 January 1409, the king subverted the university constitution by granting the Bohemian masters three votes. Only a single vote was left for all other three nations combined, compared to one vote per each nation before. The result of this coup was the emigration of foreign (mostly German) professors and students, founding the University of Leipzig in May 1409. Before that, in 1408, the university had about 200 doctors and Masters, 500 bachelors, and 30,000 students; it now lost a large part of this number, accounts of the loss varying from 5000 to 20,000 including 46 professors.

In the autumn of 1409, Hus was elected rector of the now Czech-dominated rump university. The university became a bastion of the Hussite movement and mostly a regional institution. Soon, in 1419, the faculties of theology and law disappeared, and only the faculty of arts remained in existence.

=== Protestant academy (1419–1622) ===
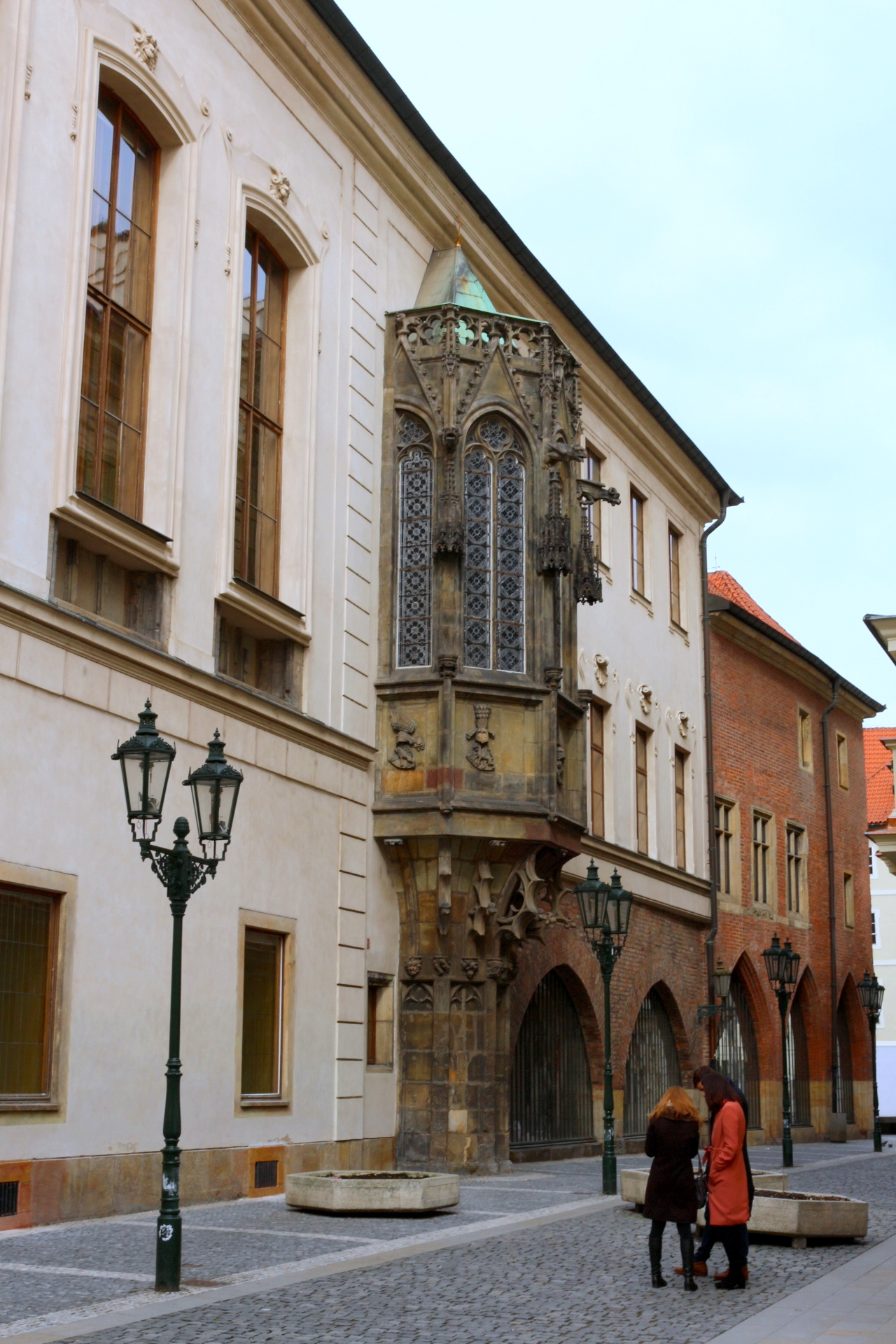
Karolinum – the oldest building of Charles University built in the 14th century

The faculty of arts became a centre of the Hussite movement, and the chief doctrinal authority of the Utraquists. No degrees were given in the years 1417–30; at times there were only eight or nine professors. Emperor Sigismund, son of Charles IV, took what was left into his personal property and some progress was made. The emperor Ferdinand I called the Jesuits to Prague and in 1562 they opened an academy—the Clementinum. From 1541 till 1558 the Czech humanist Mattheus Collinus (1516–1566) was a professor of Greek language. Some progress was made again when the emperor Rudolph II took up residence in Prague. In 1609 the obligatory celibacy of the professors was abolished. In 1616 the Jesuit Academy became a university. (It could award academic degrees.)

Jesuits were expelled 1618–1621 during the early stages of the Thirty Years' War, which was started in Prague by anti-Catholic and anti-Imperial Bohemians. By 1622, the Jesuits had a predominant influence over the emperor. An Imperial decree of 19 September 1622 gave the Jesuits supreme control over the entire school system of Bohemia, Moravia, and Silesia. The last four professors at the Carolinum resigned, and all of the Carolinum and nine colleges went to the Jesuits. The right of handing out degrees, of holding chancellorships, and of appointing the secular professors was also granted to the Jesuits.

=== Charles-Ferdinand University (1622–1882) ===
Cardinal Ernst Adalbert of Harrach actively opposed the union of the university with another institution, the withdrawal of the archiepiscopal right to the chancellorship, and prevented the drawing up of the Golden Bull for the confirmation of the grant to Jesuits. Cardinal Ernst funded the Collegium Adalbertinum, and in 1638, Emperor Ferdinand III limited the teaching monopoly enjoyed by the Jesuits. He took from them the rights, properties and archives of the Carolinum making the university once more independent under an imperial protector. During the last years of the Thirty Years' War the Charles Bridge in Prague was courageously defended by students of the Carolinum and Clementinum. Since 1650, those who received any degrees took an oath to maintain the Immaculate Conception of the Blessed Virgin, which has been renewed annually.

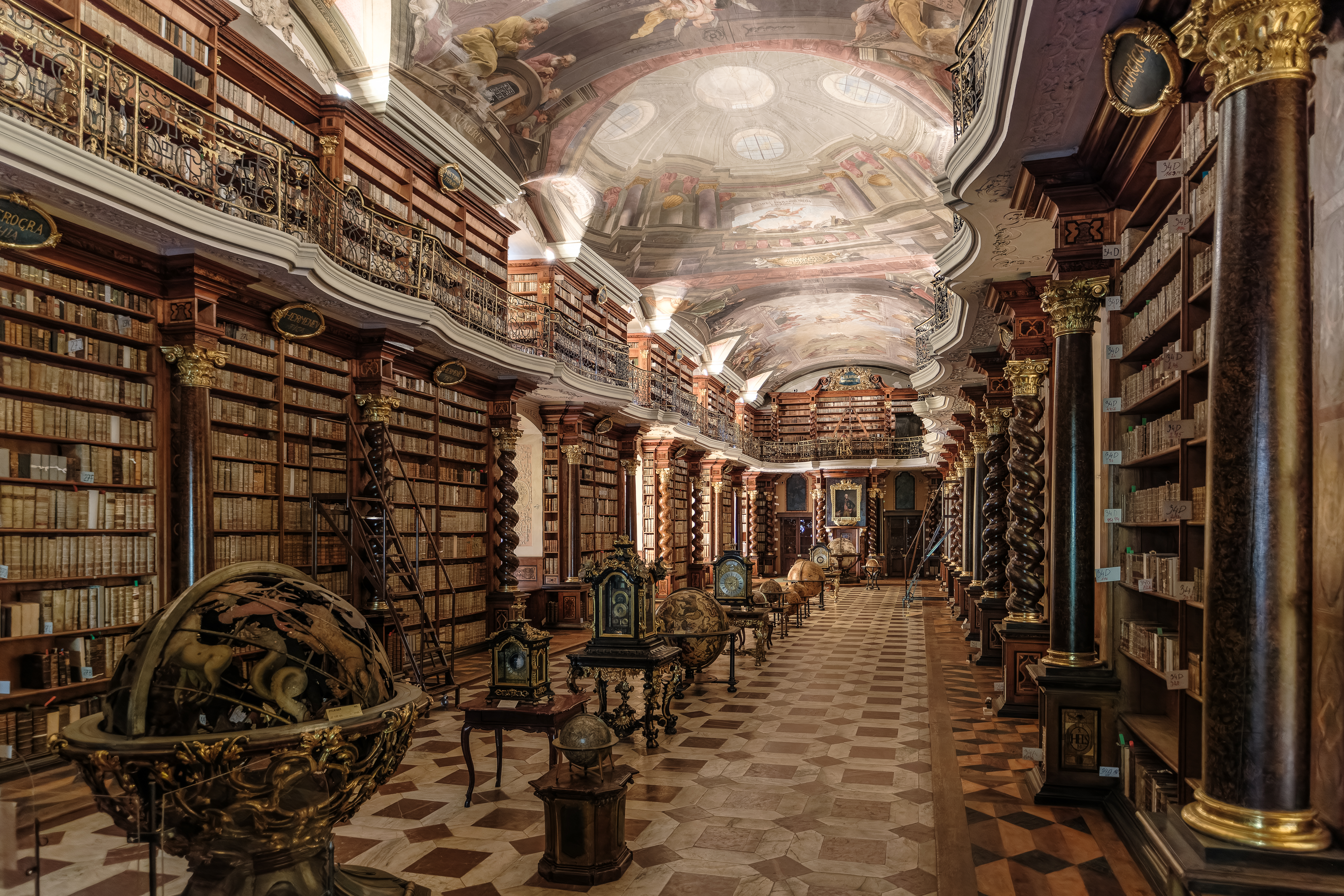
Baroque library hall in Clementinum, which originally belonged to the university, today part of National Library of the Czech Republic

On 23 February 1654, emperor Ferdinand III merged Carolinum and Clementinum and created a single university with four faculties:Charles-Ferdinand University (Latin: Universitatis Carolinae Ferdinandeae). Carolinum had at that time only the faculty of arts, as the only faculty surviving the period of the Hussite Wars. The dilapidated Carolinum was rebuilt in 1718 at the expense of the state.

The rebuilding and the bureaucratic reforms of universities in the Habsburg monarchy in 1752 and 1754 deprived the university of many of its former privileges. In 1757 a Dominican and an Augustinian were appointed to give theological instruction. However, there was a gradual introduction of enlightened reforms, and this process culminated at the end of the century when even non-Catholics were granted the right to study. On 29 July 1784, German replaced Latin as the language of instruction. For the first time Protestants were allowed, and soon after Jews. The university acknowledged the need for a Czech language and literature chair. Emperor Leopold II established it by a courtly decree on 28 October 1791. On 15 May 1792, scholar and historian Franz Martin Pelzel was named the professor of the chair. He started his lectures on 13 March 1793.

In the revolution of 1848, German and Czech students fought for the addition of the Czech language at the Charles-Ferdinand University as a language of lectures. Due to the demographic changes of the 19th century, Prague ceased to have a German-language majority around 1860. By 1863, 22 lecture courses were held in Czech, the remainder (out of 187) in German. In 1864, Germans suggested the creation of a separate Czech university. Czech professors rejected this because they did not wish to lose the continuity of university traditions.

=== Split into Czech and German universities ===
It soon became clear that neither the German-speaking Bohemians nor the Czechs were satisfied with the bilingual arrangement that the university had established after the revolutions of 1848. The Czechs also refused to support the idea of the reinstitution of the 1349 student nations, instead declaring their support for the idea of keeping the university together, but dividing it into separate colleges, one German and one Czech. This would allow both Germans and Czechs to retain the collective traditions of the university. German-speakers, however, quickly vetoed this proposal, preferring a pure German university: they proposed to split Charles-Ferdinand University into two separate institutions.

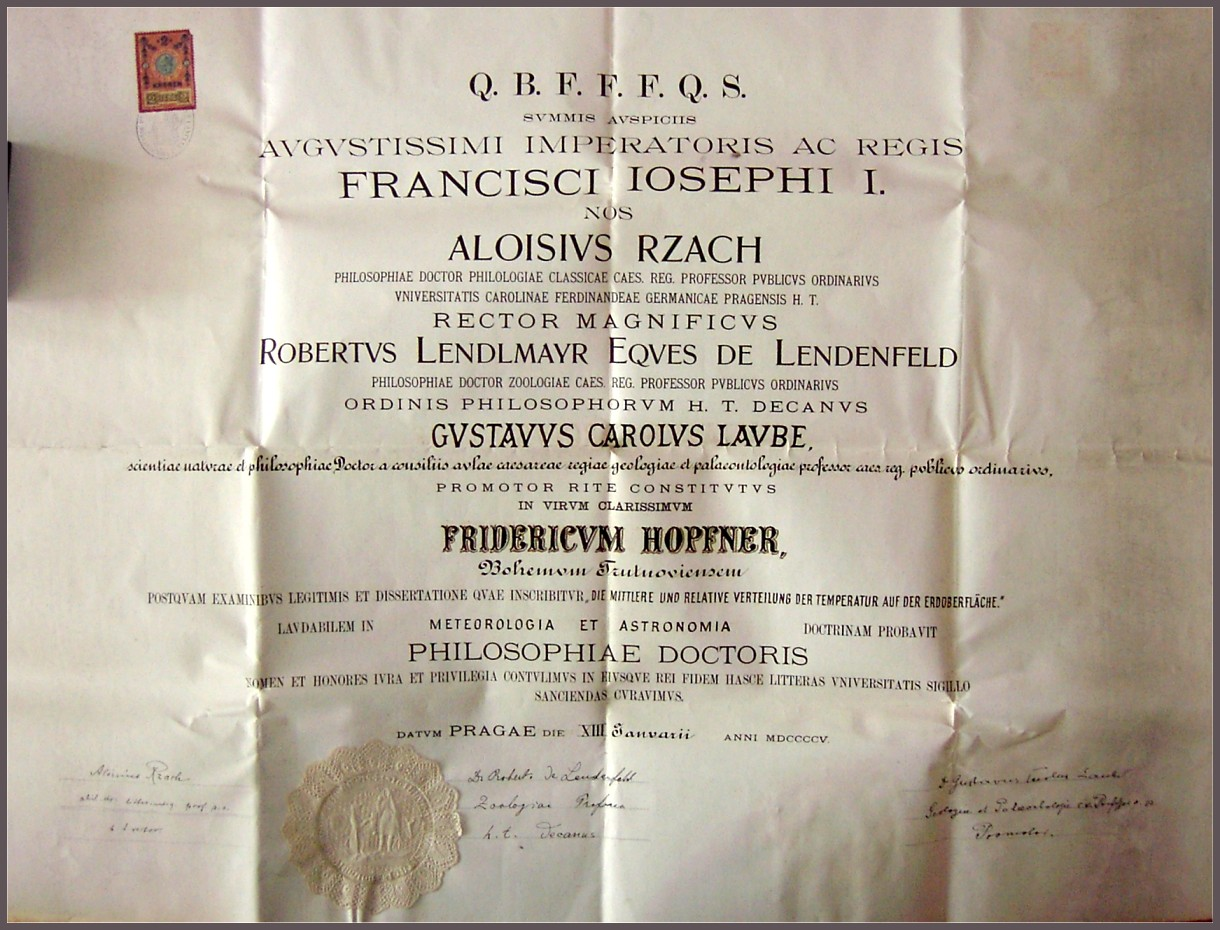
Doctoral diploma of Friedrich Hopfner, issued 1905 by the German Charles-Ferdinand University in Prague

After long negotiations, Charles-Ferdinand was divided into German Charles-Ferdinand University (German: Deutsche Karl-Ferdinands-Universität) and Czech Charles-Ferdinand University (Czech: Česká universita Karlo-Ferdinandova) by an act of the Cisleithanian Imperial Council, which Emperor Franz Joseph sanctioned on 28 February 1882. Each section was entirely independent of the other, and enjoyed equal status. The two universities shared medical and scientific institutes, the old insignia, aula, library, and botanical garden, but common facilities were administered by the German University. The first rector of the Czech University became Václav Vladivoj Tomek.

In 1890, the Royal and Imperial Czech Charles-Ferdinand University had 112 teachers and 2,191 students and the Royal and Imperial German Charles-Ferdinand University had 146 teachers and 1,483 students. Both universities had three faculties; the Theological Faculty remained the common until 1891, when it was divided as well. In the winter semester of 1909–10 the German Charles-Ferdinand University had 1,778 students; these were divided into: 58 theological students, for both the secular priesthood and religious orders; 755 law students; 376 medical; 589 philosophical. Among the students were about 80 women. The professors were divided as follows: theology, 7 regular professors, 1 assistant professor, 1 docent; law, 12 regular professors, 2 assistant professors, 4 docents; medicine, 15 regular professors, 19 assistant, 30 docents; philosophy, 30 regular professors, 8 assistant, 19 docents, 7 lecturers. The Czech Charles-Ferdinand University in the winter semester of 1909–10 included 4,319 students; of these 131 were theological students belonging both to the secular and regular clergy; 1,962 law students; 687 medical; 1,539 philosophical; 256 students were women. The professors were divided as follows: theological faculty, 8 regular professors, 2 docents; law, 12 regular, 7 assistant professors, 12 docents; medicine, 16 regular professors, 22 assistant, 24 docents; philosophy, 29 regular, 16 assistant, 35 docents, 11 lecturers.

The high point of the German University was the era preceding the First World War, when it was home to world-renowned scientists such as physicist and philosopher Ernst Mach, Moritz Winternitz and Albert Einstein. In addition, the German-language students included prominent individuals such as future writers Max Brod, Franz Kafka, and Johannes Urzidil. The "Lese- und Redehalle der deutschen Studenten in Prag" ("Reading and Lecture Hall of the German students in Prague"), founded in 1848, was an important social and scientific centre. Their library contained in 1885 more than 23,519 books and offered 248 scientific journals, 19 daily newspapers, 49 periodicals and 34 papers of entertainment. Regular lectures were held to scientific and political themes.

Even before the Austro-Hungarian Empire was abolished in late 1918, to be succeeded by Czechoslovakia, Czech politicians demanded that the insignia of 1348 were exclusively to be kept by the Czech university. The Act No. 197/1919 Sb. z. a n. established the Protestant Theological Faculty, but not as a part of the Charles University. (That changed on 10 May 1990, when it finally became a faculty of the university.)

In 1920, the so-called Lex Mareš (No. 135/1920 Sb. z. a n.) was issued, named for its initiator, professor of physiology František Mareš, which determined that the Czech university was to be the successor to the original university. Dropping the Habsburg name Ferdinand, it designated itself Charles University, while the German university was not named in the document, and then became officially called the German University in Prague (German: Deutsche Universität Prag).

In 1921, the German-speaking Bohemians considered moving their university to Liberec (German: Reichenberg), in northern Bohemia. In 1930, about 42,000 inhabitants of Prague spoke German as their native language, while millions lived in northern, southern and western Bohemia, in Czech Silesia and parts of Moravia near the borders with Austria and Germany.

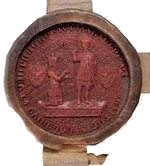
The insignia of the university; bone of contention between the universities

In October 1932, after Naegle's death, the Czechs started again a controversy over the insignia. Ethnic tensions intensified, although some professors of the German University were members of the Czechoslovak government. Any agreement to use the insignia for both the universities was rejected. On 21 November 1934, the German University had to hand over the insigniae to the Czechs. The German University senate sent a delegation to Minister of Education Krčmář to protest the writ. At noon on 24 November 1934, several thousand students of the Czech University protested in front of the German university building. The Czech rector Karel Domin gave a speech urging the crowd to attack, while the outnumbered German students tried to resist. Under the threat of violence, on 25 November 1934 rector Otto Grosser (1873–1951) handed over the insigniae. These troubles of 1934 harmed relations between the two universities and nationalities.

The tide turned in 1938 when, following the Munich Agreement, German troops entered the border areas of Czechoslovakia (the so-called Sudetenland), as did Polish and Hungarian troops elsewhere. On 15 March 1939 Germans forced Czecho-Slovakia to split apart and the Czech lands were occupied by Nazis as the Protectorate of Bohemia and Moravia. Reichsprotektor Konstantin von Neurath handed the historical insigniae to the German University, which was officially renamed Deutsche Karls-Universität in Prag. On 1 September 1939 the German University was subordinated to the Reich Ministry of Education in Berlin and on 4 November 1939 it was proclaimed to be Reichsuniversität.

On 28 October 1939, during a demonstration, Jan Opletal was shot. His burial on 15 November 1939 became another demonstration. On 17 November 1939 (now marked as International Students' Day) the Czech University and all other Czech institutions of higher learning were closed, remaining closed until the end of the War. Nine student leaders were executed and about 1,200 Czech students were interned in Sachsenhausen and not released until 1943. About 20 or 35 interned students died in the camp. On 8 May 1940 the Czech University was officially renamed Czech Charles University (Czech: Česká universita Karlova) by government regulation 188/1940 Coll.

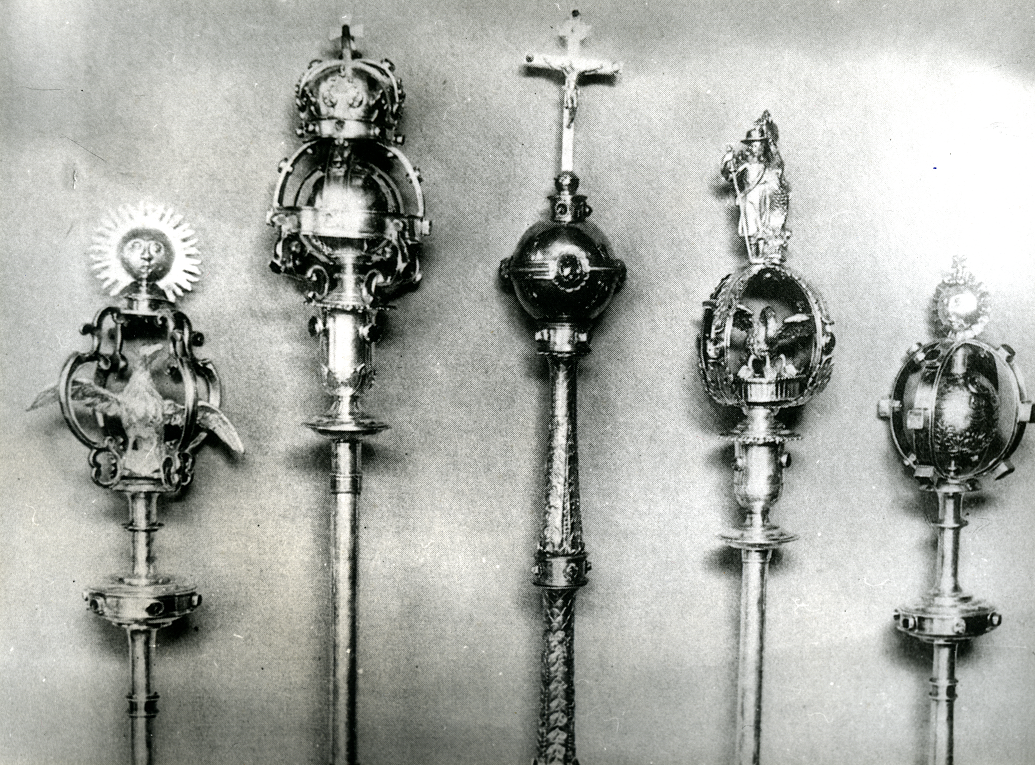
Detail of the stolen insignia of Charles University. From left: Sceptre of the Faculty of Theology, the Faculty of Law, the sceptre of the Rector, the sceptre of the Faculty of Medicine and the Faculty of Philosophy.

The Second World War marks the end of the coexistence of the two universities in Prague. With the expulsion of Germans from Czechoslovakia at the end of the war, the German-speaking Charles-Ferdinand University was dissolved and many of its members were expelled. In 1956, they were allowed to establish a new Collegium Carolinum in Munich.

In 1945 the insignia of the university (the rector's chain, the scepters of the individual faculties, the university seal and also the founding documents and other historical documents) vanished. None of these historical objects has been found to this day.

=== Present-day university (since 1945) ===
Although the university began to recover rapidly after 1945, it did not enjoy academic freedom for long. After the communist coup in 1948, the new regime started to arrange purges and repress all forms of disagreement with the official ideology, and continued to do so for the next four decades, with the second wave of purges during the normalization period in the beginning of the 1970s.

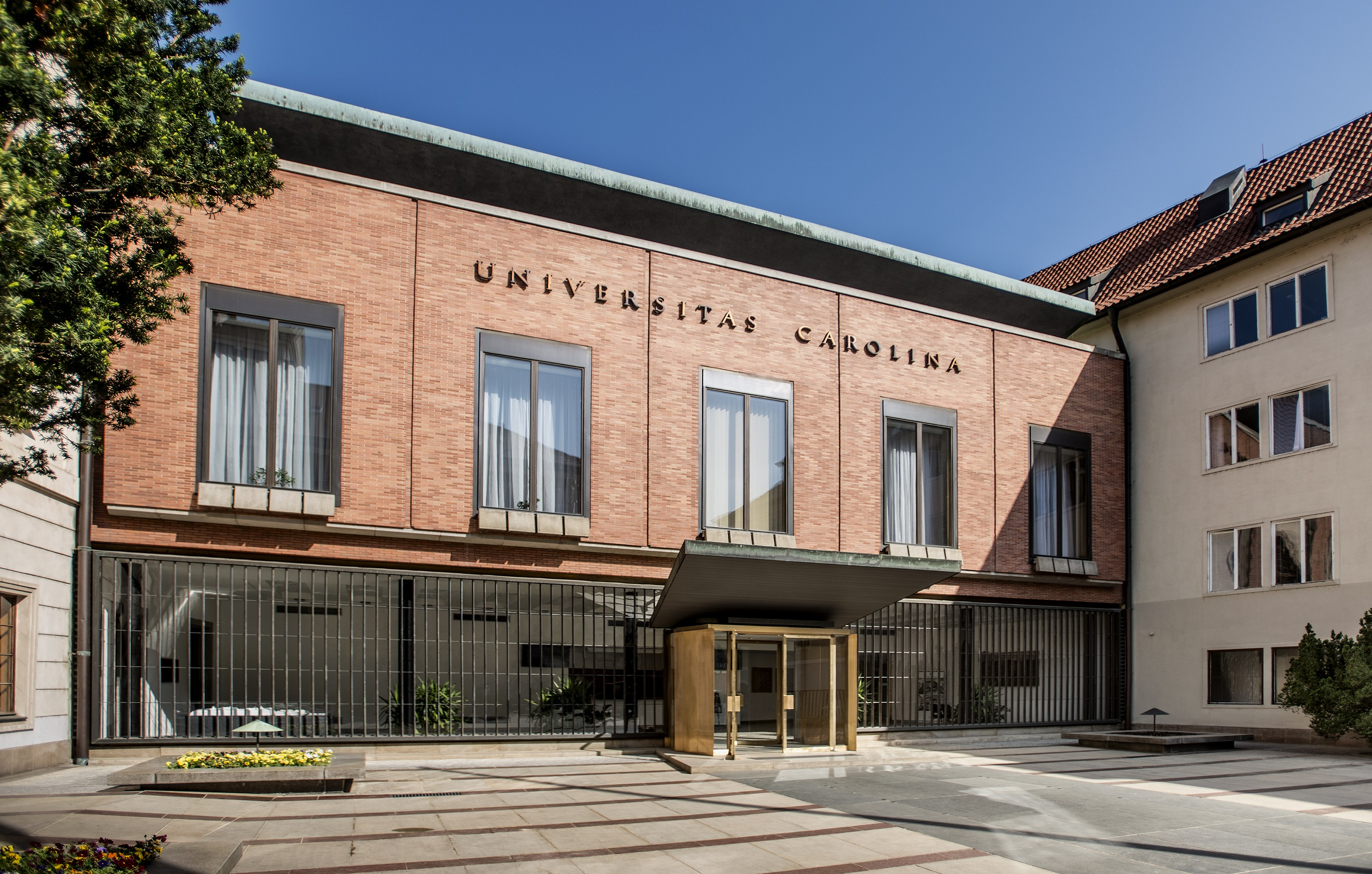
Façade of the entrance to Karolinum, the centre of Charles University

Only in the late 1980s did the situation start to improve; students organized various activities and several peaceful demonstrations in the wake of the Revolutions of 1989 abroad. This initiated the Velvet Revolution in 1989, in which both students and faculty of the university played a large role. Václav Havel, a writer, dramatist and philosopher, was recruited from the independent academic community and appointed president of the republic in December 1989.

Since 26 January 2022, Prof. Milena Králíčková is the first woman rector of the Charles University.

On 21 December 2023, a mass shooting occurred at the university. 14 people were killed, and 25 others were wounded. The 24-year-old perpetrator then killed himself. Before the shooting at the university, the perpetrator killed his father at their home in Hostouň. He was also identified as the person responsible for the murders of a man and his two-month-old daughter in Klánovice Forest six days earlier on 15 December.

== Location ==
Charles University does not have one joint campus. The university's faculties are located in Prague, Hradec Králové, Plzeň and Brandýs nad Labem. The Institute for Language and Preparatory Studies has teaching centres in Dobruška, Mariánské Lázně, Poděbrady and Zahrádky (near Česká Lípa). The Charles University Archive and Depository are located in Lešetice.

University buildings and compounds are scattered throughout Prague – in the Old Town (Faculty of Arts, Faculty of Humanities), the New Town (First Faculty of Medicine, Faculty of Science, Faculty of Mathematics and Physics), Břevnov (halls of residence), Veleslavín (Faculty of Physical Education and Sport), Libeň (Faculty of Mathematics and Physics, halls of residence), and Hostivař (halls of residence, sports centre).

The oldest building at Charles University Karolinum is situated in the Old Town of Prague and constitutes the university's center. It is the seat of the rector and of the Academic Senate of Charles university. Carolinum is also the venue for official academic ceremonies such as matriculations or graduations. It was dedicated to the university by the Czech king Wenceslas IV in 1386 and has been serving the university ever since.

Its academic publishing house is Karolinum Press and the university also operates several museums. The Botanical Garden of Charles University, maintained by its Faculty of Science, is located in the New Town.

== Organisation ==
=== Faculties ===
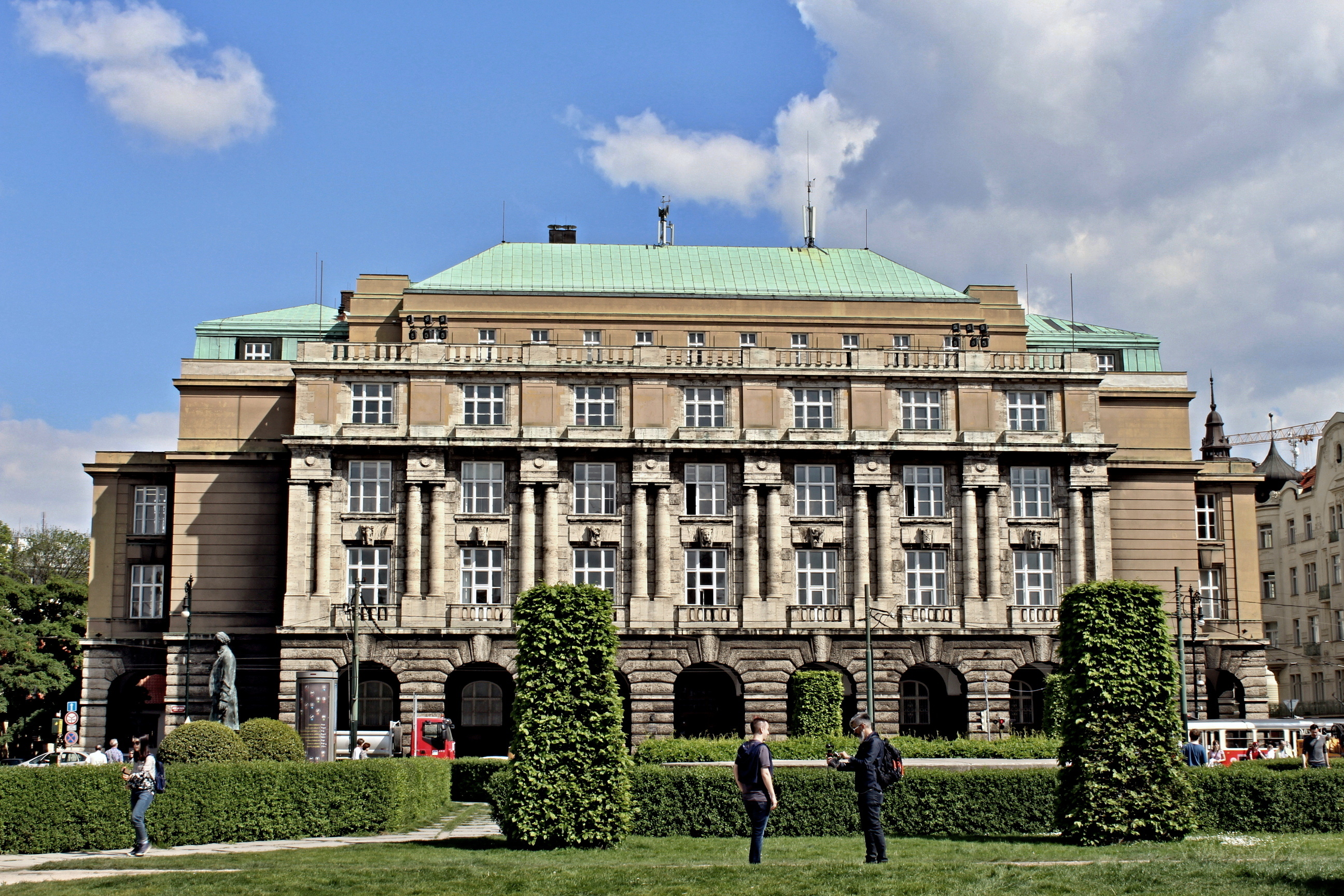
Faculty of Arts, Charles University in Prague

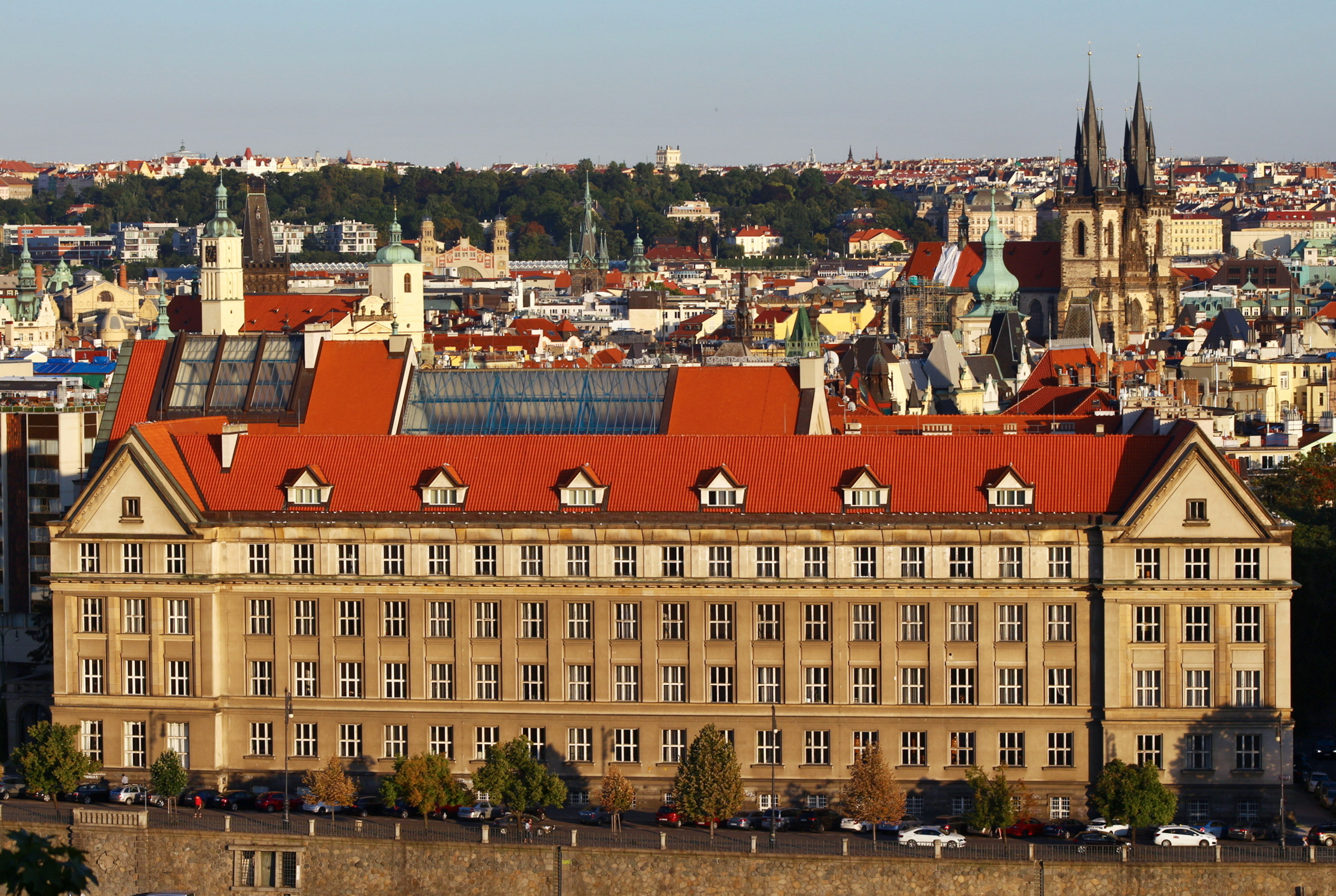
Faculty of Law, Charles University in Prague

Among the four original faculties of Charles University were: the faculty of law, medicine, art (philosophy) and theology (now catholic theology). Today, Charles University consists of 17 faculties, based primarily in Prague, two houses in Hradec Králové and one in Plzeň.

- Catholic Theological Faculty
- Protestant Theological Faculty
- Hussite Theological Faculty
- Faculty of Law
- First Faculty of Medicine
- Second Faculty of Medicine
- Third Faculty of Medicine
- Faculty of Medicine in Plzeň
- Faculty of Medicine in Hradec Králové
- Faculty of Pharmacy in Hradec Králové
- Faculty of Arts
- Faculty of Science
- Faculty of Mathematics and Physics
- Faculty of Education
- Faculty of Social Sciences
- Faculty of Physical Education and Sport
- Faculty of Humanities

=== Academic Institutes ===
- Institute of the History of Charles University and Archive of Charles University
- Center for Theoretical Study
- Center for Economic Research and Graduate Education (CERGE-EI) together with Czech Academy of Sciences
- Environment Center

=== Other units ===
- Computer Science Centre
- Centre for Transfer of Knowledge and Technology
- Institute for Language and Preparatory Studies
- Central Library of Charles University
- Agency of the Council of Higher Education Institutions

=== Joint research centres of Charles University and the Czech Academy of Sciences ===
- BIOCEV
- Centre for Biblical Studies
- Centre for Medieval Studies
- Center for Theoretical Study

=== Subsidiary companies ===
- Charles University Innovations Prague (technology transfer office)
- Charles Games (video game development and distribution)
- LAM-X (nanomaterials development)
- GeneSpector (development and distribution of kits for the diagnosis of COVID-19 and other viral agents)
- FlexiCare (implementation of telerehabilitation systems)
- GeneSpector Innovations (development and distribution of technologies for medical diagnostics)

== Rankings ==
University rankings

Global – Overall
- ARWU World: 301–400 (2025)
- CWTS World: 197 (2022)
- QS World: =265 (2026)
- THE World: 401–500 (2024)
- USNWR Global: 226 (2023)

Regional – Overall
- QS Emerging Europe and Central Asia: 2 (2022)
- QS Europe: 79 (2025)

National – Overall
- ARWU National: 1
- QS National: 1
- THE National: 1

Charles University ranks 1st in Eastern Europe in the QS World University Rankings and 246 globally. It was ranked in 2013 as 201–300 best in the World among 500 universities evaluated by Academic Ranking of World Universities, 351–400 among 400 universities in Times Higher Education World University Rankings and 485th in CWTS Leiden Ranking of 500 universities. Earlier rankings are presented in following table.

According to Academic Ranking of World Universities, Charles University ranked in the upper 1.5 percent of the world's best universities in 2011. It came 201st to 300th out of 17,000 universities worldwide. It is the best university in the Czech Republic and one of the best universities in Central and Eastern Europe only overtaken by Russian Lomonosov Moscow State University at 74th place. It was placed 31st in Times BRICS & Emerging Economies Rankings 2014 (after 23rd University of Warsaw).

Rector of the University Václav Hampl said in 2008: "I am very pleased that Charles University achieved such a great success and I would like to thank to all who have contributed to it. An overwhelming majority of schools with a similar placement like Charles University have incomparably better financing and therefore this success is not only a reflection of professional qualities of our academics but also their personal efforts and dedication."

=== Subject rankings ===
According to the QS Subject Ranking, Charles University is among the 150 best universities in the world in geography and linguistics.

QS Subjects	2011	2018	2020	2023	2025
Natural Sciences	174	▼197	▲228	▲161	198
Engineering & Technology	325	▼401–450	401–450	401–450	451–500
Arts & Humanities	184	▼193	▲189	▲143	129
Social Sciences & Management	229	▼302	▲286	▲258	326
Life Sciences & Medicine	250	▲219	▼224	▲177	201
Medicine				151–200	185

Shanghai Subject Fields	2012	2018
Mathematics	151–200	151–200
Physics	151–200	▲76–100

== International cooperation ==
Charles University is a founding member of the 4EU+European University Alliance along with the University of Heidelberg, Sorbonne University and the University of Warsaw and a member of the Coimbra Group, the International Association of Universities and the International Forum of Public Universities. It participates on Erasmus Programme and has numerous inter-university agreements with the universities around the world. In Germany, Charles University cooperates, among others, with the Goethe University Frankfurt. Both cities are linked by a long-lasting partnership agreement.

== People ==
=== Alumni ===
Undivided, before 1882	Czech University (1882–1939 and 1945–present)	German University (1882–1945)
James Bellak, musician; Bernard Bolzano, mathematician and philosopher; Jonas Bondi, rabbi and newspaper editor; Vincenz Czerny, surgeon; Josef Dobrovský, philologist and historian; Samuel Fritz, missionary and cartographer; Anton Gindely, historian; Jan Hus, theologian; Karel Hynek Mácha, poet and writer; Giovanni Kminek-Szedlo, Egyptologist; Jan Marek Marci, physician; Jan Evangelista Purkyně, physiologist; Agustín Stahl, scientist; Jan Štěkna, Cistercian monk; Ferdinand Stoliczka, paleontologist; Matthias of Trakai, Bishop of Vilnius; Jan Erazim Vocel, poet and historian	Václav Bělohradský, philosopher; Antonín Holý, chemist; Bohumila Bednářová, astronomer; Edvard Beneš, sociologist, second president of Czechoslovakia; Adalbert Czerny, paediatrician; Rudolf Rabl, lawyer; Karel Čapek, writer; Eduard Čech, mathematician; Stanislav Grof, psychologist; Jaroslav Heyrovský, chemist; Václav Hlavatý, mathematician; Miroslav Holub, writer and immunologist; Milada Horáková, women's rights activist, freedom-fighter; Bohumil Hrabal, writer; Jan Janský, discoverer of blood types; Charles I of Austria, last emperor of Austria and king of Bohemia; Jan Kavan, politician; Luboš Kohoutek, astronomer; Henry Kučera, linguist and cognitive scientist; Martin Kukučín, Slovak writer; Milan Kundera, writer; Lyubomir Miletich, academician; Vera Nikodem, molecular biologist; Emanuela Nohejlová-Prátová, numismatist; George Placzek, physicist; Jan Stráský, politician; Ota Šik, economist; Andrej Sirácky, sociologist and philosopher; Vladimír Škutina, writer and playwright; Vavro Šrobár, physician and politician; Milan Rastislav Štefánik, astronomer and politician; Peter Tomka, judge; Ivana Trump, socialite and entrepreneur; Vladislav Vančura, writer; Michał Vituška, leader of the Black Cats; Wilhelm Winkler, statistician; David Navara, chess grandmaster; Li Tieying, Chinese politician; Ferdinand Blumentritt, ethnographer; Johann Böhm, chemist; Max Brod, writer; Carl Ferdinand Cori, biochemist; Gerty Cori, biochemist; Carl Friedrich Heinrich Credner; Karl Deutsch, social and political scientist; Viktor Fischl, poet and diplomat; Karl Hermann Frank; Hermann Grab; Erich Heller; Friedrich Hopfner; Franz Hofmeister; Franz Kafka, writer; Egon Erwin Kisch, writer; Wilhelm Klein; Paul Kornfeld; Arthur Mahler; August Leopold von Reuss; Rainer Maria Rilke, poet and writer; Johannes Urzidil, writer and journalist; Felix Weltsch; Max Wertheimer, psychologist; Wolf W. Zuelzer, pediatric pathologist; Vlasta Fialová (archaeologist)	Bernard Hausner, diplomat and member of the Sejm

=== Academics ===
undivided before 1882	Czech University (1882–1939 and 1945–present)	German University (1882–1945)
Matthew of Cracow, theologian, diplomat, bishop of Worms; Jan Gebauer; Anton Gindely; Jan Hus, religious reformer; Jan Jesenius, physician and politician of Slovak origin; Jacob of Mies, theologian of the Bohemian Reformation; Ignatz Mühlwenzel, mathematician and optician; Jan Rokycana, Hussite theologian; František Josef Studnička; Johannes Vodnianus Campanus, playwright; Stanislav Vydra; Bohuslav Balcar; Václav Bělohradský; Edvard Beneš, 2nd president of Czechoslovakia; Eduard Čech; Karel Domin; Miroslav Fiedler; Jan Gebauer; František Graus; Jan Hajič; Eva Hajičová; Václav Hampl; Miroslav Hroch, historian of nationalism; Bedřich Hrozný, orientalist and linguist; Vojtěch Jarník, mathematician; Konstantin Josef Jireček; Erazim Kohák; Karel Kosík; Tomáš Masaryk, philosopher, 1st president of Czechoslovakia; Vilém Mathesius; Josef Matoušek; Jan Měšťák; Jan Mukařovský, literary theorist, linguist; Alois Musil, orientalist; Milan Nakonečný; Jaroslav Nešetřil, mathematician; Jan Patočka, philosopher; Josef Ladislav Píč; Petr Pokorný, theologian; Antonín Rezek; Vojtěch Šafařík; Stanislav Segert; Petr Sgall; František Šmahel; Vaclav Smil; Věra Sokolová; František Josef Studnička; Pavel Tichý; Dušan Třeštík; Petr Vopěnka; Ivan Wilhelm; Zdenek Herman	Friedrich Adler; Alfred Amonn; Gustav Becking; Libuše Dušková; Albert Einstein, theoretical physicist; Phillip Frank, theoretical physicist; Gerhard Gentzen; Heinrich Hilgenreiner; Martin Hilský; Otto Kahler; Aleš Klégr, linguist; Gustav Karl Laube; Ernst Mach, theoretical physicist; Günther von Mannagetta und Lërchenau Beck; Hans Petersson; Josef Pfitzner, Nazi politician and historian; Ernst Pringsheim; Ernst Pringsheim Jr.; Justin Quinn, poet, translator, literary critic; Friedrich Reinitzer, botanist and chemist, discoverer of liquid crystals; Samuel Friedrich Stein; Friedrich Weleminsky; Moritz Winternitz; Alfred Woltmann	Hans Kelsen, jurist, legal philosopher and political philosopher

== See also ==
- CDE Poděbrady
- List of Charles University rectors
- List of medieval universities
