= Giovanni Kminek-Szedlo =

Czech-Italian Egyptologist (1828–1896)

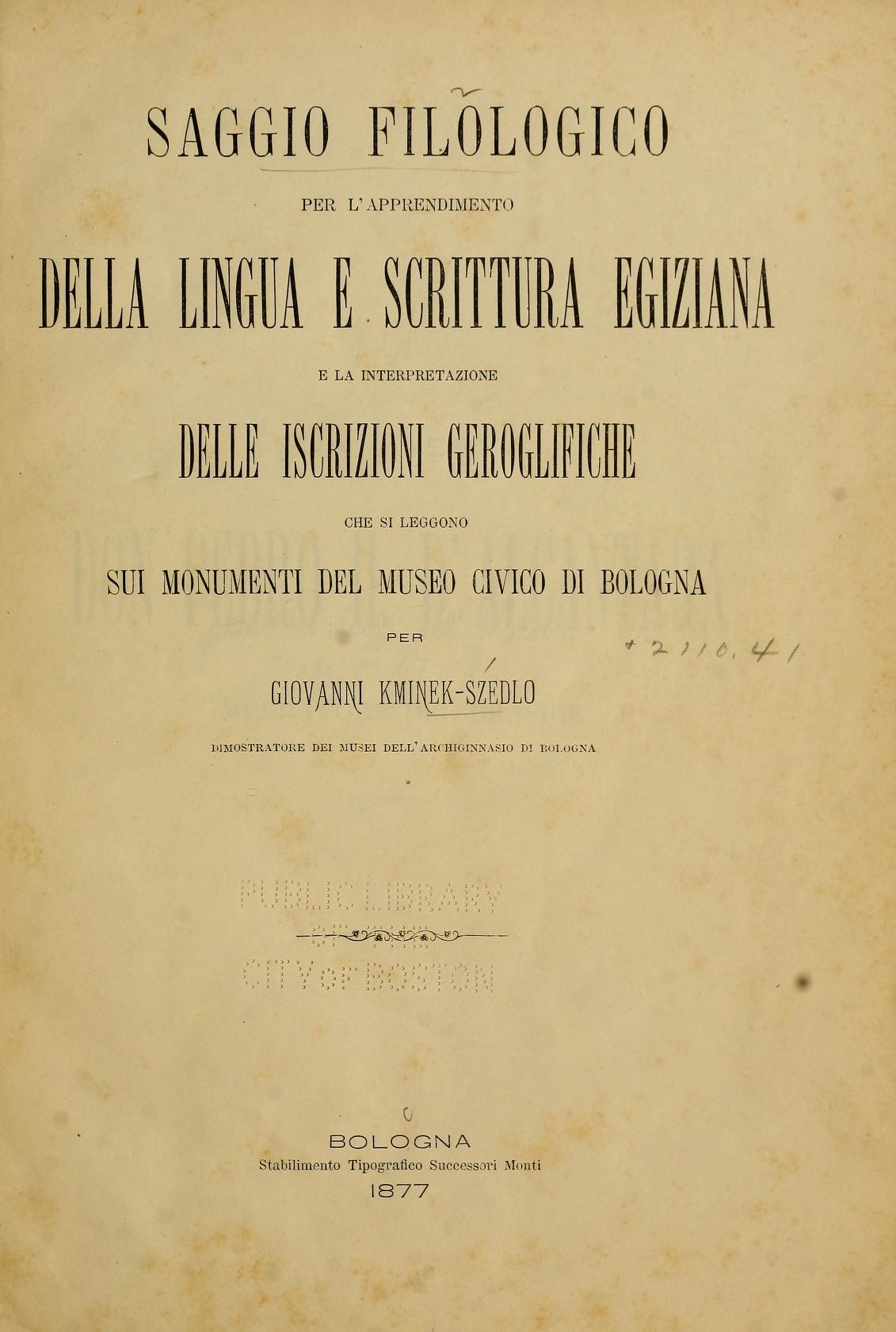
- First page of an 1877 work by Kminek-Szedlo
- Born: Jan Kmínek-Szedlo; April 22, 1828; Prague
- Died: November 24, 1896 (aged 68); Bologna
- Occupation: Egyptologist

Giovanni Kminek-Szedlo, née Jan Kmínek-Szedlo (April 22, 1828 – November 24, 1896) was a Czech–Italian Egyptologist.
He is usually remembered as the first Egyptologist from what nowadays is the Czech Republic but since he spent most of his life and fulfilled his whole career in Italy, he is usually not seen as the founder of Czech Egyptology, a figure rather identified in the later František Lexa.

== Biography ==
Born in Prague in 1828, he graduated from high school in 1846 in Plzeň and in the next two years he attended the Faculty of Arts of the Charles-Ferdinand University in Prague.
A sympathizer of the revolutionary events of 1848, in this year Kminek-Szedlo was forced to join the Austrian army and was later dispatched in Northern Italy.

After leaving the army he remained in Italy to continue his studies, Italianizing his given name in Giovanni. He got a job in the newly founded (1871) Archaeological Civic Museum of Bologna initially as a demonstrator, but later he managed to become the curator of the Egyptian collection. Since 1878 he was appointed lecturer in Egyptology at the University of Bologna, and around this period he extensively published works mainly regarding the Egyptian collection of Bologna. His best remembered work is a catalogue of the entire collection, published in 1895 and still in use nowadays; almost all of the artifacts has a code name KS (followed by a number) after the two initials of his last name.

Giovanni Kminek-Szedlo died in Bologna in November 24, 1896.

== Significant works ==
- Il grande sarcofago del Museo di Bologna, Bologna, 1876
- Saggio filologico per l'apprendimento della lingua e scrittura egiziana, e la interpretazione della inscrizioni geroglifiche che si leggono sui monumenti del Museo Civico di Bologna, Bologna, 1877 Available online
- Grammatica hieroglyphica, 1879
- L'Egitto moderno e l'Egitto dei Faraoni. Cenni di confronto, Bologna, 1880
- Museo Civico di Bologna. Catalogo di Antichità Egizie, Torino 1895 (reprint Wiesbaden 1981)
