= Ladislav Hejdánek =

Czech philosopher and professor (1927–2020)

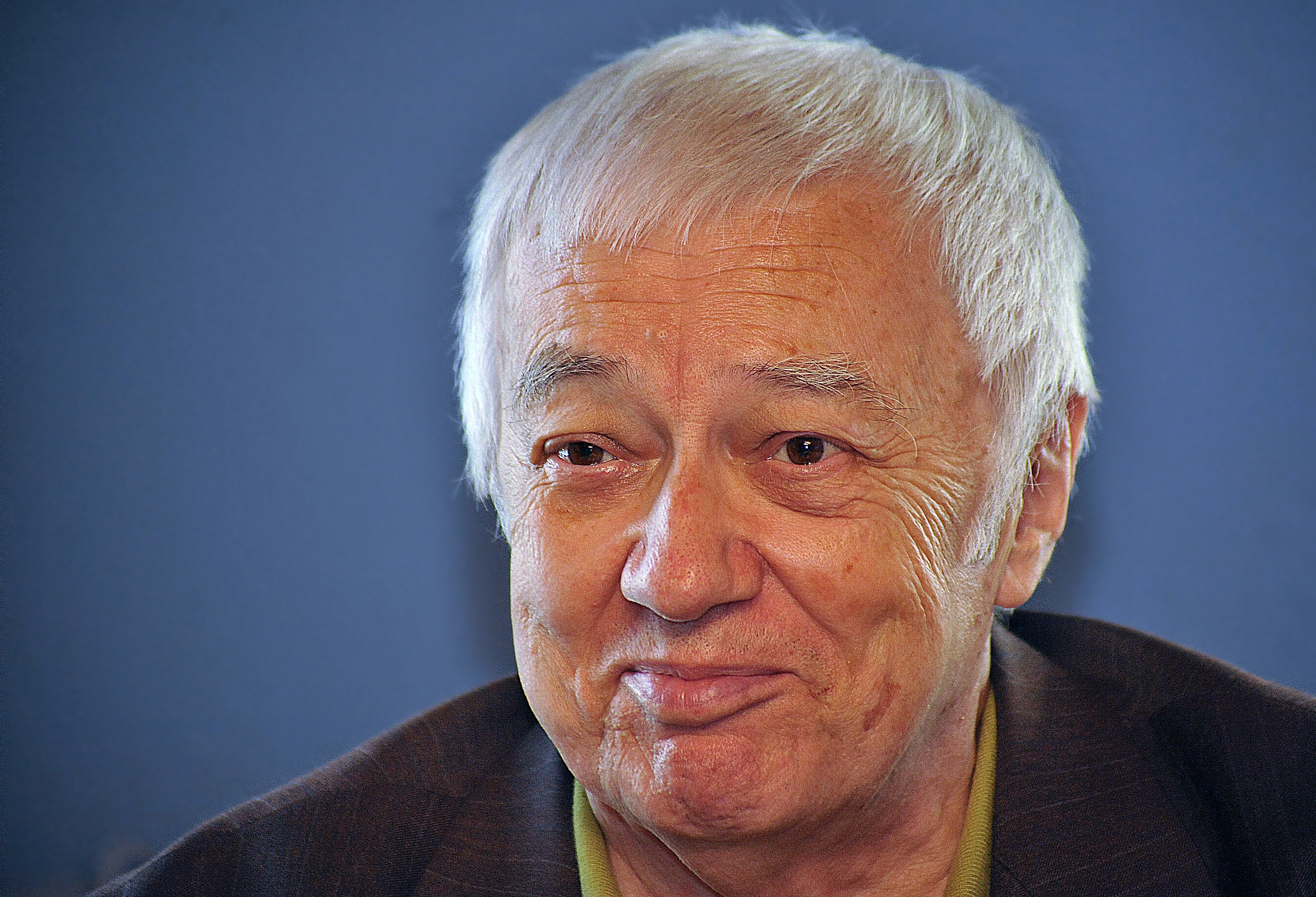
- Born: 10 May 1927; Prague, Czechoslovakia
- Died: 28 April 2020 (aged 92); Prague, Czech Republic

Ladislav Hejdánek (10 May 1927 – 28 April 2020) was a Czech philosopher and a proponent of Charter 77. He was born in Prague and graduated from the Charles University in Prague. In 1952 he attained a degree in philosophy with his dissertation "Truth and its ontological premises". From 1956 to 1968 he worked at the Prague Institute of Epidemiology and Microbiology. Then he took a position at the Institute for Philosophy of the Czechoslovak Academy of Sciences, but was expelled in 1971.

In 1985, Hejdánek established the journal Reflexe. Časopis pro filosofii a teologii. In 1990, he was habilitated at the Charles University in Prague, and two years later became a professor at that university. He later became chairman of the Unity of Philosophy and then Chairman of the Emanuel Rádl Foundation.

Hejdánek died on 28 April 2020 at the age of 92.
