= 4EU+ Alliance =

4EU+ European University Alliance
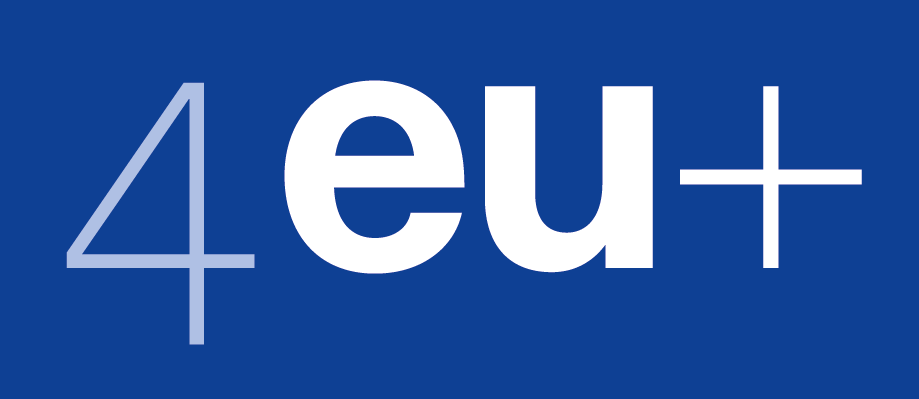
- Abbreviation: 4EU+
- Established: 2017 (7 years ago)
- Types: Education and research
- Headquarters: 4EU+ European University Alliance e.V., Fischmarkt 2, 69117 Heidelberg, Germany
- Area served: Europe
- Membership: Charles University; University of Heidelberg; Sorbonne University; University of Warsaw; University of Copenhagen; University of Milan; University of Geneva; Panthéon-Assas University
- Chairpersons: Isabelle Kratz
- Website: 4euplus.eu

The 4EU+ European University Alliance comprises 8 European universities: Charles University (Prague, Czech Republic), Heidelberg University (Germany), Sorbonne University (Paris, France), Panthéon-Assas University Paris (France), University of Copenhagen (Denmark), University of Milan (Italy), University of Warsaw (Poland) and University of Geneva (Switzerland).

== History ==
The alliance was launched in 2017 by Charles University, along with the University of Heidelberg, Sorbonne University and the University of Warsaw; the official founding act took place on March 10, 2018, with the signing of a joint declaration in Paris.

The University of Copenhagen and the University of Milan joined the alliance in October 2018. On February 28, 2019, Alliance 4EU + and 53 other university alliances submitted an application for funding under the “European Universities” call of the European Erasmus+ program. The funding application has been accepted.

The University of Geneva joined the alliance in August 2022.

== Missions ==
Alliance 4EU+ aims to develop cooperation in the fields of training and education, research and administration, as well as an infrastructure that brings together students, teachers, researchers and administrative staff.

Four multidisciplinary flagship programs have been adopted:

- Health and demographic change in the urban environment;
- “Europe in a changing world": understanding and involving societies, economies, cultures and languages;
- Transforming science and society through advances in information and communication technologies;
- Biodiversity and sustainable development.

== Members ==
Alliance members are prestigious public universities in six European countries, in four regions for which the European Union has adopted macro-regional strategies (Adriatic-Ionian region, Alpine region, Baltic Sea region, Danube region):

Institution	Country	City	Joined	Founded
Heidelberg University	Germany	Heidelberg	2018	1386
University of Copenhagen	Denmark	Copenhagen	2018	1479
Sorbonne University	France	Paris	2018	1257
Panthéon-Assas University	France	Paris	2023	1257
University of Warsaw	Poland	Warsaw	2018	1816
University of Milan	Italy	Milan	2018	1924
Charles University	Czech Republic	Prague	2018	1348
University of Geneva	Switzerland	Geneva	2022	1559

== See also ==
- Una Europa
- Europaeum
