= Václav Bělohradský =

Czech philosopher and sociologist (born 1944)

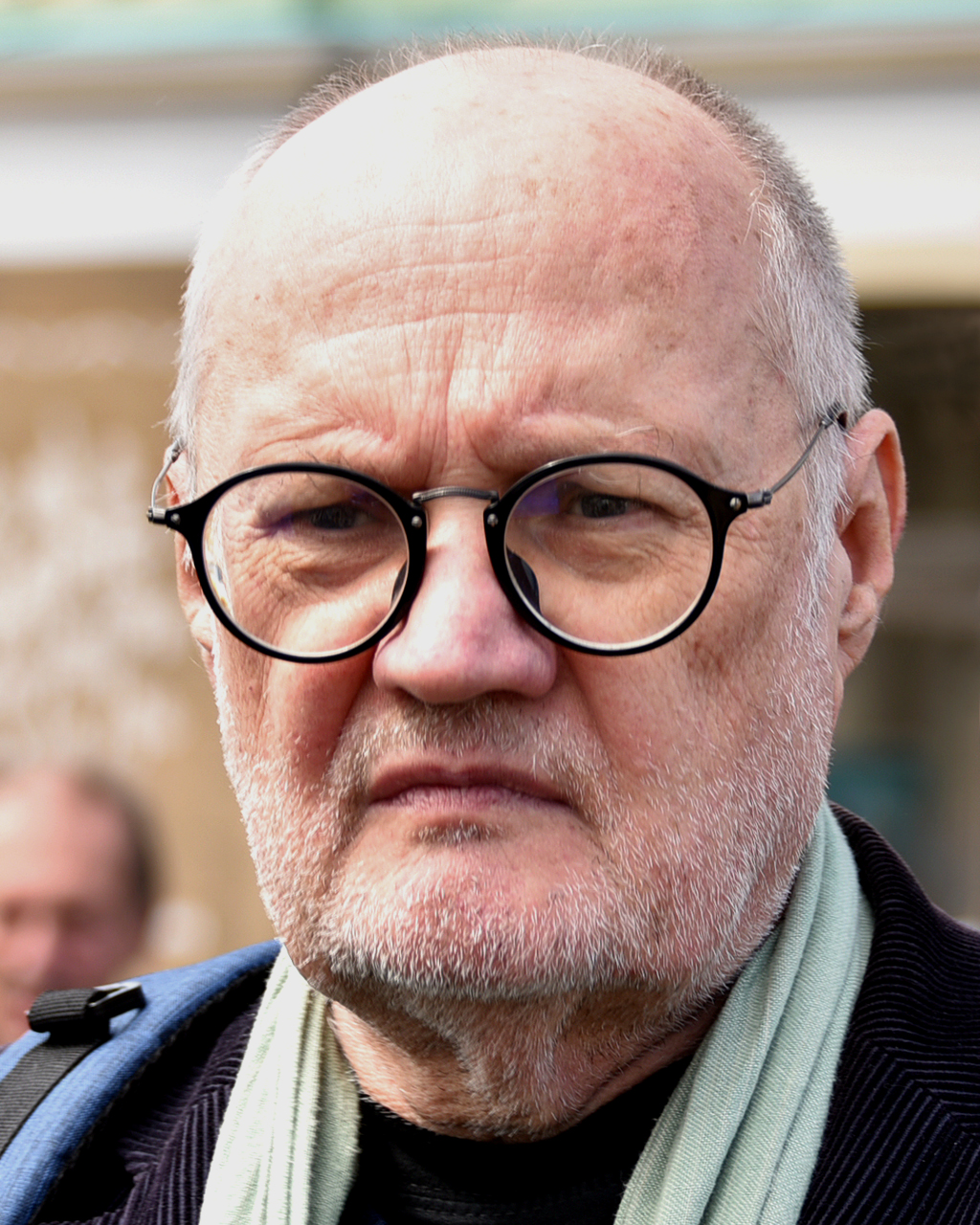
Václav Bělohradský (2019)

Václav Bělohradský (born January 17, 1944, Prague) is a Czech philosopher and sociologist.

== Life and career ==
Václav Bělohradský graduated in philosophy and Czech from Charles University, Prague, after which he lived in Italy, where he was Professor of Political Sociology at the University of Trieste. As a student of Jan Patočka, he influenced the thinking of Václav Havel. He is a representative of biocentrism, which he developed to refuse anthropocentric overestimation of symbol and culture. He also thinks we need to step back from "us" to be able to lay the foundations of a new and freer society. He co-participated with Chantal Mouffe and Slavoj Žižek at Monument to Transformation. He publishes his political commentaries and essays mainly in the Czech daily Právo.

== Works ==
- Interpretazioni italiane di Wittgenstein, Milan, 1972.
- Ragionamento, azione, società. Sociologia della conoscenza in Vilfredo Pareto, Milan, 1974.
- Il mondo della vita: un problema politico, Milan, 1981.
- Krize eschatologie neosobnosti, London, 1982, 1984.
- Myslet zeleň světa. Rozhovor s K. Hvížďalou, 1985, 1991.
- Kapitalismus a občanské ctnosti, 1992.
- Mezi světy & mezisvěty, 1997.
- Společnost nevolnosti, 2007.
- Mezi světy & mezisvěty: Reloaded, 2013
