= Jan Hajič =

Czech linguist

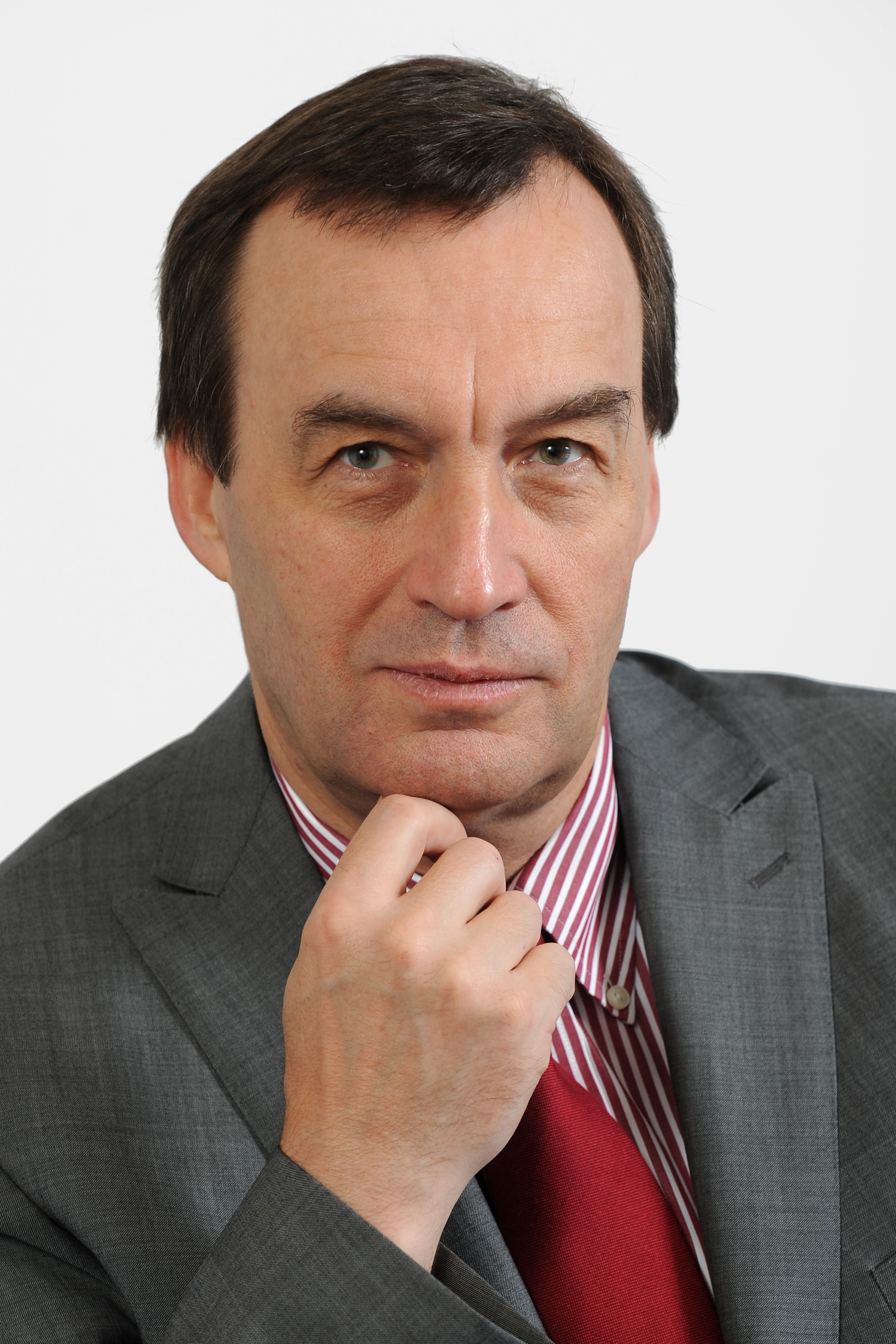
- Education: Charles University
- Scientific career
- Fields: Linguistics
- Workplaces: Faculty of Mathematics and Physics, Charles University

Jan Hajič (born November 4, 1960 in Prague) is a Czech computational linguist and the former director of the Institute of Formal and Applied Linguistics at the Charles University in Prague, from which he also holds a PhD degree. He specializes in empirical NLP, machine translation, speech recognition and creating of treebanks.
