= Anton Gindely =

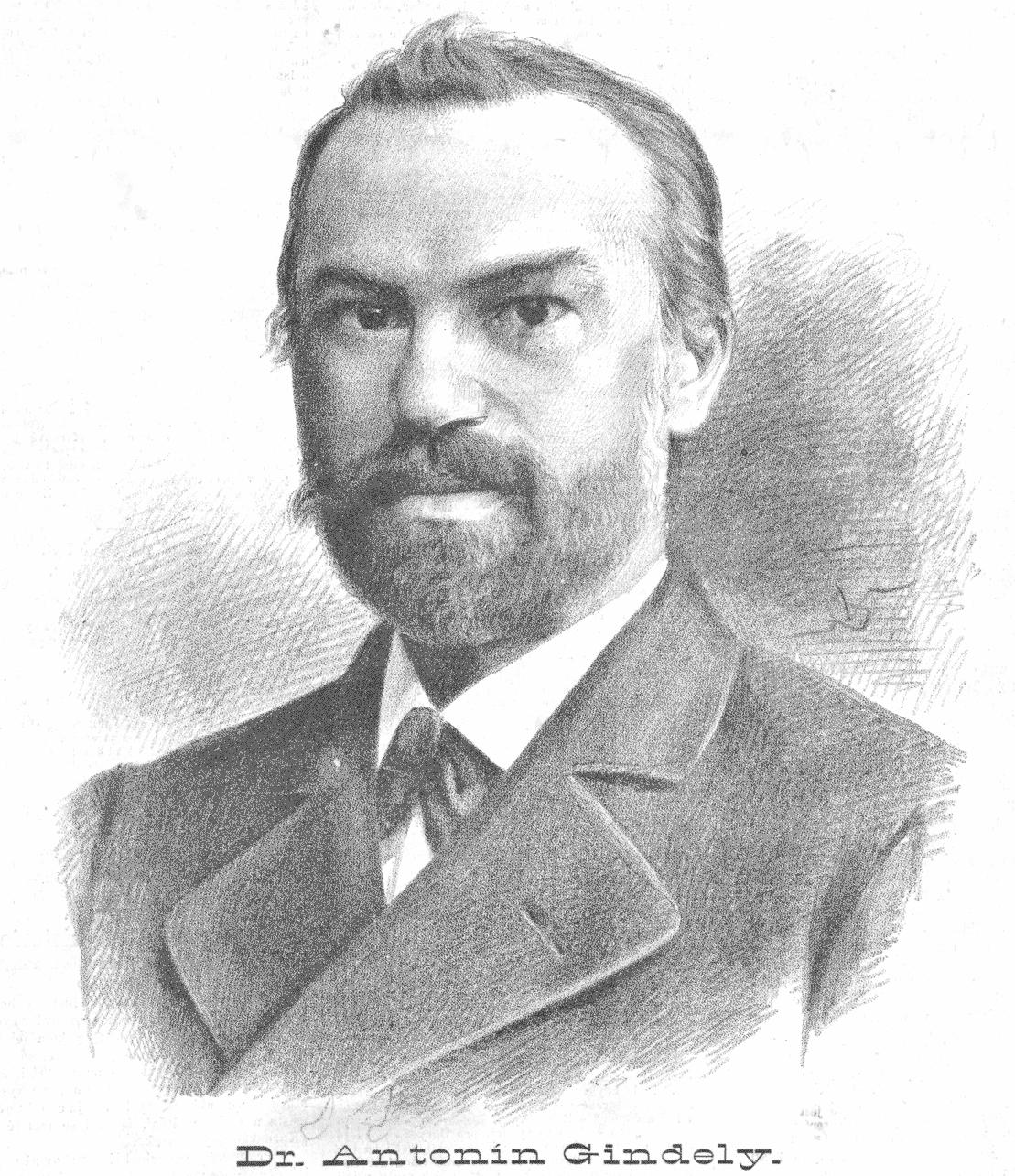
- Gindely in 1878
- Born: 3 September 1829; Prague, Bohemia, Austrian Empire
- Died: 24 October 1892 (aged 63)
- Occupation: historian

Anton Gindely (Czech: Antonín Gindely; 3 September 1829 – 24 October 1892) was a Czech historian.

== Biography ==
Gindely was born on 3 September 1829 in Prague, Bohemia, Austrian Empire.

He was the son of a Hungarian German father and a Czech mother. As a distinguished historian, Gindely has left number of valuable historical works, written in German and Bohemian.

The development of Gindely's perspective on Bohemian history reflected his different personal trajectories through the tumultuous events that happened during the first half of 19th century. He studied in Prague and in Olomouc, and, after travelling extensively in search of historical material, became professor of history at the German Charles-Ferdinand University of Prague and archivist for Bohemia in 1862. During the same time, Gindely was entrusted with the control of the library of Prince George Lobkowicz, which brought him in close connection with the literary interests of the leading families of the Bohemian nobility. He principally occupied himself during the final years of Bohemian independence. He died in Prague.

Gindely's chief work is his Geschichte des dreissigjährigen Krieges (Prague, 1869–1880), which has been translated into English (New York, 1884); and his historical work is mainly concerned with the period of the Thirty Years' War. 'Unity of the brethren' was one of his focused areas, which was evolved out of a more radical Hussite Movement. This was included a two volume "History of the Bohemian Brethren" (1857–58).

Perhaps the most important of his numerous other works are:

- Geschichte der böhmischen Brüder (Prague, 1857–1858)
- Rudolf II. und seine Zeit (1862–1868)
- A criticism of Wallenstein, Waldstein während seines ersten Generalats (1886)

He wrote a history of Gabriel Bethlen in Hungarian, and edited the Monumenta historiae Bohemica. Gindely's posthumous work, Geschichte der Gegenreformation in Böhmen, was edited by T. Tupetz (1894).
