= Reflexe =

Reflexe. Časopis pro filosofii a teologii
- Discipline: Philosophy, theology
- Language: Czech
- Edited by: Tomáš Koblížek

Publication details
- History: 1985–present
- Publisher: Oikoymenh (Czech Republic)
- Frequency: Biannually

Standard abbreviations
- ISO 4: Reflexe

Indexing
- ISSN: 0862-6901

Links
- Journal homepage

Reflexe is a Czech academic journal containing original research, systematic reviews, and translations relating to the fields of philosophy and theology. It has been established by Ladislav Hejdánek. During the period of 1985–89 the journal was printed and distributed in the samizdat form. Reflexe has been published officially since 1990. The journal appears two times a year with Tomáš Koblížek as editor-in-chief.

== See also ==
- List of philosophy journals
