= Jan Měšťák =

Jan Měšťák (born 26 August 1944) is a Czech medical doctor specializing in plastic surgery and university lecturer. He is head of the Department of Plastic Surgery at the First Faculty of Medicine of Charles University and University Hospital Bulovka in Prague and its founder.

He also acts as the head of the Department of Plastic Surgery at the Institute for Postgraduate Medical Education, head of the Center for Complex Surgical Treatment for Women with Breast Cancer at the University Hospital Bulovka and the Head Physician at the private clinic Esthé in Prague.

== Career ==
Měšťák is a graduate of the Faculty of Medicine at Charles University in Prague. He received his postgraduate specialization in general surgery and then worked at the Clinic of Plastic Surgery of the Third Faculty of Medicine of Charles University for more than 20 years, where, after postgraduate specialization, he was awarded a degree of associate professor. In his research activity, he has focused primarily on the issue of craniofacial clefts. As an author or co-author, he was involved in more than hundred of professional works. With his contribution, several monographs in the field of plastic surgery and aesthetic surgery arose and he participated in creation of educational texts for medical faculties and several research projects of the Ministry of Health of the Czech Republic. For many years, he has been working as the secretary of the Main Problem Committee of Plastic Surgery of the Ministry of Health of the CR, responsible for science and research.

== Membership ==
In addition to membership in the Society of Plastic Surgery and the Society of Aesthetic Surgery of JEP, he is also a member of international societies of plastic surgery IPRAS, ESPRAS and EBOPRAS.

== Profession positions ==
- Member of the Scientific Board of the Czech Medical Chamber
- Professional committee member of the Scientific Board of the Ministry of Health, CR
- Chairman of the Accreditation Commission for Plastic Surgery of the Ministry of Health, CR
- Member of the Examination Committee for the medical postgraduate certification in the field of plastic surgery at the Ministry of Health, CR
- Member of the Society of Plastic Surgery of JEP
- Deputy Chairman of the Society of Aesthetic Surgery of JEP

== Selected publications ==
- Estetická chirurgie a ostatní výkony estetické medicíny (Cosmetic surgery and other procedures of aesthetic medicine). Prague: Agentura Lucie. 2010 (et al.)
- Nos očima plastického chirurga (Nose in the Eyes of Plastic Surgeon). Prague: Grada. 2008
- Prsa očima plastického chirurga (Breasts in the Eyes of Plastic Surgeon). Prague: Grada. 2007
- Rekonstrukce prsu po mastektomii (Breast Reconstruction after Mastectomy).Prague: Grada. 2006 (co-author Luboš Dražan)
- Úvod do plastické chirurgie (Introduction to Plastic Surgery). Prague: Karolinum. 2005 (et al.)

== Awards ==
- Honorary Medal from the Czech Medical Society of JEP for long-term contribution in the field of plastic surgery
- Commemorative Medal for contributions to the development of plastic surgery in the Slovak Republic
- Certificate from the First Faculty of Medicine of Charles University for long-term educational activities on the campus
