= James Ramon Felak =

American historian (born 1957)

James Ramon Felak (born 1957) is an American historian who currently holds the Newman Center Term Professorship in Catholic Christianity at the University of Washington. He received his Ph.D. in European history from Indiana University in 1988. His research specializes in the history of Catholicism in Europe, as well as the intersection of religion and politics in the era of Pope John Paul II.

== Works ==
- Felak, James Ramon (1995). At the Price of the Republic: Hlinka's Slovak People's Party, 1929–1938. University of Pittsburgh Press. ISBN 978-0-8229-7694-3.
- Felak, James Ramon (2009). After Hitler, Before Stalin: Catholics, Communists, and Democrats in Slovakia, 1945–1948. University of Pittsburgh Press. ISBN 978-0-8229-7122-1.
- Felak, James Ramon (2020). The Pope in Poland: The Pilgrimages of John Paul II, 1979-1991. University of Pittsburgh Press. ISBN 978-0-8229-4598-7.
