= Matthew of Kraków =

German-Polish scholar and priest (c.1335–1410)

Matthew of Kraków (c. 1335 – 5 March 1410) was a German-Polish scholar and priest of the fourteenth century.

== Early life ==
He was born in Kraków, the son of a German immigrant town-clerk, but the view, once generally held, that he was descended from the Pomeranian noble family of Kraków, is now discredited (cf. Sommerfeld, Matthäus von Krakow, 1891). His father was probably a German notary in Kraków. Entering the University of Prague, Matthew graduated bachelor of arts in 1355 and master in 1357, and later filled for several terms the office of dean in the same faculty.

== Theologian and diplomat ==
A source from 1387 refers to Matthew as professor of theology, and one manuscript speaks of him as "city preacher of Prague". About 1382 he headed an embassy from his university to Urban VI, before whom he delivered a dissertation in favour of reform. Accepting an invitation from the University of Heidelberg, he joined its professorial staff in 1395, and a year later was appointed rector. In 1395 he was named councillor to Rupert II, and the raising of Rupert III, Elector Palatine to the dignity of King of the Romans in 1400 marks the beginning of Matthew's career as a statesman.

Frequently employed by the king both at court and on embassies, he appeared at Rome in 1403 to solicit Boniface IX's confirmation of Rupert's claims. On the elevation of Innocent VII to the papal throne in 1404, Matthew greeted him on behalf of Rupert. During the same year Matthew was appointed Bishop of Worms, and settled a dispute between the people and clergy of that city.

Gregory XII wished to name him Cardinal Priest of St. Cyriac in Thermis, but Matthew declined the honour. As ambassador of Rupert to the Council of Pisa, he displayed the greatest zeal on behalf of Gregory XII, whom he regarded as the legitimate occupant of the papal throne. He died at Pisa.

== Works ==
Matthew was a very prolific theological writer. Apart from Biblical commentaries, sermons, and works on current topics, the most important of his writings are:

- De consolatione theologiae
- De modo confitendi
- De puritate conscientiae
- De corpore Christi
- De celebratione Missae

That he wrote De arte moriendi – to be distinguished from a similar work by Cardinal Capran – cannot be maintained with certainty.

The work De praxi curiae Romanae or De squaloribus curiae Romanae from around 1405 is attributed to him, though this has been disputed.
