= Lešetice =

- Municipality
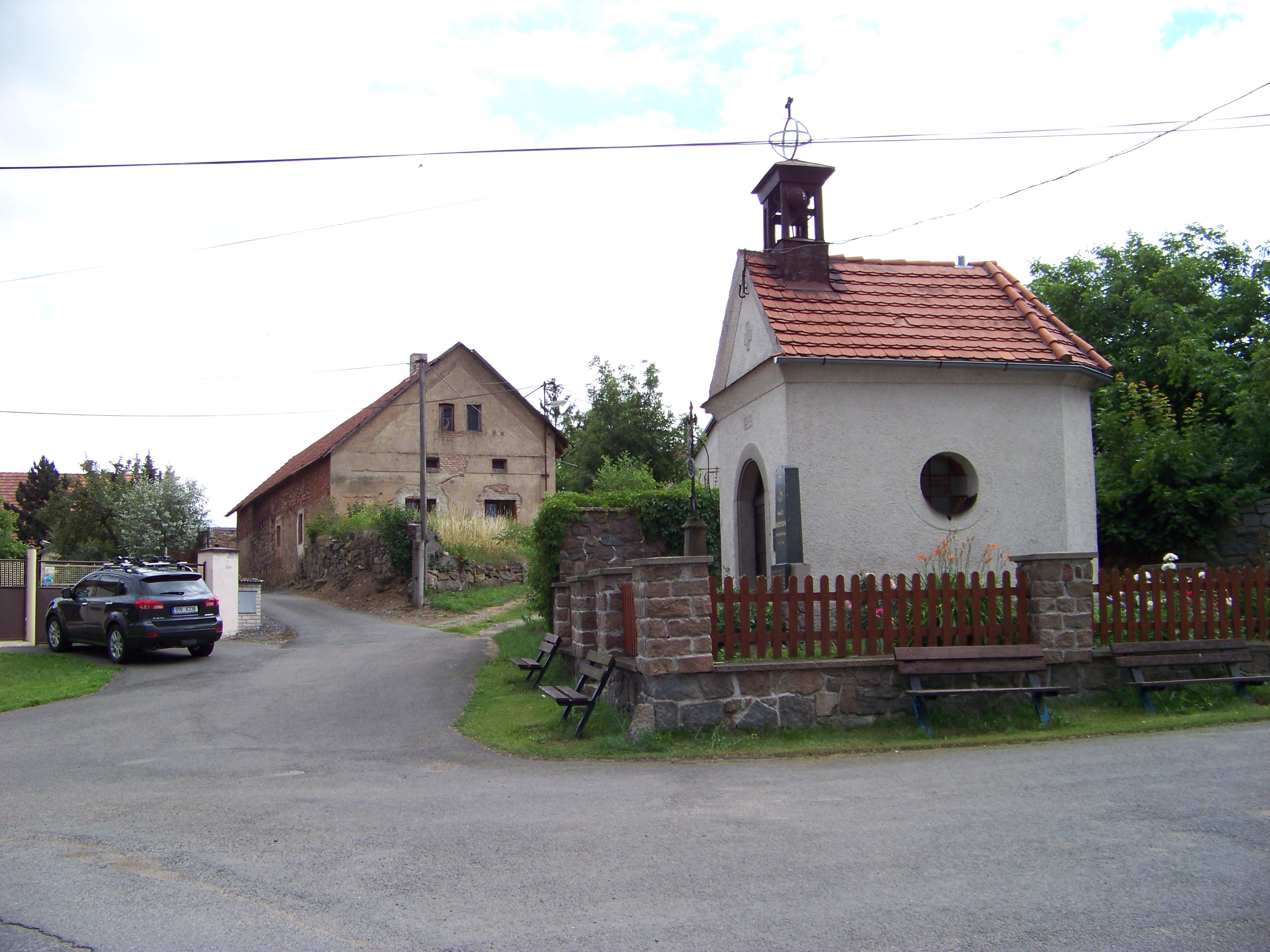
- Chapel of the Sacred Heart

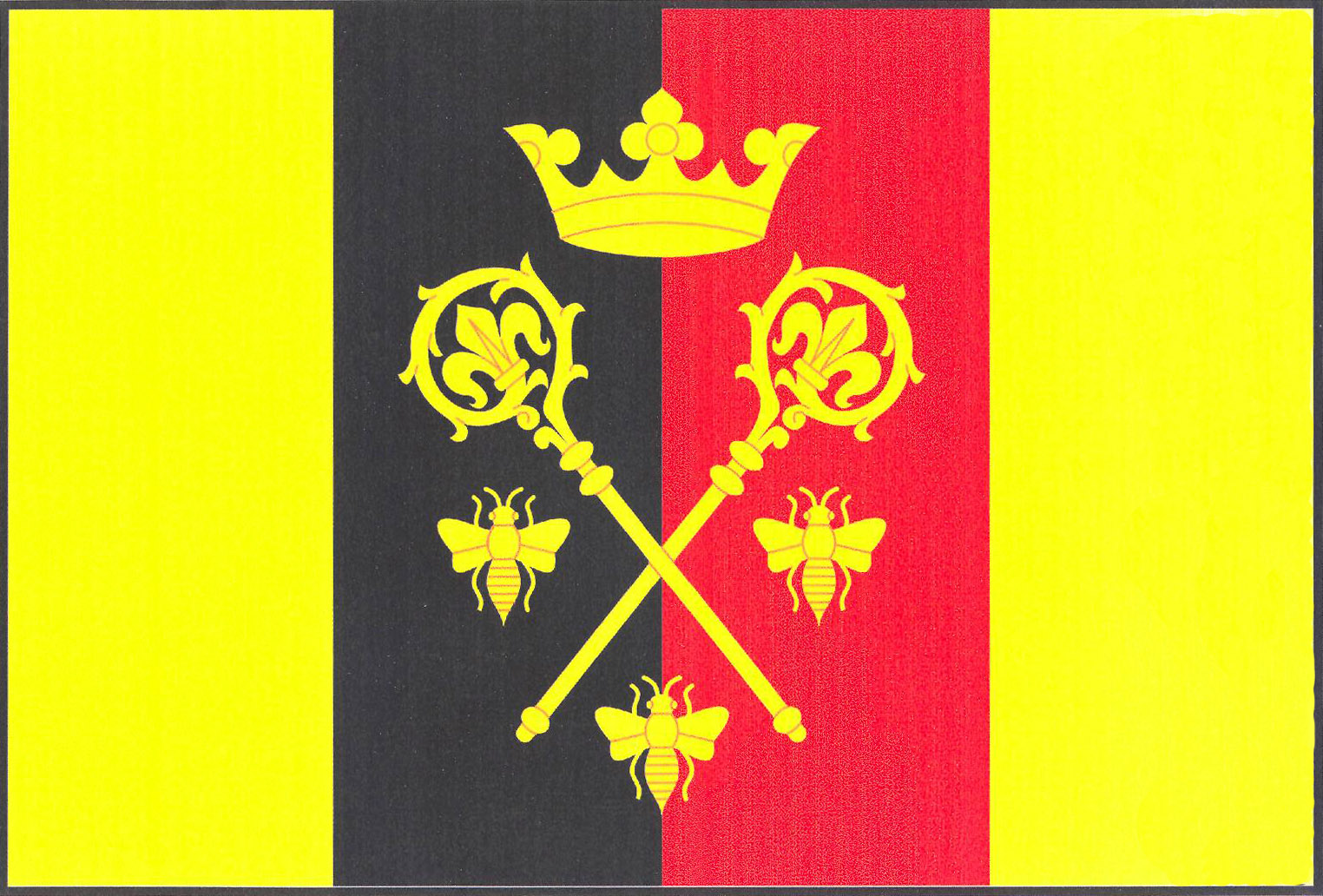
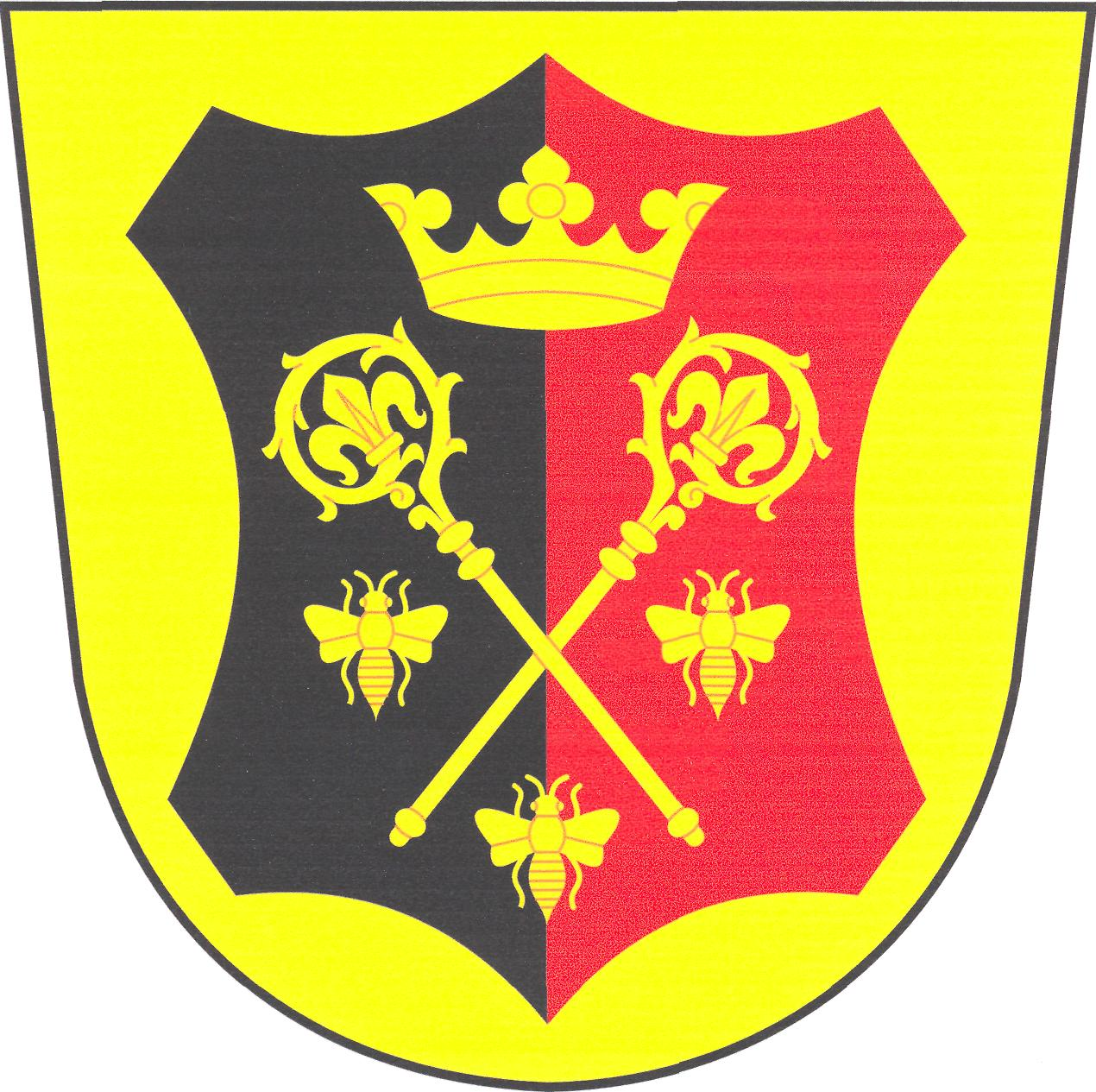
- Flag Coat of arms

- Location in the Czech Republic
- Coordinates: 49°38′50″N 14°1′16″E
- Country: Czech Republic
- Region: Central Bohemian
- District: Příbram
- First mentioned: 1349

Area
  - Total: 3.06 km^{2} (1.18 sq mi)
- Elevation: 540 m (1,770 ft)

Population (2026-01-01)
  - Total: 231
  - Density: 75.5/km^{2} (196/sq mi)
- Time zone: UTC+1 (CET)
  - Summer (DST): UTC+2 (CEST)
- Postal code: 262 31
- Website: www.lesetice.cz

Lešetice is a municipality and village in Příbram District in the Central Bohemian Region of the Czech Republic. It has about 200 inhabitants.

== Demographics ==
Historical population
| Year | Pop. | ±% |
|---|---|---|
| 1869 | 250 | — |
| 1880 | 226 | −9.6% |
| 1890 | 266 | +17.7% |
| 1900 | 296 | +11.3% |
| 1910 | 294 | −0.7% |
| 1921 | 260 | −11.6% |
| 1930 | 215 | −17.3% |
| 1950 | 172 | −20.0% |
| 1961 | 149 | −13.4% |
| 1970 | 156 | +4.7% |
| 1980 | 134 | −14.1% |
| 1991 | 95 | −29.1% |
| 2001 | 84 | −11.6% |
| 2011 | 114 | +35.7% |
| 2021 | 210 | +84.2% |
Source: Censuses
