= Holas =

Holas (Czech feminine: Holasová) is a surname. Notable people with the surname include:

- Aneta Holasová (born 2001), Czech gymnast
- Emil Holas (1917–1985), Czech psychology educator and writer
