= Maria Theresa Armoury =

Coordinates: 49°35′44″N 17°15′36″E

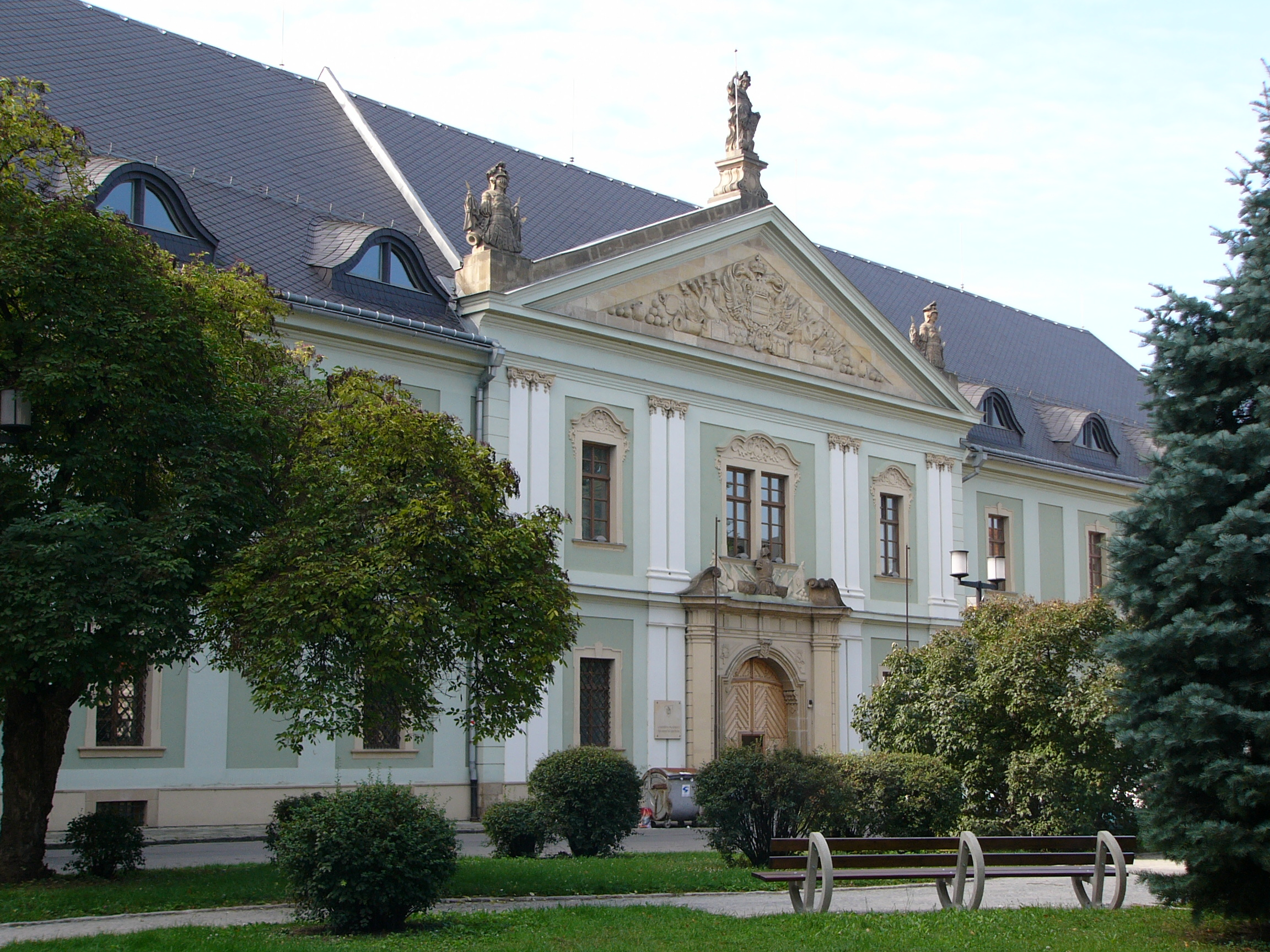
Information centre of Palacký University; formerly an armoury

The Maria Theresa Armoury (Czech: Tereziánská zbrojnice) is a former artillery arsenal in Olomouc in today's Czech Republic. It was built in 1768–1769 as part of the Olomouc Fortress and named after Maria Theresa. Since 1999, the building has been used as the headquarters of the library of the Palacký University Olomouc.

== History ==
The Maria Theresa Armoury was built between 1768 and 1769 as an artillery arsenal of the Olomouc Fortress, on the site where the Collegium Nobilium stood. Olomouc had become an important fortified city after the loss of much of Silesia to Austria, and was significantly fortified under Maria Theresa. According to legend, Empress Maria Theresa had the arsenal built on Biskupské Square half in front of the Archbishop's Palace because she had a quarrel with the then Bishop of Olomouc and wanted to prevent him from being able to enter his palace by carriage. Between 1771 and 1778, the arsenal was further expanded.

== Present use ==
In 1991, the building came into the hands of Palacký University Olomouc (UP) which decided to convert it into a library and information centre. In 1997, the building was occupied by the library.

In 1999, the reconstruction was completed and the library was opened. The motto of the university library is "Ze zbrojnic udělejte biblioték" ("Turn arsenals into libraries"), a statement by Moravian educator John Amos Comenius in his work Clamores Eliae (Křiky Eliášovy). Today (in addition to the university library), a restaurant, the university computer technology center, the UP Publishing House, the UP Archive and the Eurocentrum are located here.

== Description ==
The Maria Theresa Armoury is a one-story Neoclassical building with an attic and has four wings around a courtyard. The late Baroque decorative elements are typical of Austrian military architecture of this era. On the gable above the building's main entrance is a statue of the Roman god Mars in armor. It is located on the south side Biskupské Square and is further enclosed by Akademická, Křížkovského and Wurmova streets. Next to the arsenal on Biskupské Square is the Archbishop's Palace of the Archbishops of Olomouc.
