= Tadeáš Polanský =

Czech scientist

Tadeáš Polanský Thaddäus Polansky
- Born: 1713; Uherské Hradiště
- Died: 1770 (aged 56–57)
- Scientific career
- Fields: physics, theology
- Workplaces: University of Olomouc

Tadeáš Polanský, Latin: Thaddaeus Polansky, German: Thaddäus Polansky (1713 – 1770) was a Jesuit theologian and scientist in the field of physics.

== Life ==
Tadeáš Polanský was since 1734 lecturing at a Gymnasium (school) in Uherské Hradiště. Later he became professor of dogmatics at University of Olomouc. Apart from theology, he was, together with Polanský Jan Nepomuk (1723 – 1776), active in the field of physics, researching lightning and thunder, colors, phases of Venus, primary and secondary rainbow, and other. In years 1760 – 1761, Polanský became dean of the University's Faculty of Theology.

He was lecturing in Olomouc at the time when Joseph II, Holy Roman Emperor stepped up his fight for absolute power, effectively restricting the Jesuit monopoly in education. At the University of Olomouc, the struggle was taking place particularly between the conservative Jesuits and a proponent of enlightenment ideas Josef Vratislav Monse.

Polanský's book Manudictio sacerdotis ad com-modissime subeundum examen pro approbatione et jurisdictione, printed in 1762, was banned in 1769. Later, in February 1771, a directive explicitly ordered Ausrottung (extermination) of the book, while another one from May 1771 introduced heavy fines for mere possession of the book.

== Main works ==
- (in Latin) Dissertatio Physico-Experimentalis Juxta Principia Aristotelis, et scholae peripateticae De tonitruo, fulgore, Seu Coruscatione, ac Fulmine, Contra Sensa, & Opiniones Antiperipateticorum, Luci publicae proposita ..., Olomouc 1747
- (in Latin) Experimenta Animae Sensiteriö Gustûs Sapores examinantis Juxta Veriora, & saniora Peripateticorum Dogmata Physiologicè siscussa, Olomouc 1748
- (in Latin) Tractatus Theologicus De Admirabili Filii Dei Incarnatione, Olomouc 1751
- (in Latin) Tractatus Theologico-Speculativo-Dogmaticus In Primam Secundae Doctoris Angelici Divi Thomae Aquinatis Praecipuè à quaestione 51. De Virtutibus, Vitiis, Peccatis, Gratia, Justificatione, Et Merito, Usui Auditorum Accommodatus, Olomouc 1752
- (in Latin) Tractatus Theologico-Dogmatico-Scholasticus In Primam Secundae Doctoris Angelici Divi Thomae Aquinatis De Actibus Humanis Et Beatitudine. Itèm In Primam Partem Ejusdem Doctoris Angelici à quaestione 50. usque ad quaestionem 64. inclusivè, & à quaestione 106. usque ad 107. pariter inclusivè, De Excellenti Angelorum Natura Usui Auditorum accommodatus, Olomouc 1753
- (in Latin) Tractatus Theologico-Dogmaticus De Sacramentis Novae Legis Cumprimis De Baptismo, Confirmatione, Evcharistia Ex Tertia Parte Summae D. Thomae Aquinatis à Quaestione 60. usque ad 84. exclusivè, & in quartum Sententiarum à Distinctione I. usque ad Distinctionem 13. inclusivè Aptatus Practico Studio Auditorum Sacrae Theologiae In Alma, Caesarea, et Regia Universitate Olomucensi Societatis Jesu Pro Anno 1753. vergente in 1754. Cum Licentia Ordinarii, Olomouc 1754
- (in Latin) Assertiones Ex Universa Theologia Quas In Alma Caesarea, Regia, Ac Episcopali Universitate Olomucensi Societatis Jesu E Praelectionibus Reverendi, Olomouc 1756
- (in Latin) Tractatus de Verbi Divini Incarnatione, Olomouc 1757
- (in Latin) Tractatus De Sacramentis In Communi, Et De Baptismo, Confirmatione, Et Eucharistia, Olomouc 1758
- (in Latin) Tractatus de poenitentia Anno a reparata salute 1759, Olomouc 1759
- (in Latin) Manuductio Sacerdotis Ad Commodius Subeundum Examen Pro Approbatione, Et Jurisdictione, Olomouc 1762
