= Collegium Nobilium (Olomouc) =

Location of Olomouc in The Czech Republic
- Location within Czech Republic
- Coordinates: 49°35′42″N 17°15′32″E

Following the Thirty Years' War, the education in Moravia was firmly in the hands of Jesuits. Moravian nobility were keen to expand the range of areas taught at the University of Olomouc beyond just theology and philosophy. Despite opposition from the Jesuits, the Emperor Leopold I authorized the introduction of secular legal studies in 1679. However, the quarrels with the Jesuits became so intense that soon the law Professors had to leave the University and continued their lectures first in private premises, later in the building of Olomouc court. They were paid by the Moravian nobility, and since 1709 the Professors were appointed directly by the Emperors. While in the next decade the Jesuits accepted the Professorate within the University, the Nobility was seeking to enlarge the education opportunities.

In 1725 the Moravian nobility forced the establishment of the Collegium Nobilium — the Academy of Nobility — by the decree of Emperor Charles VI in Olomouc. The lectures were provided by Professor of Law (since 1732 there were two of them, since 1735 three), who was teaching also at the University, Professor of Engineering (who taught both civil and military engineering and architecture, mathematics, geometry and cartography), lecturer of languages (initially French, since 1815 also Italian, since 1829 also Czech), and teachers of dance, gymnastics, swordsmanship and equitation.

In 1778 both the University and the Academy were relocated to Brno, however by 1782 both of them were back in Olomouc. In 1783 Emperor Joseph II merged it with the Theresian Academy in Vienna, which was however closed in 1784. The Olomouc Academy itself was closed in 1787. However, only four years later Emperor Leopold II decided to restore the Academy in Olomouc, and it was reopened in 1793.

In 1810 the Department of Agriculture was established, and since 1815 there was also Professor of Natural Science. There were efforts to introduce also lectures of geometry, mechanics and practical chemistry, however they succeeded only after the establishment of the Brno Technical College.

The Academy remained in Olomouc until 1847, when it was relocated to Brno: here it became the basis for what was later to become the Brno University of Technology.
