= Johann Schmidt (historian) =

Moravian historian

- Born: 1693
- Died: 1762 (aged 68–69)

Johann Schmidt (1693–1762) was a Moravian historian who worked for the Palacký University in Olomouc. He was a Jesuit.
