= Regional Centre of Advanced Technologies and Materials =

Czech research center

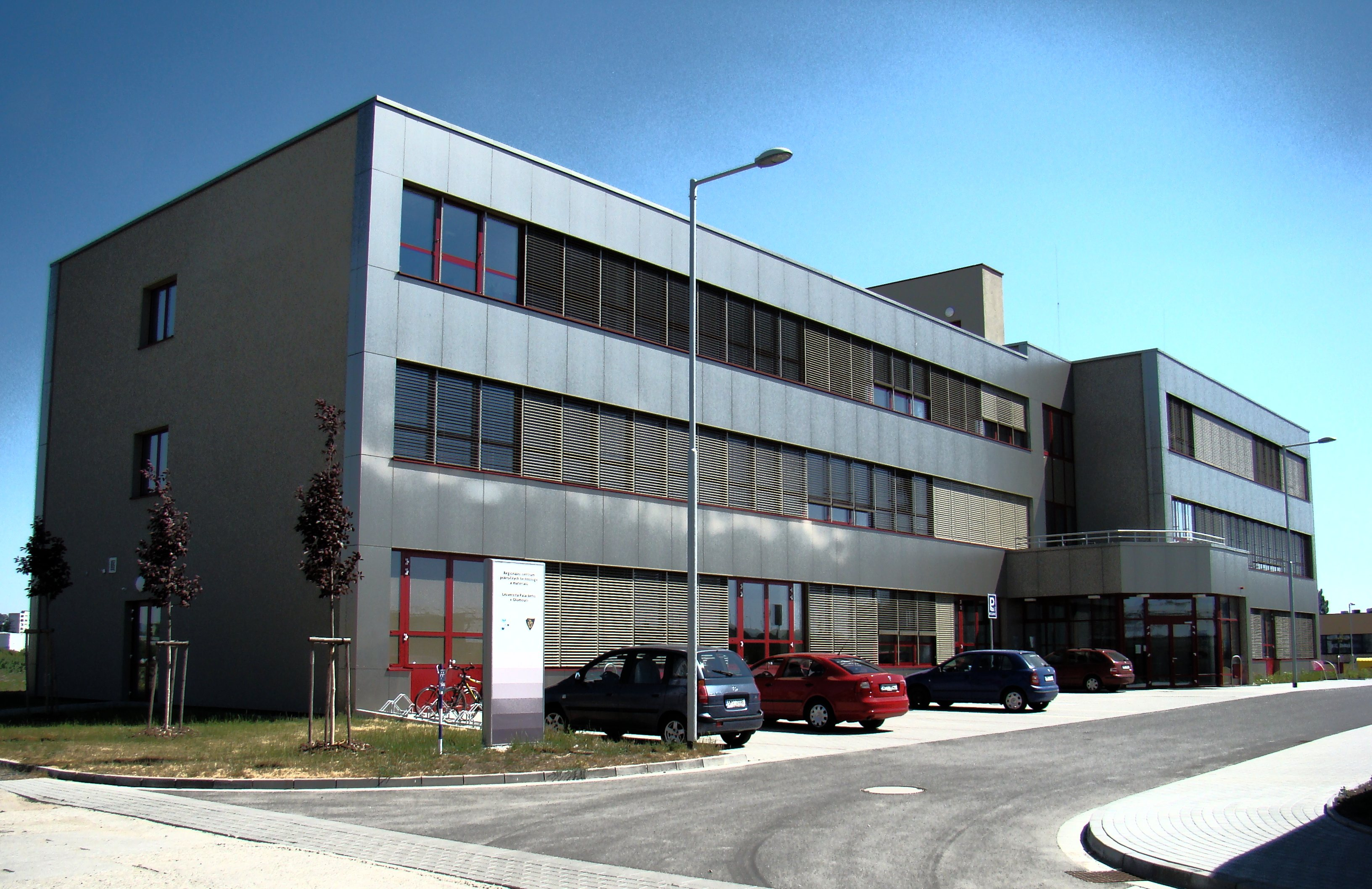
- Main building
- Director: Prof. Michal Otyepka, Ph.D.
- Address: Šlechtitelů 241/27, 779 00; Olomouc, Czech Republic
- Coordinates: 49.5760°N 17.2794°E
- Interactive map of Regional Centre of Advanced Technologies and Materials
- Website: rcptm.com/

The Regional Centre of Advanced Technologies and Materials (Czech: Regionální centrum pokročilých technologií a materiálů, RCPTM) is a scientific and research centre connected to the Faculty of Science, Palacký University, Olomouc. Its chief objective is to produce superlative research and to transfer high-tech products and technologies to medical, industrial and environmental practice with a pronounced emphasis on connecting the Centre to international networks and collaborations. The center was established on 1 October 2010, and since October 2013 is housed in a high-tech new building in Palacky University campus at Šlechtitelů street.

The center is mainly engaged in chemical, material and optical research. Priority areas of research include nanoparticles of metal oxides for catalytic, magnetic and biomedical applications, carbon nanostructures based on graphene and quantum dots, metal nanoparticles for antimicrobial treatment and technology of water purification, medical, computer and coordination chemistry, photonics and development of instrumental techniques for applications in optics and analytical chemistry.

The center is linked with research institutes Palacky University, supports the creation of new companies focused on sophisticated technology.

In 2016 formed the basis for personnel approximately 100 member research team consisting of more than 20 percent of foreign experts. General Director of the Centre is Prof. RNDr. Radek Zboril, Ph.D.

== Center research divisions ==
The structure of the eight research divisions is in accordance with the seven research programmes of the Centre.

- Magnetic nanostructures
- Carbon Nanostructures, Biomolecules and Simulations
- Biologically Active Complexes and Molecular Magnets
- Optical and Photonic Technologies
- Nanomaterials in biomedicine
- Nanotechnology in Analytical Chemistry
- Environmental Nanotechnologies
- Photoelectrochemistry

== Grant activities ==
From 2010-2013, the staff of the centre succeeded in a total of 55 submitted projects, whose grants amounted to over CZK 520 mil.

These grants include:

- ERC-Consolidator grant: Two-Dimensional Chemistry towards New Graphene Derivatives
- Nanobiowat, Alterbio- (Centra kompetence, Technologická agentura České republiky)
- NanoRem, EcoThermo - (7. EU Framework Programme)

The center is also involved in prestigious international collaborations type Pierre Auger Observatory, Cherenkov Telescope Array, or CERN-ATLAS.

== Scientific results ==
Important Publications:

- J. Šponer, G. Bussi, M. Krepl, P. Banáš, S. Bottaro, R. A. Cunha, A. Gil-Ley, G. Pinamonti, S. Poblete, P. Jurečka, N. G. Walter, M. Otyepka: „RNA Structural Dynamics As Captured by Molecular Simulations: A Comprehensive Overview", Chem. Rev. 118, 4177-4338 (2018).
- J. Tuček, P. Błoński, J. Ugolotti, A. K. Swain, T. Enoki, R. Zbořil: „Emerging chemical strategies for imprinting magnetism in graphene and related 2D materials for spintronic and biomedical applications", Chem. Soc. Rev. 47, 3899-3990 (2018).
- A. Panáček, L. Kvítek, M. Smékalová, R. Večeřová, M. Kolář, M. Röderová, F. Dyčka, M. Šebela, R. Prucek, O. Tomanec, R. Zbořil: „Bacterial resistance to silver nanoparticles and how to overcome it", Nat. Nanotechnol. 13, 65–71 (2018).
- J. Kou, C. Lu, J. Wang, Y. Chen, Z. Xu, R. S. Varma: „Selectivity Enhancement in Heterogeneous Photocatalytic Transformations", Chem. Rev. 117, 1445-1514 (2017).
- S. Kment, F. Riboni, S. Pausova, L. Wang, L. Wang, H. Han, Z. Hubička, J. Krysa, P. Schmuki, R. Zbořil: „Photoanodes based on TiO2 and α-Fe2O3 for solar water splitting – superior role of 1D nanoarchitectures and of combined heterostructures ", Chem. Soc. Rev. 46, 3716–3769 (2017).
- K. Ulbrich, K. Holá, V. Šubr, A. Bakandritsos, J. Tuček, R. Zbořil: „Targeted Drug Delivery with Polymers and Magnetic Nanoparticles: Covalent and Noncovalent Approaches, Release Control, and Clinical Studies", Chem. Rev. 116, 5338-5431 (2016).
- V. Georgakilas, J. A. Perman, J. Tuček, R. Zbořil: „Broad Family of Carbon Nanoallotropes: Classification, Chemistry, and Applications of Fullerenes, Carbon Dots, Nanotubes, Graphene, Nanodiamonds, and Combined Superstructures", Chem. Rev. 115, 4744–4822 (2015).
- M. B. Gawande, S. N. Shelke, R. Zbořil, R. S. Varma: „Microwave-Assisted Chemistry: Synthetic Applications for Rapid Assembly of Nanomaterials and Organics", Acc. Chem. Res. 47, 1338-1348 (2014).
- K.E. Riley, P. Hobza: „On the Importance and Origin of Aromatic Interactions in Chemistry and Biodisciplines“, Acc. Chem. Res. 46, 927-936 (2013).
- P. Lazar, S. Zhang, K. Šafářová, Q. Li, J.P. Froning, J. Granatier, P. Hobza, R. Zbořil, F. Besenbacher, M. Dong, M. Otyepka: „Quantification of the Interaction Forces between Metals and Graphene by Quantum Chemical Calculations and Dynamic Force Measurements under Ambient Conditions “, ACS Nano 7, 1646-1651 (2013).
- V. Georgakilas, M. Otyepka, A.B. Bourlinos, V. Chandra, N. Kim, K.C. Kemp, P. Hobza, R. Zbořil, K.S. Kim: „Functionalization of Graphene: Covalent and Non-Covalent Approaches, Derivatives and Applications“, Chem. Rev. 112, 6156-6214 (2012).
- P. Hobza: „Calculations on Noncovalent Interactions and Databases of Benchmark Interaction energies“, Acc. Chem. Res. 45, 663–672 (2012).

Patents

- Method of immobilization of silver nanoparticles on solid substrates. Inventors: R. Zbořil, J. Soukupová: (US 9505027 B2, 11/2016, EP 2701515 B1, 09/2017)
- Dichlorido complexes of platinum with 7-azaindole halogeno-derivatives for use in the treatment of tumour diseases. Inventors: Trávníček, Z.; Štarha, P.; Dvořák, Z. (EP2636410 B1, 04/2015)
- The method of synthesis of the iron nanopowder with the protective oxidic coat from natural and synthetic nanopowdered iron oxides and oxyhydroxides. Inventors: R. Zbořil, O. Schneeweiss, J. Filip, M. Mašláň: (EP2164656 B1, 07/2013)
- Process of whey protein separation from milk medium and apparatus for its implementation. Inventors: K. Holá, R. Zbořil, I. Medřík (EP 2873329, 5/2017)
- Composite planar cellulose-based material. Inventors: L. Lapčík, B. Lapčíková, R. Zbořil (EP 3034693 B1 08/2018)
- Antibiotic formulation and use thereof. Inventors: A. Panáček, L. Kvítek, R. Prucek, M. Kolář, R. Zbořil (application 2013-62, EP2950804 B1, 12/2017, WO2014117755)
- Utilization of copper complexes involving 2-phenyl-3-hydroxy-4(1H)-quinolinone and 1,10-phenanthroline derivatives for the preparation of drugs for the treatment of tumour diseases. Inventors: Z. Trávníček, J. Vančo, R. Buchtík, Z. Dvořák (EP 2650000 B1)
- Dichlorido complexes of platinum with 7-azaindole halogeno-derivatives for use in the treatment of tumour diseases. Inventors: Z. Trávníček, P. Štarha, Z. Dvořák: (EP 2636410 B1)
- A method of measuring rapid changes of low values of surface conductivity of dielectrics in the environment of electromagnetic interference of mains voltage and a device for performing this method of measuring. Inventor: P. Fryčák: (CZ 306726 B6, 04/2017)
- Gold complexes with ω-substituted derivatives of 6-alkyloxy-9-deazapurines and phosphane derivatives and use of these complexes for the preparation of drugs for the therapy of inflammatory and tumour diseases. Inventors: Trávníček, Z.; Gáliková, J.; Hošek, J.; Vančo, J. (CZ 305624 B6 12/2015)
