= Emil Holas =

Emil Holas (1917 - 1985) was a Psychology educator and writer from Czechoslovakia. Holas studied Latin, French, and Philosophy at Charles University in Prague, Czech Republic. Between 1952 and 1960 Holas led the Department of Psychology at Palacký University in Olomouc, Czechoslovakia. In 1960 he also held the post of the dean of the Faculty of Philosophy of Palacký University. The Library of Congress records 3 books written or edited by Holas.

== Publications ==
- Some problems of aggression, motivation, concept learning (1970)
- Behavior, Subject and Psychology (1971)
- Chapters from General Psychology: Thinking (1971)
