= Palacký University Olomouc =

Czech university

- Univerzita Palackého v Olomouci
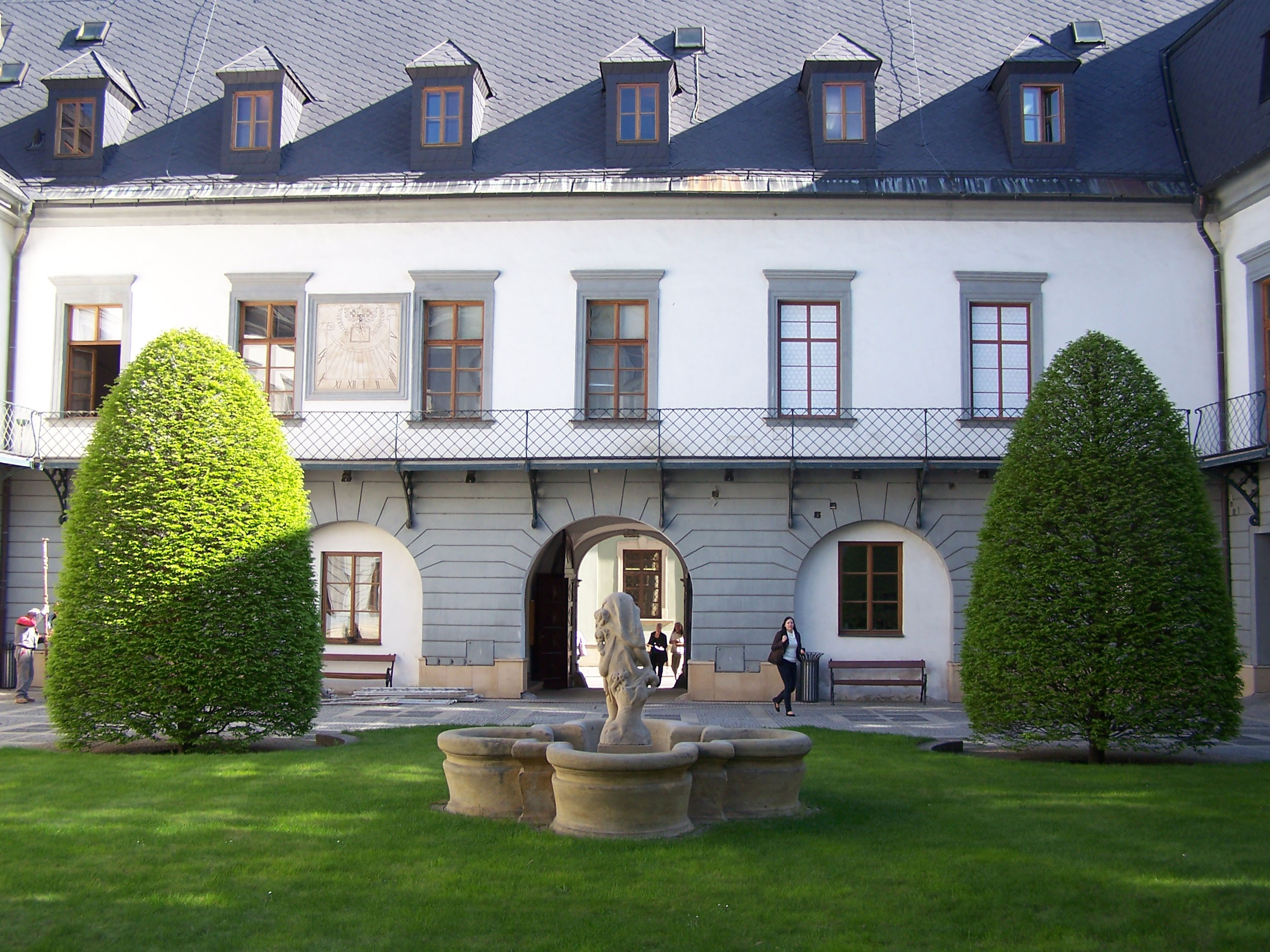
- Latin: Universitas Palackiana Olomucencis
- Type: Public
- Established: 1573; 453 years ago
- Affiliations: EUA
- Budget: 1,029,436,000 CZK (42,381,062 €)
- Rector: Michael Kohajda
- Students: 24,587, of that 4,041 international (year 2021)
- Location: Olomouc, Czech Republic; 49.59508°N 17.25914°E
- Campus: Urban
- Colors: Cobalt blue and Gold
- Website: upol.cz
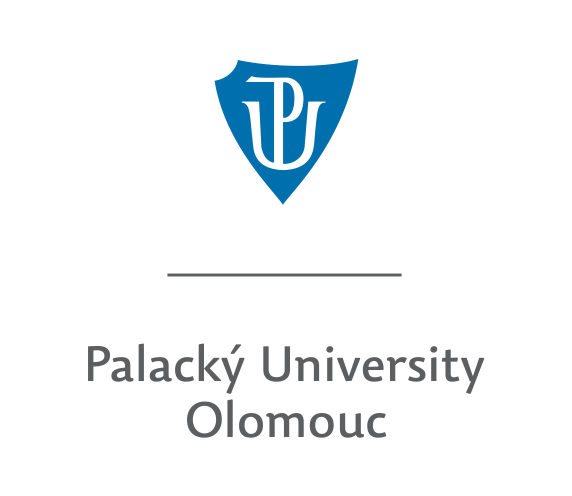

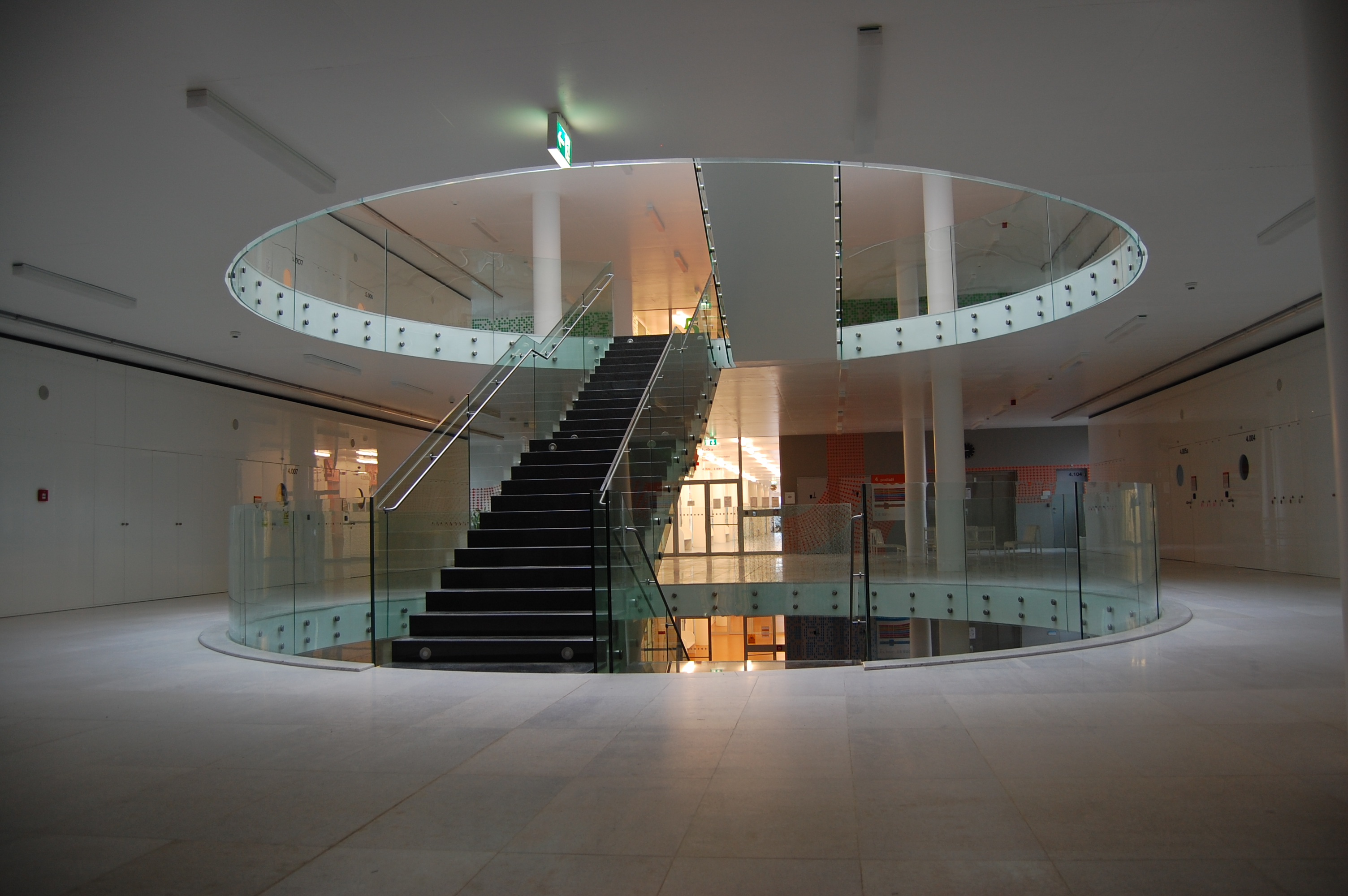
Faculty of Science stairwell

Palacký University Olomouc (Czech: Univerzita Palackého v Olomouci) is the oldest university in Moravia and the second-oldest in the Czech Republic. It was established in 1573 as a public university led by the Jesuit order in Olomouc, which was at that time the capital of Moravia and the seat of the episcopacy. At first it taught only theology, but soon the fields of philosophy, law and medicine were added.

After the Bohemian King Joseph II's reforms in the 1770s the university became increasingly state-directed, and today it is a public university. During the Revolution of 1848 university students and professors played an active role on the side of democratisation. The conservative king Francis Joseph I closed most of its faculties during the 1850s, but they were reopened by an act of the Interim National Assembly passed on 21 February 1946. This act also extended the name from University of Olomouc to Palacký University Olomouc, after František Palacký, a 19th-century Moravian historian and politician.

The city of Olomouc has the highest density of university students in Central Europe, with around 25,000 university students (including those at Moravian College Olomouc), compared to a population of 100,000 inhabitants. Notable people who have taught, worked and studied at the university include Albrecht von Wallenstein and Gregor Mendel.

== History ==
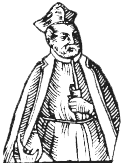
First Rector Hurtado Pérez (Mula, Spain 1526 – Olomouc 1594)

The university is the oldest in Moravia and the second oldest in the Czech Crown lands. Its foundation was an important element of the Counter-Reformation in Moravia, as the church of Rome began its fight back against Protestantism. Roughly 90% of the population of the Czech lands was already Protestant by the time the Habsburgs took over the throne in 1526. The Protestant Hussites were working for the provision of universal education, which was a particular challenge for the Catholics. By the middle of the century there was not a single town without a Protestant school in the Czech lands, and many had more than one, mostly with two to six teachers each. In Jihlava, a principal Protestant center in Moravia, there were six schools: two Czech, two German, one for girls and one teaching in Latin, which was at the level of a high / grammar school, lecturing on Latin, Greek and Hebrew, Rhetorics, Dialectics, fundamentals of Philosophy and fine arts, as well as religion according to the Lutheran Augustana. With the University of Prague also firmly in hands of Protestants, the local Catholic church was unable to compete in the field of education. Therefore, the Jesuits were invited, with the backing of the Catholic Habsburg rulers, to come to the Czech lands and establish a number of Catholic educational institutions, foremost the Academy in Prague and the one in Olomouc.

The Olomouc bishop Vilém Prusinovský z Víckova invited the Jesuits to Olomouc in 1566. The Jesuits established a monastery, and then progressively established the Gymnasium (school), the academy, the Priest Seminary, and the Seminary of St. Francis Xavier For Poor Students.

The college was promoted to university status in 1573, and thence the Latin: Collegium Nordicum and the Academy of Nobility were established. The university was closed during plagues in 1599 and 1623, and during the Bohemian Revolt in the Thirty Years' War. It was ransacked by the Swedish Empire's armies.

University rankings

Global – Overall
- QS World: =668 (2026)

In the Counter-Reformation and succeeding decades, it became significantly influential as the Jesuit grip loosened. In 1773, after the dissolution of the Jesuit order, it was turned into a secular institution run by the State. In the end, it was separated from the Olomouc episcopal institutions and relocated to Brno in 1778. It returned to Olomouc four years later, its status downgraded to that of a lyceum.

In 1827 it once again was promoted to University status. The short life of this renamed "Francis University" (Franzens-Universität Olmütz, 1827 – 1860) perhaps eclipses its high scientific standard (especially in natural sciences, law and medicine) and its political importance, particularly in the "Springtime of Peoples" during the Revolutions of 1848 in the Habsburg areas, when it became the centre of the struggle for national revival in Moravia. The Habsburg régime retaliated by closing most of the university in the 1850s. Olomouc's university was fully re-established in 1946, inaugurating the modern era of the university.

=== Before the university ===
Education in Olomouc had a long tradition before the Jesuit College obtained University status. As early as 1249 a school was established by the Bishop of Olomouc Bruno ze Šamberka. Lectures covered grammar, dialectic, rhetoric and liturgy. The first Master, Bohumil, was appointed in 1286. In 1492 the first college dignitary, Heřman, was appointed.

It is well known that Moravia was in the middle of the 16th century the land of the greatest religious freedom, and therefore it was famous in both the religious and laical European society as the den of the heresy. The majority of nobility was non-catholic, the schools and printing-shops established by the Unity of Bretheren were flourishing; on the other hand there were cries of Olomouc Catholic Bishops and of catholic kings Ferdinand and Maximilian about the bad standing of diocese, about the lack of clergy-men and their bad morals, disorders in schools as well as in monasteries, lack of financing etc.

— V. Nešpor, Dějiny university olomoucké

The college was rebuilt by Bishop Marek Khuen z Olomouce in 1564 to provide lectures both to public administrators and to prospective teachers. His successor Vilém Prusinovský z Víckova invited Jesuits to Olomouc in 1566. Several education initiatives rapidly ensued in the city: it is apparent that by 1567 the Jesuits were running the college. The Olomouc episcopacy pledged to finance the college with 500 Tolars a year (the amount was raised to 2000 Tolars a year in 1570).

=== Founding of the Jesuit University ===
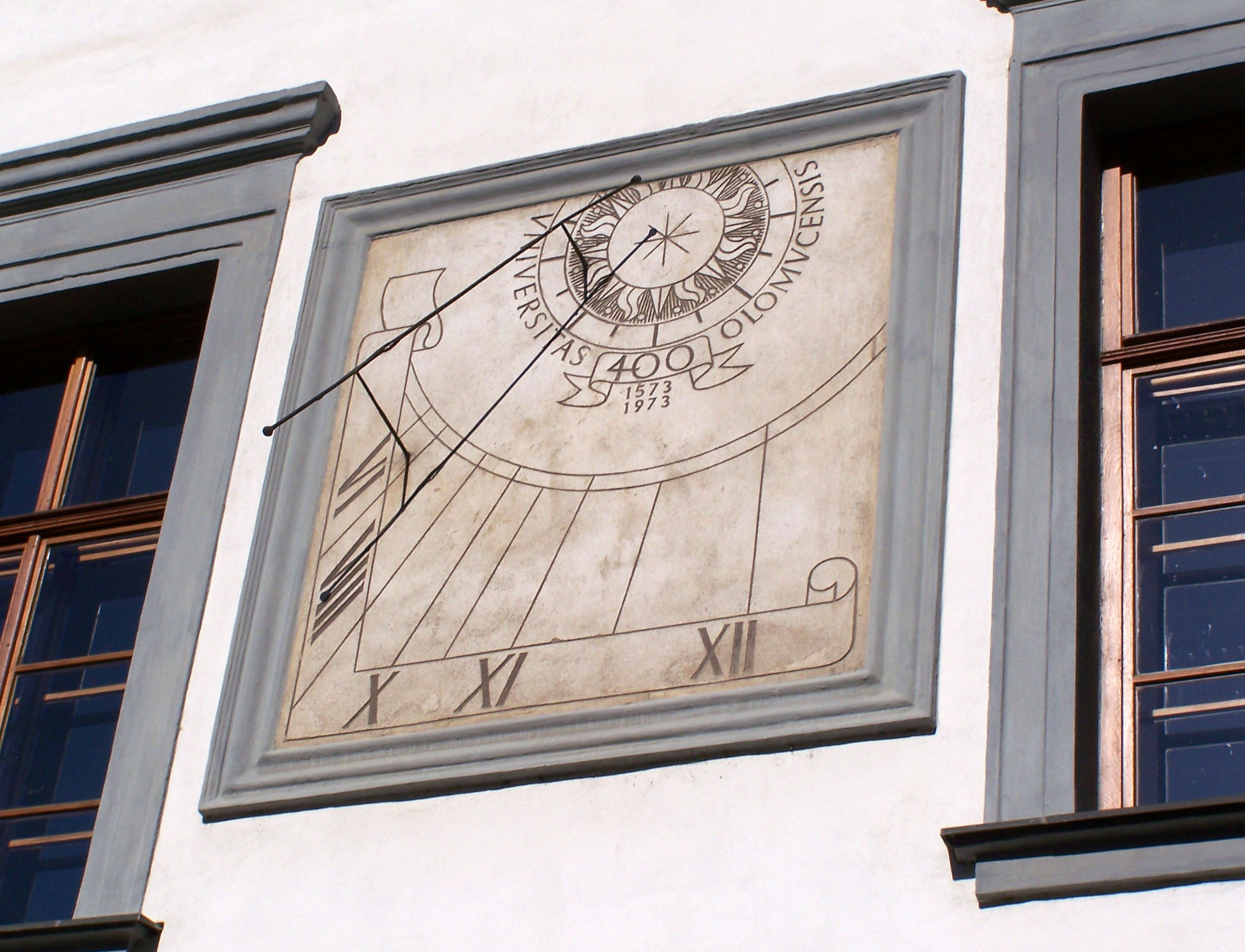
A sundial commemorating the quatercentenary of Olomouc University (1573–1973) on the facade of the Rector's Office Building

Jesuit instructors in Olomouc were as eager to procure converts to their religion as the Devil to pursue the soul.

— Nicolaus Olai Campanius (Swedish Protestant, student in 1605-?)

On 22 December 1573 Maximilian II, Holy Roman Emperor appointed Jan Grodecký to be Bishop of Olomouc and at the same time gave the Olomouc Jesuit College the right to award university degrees. The first rector was Hurtado Pérez (Mula, Spain 1526 – Olomouc 1594). University education itself started on 3 October 1576, when the Englishman George Warr started to lecture on philosophy. In the same year the first students were officially enrolled in the university's registry and the students were "subdued" in an admission ceremony, which was supposed to relieve them of base morals.

In 1578 the authority of the university was expanded by the creation of a special papal seminary (Latin: Seminarium Pontificium) called in Latin: Collegium Nordicum (a second Collegium Nordicum was established in Braunsberg; the one in Olomouc lasted until 1741) The previous sphere of responsibility, which had covered Silesia, Poland, Hungary and the Austrian lands as well as Moravia, was now broadened to include Germany, Scandinavia and Eastern Europe. The aim of the seminary was to create devoted and well-educated Catholic priests who would then return to their homelands, and there promote and protect the Catholic Church's interests and objectives.

In 1581 the university received an Imperial Privilege from the emperor Rudolf II, whereby degrees awarded by the Jesuit University had the same value as those from any comparable university. At the same time the privilege established university jurisdiction over students and professors, which meant that university members enjoyed a form of clerical immunity and could not face trial before civil courts even in respect of criminal proceedings. In 1582 the Bishop and Jesuits forced the Protestant school in Olomouc to close. Meanwhile, the bishop, Stanislav Pavlovský, called for the establishment of faculties of law and medicine. He was able to convince the rector, Bartoloměj Villerius, to support his proposal. Later in the 1588 the emperor Rudolf II, in a document written in Czech, gave his support for establishment of all these faculties; however the idea failed at the time due to lack of finance. In 1590 the university had about 600 students, while by 1617 their number exceeded one thousand. In the era before the Battle of White Mountain Olomouc University was composed of a grouping of connected and comprehensive colleges and dormitories. The areas taught were humaniora (preparation for university-level studies), philosophy (liberal arts), and theology.

Rudolf II was succeeded in 1612 by his brother, the Emperor Matthias who sought to install the fiercely Catholic Ferdinand of Styria on the Bohemian throne (which was conjoined with that of the March of Moravia), but in 1618 the Protestant Bohemian and Moravian noblemen, who feared losing religious freedom (two of the Protestant churches being already forcibly closed), started the Bohemian Revolt. Consequently, the Jesuits were driven out of Olomouc and the university ceased operating, only to be restored in 1621 after the revolt was crushed. The Jesuits and the university benefited considerably from the defeat of Protestants: most of the Protestant nobles were either executed or expelled after the Revolt and their properties were confiscated. Prior to the Revolt the university was mostly funded from donations of patrons. However, the new Emperor Ferdinand II gave the university several substantial estates which he had confiscated from the defeated rebels. Foremost among these was the manor of Nový Jičín which provided a good income. Other properties donated by the Emperor included a farm formerly owned by Jan Adam Prusínovský, a relative of the founder of the Jesuit college. From 1622 the entire education system of the Czech Crown lands was placed under Jesuit control, including even the University of Prague and the University of Wrocław (Silesia was also a Czech Crown land at the time). By 1631 the university had some 1100 students of which around thirty were annually conferred Doctor of Philosophy title. The lectures on mathematics allured so wide audience, that they eventually became open to public.

Students-at-arms
- In 1639 the Swedish Army besieged Olomouc. 400 University students joined the protection guard.
- In 1683 the Polish-Lithuanian army was passing Olomouc on its way to Battle of Vienna. 288 university students swore a military oath in the university aula and joined the troops in the fight against Ottomans.
- In 1848 the university students established armed academic legion of 382 men. Many of them left the town and took part in revolutionary actions in Vienna.

The Thirty Years' War (1618–48) prevented further development of the university. The Swedish kings wanted to destroy once and for all the bases from which the Catholic Church and the Jesuit Order drew the manpower and economic resources needed for their attempts to reintroduce the spiritual rule of Rome into the Scandinavian North. These were foremost the Jesuit College in Braunsberg, which fell into the Swedish hands in 1626, and Olomouc. The Swedes occupied Olomouc from 1642 to 1650. They plundered the university's vast library and the population of the town declined from over 30,000 to 1,675. As a result, Olomouc University's most precious relics are now in the National Library of Sweden in Stockholm, including 1,142 codices made under the patronage of Bishop of Olomouc Jindřich Zdík.

=== Revival and expansion after the Thirty Years' War ===
After the war ended the Jesuits started an extensive construction programme, building a series of imposing Baroque buildings for the Order and University in order to advertise their newly acquired domination of the Czech lands. This was happening against the background of savage re-Catholization which, along with war and plague saw the population decline from over 3 million to some 800,000 people. Even Czech was considered heresy by the Jesuits who were burning books written in Czech: the language was gradually reduced to nothing more than a means of communication between peasants, most of whom were illiterate. The era, generally described as the Dark Age of the Czech Nation, was nevertheless a period of expansion for the Jesuit University of Olomouc: several sciences were now taught at the university, including mathematics and physics (by Jakub Kresa and Jan Tesánek), and cartography (by Valentin Stansel). Hebrew was also studied. Among notable people connected with the university at the time are the mathematician Jan Marek Marci and the historian Bohuslav Balbín.

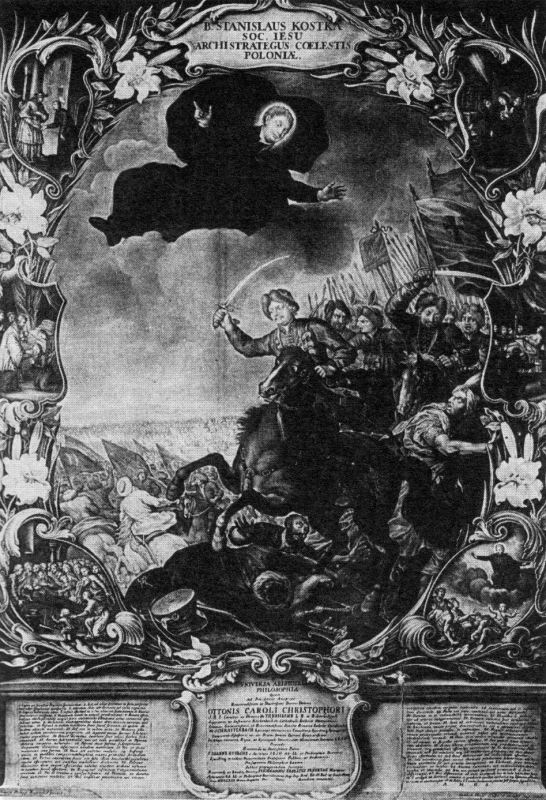
Olomouc University Thesis from 1713

The make-up of the university changed. Before the war the majority of lecturers were foreigners: now most of them were from Czech Crown lands. The number of students rose to 1,500 in 1727: in addition to locals there were many students from Hungary, Lusatia, Poland and Lithuania as well as from Russia.

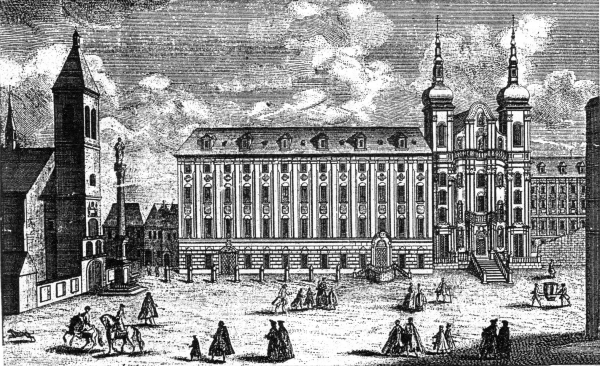
The Jesuit College building in 1724

Most of the older Protestant nobility having been either killed or expelled, the new Moravian nobility were keen to expand the range of areas taught beyond just theology and philosophy. Despite opposition from the Jesuits, the Emperor Leopold I authorized the introduction of legal studies in 1679. A vigorous power struggle between the Jesuits and secular legal professors ensued. Several interventions by Emperors were needed to keep the legal studies going during the following decades. Karel Ferdinand Irmler started to lecture in both canonical and secular law at the university. However, the quarrels with the rector became so intense that the nobility requested him to teach only secular law. Consequently, he was forbidden to give lectures at the university and had to teach in his home, while later professors gave law lectures in the building of Olomouc court. In 1725 the nobility forced the establishment of the Collegium Nobilium – the Academy of Nobility – by the decree of Emperor Charles VI. By this time the Emperor had compelled the Jesuits to accept without obstruction the study of secular law at the university. The law professors were lecturing at both the university and the academy (where in addition to law, economics, mathematics, geometry, history and geography along with architecture – both civil and military – were also now available). The academy remained in Olomouc until 1847, when it was relocated to Brno: here it became the basis for what was later to become the Brno University of Technology.

=== Under state control ===
During the rule of Queen Maria Theresa of Austria (from 1740 to her death in 1780) tertiary education in the Habsburg monarchy underwent reform in an effort to put it under state control. At Olomouc the Office of Faculty Directors was established in 1752: the directors were directly answerable to the Queen. In 1754 there were 10 professors of theology giving lectures to 241 students, 5 professors of philosophy giving lectures to 389 students and 3 professors of law giving lectures to 40 students. The number of students reached its peak in 1772, when there were altogether 1859 of them.

Meanwhile, in 1746, Faculty of Philosophy alumni Joseph von Petrasch established the first learned society in the lands under control of Austrian Habsburgs, the Societas eruditorum incognitorum in terris Austriacis. Not connected with the university, the Olomouc-based Society was publishing the first scientific journal in the monarchy, the Monatliche auszüge.

The power struggle between the empress Maria Theresa and Jesuits escalated in 1765. Until then, the position of university's Rector Magnificus was automatically in the hands of the rector of the Jesuit order. Firstly, the Empress took away the Jesuit's monopoly over the position by imposing that the Rector Magnificus was to be elected by academia. As a theologian was elected Rector Magnificus in 1765, the empress assumed the power and appointed her own favourite, secular professor of law Johann Heinrich Bösenselle, as the head of university in 1766. Meanwhile, the Empress decided to fortify the town heavily, in line with contemporary practice and reflecting the increased military threat from Prussia. The consequence of constraining the city within its upgraded fortifications was that scope for commercial development became very restricted. Olomouc's experience was in stark contrast with that of Brno to the south, which was further away from the Silesian war zones, and which became the centre of the Moravian Industrial Revolution.

In July 1773, responding to pressure from the new emperor, Pope Clement XIV dissolved the Jesuit Order and the university came under intensified state control. Several university buildings were taken over for use by the army, and by the end of the 1770s the university was left with only the St. Xavier's building (currently the Faculty of Theology). At the same time the main language was changed from Latin to German; Czech remained in use for lectures to trainee priests, who would need it to communicate with their congregations. Czech gained importance in the 1830s as part of the Czech National Revival.

=== Temporary relocation: the university downgraded ===
By the closing decades of the eighteenth century Brno had become the de facto capital of Moravia. This fact, as well as dissatisfaction with the university management due to persisting influence of the Church, led to the university relocating there in 1778. In Brno, the number of students declined to mere 575. There were nine professors at the faculty of theology, two at law and four at philosophy (one of which was professor of Political science, which would later become part of the faculty of law).

However, at the end of 1777 the diocese of Olomouc had been elevated to the status of an archdiocese, and in 1782 the first Archbishop of Olomouc Antonín Theodor Colloredo-Waldsee enforced relocation back by decree of Emperor Joseph II. At the same time the institution lost its university status, becoming a mere academic Lyceum. The Emperor had decided to retain only three universities, in Prague, Vienna, and Lemberg. Teaching of medicine became a separate field, in which surgeons and obstetricians' assistants were taught.

A history of persecutions

Olomouc University was a product of persecution: the Olomouc bishop invited Jesuits to convert local Protestants to Catholicism. Later the Olomouc Academic community itself suffered from a succession of tyrannies in the Czech lands:

- The Habsburg Absolutists put the university under state control in the 1750s, and eventually closed it (apart from the Faculty of Theology) in the 1850s.
- The German occupation of Czechoslovakia led to the closure of all Czech Universities in 1939 (see International Students' Day): students and professors from the Faculty of Theology were enslaved and deported to work in Germany.
- Following the 1948 communist coup d'état the Faculty of Theology was closed again in 1950, as part of a wider wave of oppression across the country.
- The Warsaw Pact invasion of Czechoslovakia in 1968 brought yet more persecution. One in four of the lecturers was affected in some way.

Significant loss of rights and privileges resulted from the change to an academic Lyceum. Legal jurisdiction over professors and students was no more: in 1783 the right to award Masters and Doctoral degrees was taken over by the Emperor (Bachelor degrees in philosophy were however awarded until 1821), and lectures were significantly cut back. However, after the death of Joseph II the situation gradually eased. Theology courses were restored to a full five years, while Philosophy was extended to three years and by 1810 Legal Studies took four years. By 1804 the Lyceum had some 730 students, which was comparable with University of Prague's 760. In 1805 studies were temporarily suspended, as many students entered the army during the Napoleonic Wars. Another suspension of lectures took place in 1809 because the Lyceum's buildings were taken over to accommodate army personnel. In 1826, there were altogether 26 professors at the Lyceum.

=== University status restored ===
Attempts to restore the Lyceum to full university status finally succeeded in 1827, when the Cardinal Archbishop of Olomouc, Rudolf Johannes Joseph Rainier von Habsburg-Lothringen (brother of the Emperor Francis II), persuaded the Emperor to promote the Lyceum, which now became the Francis University, with Faculties of Philosophy, Theology, and Law and School of Medicine and Surgery.

The university was again reaching its previous standard. For example, in 1839 there were seven law, seven philosophy and one theology doctoral degrees awarded, while 25 graduates obtained diploma in medicine and surgery. The number of students of Medicine and Surgery rose to some 100 every year, which was the second highest in the lands under control of Austrian Habsburgs (after University of Graz).

Olomouc became important centre of Czech National awakening. In 1834 the Department of Czech Language and Literature was established at the Academy.

=== Olomouc University in the year of revolutions ===
The 1848 revolution was welcomed by the university's students and professors. Some 11,000 people lived in Olomouc by this time, which was only a third of estimated population level back in 1600. The local garrison in 1848 nevertheless contained some 5,000 soldiers, which was a powerful anti-revolutionary force. Mostly the students and professors of law and philosophy were supportive of the Revolution, while the theologians distanced themselves from it. In March 1848 the students and professors petitioned the Emperor requesting, among other things, lectures in Czech and extensions to the university's freedoms and privileges. In response a group of monks including Johann Gregor Mendel, drafted a petition "in the interest of mankind" requesting scientific freedom to dedicate themselves exclusively to research and education without prejudice. Based on the handwriting the petition was written by Mendel himself. Later during the same month they established armed Academic Legion of 382 men: its first company consisted of lawyers while the second comprised philosophers and members of the medical faculty. Many of these left Olomouc in order to support the actions of revolutionary students in Vienna. Leading revolutionaries from Olomouc University included professors Ignác Jan Hanuš, Jan Helcelet and Andreas Ludwig Jeitteles. These, together with students, participated in associations and started newspapers in Czech and German. The black-red-golden flag of Burschenschaft waived over the university buildings.

Although many students were supporting the Revolution regardless of their ethnicity, there was a clear ideological split between the Czech and German partisans as to the aims of the Revolution. While the German faction supported the goal of a "Greater Germany", the Czech side favoured some form of democratic federation of Austrian and Slavic nations. The Czechs took part in the Prague Slavic Congress while the "Greater Germany" faction joined in the Frankfurt Congress. Growing government alarm was reflected at the Olomouc fortress which was in full combat readiness by July 1848, which was enough to deter revolutionary actions in the town.

By October 1848 the Revolution in this region had been defeated, and indeed the Emperor with his court moved to Olomouc where, at the archbishop's palace, he abdicated in favour of his nephew in December 1848. At the university, supporters of Revolution were persecuted, while many who had remained conservative (including, notably, Theology Faculty members) would in the longer term benefit from their restraint.

=== Decline and closure ===
Many of the professors were openly not favouring black and yellow (Austrian Empire's flag) nor Lesser Germany.

— Richard Zimprich: Die Professoren der k. k. Franzensuniversität zu Olmütz (1828–1855).

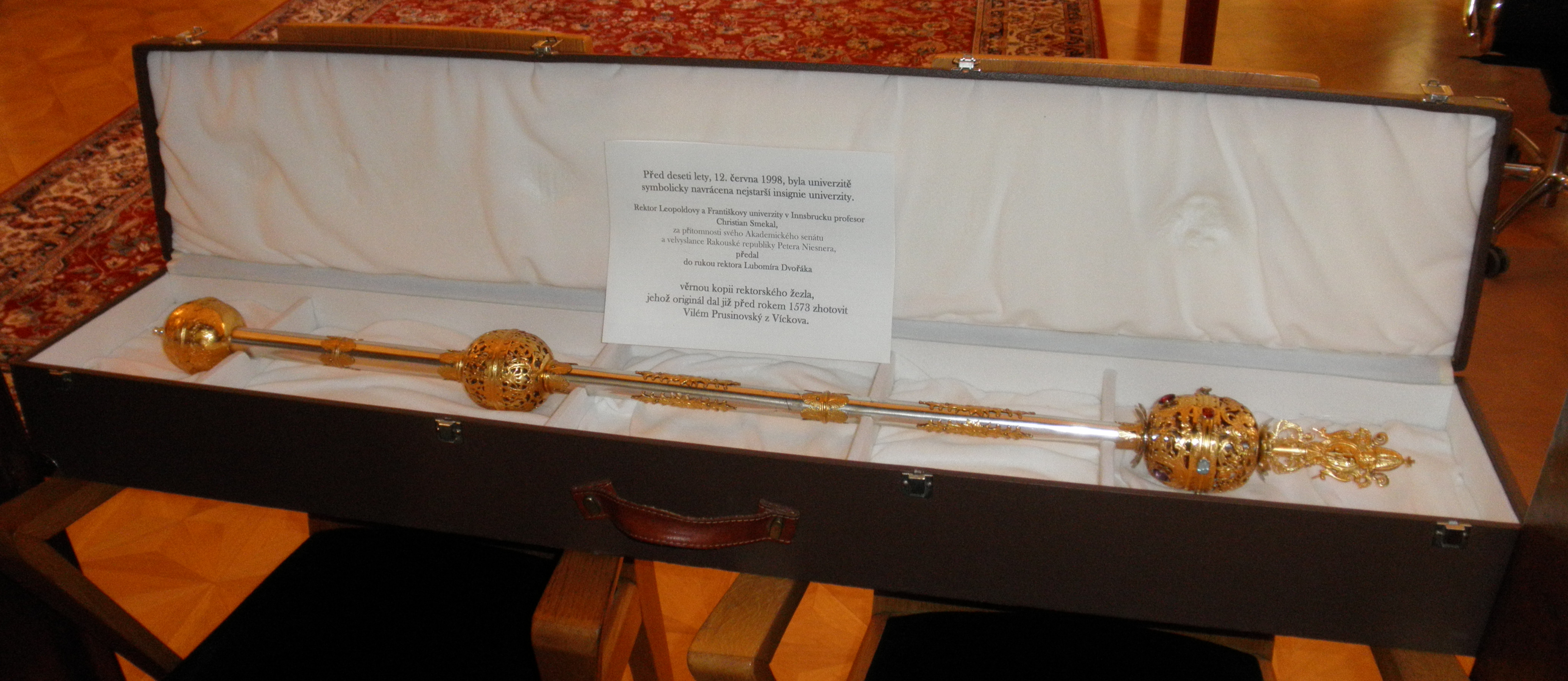
1998 copy of Olomouc University Rector's Mace - the original from ca. 1572 is as of 2013 still held by the Innsbruck University

The university came out of the revolution as an essentially bilingual (Czech and German) institution. In due course the university's support for the democratisation and the Czech National Revival brought retribution from the government in Vienna. In 1851, as the régime regained self-confidence, growing government intolerance of dissent and the subsequent decline in student numbers led to the closure of the Faculty of Philosophy. The Faculty of Law, which in 1849 had actually started teaching in Czech, was closed at the start of the 1855/56 academic year. In 1860 Emperor Franz Joseph I closed virtually the whole university. Only the independent Faculty of Theology and the independent University Library remained open, for nearly another eighty years, until, following the German invasion, all the Czech Universities were closed in November 1939. The School of Surgery also survived the emperor's decree in 1860, but closed in 1875.

Olomouc University's regalia were transferred to University of Innsbruck. Since the establishment of Czechoslovakia in 1918, the Czechs have been unsuccessfully requesting return of University of Olomouc original ceremonial equipment. The situation as of 2013 is as follows:

- The Olomouc University Rector's Chain from around 1566–1573 is used as the Innsbruck Medical University Rector's Chain
- The Olomouc University Rector's Mace from 1572 is used as the Innsbruck Faculty of Theology Dean's Mace
- The Olomouc Faculty of Philosophy Dean's Mace from 1588 is used as the Innsbruck Medical University Rector's Mace
- The Olomouc Faculty of Law Dean's mace from 1833 is used as the Innsbruck Faculty of Law Dean's Mace

There were efforts to reopen the university during the 1890s and again, after the establishment of an independent Czechoslovakia, in 1918, but all these attempts failed.

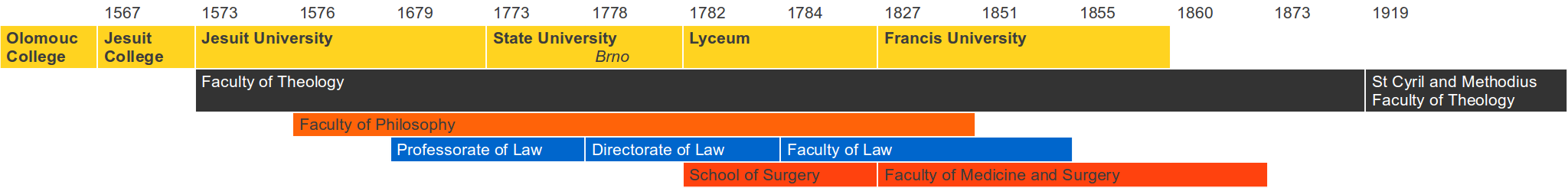
Evolution of Olomouc University before Germans closed the Faculty of Theology in 1939

=== Restoration of the university ===
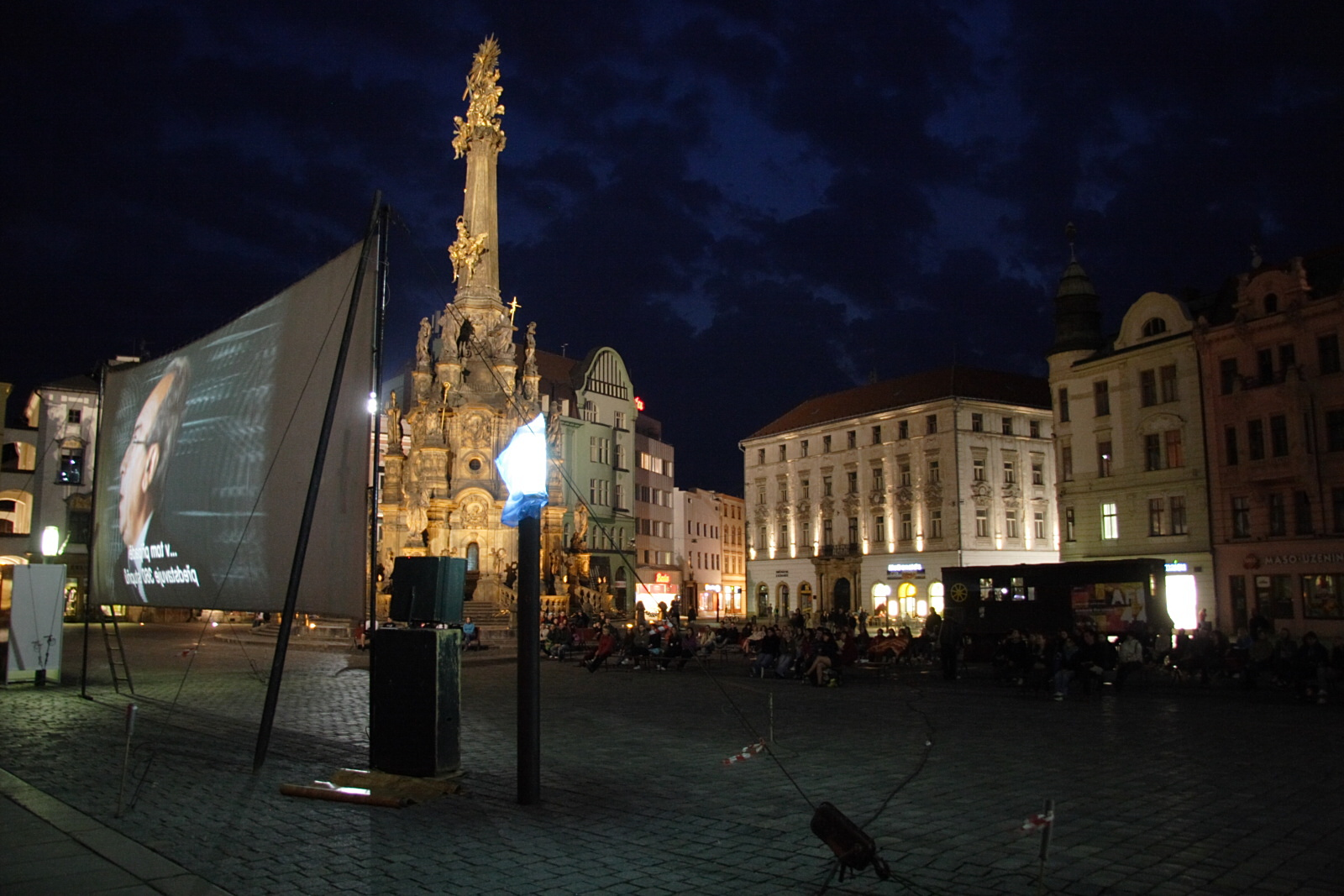
Photo from Academia Film Olomouc in 2009

On 21 February 1946 the Interim National Assembly passed the Olomouc University Restoration Act, which anticipated restoration of Faculties of Theology, Law, Medicine, Philosophy. Exactly one year later, the university was reopened, with no Faculty of Law but one of Education, which was established by a separate Act of 9 April 1946.

The Communist takeover in 1948 led to changes that would affect all Czech universities. Palacký University was hit by the persecutions, but since the university had only recently reopened, relatively few members of the Palacký academic community were affected. Nevertheless, in 1950 the Faculty of Theology was closed again, reflecting the Communist government's mistrust of the churches. The establishment in 1952 of the Olomouc School of Education (with faculties of Social Sciences and Natural Sciences) was followed by a gradual closure of the Faculty of Philosophy and Faculty of Education. Therefore, in years 1954–1958 the Palacký University had only Faculty of Medicine. The School of Education was itself closed in 1958, re-establishing once again the university's Faculty of Philosophy, and affiliating the Faculty of Science. The Faculty of Education was created later in 1964: the university, as in earlier centuries, once again consisted of four faculties.

The Interim National Assembly of the Czechoslovak Republic, wishing to undo hostile acts of the Austrian governments against the old University of Olomouc, has agreed as follows...

— The Preamble of the Olomouc University Restoration act No. 35/1946

During the Prague Spring, which attracted much international attention in 1968, many members of the Palacký academic community took part in democratisation efforts, seeking to move the ruling totalitarian dictatorship towards socialist democracy. The movement was crushed and the reforms reversed when combined Warsaw Pact armies from the Soviet Union, Bulgaria, East Germany, Hungary and Poland invaded Czechoslovakia. Soviet military occupation followed. At this time the Union of University Students of Bohemia and Moravia, a new student organisation, was established at Olomouc, and later organised student strikes in Autumn 1968. At the same time efforts were made to restore the Faculty of Theology, but they failed and it remained no more than a branch of the Charles University Theological Faculty of Litoměřice, and was forced to shut down again in 1974.

The Communist regime's efforts to "restore order" in a so-called Normalization process between 1969 and 1989, involved mass purges of academic staff, which in one way or another affected one lecturer in four.

In 1989 the Student Strike Committee was the only Velvet Revolution movement in Olomouc.

Today the university comprises 8 faculties with some 24,000 students.

The university is also the patron of the annual Academia Film Olomouc festival and the Festival of Film Animation and Contemporary Art.

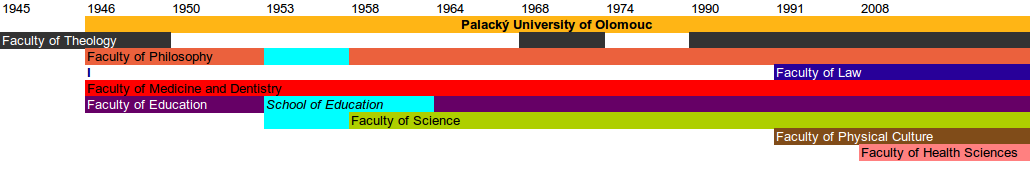
Evolution of Olomouc University after Second World War

=== Timeline ===
Palacký University Olomouc timeline

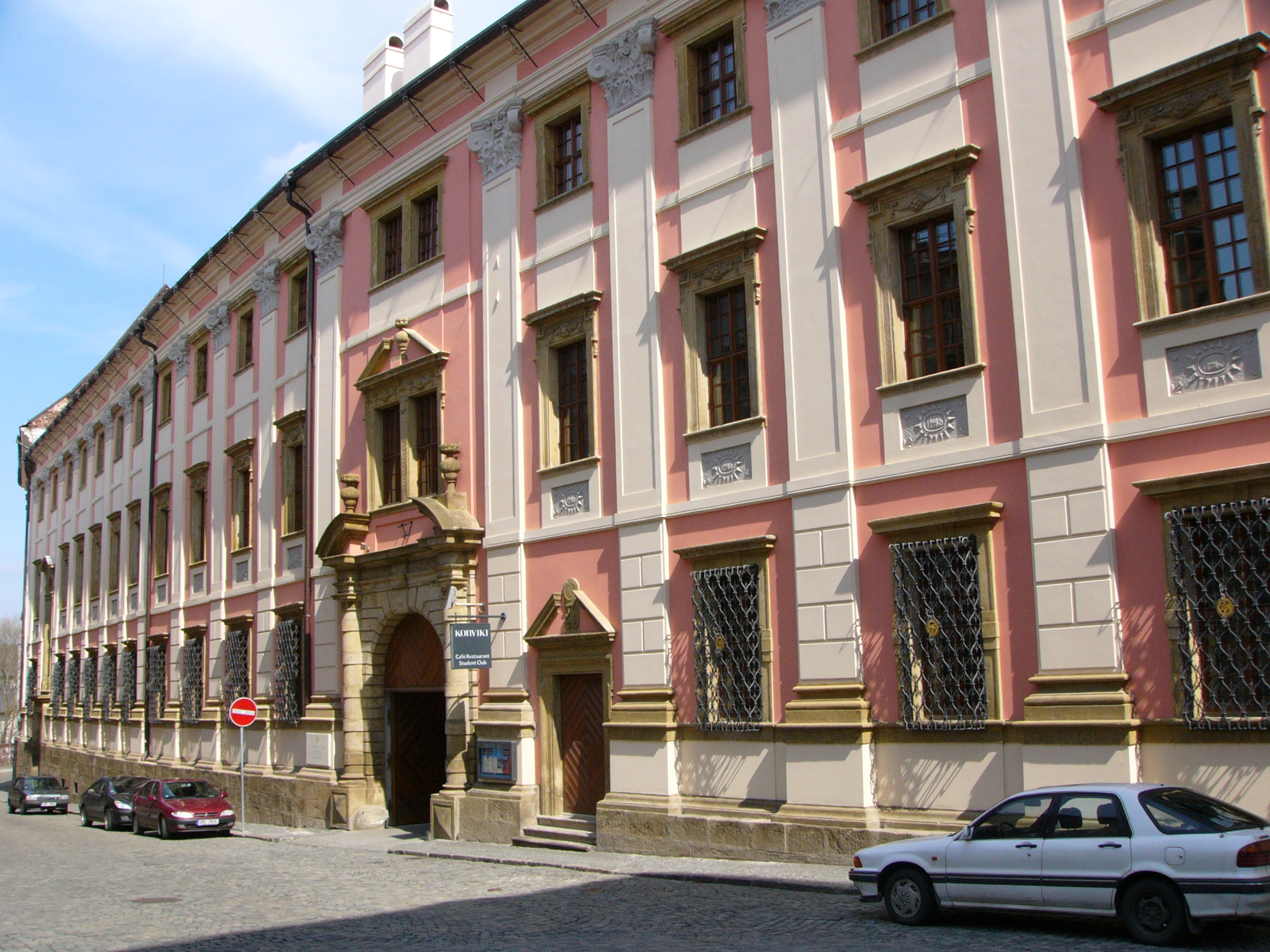
Reconstructed Jesuit building, which now serves as the University Art Centre

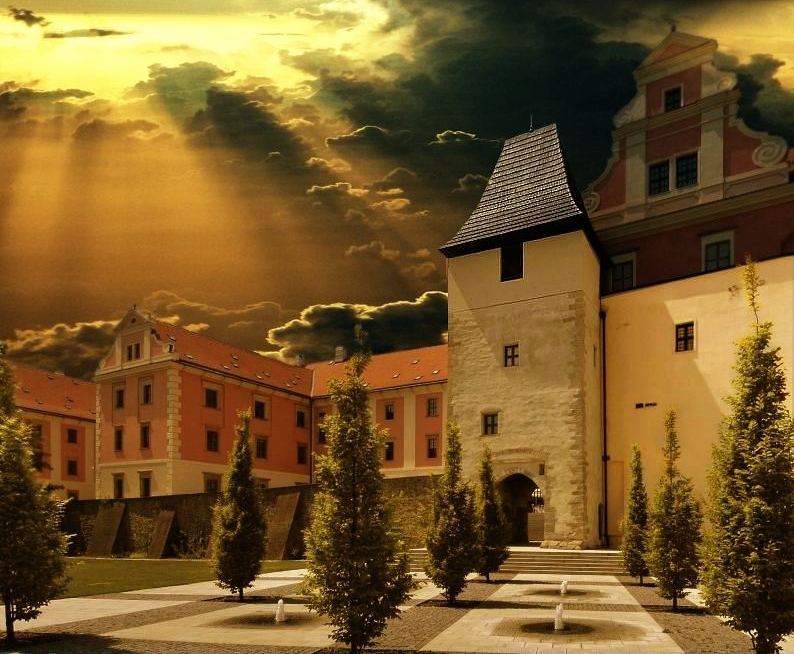
Courtyard of the University Art Centre

- 1573–1773: The Jesuit University. Gymnasium, initially philosophy and theology faculties, later also law and medicine
- 1773–1782: The State University. From 1778 to 1782 the university is temporarily relocated to Brno.
- 1782–1827: The Lyceum. After its return to Olomouc, the university has its status reduced to a Lyceum.
- 1827–1860: The Emperor Francis University. Emperor Francis II promotes Lyceum to University, Emperor Francis Joseph I dissolves the university.
- 1861–1946: Only the Faculty of Theology remains, independent of the university proper. (closed by Germans 1939–1945)
- 1946: The Palacký University. The Palacký University Restoration Act of 2 February restores the university with Faculties of Theology, Law, Medicine and Philosophy.
- 1947, 2 February: One year after the Restoration Act is passed, the university is opened with Faculties of Theology, Medicine, Philosophy and a Faculty of Education established by a separate act.
- 1950: The Faculty of Theology is dissolved.
- 1953: The School of Education is established with Faculties of Social Sciences and Natural Sciences. Later the Faculties of Education and Philosophy are dissolved.
- 1958: The Faculty of Science is established and the Faculty of Philosophy restored. Teacher training continues at the Educational Institute until its dissolution in 1964.
- 1964: The Faculty of Education is restored.
- 1968: The Faculty of Theology restores its function as a branch of Charles University Theological Faculty of Litoměřice
- 1974: The Faculty of Theology is once again shut down by force.
- 1989: The university has Faculties of Medicine, Philosophy, Education and Science. Another three Faculties are to be established after the Velvet revolution.
- 1990: The Faculty of Theology is restored.
- 1991: The Faculty of Physical Culture is established, while the 1946 Restoration Act is fulfilled by opening the Faculty of Law.
- 1998, 12 June: The University of Innsbruck donates an exact copy of the Rector's Mace.
- 2000: Reconstructed Armoury, in which the Central Library is sited, opens.
- 2002: The Arts Centre building opens in the reconstructed Jesuit building. Three art departments of the Faculty of Philosophy and two art departments of the Faculty of Education are sited there.
- 2003: The university accedes to Magna Charta Universatum to formally start the Bologna Process.
- 2008: The Faculty of Health Sciences is established.
- 2021: The Czech Advanced Technology and Research Institute (CATRIN) is established

Faculties students (31.12.2021)
Faculty	Students (intl. %)
Theology	1411 (6,8%
Philosophy	5364 (10,2%)
Law	1639 (5,2%)
Medicine	2424 (42,7%)
Education	5582 (1,8%)
Science	3674 (13%)
Physical Culture	1834 (3,8%)
Health Sciences	1055 (9,6%)

== Faculties ==
The Palacký University has eight faculties. These faculties are Theology, Arts, Law, Medicine and Dentistry, Education, Science, Physical Culture, and Health Sciences (in historical order).

There is no faculty of technology, as there are three technological universities within about hour's drive from Olomouc (Technical University in Ostrava to the North, University of Technology in Brno to the South and Tomáš Baťa University in Zlín to the East).

=== Saints Cyril and Methodius Faculty of Theology ===
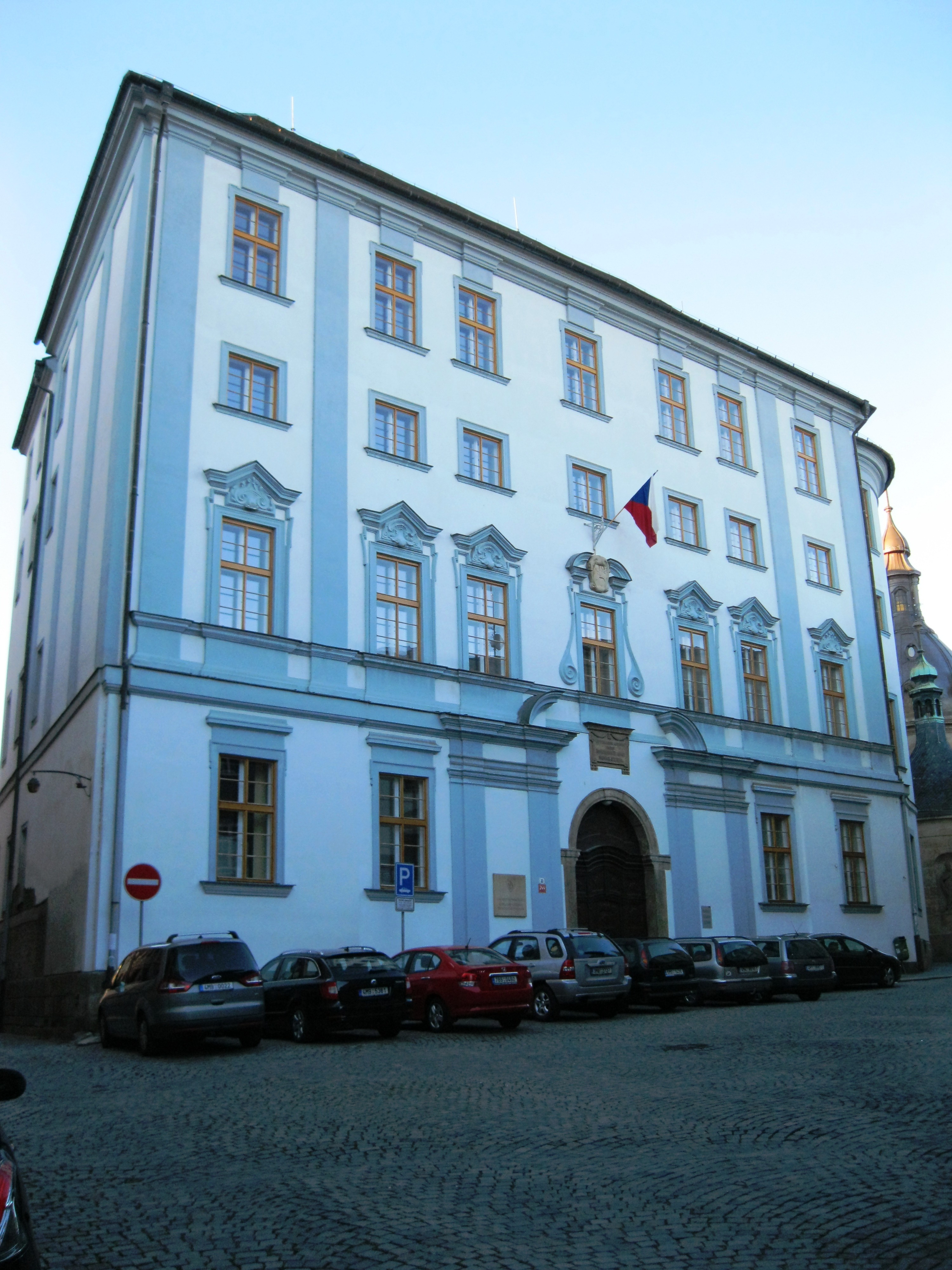
Saints Cyril and Methodius Faculty of Theology building from 1675, rebuilt to current form in 1718

The Faculty of Theology is the oldest one, being there already in 1573 when the Olomouc College was promoted to the university. It was perceived by the Czech Protestant population as the core symbol of recatholization forced by Habsburgs, which led to the Jesuits being driven out of Olomouc at the beginning of the Bohemian Revolt and whole university being closed in the years 1618–1621. The Faculty of Theology continued to have university privileges, including the right to award university degrees even when the university itself was downgraded to Lyceum in the years 1782–1827. Following the Habsburg repression of the university in 1860, it was the only functioning faculty up until the re-establishment of the whole University in 1946, together with the University Library safeguarding the continuation between the old and re-established University of Olomouc. The faculty's name was extended to Saints Cyril and Methodius Faculty of Theology in 1919. It was closed by the Germans in 1939–1945 with its students and professors being enslaved and deported to work in Germany. It was closed again by the communists in 1950–1968 and repeatedly in 1974–1989.

While historically the faculty was preparing future priests, its mission was extended in 1992. The faculty offers bachelor's degrees and master's degrees in Theology, in Catholic Pedagogy run in collaboration with the Faculty of Education, and in Social and Charitative Work run in collaboration with College of Social Work Olomouc. It also offers Doctorates of Theology in three fields as well as lifelong learning.

In 2000 a student of the faculty, Václav Novák, uncovered child sex abuse case of Catholic priest František Merta. Novák also alleged, that the archbishop of Olomouc Jan Graubner was aware of the abuse, but instead of involving the state authorities he covered evidence and introduced policy of transferring abusive priests to different parishes. While František Merta was convicted, Jan Graubner's involvement has been never substantially proven. Václav Novák was later that year kicked out of the faculty for alleged non-fulfilment of study duties, while Novák asserted that his exclusion is in fact punishment for uncovering Graubner's participation in the child sex abuse case.

As the Czech Republic has one of the least religious populations in the world, the Catholic Church faces lack of Czechs interested in being ordinated as priests. Shortages of Czech priest students and priests both generally and at the Faculty of Theology are balanced by their importation from other countries, foremost from Poland.

=== Arts ===
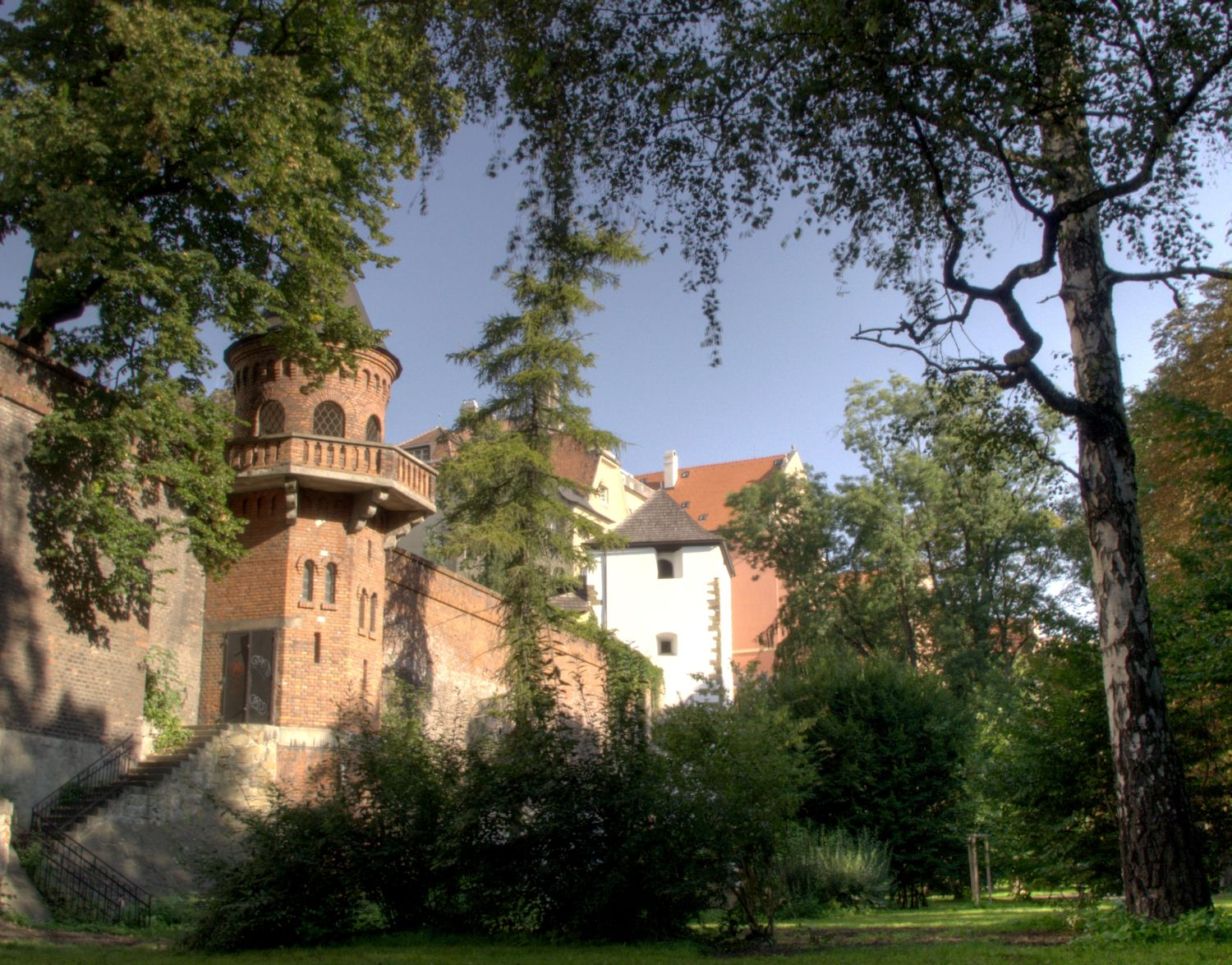
The Faculty of Arts and the University Arts Centre are sited on top of the town's fortification, overseeing a park

The Faculty of Arts (Faculty of Liberal Arts in the traditional sense) was established three years after the Olomouc College got University rights. Englishman George Warr professed the first lecture on logics on 3 October 1576. From the beginning it was teaching the liberal arts, the Trivium (grammar, rhetoric, dialectics) which led to the Baccalaureus degree, and the Quadrivium (arithmetic, music, geometry and astronomy) which led to the Magister degree. Sharing the fate of Theological faculty in years 1618–1621, it saw a great revival with not so much the field of philosophy, but the fields of science, mathematics, physics, astronomy, cartography and finally also genetics being pursued by notable persons connected to the faculty (however these fields are today read at the Faculty of Science). Following the Olomouc University students' participation in 1848 revolution the Faculty of Philosophy was the first one to be suppressed by the Habsburgs in 1851. It was reestablished in 1946. With 1953 establishment of the School of Education of Olomouc the Palacký University Faculty of Philosophy was dissolved until being reopened in 1958.

As of 2021, students can study more than 600 combinations of subjects in the large spectrum of humanities, social sciences, linguistics and arts integration. Some may be studied by distance education, and others are also offered as lifelong learning.

The Faculty of Arts offers bachelor's and master's degrees in Philology of Chinese, Czech, Dutch, English, French, German, Italian, Japanese, Polish, Portuguese, Russian, Spanish and Ukrainian. In the field of languages it further offers degrees on English, French, Dutch, Polish, Russian, Ukrainian and Japanese, all of them with specialization in Applied economics. There are further studies of history, Musicology, Psychology, the Theory and History of the Dramatic Arts, the Theory and History of the Visual Arts, Political Science and European Studies, Euroculture as Erasmus Mundus programme, Adult Education, Philosophy, Sociology, Archives Keeping, Journalism, Social sciences, Jewish Studies and many of other programmes.

Students who plan to teach at secondary schools can obtain the required qualifications by passing courses in pedagogy and psychology during the late part of their study.

The Faculty offers doctoral studies in Czech, Czech literature, French Literature, Romance languages, German, German literature, English and American literature, English, Russian, Polish, Czech history and Slovak history, general history, auxiliary historical sciences, political science, philosophy, sociology, clinical psychology, educational psychology, andragogy, theory of literature, theory and history of literature, theatre and film, theory and history of fine arts, theory and history of music.

The Centre for Distance Learning, together with other departments, offers a wide range of activities for the general public (e.g. courses of graphology, courses for social workers, etc.).

The Faculty also provides courses for international students, such as the long-running Summer School of Slavonic Studies.

In 2020, the faculty had 5,449 students.

=== Law ===
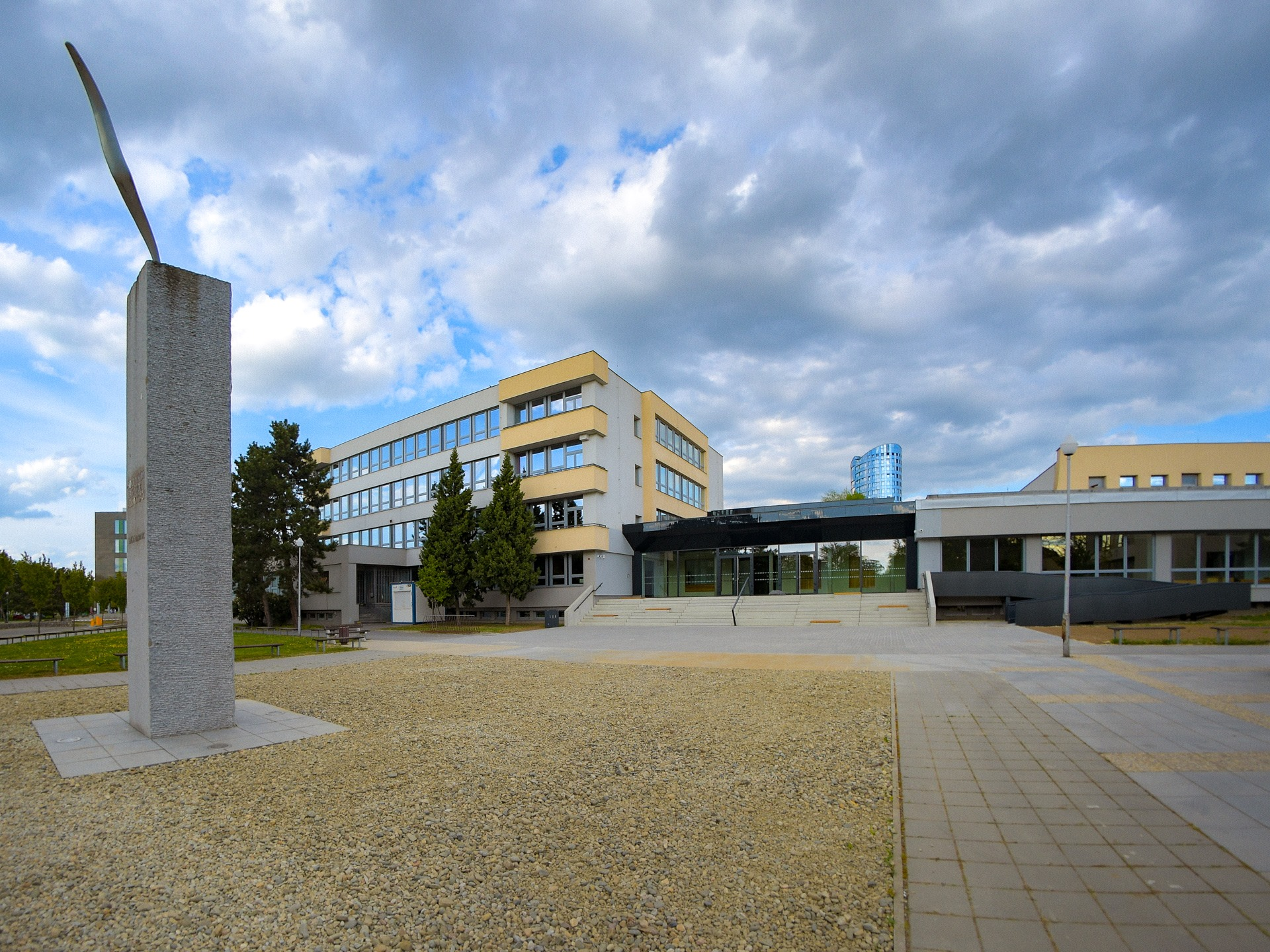
Faculty of Law building. Before the Velvet Revolution it was the regional headquarters of the Communist Party of Czechoslovakia

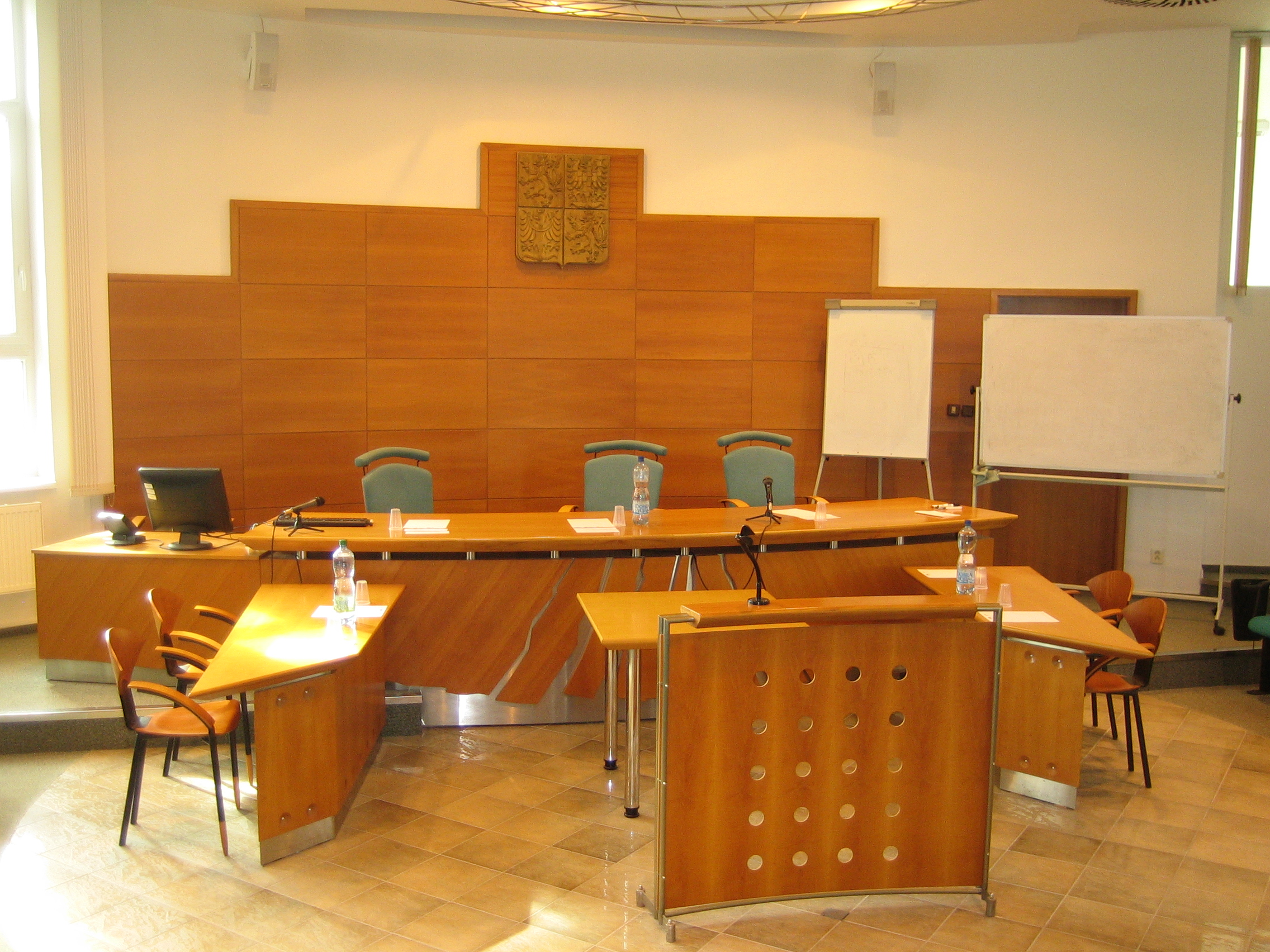
Faculty's courtroom

Although there were attempts in the 1580s to establish also Faculties of Law and Medicine, they failed due to lack of financing. While Canon law was read at the Faculty of Theology since 1667, it was especially the Moravian Nobility, which pursued establishment of secular Professorate of Law in 1679 by a decree of Emperor Leopold I. The first Olomouc professor of law was Karel Ferdinand Irmler. The secular legal studies faced very strong opposition from the Jesuits: initially the professors taught at private premises, while later the lectures were held at the Olomouc Court of Law. Large number of Emperors' interventions was needed to secure continuation of legal studies in following decades. Since 1709 the Olomouc University law professors were appointed directly by the Emperor, in 1714 the Jesuits were forced to accept secular legal lectures within the university grounds. The situation improved after establishment of the Academy of Nobility in 1725 (law professors taught at both the university and academy). In 1732 Olomouc became the first law school in the Habsburg monarchy to teach Fief and Public law at an independent department. Later, in 1755, the lectures were extended to cover also international and natural law. In 1766 the first non-Jesuit University Rector was appointed – the professor of law Johann Heinrich Bösenselle.

In the 1760s the Olomouc law school became the centre of the Enlightenment in the Habsburg monarchy with professor Josef Vratislav Monse as its most important figure facing very strong opposition of the Jesuits. In 1778 the Professorate was elevated to Directorate, and it officially became fully fledged Faculty of Law in 1784, entering its best era before 1848 Revolution. The professors and students of law were the main force of the Revolution in Olomouc.

Being forced to shut down by the Habsburg régime at the beginning of study year 1855/1856, it was re-established by the Olomouc University Restoration Act of 1946, however in fact the faculty could be reopened only following the Velvet Revolution, in 1991. In its new era, the faculty became one of the pioneers of clinical legal education in the Continental Europe.

In 1996 it was the first law school in Central Europe to introduce legal clinics and even now it is the only faculty in the Czech Republic that provides to its students wide range of clinical education. The clinics were quickly expanded and improved, especially after 2006 thanks to a project to advance practical education, which gained financial support from both the Czech national budget and from the European Social Fund. In 2011 there were more than 15 clinical subjects.

The Faculty offers four programmes: a five-year-long master's degree in Law and Legal Theory, a three-year-long Bachelor's degree in Legal specialisation aimed at public administration workers, a two-year-long postgraduate master's degree in European studies with focus on European law (offered also as double degree with University of Salzburg Faculty of Law) and a doctorate in Theoretical legal science. The Juris Utrisque Doctor degree (JUDr.) may be also obtained.

In 2020, the faculty had 1,663 students.

=== Medicine and Dentistry ===
Medical lectures started in 1753 at the Faculty of Philosophy. As the university was relocated to Brno in 1778, the Department of Surgery was established by the Faculty of Philosophy. This department in 1782 became the university's Department of Surgery. The Department of Medicine and Surgery was disaffiliated in 1849 and continued operation independently until it was closed later in 1873. The faculty was reestablished in 1946. With the Faculty of Law not being actually reopened in the 1950s, the Faculty of Theology being suppressed by the communists in 1950 and with Faculty of Philosophy being closed in 1954, it was the sole faculty of the university from year 1954 to year 1958, in which the Faculty of Philosophy was reestablished while the new Faculty of Science opened.

The Faculty of Medicine and Dentistry offers six-year-long Masters programs of General Medicine and five-year-long programs of Dentistry. Both programs may be studied completely either in Czech or English. The faculty also offers 23 doctoral programs in Czech and English.

Practical education is carried out mostly at the Olomouc Faculty Hospital. The hospital is with its 1407 beds and 49 departments and clinics (year 2010) the largest one in Olomouc Region. It was established in 1892 and opened four years later. Its Eye Clinic was the place of the world's first successful tissue transplantation in 1905 (performed by Eduard Konrad Zirm). During the years 1992–2004 it was enlarged and modernised and today it is one of the most modern Czech hospitals. In 2014, the new building for the Institute of Molecular and Translational Medicine was constructed. The Institute focuses on basic and translational biomedical research with an aim to better understand the underlying cause of human infectious diseases and cancer, and to develop future human medicines, medical devices and diagnostics.

The faculty's long-term research and development focuses on four fields: oncology, heart disease and vein disorders, experimental toxicology and pharmacology, and organ transplants. The research teams focus on molecular biology, immunology and epidemiology.

In 2019, the faculty had 2,312 students.

=== Education ===
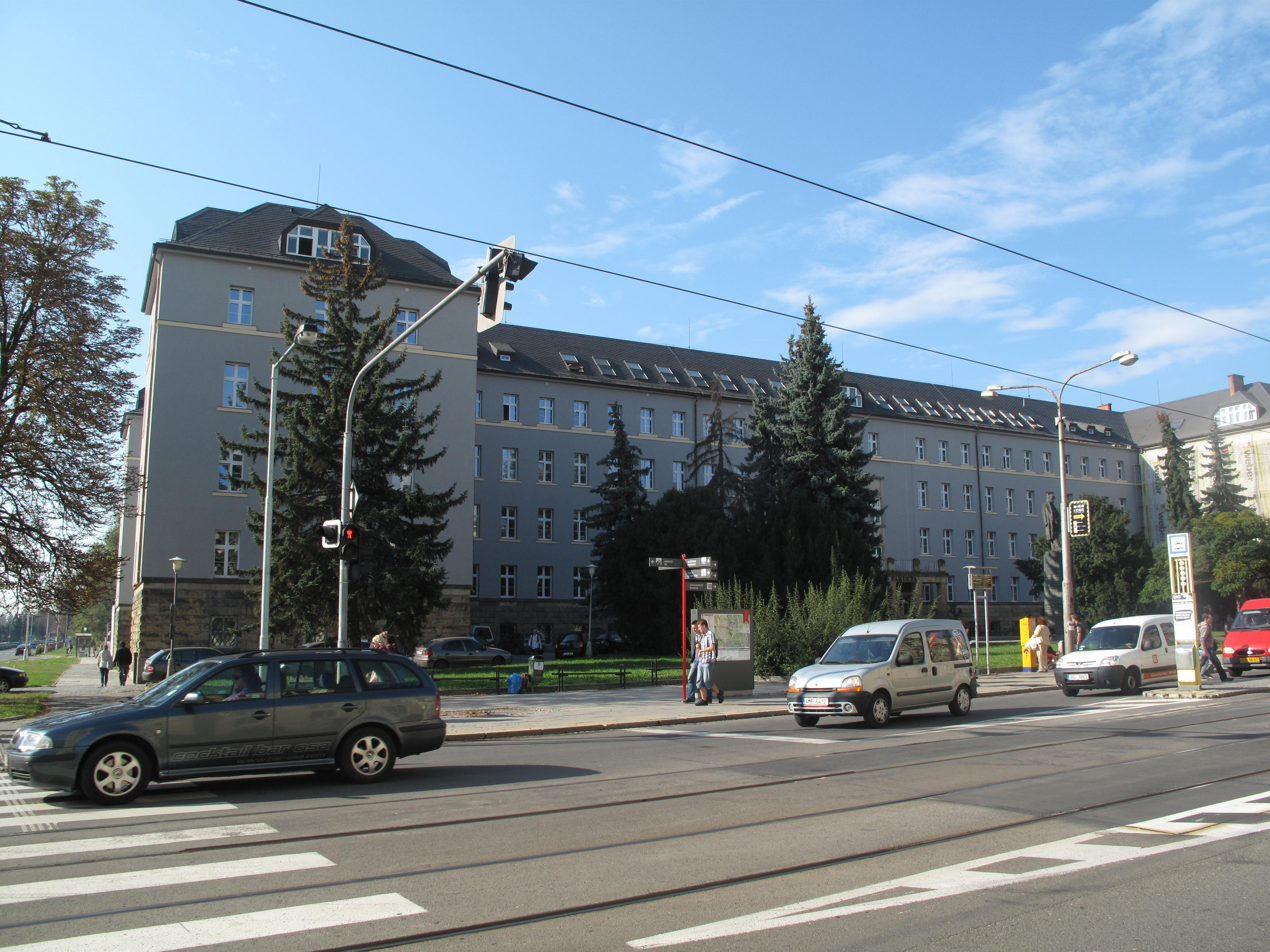
Faculty of Education building

While other faculties were reestablished by the Olomouc University Restoration Act of 21 February 1946, the Faculty of Education was established by a separate act of April 1946: after a 1945 Beneš decree the interim Czechoslovak parliament passed the law which created educational faculties in existing universities (the ones in other universities were closed by the German occupiers in 1939).

Being established 1946 the Faculty of Education was educating future teachers of kindergarten and primary and secondary schools, as well as providing courses for those already teaching. Education of prospective secondary school teachers was done jointly with the Faculty of Philosophy (in the fields of music, drawing and physical arts). The year 1953 brought complete reform of teacher training methods. The faculty became the base for the newly established School of Education (separate from the university), so between 1954 and 1964 the faculty in its former sense did not exist. Teacher training for kindergartens and the first four years of primary education was conducted by the universities, while prospective teachers of years 5−8 of primary schools were educated in specialist higher schools (there was none of this type in Olomouc). In 1960 the so-called "educational institutes" were established to educate prospective primary school teachers. Another reform of 1964 transformed these institutes into faculties of education and integrated them into the existing universities. This opened the current period of the faculty's history. Since 1990 the faculty has specialised foremost in education of prospective primary- and secondary-school teachers.

The Faculty of Education provides tertiary education to prospective teachers of kindergartens, grammar schools, secondary schools and other pedagogical and educational establishments. It also educates public employees of both the government and quango sectors. The faculty offers bachelor's degrees, master's degrees and Doctorates of Philosophy, as well as appointing professors.

In 2019, the faculty had 4,931 students.

=== Science ===
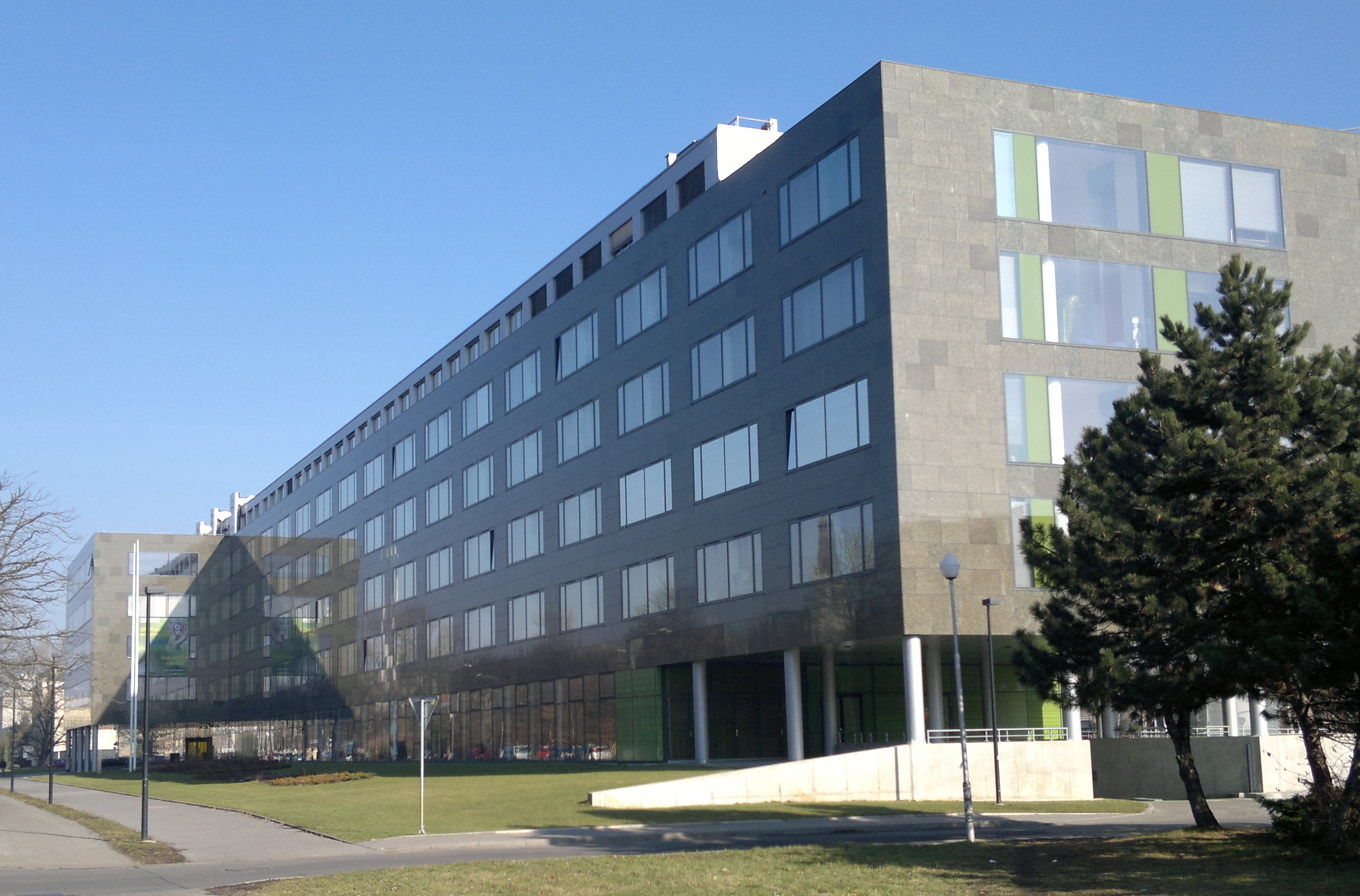
Faculty of Science main building

The fields of science, mathematics, physics, astronomy, cartography as well as genetics were pursued already by notable persons connected to the old Olomouc University's Faculty of Philosophy. In 1953 the Olomouc School of Education was established with Faculty of Social Sciences and Faculty of Natural Sciences. The latter one was in 1958 incorporated into the university as the Faculty of Science.

The Faculty of Science is oriented to research and offers Bachelor's degrees, Master's degrees and Doctorates of Philosophy in various fields such as mathematics, physics, chemistry, biology, Earth sciences, and so on. Since 2009 the faculty has residence in a new building not far from the city center, between the Faculty of Law and the university halls of residence. The biology workshops and some laboratories are situated on their own small campus at the south-east edge of the city.

In 2019, the number of students was 3371.

=== Physical Culture ===
The Faculty of Physical Culture was established in 1991. It has many different programmes, including education of prospective teachers of physical education (PE), Physical therapy, recreation and public security. These may be studied in three-year-long Bachelor's and 2-year-long postgraduate Master's programmes. The faculty also has the doctoral program of Kinanthropology.

Its research efforts focus in fields of issues and prevention of physical, mental and sociological health of a man in relation to physical activities; basic problems of the human motor system, its diagnosis and improvement; methodological problems of education of PE; development of new fields and finding solutions issues of specific fields.

With the Neředín hall of residence (used mostly by foreign students) the faculty's buildings constitute a small campus on the western outskirts of the city.

In 2019, the faculty had 1,719 students.

=== Health Sciences ===
The Faculty of Health Sciences was founded in 2008, and so it is the youngest of the eight faculties. It was established by spinning off some fields from the Faculty of Medicine.

Since 1992 the Faculty of Medicine had offered bachelor programmes of Nursing and Therapeutic Rehabilitation and Physiotherapy. In 1996 the Institute of Nursing Practice and Theory was established at the faculty. This act of separation was supported by Virginia Commonwealth University and led to the empowerment of the field. Since 2000 the Masters program of Economics and Management of Health Services has been taught. In 2002 other fields were added such as Obstetric Assistant. In 2003 a vice-dean for these fields was appointed for the first time. In 2006 the faculty's structure changed by the creation of the Center of Health (Non-Physician) Fields, which later became the base for the Faculty of Health Sciences.

In 2019, the faculty had 821 students.

== Research Institute ==
=== The Czech Advanced Technology and Research Institute (CATRIN) ===
The research centre is dedicated to interdisciplinary research in nanotechnology, biotechnology, and biomedicine. It focuses on the development of new technologies for clean energy and sustainable environment and for their application in practice. CATRIN was established in 2020 as a Palacký University higher education institute by integrating the scientific teams of the Centre of the Region Haná for Biotechnology and Agricultural Research (CRH), the Regional Centre of Advanced Technologies and Materials (RCPTM), and the Institute of Molecular and Translational Medicine (ITM).

== Facilities ==
=== Academic Sports Centre ===
The Academic Sports Centre offers sports, excursions, and other activities for University students and employees. The offer covers dozens of fields from yoga, dance, callanetics, firearms shooting, and martial arts to team sports, paintball, equestrianism and golf.

There are several University buildings provided for these activities. The University Sports Hall meets Olympic Games requirements for volleyball, basketball and handball matches. The whole complex of outdoor sports grounds together with the university docks appertain to the hall. Another gymnasium is at the buildings of the Faculty of Physical Culture (on the Neředín campus), and another is next to the Olomouc Hockey Stadium. Others are within halls of residence.

University sport championships are not major events in the Czech Republic as they are in the United States for example. So many students' sporting life is connected more with Olomouc town (especially when it comes to supporting a team); different Olomouc sport clubs play in national and international leagues, such SK Sigma Olomouc and 1. HFK Olomouc (football), HC Olomouc (ice hockey), and Skokani Olomouc (baseball).

=== Computer Centre ===
The Computer Centre oversees university IT systems to support science and research activities, lectures and university administration. It is also responsible for implementing modern technologies and technical support as well as training University employees in their use.

Most University buildings have free Wi-Fi, while nearly every dormitory room has a high speed wired LAN connection.

=== University Library ===
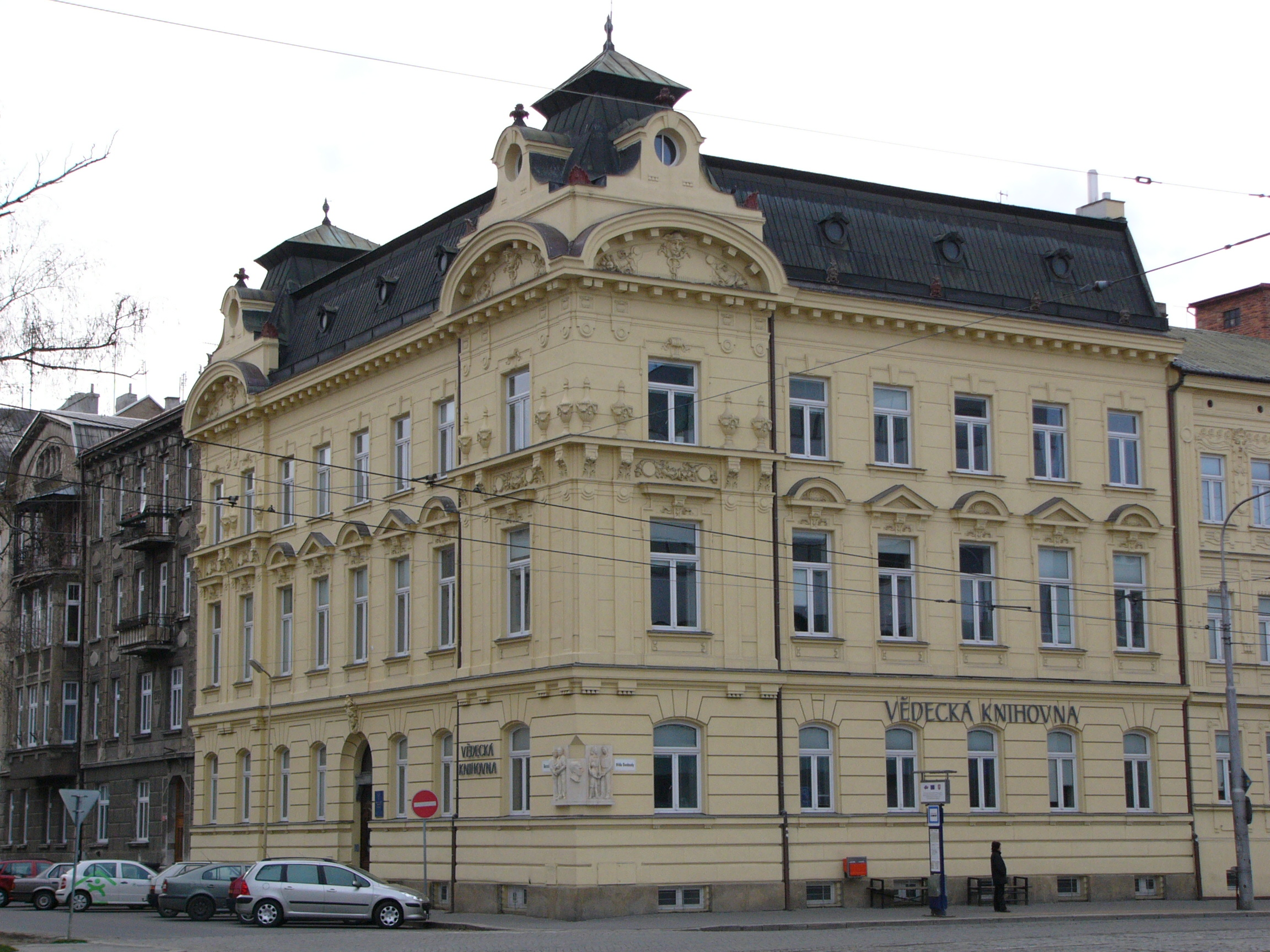
The Research Library in Olomouc main building

The library was established as the Jesuits were invited to Olomouc in 1566 to take control over the Olomouc College. Its bookstock consisted primarily of donations from bishops and noblemen. Particular generosity was shown by Vilém Prusinovský z Víckova, the Bishop of Olomouc, who gave the college to the Jesuits and allowed them to take for it any Greek or Latin books from the episcopal library.

The Swedish occupation of Olomouc from 1642 to 1650 led to total ruination of the library. Everything that had any value was stolen (including 1,142 codices made under the patronage of the Bishop of Olomouc Jindřich Zdíka), while the rest was destroyed. Altogether some 100 wagons fully loaded with books and scripts were dispatched to Sweden. As a result, Olomouc University's most precious relics are now in the National Library of Sweden in Stockholm. The library was nevertheless restored relatively rapidly after the Swedes left.

Under the Jesuits the library was open only to the university's lecturers and students. Following the dissolution of the order in 1773 it was reconstituted as the Public University Library, with the stress on more widely shared access. At the same time library funds from Moravian Jesuit Colleges that had been closed down were transferred to Olomouc University Library. Later on, funds from dissolved monasteries also found their way into the same budget.

The library continued in operation, together with the Faculty of Theology, after the university was closed down in 1860: this has ensured some continuity between the old and re-established universities in Olomouc. When the university was closed, the library held over 250,000 volumes. Then, the library's responsibilities included holding a copy of everything printed in Moravia (and for part of the period in Silesia). This would support the rapid and efficient development of scientific work after the re-establishment of university in 1946.

Initially, in 1946 the University Library remained under the direct control of Ministry of Culture. It was renamed the Research Library in Olomouc in 1960 and placed under regional control, it retained, and still retains, the function of a public University Library. It is still administered separately from the university.

Nowadays the University Library itself is divided between the Central Library and a series of specialist libraries, most of them attached to the appropriate university faculty.

==== Central Library (Armoury) ====
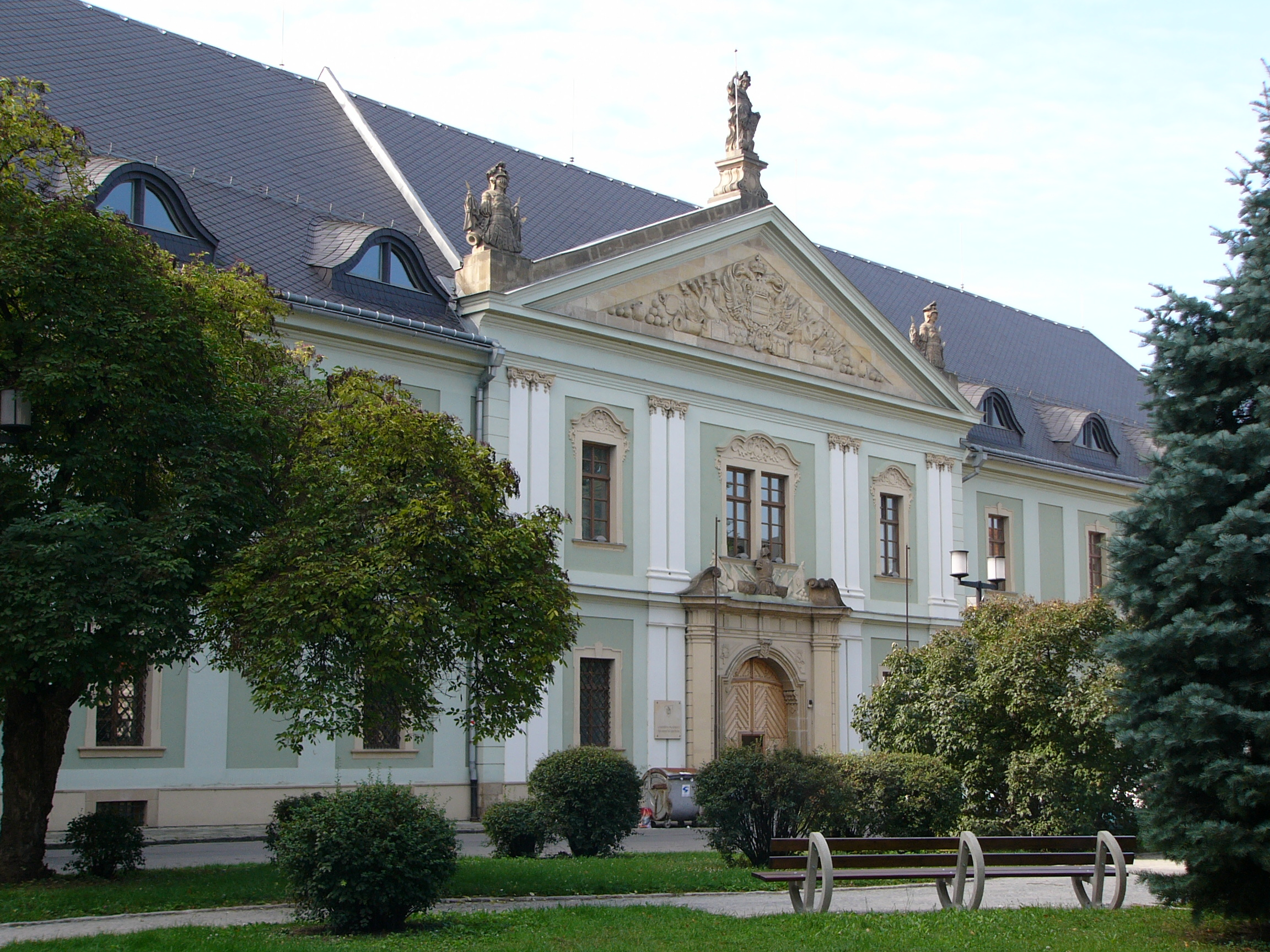
The Palacký University Central Library, known as the Armoury

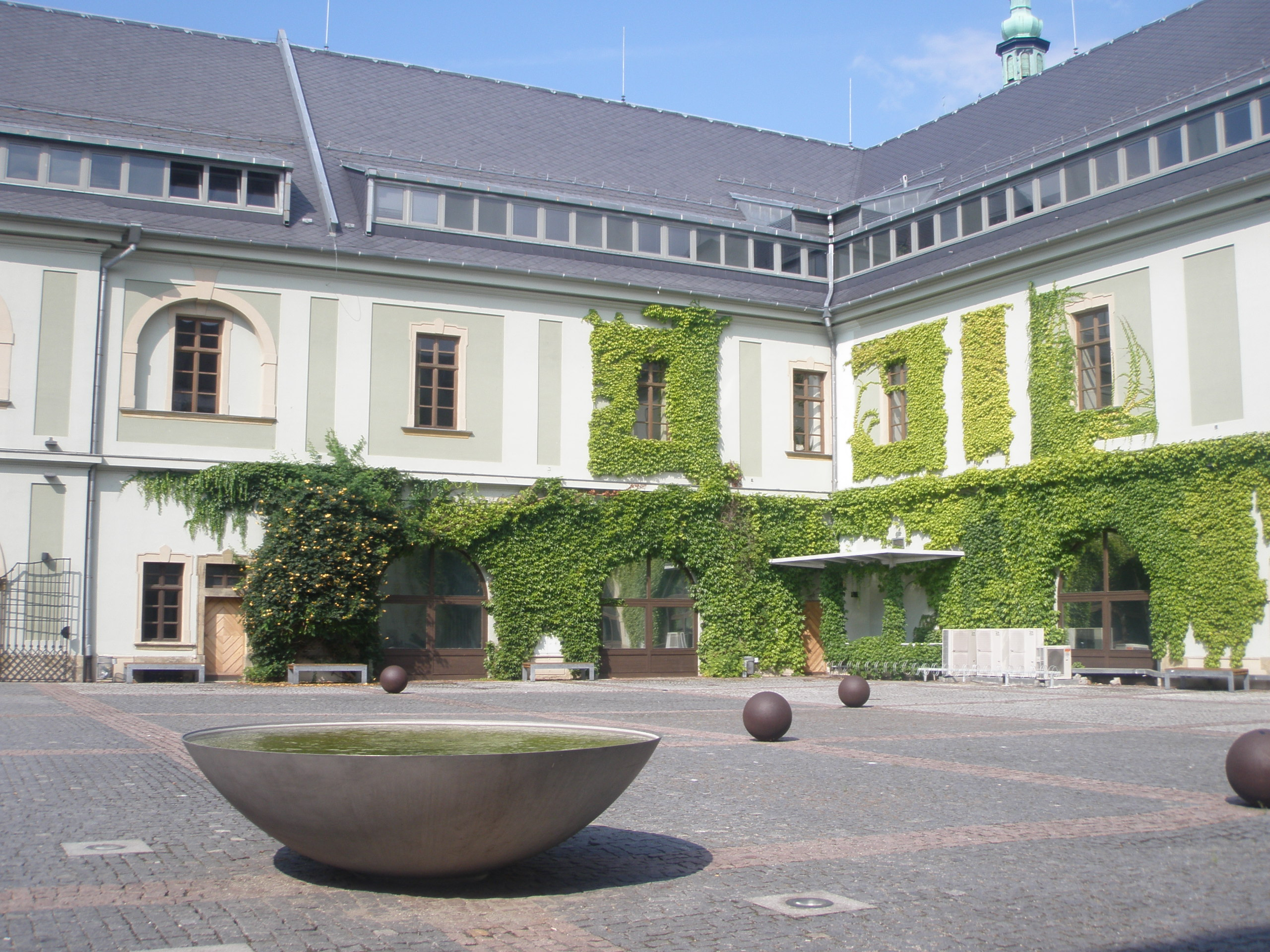
The Armoury courtyard

The Central Library, known as the Armoury (Czech: Zbrojnice), is situated in the historic building of the former Theresian Artillery armoury almost in the town centre, directly in front of the Archbishop's Palace and next to the university Rectory and Philosophy Faculty.

In the Campaigns of 1742, the Habsburg monarchy lost most of Silesia and Kłodzko (now in Poland) which were both Lands under the Czech Crown prior to 1742. Olomouc suddenly found itself close to the frontier with Prussia. The Empress Maria Theresa therefore decided to fortify the town. Olomouc's fortifications were extensively upgraded to match contemporary weapons. The artillery armoury became part of the fortification. Military considerations received absolute priority, and the Armoury was built right next to the Archbishop's palace: ecclesiastical buildings (such as the former Academy of Noblemen) were even demolished to make space for it. Construction of the Armoury was completed in 1771.

Strictly symmetrical both inside and out, the building is relatively large, featuring the military architecture characteristic of the period. Today the armoury is recognized as one of the most important buildings in Olomouc.

The Armoury was used by the military until 1989 (the Czech Army Joint Forces still have their headquasters in Olomouc today). After the Velvet Revolution, the armoury became the property of the university: it was then decided to accommodate the information centre in it. However, the building was in very poor condition and needed extensive reconstruction.

Reconstruction started in 1992 and in 1997 the Central Library opened. However, it was not until 2000 that the building works were finished and the whole building could be opened. The Central Library occupies about half of the Armoury, while the rest is occupied by the Centre for Information Technologies, the University Press, the University Archive and the Eurocentre.

==== Other libraries ====
The Saints Cyril and Methodius Faculty of Theology and the Faculties of Medicine and Dentistry, Science, Education, Physical Culture, Law, and Health Sciences each have their own libraries; the Faculty of Education's is called the Study Hall.

The British Centre Library is housed on the university grounds and run by the British Council.

=== Project Service ===
The University Project Service is an information and consultancy centre which assists those wishing to obtain grants and donations. It also manages administrative and financial aspects of given projects and it lectures on the topic.

=== Accommodation and dining facilities ===
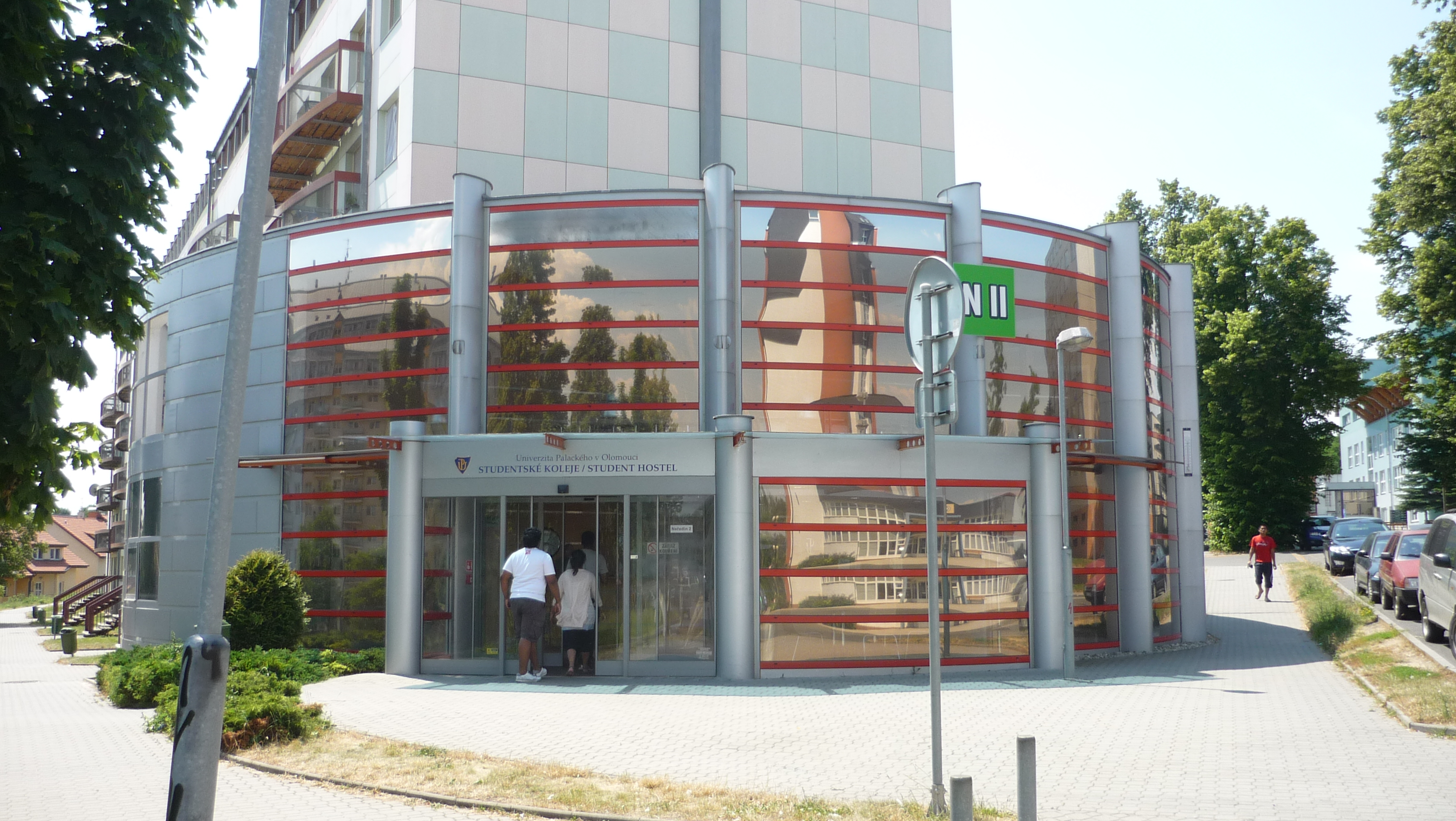
Neředín halls of residence. Before the Velvet Revolution it was a barracks for the Soviet occupation army

The university offers year-round accommodation and dining facilities for students and university employees, as well as for the general public when there is spare capacity. Especially during the summer months, when most students vacate dormitories, it offers accommodation and boarding for both individual tourists and large groups (conferences, sports championships, and so on). The dormitories have more than 5,300 beds, while the boarding services are used by more than 6,500 people daily. Most of the dormitories are either close to the city centre (by the new Faculty of Science building) or on the outskirts, at the Neředín campus of the Faculty of Physical Culture, with some buildings in other parts of town.

As the university is self-governing, and the dormitories are part of the university, there is also a UP Dormitory Council. Students in halls vote for representatives (usually one for each building) to represent them on the council. The Accommodation and Dining Facilities management need the council's approval in case of price increase, or if they want to evict a student for order disturbances.

=== Science and Technology Park ===
The Science and Technology Park aims to bridge the gap between the academical-scientific world and private business, to use the university research potential in cooperation with private companies. It also helps starting entrepreneurs through its Business Incubator. Special attention is paid to fields of nanotechnology, biotechnology and information technology. It also manages the catalogue of university apparatus and services to make it accessible to private companies.

=== Palacký University Press ===
Palacký University Press has been publishing academic literature since the beginning of 1990s. It publishes more than 200 new titles every year. It focuses on specialized monographies, medical publications, textbooks as well as extensive pictorial publications regarding the fields of history, art history and photography. It also publishes various peer-reviewed journals, most of them in electronic and Open Access form.

=== Confucius Institute ===
The Confucius Institute provides Chinese schooling. It follows in the footsteps of Karel Slavíček (1678–1735), alumnus of the Faculty of Philosophy, who was the first Czech sinologist. He wrote a treatise on Chinese music and was also the author of the first precise map of Beijing.

== Governance ==
There are three basic types of university with different level of state control in the Czech Republic. All of them need state accreditation to award university degrees.
- Public Universities are financed mostly by the state, yet are independent and self-governed.
- State Universities have very limited self-governance, typically they are not even legal personalities, formally they are components of state administration units. There are only two of them in the Czech republic – the Universities of the Ministries of Defence and of the Interior
- Private Universities need only accreditation, otherwise they are free from state control, as well as from state financing.

Czech universities have a long tradition of self-governance and independence from state interference, which goes back to the Middle Ages. Today, self-governance is assured by the University Education Act No. 111/1998 (the Act deals only with public universities). The following governance bodies are similar for all Czech public universities.

=== Academic Senate ===
The Academic Senate of a Czech public university is its self-governance representative body. According to the law it shall have at least eleven members, with at least one third and at most one half of its members being students. The Palacký University Academic Senate has twenty-four members, of which eight are students, the minimum of one third. Senators are elected by secret ballot for a period of three years. The students' and lecturers' curia are elected separately. Each faculty is represented by two lecturers and one student (independent of the number of faculty students).

The Academic Senate has the most important role in the life of the university, as most acts of other university administration are either governed by rules and regulations adopted by the Senate (such as the Statute of university) or require the approval of the Senate (such as the yearly budget of the university). The Senate adopts internal regulations, it controls the use of university finances and property, and following the rector's proposal it appoints and dismisses members of the Scholarly Board, Disciplinary Commission, and so on.

The Senate also nominates a candidate for the position of rector (who is appointed by the president of the Czech Republic). The nomination must be agreed by a simple majority of all senators, while a dismissal must be agreed by at least three-fifths of all senators. The vote to elect or repeal a rector is secret, while other Senate votes are open. A senator may not also be the rector, vice-rector, a faculty dean or a vice-dean.

The Palacký University Academic Senate has also two commissions: the Economic Commission and the Legislative Commission.

=== Rector ===
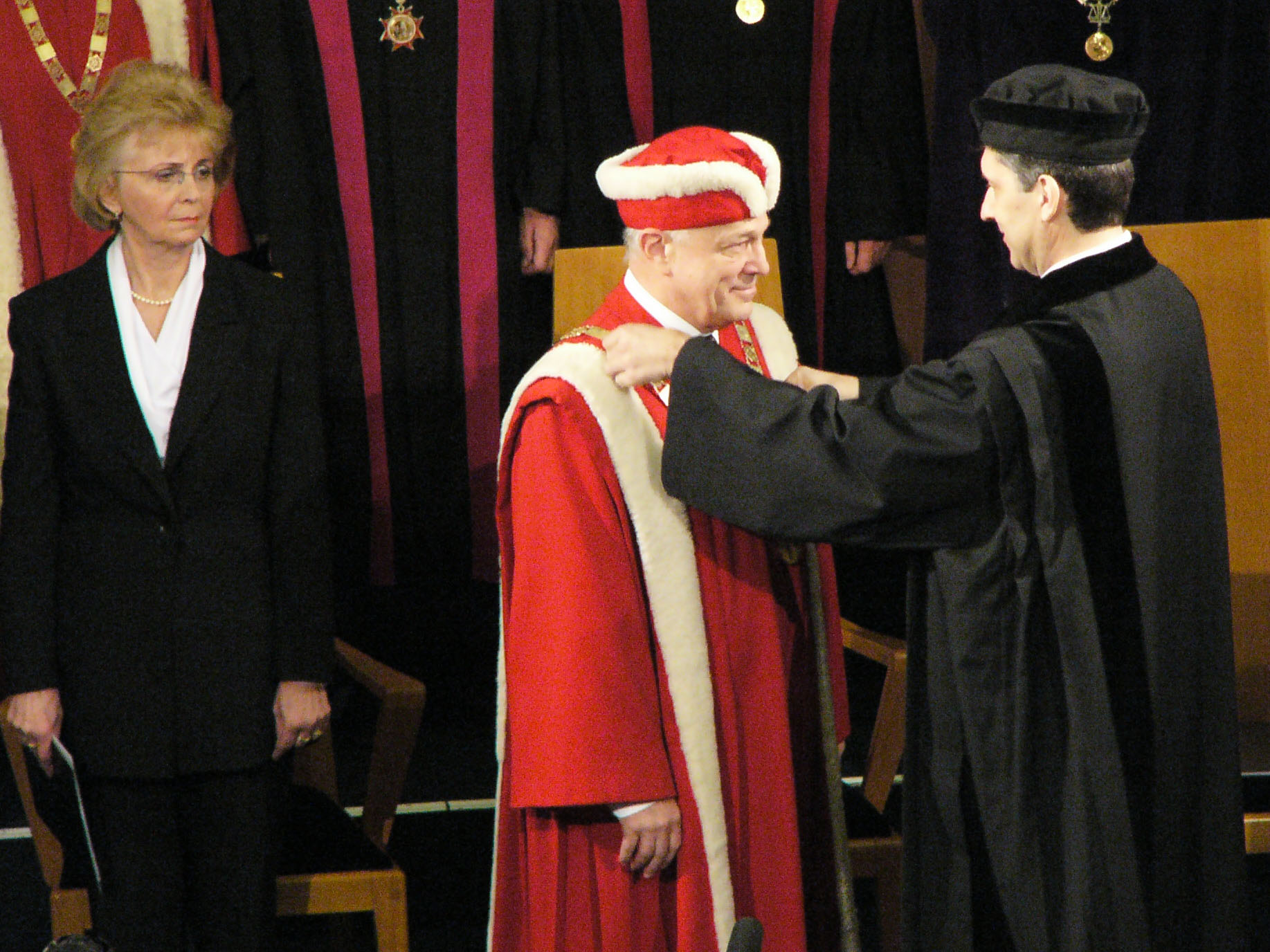
Inauguration of Lubomír Dvořák, 1997–2000 and 2006–2010 Palacký University Rector

The Rector is the head of the university. The Rector acts in the name of the university and decides the university's affairs unless prohibited by law. The Rector is nominated by the University Academical Senate and appointed by the President of the Czech Republic. The term of office is four years and a person may hold it for at most two consecutive terms.

The rector appoints vice-rectors, who act as deputies to the extent the rector determines. Rectors' salaries are determined directly by the Minister of Education.

The first rector was in 1573 Hurtado Pérez. Until 1765, the position of Rector Magnificus was automatically in the hands of the rector of Jesuit Order. The first non-jesuit Rector was in 1766 Johann Heinrich Bösenselle. Among the most notable rectors are the founder of modern Moravian historiography Josef Vratislav Monse or Slovenian philosopher Franz Samuel Karpe. In 1950, Palacký University became the first Czech university to have a female Rector – Jiřina Popelová. The current rector is Professor Martin Procházka. He has appointed eight vice-rectors.

=== Scholarly Board ===
The Scholarly Board consists of notable representatives in the fields in which the university executes educational, scientific, research, artistic or other creative activity. It is chaired by the university rector. No more than two-thirds of the board members can be members of the university's academical community. The Scholarly Board discusses the university's long-term objectives. It approves study programmes (unless such approval falls under the authority of a faculty Scholarly Board) and it also participates in the process of assigning a professor title.

In 2021, the board had 29 internal and 17 external members.

=== Disciplinary Commission ===
The members of the University Disciplinary Commission (as well as the chairman) are appointed by the rector (subject to Senate approval) to serve for two years. Half the members are students. Because all Palacký University students are enrolled into their respective faculties, there is no need for a central University Disciplinary Commission, but there are Disciplinary Commissions at each faculty (the members being appointed by a dean, subject to Faculty Senate approval). The Disciplinary Commissions handle disciplinary misdemeanours of the students and they propose the verdicts to the respective faculty Dean.

=== Administrative Council ===
The Administrative Council approves some of the university deeds (real estate transactions, establishing other legal personalities for the university, the transfer of money or property between them, and so on) and it gives its opinion on the university budget, long-term University objectives, and so on. Members are appointed by the Minister of Education (after discussion with the rector) for a period of six years; one third of the council is appointed every two years. Members represent the general public, municipal and regional authorities as well as state administration. University employees cannot be Council members. Sessions take place at least twice a year. Election of the chairman, vice-chairman and rules of procedure are set by the University Statute

Among the fifteen members of Palacký University Administrative Council are Jan Březina MEP, Archbishop of Olomouc Jan Graubner, and Olomouc Region Governor Martin Tesařík.

=== Bursar ===
The bursar is responsible for the management and administration of the university and also represents the university to the extent determined by the rector, who appoints and revokes the bursar.

=== Other bodies ===
- University Chancellor
- Rector's Advisory Board
- Internal Assessment Board
- Editorial Committee
- Ethical Commission
- Pedagogical Committee
- Quality Committee

=== Faculty governance ===
The faculties are parts of the university. Only the university as a whole is a legal personality. Nevertheless, the internal affairs of faculties are run by their respective self-governing bodies, which have similar rules and functions as those at the university level. Each faculty therefore has a faculty senate (also with students' and lecturers' curia), which among other things nominates the Dean (appointed by the rector). As mentioned before, disciplinary misdemeanours are tried by the faculty disciplinary commissions, while issues concerning study programmes are dealt with by the faculty scientific boards. Each faculty has a secretary instead of a bursar.

== Notable people ==
=== Staff ===
- Valentin Stansel (1621–1705) – mathematician, astronomer
- Johann Jahoda (1623–1676) – humanist
- Bartholomäus Christel (1624–1701) – professor of aesthetic
- Melchior Hanel (1627–1689) – linguist, philosopher, theologian
- Johann Dilat (1638–1698) – historian
- Franz Kamperger (1628–1689) – theologian
- Adam Adamandy Kochański (1631–1700) – Polish mathematician
- Ferdinand Waldhauser (1641–1681) – philosopher, theologian
- Jakub Kresa (1648–1715) – mathematician (dubbed "Euclid of the West")
- Karel Ferdinand Irmler (1650–?) – professor of law (1679 – 1691)
- Josef Dalbert (1683–?) – historian
- Kryštof Josef Hollandt (?–1713) – author of commentary on the Institutes of Justinian
- Johann From (1685–1739) –
- Johann Hillebrandt (1686–1761) – philosopher, theologian
- Johann Schmidt (1693–1762) – historian
- Ignaz Popp (1697–1765) – historian
- Josef Wach (1711–1777) – jurist
- Tadeáš Polanský (1713–1770) – scientist (physics), theologian
- Jan Tesánek (1728–1788) – author of scientific literature, mathematician
- Johann Heinrich Bösenselle (?–1767) – first secular rector
- Josef Vratislav Monse (1733–1793) – leading person of Enlightenment in Habsburg monarchy
- Franz Samuel Karpe (1747–1806) – Slovene philosopher
- Vincenz Augustus Wagner – author of Austrian Negotiable instrument law
- Johann Nepomuk Rust (1775–1840) – physician and military Surgeon General
- Andreas von Baumgartner (1775–1840) – physicist and Austrian statesman
- Friedrich Franz (1796–1860) – daguerreotyper, influenced Mendel
- Alois Vojtěch Šembera (1807–1882) – very important figure of the Czech National Revival
- Adalbert Theodor Michel (1821–1877) – professor of private law
- Anton Gindely (1829–1892) – historian
- Pavel Trost (1907–1987) – linguist
- Miroslav Komárek (1924–2013) – linguist
- Aljo Beran (1907–1990) – painter, author of the Palacký University emblem
- Milič Čapek (1909–1997) – philosopher
- Emil Holas (1917–1985) – psychologist
- Jiří Levý (1926–1967) – literary historian and translation theoretician
- Vladislav David (b. 1927) – leading Czech jurist in international public law
- Antonín Procházka (1927–2006) – Justice of the Constitutional Court of the Czech Republic
- Heinrich Pompeÿ (b. 1936) – German theologist, psychologist,
- František Mezihorák (b. 1937) – historian, Senator
- Nina Škottová (b. 1946) – pharmacologist, politician, Member of the European Parliament
- Eliška Wagnerová(b. 1948) – Justice of the Constitutional Court of the Czech Republic
- Stanislav Balík (b. 1956) – Justice of the Constitutional Court of the Czech Republic

=== Alumni ===
- Saint John Sarkander (1576–1620) – Polish Roman Catholic martyr
- Saint John Ogilvie (1579–1615) – a Scottish Roman Catholic Jesuit martyr
- Albrecht von Wallenstein (1583–1634) – supreme commander of the armies of the Habsburg monarchy, major figure of Thirty Years' War (matriculated 1605)
- Wenceslas Pantaleon Kirwitzer (1588–1626) – an astronomer and a Jesuit missionary
- Stanisław Zaremba (?–1648) – Polish writer, Roman Catholic Bishop of Kiev
- Johannes Marcus Marci (1595–1667) – philosopher, scientist
- Bohuslav Balbín (1621–1688) – writer, historian
- Francis Taaffe, 3rd Earl of Carlingford (1639–1704) – army commander, politician
- Varlaam Yasinsky (?–1707) – rector of Kiev College, Metropolitan of Kiev, Galicia and Russia
- Lev Zalenskyj (c1648–1708) – Metropolitan of Kiev, Galicia and Russia
- Franz Retz (1673–1750) – fifteenth Superior General of the Society of Jesus
- Jan Talentius – mathematician, author of Gemmula mathematica sive ars liberatis etc., Bregae
- Karel Slavíček (1678–1735) – the first Czech sinologist, author of the first precise map of Beijing
- Joseph Leopold Freiherr von Petrasch (1714–1772) – founder of the first learned society in the Habsburg monarchy, the Societas eruditorum incognitorum
- Johann Rudolf Kutschker (1750–1816) – Cardinal, Archbishop of Vienna
- Raphael Georg Kiesewetter (1773–1850) – music historian
- Johann Jahn (1750–1816) – orientalist
- Pavel Vranický (1756–1808) – Moravian classical composer
- Johann Karl Nestler (1783–1841) – agronomist, early researcher of genetics
- František Jan Mošner (1797–1876) – professor of Obstetrics, head of the Olomouc nursery and orphanage, promoter of innovative approaches in Olomouc healthcare education
- Gregor Johann Mendel (1802–1884) – "The Father of Genetics"
- Peter Ritter von Rittinger (1811–1872) – inventor of the heat pump
- Beda Dudík (1815–1890) – historian
- Rudolf Eitelberger von Edelberg (1817–1885) – art historian
- Pavel Křížkovský (1820–1885) – choral composer and conductor
- Eduard Schön (1825–1879) – composer
- Anton Gindely (1829–1892) – historian
- Jan Šrámek (1870–1952) – priest, longtime leader of the Czechoslovak People's Party
- František Dvorník (1893–1975) – Byzantinist and Slavist, professor of Byzantinology at Harvard University
- Alois Musil (1868–1944) – theologist, orientalist, ethnographer, explorer and writer
- Saint Gorazd (1879–1942) – hierarch and martyr of the Czech and Slovak Orthodox Church
- František Tomášek (1899–1992) – theologian, cardinal of the Roman Catholic Church, the 34th Archbishop of Prague
- Jiří Opelík (born 1930) – literary critic, historian
- Vladimír Palička (b. 1946) – biochemist and endocrinologist, dean of the Charles University Faculty of Medicine in Hradec Králové
- Jindřich Štreit (b. 1946) – photographer and pedagogue known for his documentary photography
- Lumír Ondřej Hanuš (b. 1947) – leading cannabis researcher
- Emil Viklický (b. 1948) – jazz pianist and composer
- Jan Švec – inventor of Videokymography
- Ivan Langer (b. 1957) – politician, member of Student Strike Committee in 1989, Minister of Interior 2006 – 2009 (1987 – 1993 Faculty of Medicine, 1993 – 1996 Faculty of Law)
- Jaroslava Maxová (b. 1957) – mezzo-soprano opera singer
- Jan Balabán (1961–2010) – writer, existentialist
- Tomáš Zatloukal (b. 1969) – politician, Member of European Parliament (2004–2009)
- Bohdan Pomahač (b. 1971) – performed the first full face transplant in the US in 2011
- Rezgar Sivejlí Rashid (?-2016) – Peshmerga Brigadier General KIA in war against ISIS (alumnus of Faculty of Medicine)

== See also ==
- List of early modern universities in Europe
- List of Jesuit sites
