= List of Charles University rectors =

This is a list of rectors of the University of Prague founded in 1347/1348 by Emperor Charles IV (the current official name is Charles University).

== University of Prague ==
- 1366 Henricus de Etwat de Primislawia (Jindřich z Etwatu neboli z Embecku)
- 1367 Henricus de Nanexen alias de Embeck (Jindřich z Nanexen neboli z Embecku)
- 1372 Nicolaus Gewiczka seu de Kolberg (Mikuláš z Jevíčka neboli z Kolobřehu). In 1372, the Faculty of Law became an independent university.

=== 1372–1419 University of 3 faculties ===
- 1373 Thomas de Busilia (Tomáš z Busilie)
- 1374 Johannes Westphalis (Jan Vestfálský) Johannes Wenceslai de Praga (Jenek Václavův z Prahy)
- 1375 Vigtholdus Westphalis de Praga (Witold Vestfálský z Prahy)
- 1376–1377 Fridmanus de Praga (Fridman z Prahy)
- 1378 Nicolaus de Gubin (Mikuláš z Gubyna), Hermannus de Wintersvick (Heřman z Winterswicku), Nicolaus Raconik (Mikuláš z Rakovníka)
- 1382 Jenco de Praga (Johannes Wenceslai de Praga Jenek Václavův z Prahy)
- 1383 Blasius Lupus (Blažej Vlk)
- 1383–1384 Johannes Wenceslai de Praga (Jenek Václavův z Prahy), Heylmannus de Wormacia (Heilman z Wormsu) Johannes Papendorp (Jan Papendorf)
- 1384–1385 Conradus Soltow (Konrád ze Soltau)
- 1385 Nicolaus de Gubin (Mikuláš z Gubyna)
- 1386 Nicolaus de Litomysl (Mikuláš z Litomyšle)
- 1387 Nicolaus de Gubin (Mikuláš z Gubyna)
- 1388–1389 Johannes Winkleri (Jan Winkler)
- 1389 Bartholomeus Torghelowe (Bartoloměj Torghelow)
- 1389–1390 Nicolaus Bochnik (Mikuláš Bochnik)
- 1391–1392 Henricus de Bremis (Jindřich z Brém)
- 1392 Henricus Reczekow de Rybenicze (Jindřich Reček z Rybenice)
- 1392–1393 Albertus Engelschalk de Straubinga (Albert Engelschalk ze Straubingu)
- 1393 Johannes Eliae (Jan Eliášův)
- 1393–1394 Elias de Thin (Eliáš z Týna)
- 1394 Henricus de Homberg (Jindřich z Homburgu)
- 1394 Johannes de Moravia (Jan z Moravy)
- 1394–1395 Petrus de Redino (Petr z Redina)
- 1395–1396 Johannes de Mutha (Jan z Mýta)
- 1396–1397 Henricus de Perching (Jindřich z Perchingu)
- 1397 Nicolaus Magni de Jawor (Mikuláš Magni z Jawora)
- 1397–1398 Stephanus de Colonia seu Colinensis (Štěpán z Kolína neboli Kolínský)
- 1398 Johannes Ottonis de Monsterberg (Jan Otův ze Ziebice)
- 1398–1399 Helmoldus de Soltwedel (Helmold ze Soltwedelu)
- 1400 Stephanus de Palecz (Štěpán z Pálče)
- 1401 Nicolaus Stor de Swydnicz (Mikuláš Stor ze Svídnice)
- 1402–1403 Nicolaus de Lutomyssl (Mikuláš z Litomyšle)
- 1403 Walterus Harrasser (Walter Harraser)
- 1404 Stanislaus de Znoyma (Stanislav ze Znojma)
- 1404–1405 Johannes de Pustimir (Jan z Pustiměře)
- 1405 Christianus de Prachaticz (Křišťan z Prachatic)
- 1405–1407 Clemens de Mnichovicz (Kliment z Mnichovic)
- 1407 Andreas de Broda (Ondřej z Brodu)
- 1407–1408 Bernhardus de Granovicz (Bernard z Granovice)
- 1408 Clemens de Mnichov (Kliment z Mnichovic)
- 1408 Zdenko de Labun (Zdeněk z Labouně), Marcus de Grecz (Marek z Hradce Králové)
- 1408–1409 Henningus de Baltenhagen (Henning z Baltenhagenu)
- 1409 Zdenko de Labun (Zdeněk z Labouně)
- 1409–1410 Johannes Hus (Jan Hus), Johannes Hoffmanus Swidnicensis (Jan Hofman ze Svídnice)
- 1410 Johannes Andreae (Jan Ondřejův řečený Šindel)
- 1410–1411 Jacobus de Sobieslavia (Jakub Matějův ze Soběslavi), Gregorius de Praga (Jiří z Prahy), Johannes de Jessenicz (Jan z Jesenice), Gallus de Utery (Havel z Úterého)
- 1411 Simon de Tisnov (Šimon z Tišnova)
- 1412 Marcus de Grecz (Marek z Hradce Králové)
- 1412–1413 Christianus de Prachaticz (Křišťan z Prachatic)
- 1413 Michael de Malenicz (Michal z Malenic)
- 1413–1414 Antonius de Luna (Antonín z Loun)
- 1414 Gallus de Utery (Havel z Úterého), Briccius de Buda (Brikcius z Budína)
- 1415 Briccius de Buda (Brikcius z Budína)
- 1415–1416 Thomas de Lissa (Tomáš z Lysé) Simon de Rokiczana (Šimon z Rokycan)
- 1416 Jacobus de Sobieslavia (Jakub ze Soběslavi)
- 1416–1417 Johannes Cardinalis von Bergreichenstein (Jan Kardinál z Rejnštejna)
- 1418 Zdislaus de Zwirzeticz (Zdislav ze Zvířetic)

=== 1372–1419 Independent Law School ===
- 1372–1373 Johannes de Pernstein (Jan z Pernštejna); Gerhardus Visbeke de Osenbrughe (Gerhard Wisbeck z Osnabrücku) was a vicecektor
- 1373–1375 Pertholdus de Wehingen (Berthold z Wehingenu)
- 1375–1376 Johannes de Hohenloch (Jan z Hohenlohe), Eglolfus Hornbech – vicerektor (Eglolf Hornbeck)
- 1376–1377 Gorlacus Horst de Stargardia (Gerlach Horst ze Stargardu)
- 1377–1378 Johannes Slepekow (Jan Slepekow)
- 1378–1379 Henricus de Stwolenca (Jindřich ze Stvolenky)
- 1379–1380 Henricus de Stwolenca (Jindřich ze Stvolenky)
- 1380–1381 Nicolaus de Kossczol (Mikuláš z Kosczola) Johannes Saxo de Zirberch – vicerektor (Jan Saxo ze Zirbergu) Nicolaus Wenceslai dictus Geunher de Praga – vicerektor (Mikuláš Václavův řečený Geunher z Prahy)
- 1381–1382 Nicolaus Geunheri de Praga (Mikuláš Geunher z Prahy)
- 1382–1383 Carolus Haguini (Karel Haguin)
- 1383–1384 Georgius de Hohenloch (Jiří z Hohenlohe)
- 1384–1385 Nicolaus Geunheri de Praga (Mikuláš Geunher z Prahy)
- 1385–1386 Ulricus Medek de Schellemberg (Oldřich Medek ze Šelemberku)
- 1386–1387 Mathias Kule (Matyáš Kule)
- 1387–1388 Smylo de Wyncow (Jodocus Smylo de Kunstat Smil z Kunštátu)
- 1388–1389 Nicolaus Geunheri de Praga (Mikuláš Geunher z Prahy)
- 1389–1390 Jaroslaus de Porzessin (Jaroslav z Pořešína)
- 1390–1391 Nicolaus Erghemes de Livonia (Mikuláš Erghemes z Livonska)
- 1391–1392 Cristanus Aroldishusen (Kryštof z Freiburgu)
- 1392–1393 Petrus Cappleri de Sulewicz (Petr Kaplíř ze Sulevic)
- 1393–1394 Jodocus Hecht de Rossicz (Jošt Hecht z Rosic)
- 1394 Johannes de Brun (Jan z Brunnu)
- 1394–1395 Johannes Czeghenryd de Sundis (Jan Zeghenried ze Stralsundu)
- 1395–1396 Czenko de Labun (Čeněk z Labouně)
- 1396–1397 Lucas Hezler de Legnicz (Lukáš Hezler z Lehnice)
- 1397–1398 Petrus Slewynk (Petr Slewynk)
- 1398–1399 Nicolaus Geunheri (Mikuláš Geunher z Prahy)
- 1399–1400 Nicolaus Geunheri (Mikuláš Geunher z Prahy)
- 1400–1401 Stephanus de Manicz (Štěpán z Manic)
- 1401 Mroczko de Kiszelewo dictus Nagorka (Mroczko z Kiszelewa řečený Nagorka), Nicolaus Geunheri – vicerektor (Mikuláš Geunher z Prahy)
- 1401–1402 Nicolaus Geunheri (Mikuláš Geunher z Prahy)
- 1402–1403 Heuke de Konyad (Hewko z Konyad)
- 1403–1404 Nicolaus Geunheri (Mikuláš Geunher z Prahy)
- 1404–1405 Johannes Pauli (Jan Paulův)
- 1405–1406 Bernhardus Bulowe de Glyn (Bernhard Bulow z Glynu)
- 1406–1407 Andreas Gerechini (Ondřej Gerechin)
- 1407–1408 Ulricus de Glowaczow (Matyáš z Glowaczowa)
- 1408–1409 Ulricus de Strassicz (Oldřich ze Strašic)
- 1409–1410 Ulricus de Strassitz (Oldřich ze Strašic)
- 1410–1411 Mathias de Trutenow (Matyáš z Trutenowa)
- 1411–1412 Henricus Rolle (Jindřich Rolle)
- 1412–1413 Conradus Wertheim (Konrád Wertheim)
- 1413–1415 Mathias Rost de Praga (Matyáš Rost z Prahy)
- 1415–1416 Arnestus de Metelsko (Arnošt z Metelska)
- 1416–1418 Ulricus de Strassitz (Oldřich ze Strašic)
- 1418–1419 Nicolaus Henrici de Praga (Mikuláš Jindřichův z Prahy)

=== 1419–1622 Utraquist Academy (Carolinum) ===
- 1420 Martinus Cunssonis de Praga (Martin Kunšův z Prahy)
- 1420–1421 Procopius de Plzna (Prokop z Plzně)
- 1425 Petrus de Sepekov (Petr ze Sepekova)
- 1425–1426 Johannes Borotin (Jan z Borotína)
- 1426 Procopius de Plzna (Prokop z Plzně)
- 1434 Christianus de Prachaticz (Křištan z Prachatic)
- 1435 John of Rokycan
- 1437 Christianus de Prachaticz (Křištan z Prachatic)
- 1438–1439 Petrus de Mladoniovicz (Petr z Mladoňovic)
- 1439–1440 Wenceslaus de Prachaticz (Václav z Prachatic)
- 1440–1441 Augustinus de Glatovia (Augustin z Klatov)
- 1442–1443 Petrus de Grecz (Petr z Hradce Králové)
- 1443–1444 Procopius de Plzna (Prokop z Plzně)
- 1444 Wenceslaus de Prachaticz (Václav z Prachatic)
- 1445 Johannes de Sobieslavia (Jan ze Soběslavi)
- 1447–1448 Mauricius de Benessow (Mařík z Benešova)
- 1449–1450 Petrus de Grecz (Petr z Hradce Králové)
- 1450–1451 Johannes de Czaslaw (Jan z Čáslavi)
- 1453–1454 Wenceslaus de Prachaticz (Václav z Prachatic)
- 1455–1456 Martinus de Lancicia (Martin z Lančic)
- 1456–1457 Stanislaus de Welwar (Stanislav z Velvar)
- 1457–1458 Johannes de Jemnicz (Jan z Jemnice)
- 1459–1460 Wenceslaus de Wrben (Václav z Vrbna)
- 1460–1462 Johannes de Praga (Jan z Prahy)
- 1462–1463 Wenceslaus Coranda de Plzna (Václav Koranda z Plzně)
- 1463–1464 Johannes de Czaslaw (Jan z Čáslavi)
- 1464–1465 Paulus de Dobrin (Pavel z Dobřína)
- 1466–1467 Wenceslaus de Wrben (Václav z Vrbna)
- 1467–1469 Johannes de Praga (Jan z Prahy)
- 1470–1471 Wenceslaus Coranda de Plzna (Václav Koranda z Plzně)
- 1471–1472 Jacobus de Patzau (Jakub z Pacova)
- 1474–1475 Johannes de Tabor (Jan z Tábora)
- 1476–1477 Gregorius Pragensis (Řehoř z Prahy)
- 1477–1479 Laurencius de Rokycan (Vavřinec z Rokycan)
- 1480–1481 Wenceslaus de Trzepsko (Václav z Třebska)
- 1483–1484 Jacobus de Patzau (Jakub z Pacova)
- 1484–1485 Paulus de Zaacz (Pavel ze Žatce)
- 1487–1488 Johannes Pragensis (Jan z Prahy)
- 1492–1493 Paulus de Zaacz (Pavel ze Žatce)
- 1494–1496 Jacobus de Strziebro Strziebrensis (Jakub ze Stříbra)
- 1496–1497 Paulus de Zaacz (Pavel ze Žatce)
- 1498–1499 Martinus de Wlassim (Martin z Vlašimi)
- 1499–1500 Wenceslaus de Pacow (Václav z Pacova)
- 1502–1503 Georgius Kaurzimensis (Jiří z Kouřimi)
- 1504–1505 Jacobus Pacowiensis (Jakub z Pacova)
- 1505 Wenceslaus de Pacow (Václav z Pacova)
- 1508–1509 Michael de Straz (Michal ze Stráže)
- 1509–1510 Wenceslaus de Pacow (Václav z Pacova)
- 1511–1512 Wenceslaus Candidus (Václav Candidus)
- 1512–1513 Wenceslaus de Pacow (Václav z Pacova)
- 1513 Wenceslaus Coranda de Plzna (Václav Koranda z Plzně)
- 1514–1515 Wenceslaus Letomyslius (Václav z Litomyšle)
- 1515–1516 Duchco Brodensius (Duchek z Brodu)
- 1516–1517 Wenceslaus Letomyslius (Václav z Litomyšle)
- 1517–1519 Laurentius Trebonius (Vavřinec z Třeboně)
- 1519–1521 Wenceslaus Letomyslius (Václav z Litomyšle)
- 1521–1522 Johannes Presticenus (Jan z Přeštic)
- 1522–1523 Wenceslaus Letomyslius (Václav z Litomyšle), prorector Johannes Presticenus (Jan z Přeštic)
- 1524–1525 Johannes Presticenus (Jan z Přeštic)
- 1525–1526 Thomas Wlassymensis (Tomáš z Vlašimi)
- 1526–1527 Mathias Chorambius (Matyáš Koramba)
- 1527–1528 Thomas Rakonus (Tomáš Rakovnický)
- 1528–1530 Johannes Presticenus (Jan z Přeštic)
- 1530–1531 Laurentius Trebonius (Vavřinec z Třeboně)
- 1531–1532 Johannes Presticenus de Jaworzicz (Jan Přeštický z Javořice)
- 1532–1533 Georgius Piesensis (Jiří Písecký)
- 1533–1535 Johannes Chocenus (Jan Choceňský)
- 1535–1536 Georgius Pisensis (Jiří Písecký)
- 1537–1538 Johannes Hortensius Pragensis (Jan Zahrádka z Prahy)
- 1538–1539 Martinus Glatovinus Bethlemiticus (Martin Klatovský z Betléma)
- 1539–1540 Johannes Hortensius Pragensis (Jan Zahrádka z Prahy)
- 1540–1541 Georgius Pisensis (Jiří Písecký)
- 1541–1542 Martinus Glatovinus Bethlemiticus (Martin Klatovský z Betléma)
- 1542–1545 Henricus Curius de Helfenberg (Jindřich Dvorský z Helfenberka)
- 1545–1546 Johannes Hortensius Prahenus (Jan Zahrádka z Prahy)
- 1546–1548 Gregorius Orinus de Chocemicz (Řehoř Orinus z Chocemic)
- 1548–1551 Johannes Hortensius Prahenus (Jan Zahrádka z Prahy)
- 1551–1553 Sebastianus Aerichalcus Praesticenus (Šebestián Aerichalcus z Přeštic)

- 1553–1557 Johannes Hortensius Pragenus (Jan Zahrádka z Prahy)
- 1557–1559 Johannes Colonius (Jan Kolínský)
- 1559–1561 Mathias Dapsilius Curius ab Hajek (Matyáš Dvorský z Hájku)
- 1561–1562 Georgius Polenta a Sudetis (Jiří Polenta ze Sudetu)
- 1562–1572 Mathias Curius ab Hajek (Matyáš Dvorský z Hájku)
- 1572–1573 Petrus Codicillus de Tulechowa (Petr Kodicill z Tulechova)
- 1573–1582 Mathias Curius ab Hajek (Matyáš Dvorský z Hájku)
- 1582–1589 Petrus Codicillus de Tulechow (Petr Kodicill z Tulechova)
- 1589–1591 Marcus Bydzovinus a Florentino (Marek Bydžovský z Florentýna)
- 1591–1593 Trojanus Nigellus de Osskorzina (Trojan Nigellus z Oskořína)
- 1593–1594 Adamus Zaluzanius de Zaluzan (Adam Zalužanský ze Zalužan)
- 1594–1597 Marcus Bydžovinus a Florentino (Marek Bydžovský z Florentýna)
- 1597–1599 Trojanus Nigellus de Osskorzina (Trojan Nigellus z Oskořína)
- 1599–1600 Martinus Bachaczii de Naumierzicz (Martin Bacháček z Nauměřic)
- 1600–1602 Johannes Adam Bystrziczenus (Jan Adam z Bystřice)
- 1602–1603 Marcus Bydžovinus a Florentino (Marek Bydžovský z Florentýna)
- 1603–1612 Martinus Bachacius de Naumierzicz (Martin Bacháček z Nauměřic)
- 1612 Johannes Campanus Wodnianus (Jan Kampanus Vodňanský)
- 1612–1613 Adamus Huber de Risenpach (Adam Huber z Riesenbachu)
- 1613–1614 Julius Schlick (Julius Šlik)
- 1614–1615 Johannes Albrechtus Krzinetius de Ronow (Jan Albrecht Křinecký z Ronova)
- 1615–1616 Johannes Abraham a Gerstorf (Jan Abraham z Gersdorfu)
- 1616–1617 Johannes Christophorus a Fiinfkirchen (Jan Kryštof z Pětikostelí)
- 1617 Stephanus Strelius de Rencer (Štěpán Střela z Rokyc)
- 1617–1620 Jan Jesenius
- 1620–1621 Carolus Hilprand de Walterskirchen (Karel Hilprandt z Walterskirchenu), Johannes Campanus Wodnianus – prorektor (Jan Kampanus Vodňanský)
- 1621 Johannes Campanus Wodnianus (Jan Kampanus Vodňanský)
- 1621–1622 Nicolaus Troilus Hagiochoranus (Mikuláš Troilus Hagiochoranus)

=== 1556–1654 Jesuit Ferdinand's Academy (Clementinum) ===
- 1556–1558 Ursmarus Goisonius (Ursmar de Goisson)
- 1558–1561 Paulus Hoffaeus (Pavel Hoffae)
- 1561–1574 Henricus Blissemius (Jindřich Blyssem)
- 1574–1580 Joannes Paulus Campanus (Jan Pavel Campani)
- 1582–1589 Alexander Voit (Alexander Voit) – 1580 vicerektor 1581 prorector
- 1589–1590 Joannes Reinelius (Jan Reinel)
- 1590–1591 Paulus Neukirchius (Pavel Neukirche)
- 1591–1592 Alexander Voit (Alexander Voit)
- 1593–1595 Wenceslaus Sturmius (Václav Šturm)
- 1595–1601 Melchiorus Trevinnius (Melchior Trevino)
- 1601–1606 Jacobus Geranus (Jakub Geranus)
- 1606–1610 Theophilus Christecus (Theofyl Krystecki Krysztek)
- 1610–1616 Jacobus Geranus (Jakub Geranus)

=== 1622–1638 Common rectors of Carolinum and Clementinum ===
- 1622–1623 Valentinus Coronius (Valentin Koruna)
- 1623–1626 Petr Jimenéz (Ximenius)
- 1626–1629 Martin Santinus
- 1629–1638 Martin Středa (Stedonius)

=== 1638–1654 Jesuit Ferdinand's University (Clementinum) ===
In 1638–1654, Carolinum had no rector.

- 1638–1639 Jiří Meridies
- 1639–1643 Blažej Slanina
- 1643–1646 Pavel Anastasius
- 1646–1650 Ondřej du Buisson
- 1650–1652 Jiří Molitoris
- 1652–1653 Jiří Hogenegger (1616–1684), vice-rector
- 1653–1654 Jan Molitoris

== 1654–1881 Charles-Ferdinand University ==
In 1654 both universities were unified.

- 1654 Jan Molitoris
- 1655 Jindřich Pipius
- 1655 Mikuláš Franchimont z Franckensfeldu
- 1655–1659 Ondřej Schambogen
- 1660 Kryštof Norbert Knauth z Fahnenschwungu
- 1661 Jan z Vrbna
- 1662 Jan Marcus Marci z Kronlandu
- 1663 Jan z Vrbna
- 1664 Kryštof Kyblín z Waffenburku
- 1665 Jan Saxius
- 1666 Mikuláš Franchimont z Franckenfeldu
- 1667 Václav Zímmerman
- 1668 Ignác František Tam
- 1669 Šimon Schürer
- 1670–1671 Jakub Jan Václav Dobřenský de Nigro Ponte
- 1672 Daniel Krupský
- 1673 Jan Jiří Funck
- 1674 Matyáš Tanner
- 1675–1676 Jan Jiří Proxa
- 1677 Řehoř Král
- 1678 Matyáš Alois Malanotte
- 1679 Jiří Weis
- 1680–1681 Šebestián Kristián Zeidler z Zeidlernu
- 1682 Jan Wald
- 1683 Jan Jiří Funck
- 1684 František z Vrtby
- 1685–1686 Jakub Jan Václav Dobřenský de Nigro Ponte
- 1687 Emanuel de Boye
- 1688 Jan Kryštof Schambogen
- 1689 Václav Sattenwolf
- 1690 Jan Jindřich Proxa
- 1691 Václav Sattenwolf
- 1692 Jan Kryštof Schambogen
- 1693 Ondřej Muntzer
- 1694 Jan Antonín Cassinis de Bugella
- 1695 Jan Dubský
- 1696–1697 Jan Jindřich Turba
- 1698 Ferdinand Rudolf Waldhauser
- 1699 Jan František Löw z Erlsfeldu
- 1700 Kašpar Knittel
- 1701 Jan Jindřich Turba
- 1702 Tomáš Schmidl
- 1703 Jan František Löw z Erlsfeldu
- 1704 Jáchym Stechau
- 1705 Jan Kašpar Ignác Wolwert de Neffe
- 1706 Jiří Kinský (Chsinsky)
- 1707 Jan Kašpar Ignác Voigt
- 1708 Jan Miller
- 1709–1710 Václav Jan z Kriegelsteinu
- 1711 Jan Miller
- 1712 Jan Frantíšek Löw z Erlsfeldu
- 1713 Jakub Stessl
- 1714–1715 Václav Xaver Neumann z Puchholtze
- 1716 František Fragstein
- 1717 Jan František Lbw z Erlsfeldu
- 1718–1719 Heřman Oppersdorf
- 1720 Jan Adam Besnecker
- 1721 Jakub Stessl
- 1722 Leonard Ferdinand Meisner
- 1723 Franz Retz
- 1724 Václav Xaver Neumann z Puchholtze
- 1725–1726 Jan Nonnert
- 1727 Ferdinand Leonard Meisner
- 1728 Jan Seidel
- 1729 Václav Xaver Neumann z Puchholtze
- 1730–1731 Julius Zwicker
- 1732 Ferdinand Leonard Meisner
- 1733 Jan Seidel
- 1734 Václav Xaver Neumann z Puchholtze
- 1735 Jan Seidel
- 1736 Jan Jakub Gelhausen vicerektor Václav Xaver
- 1737 Václav Xaver Neumann z Puchholtze
- 1738 Jan Heilman
- 1739–1740 Václav Xaver Neumann z Puchholtze
- 1741–1742 Jiří Peter
- 1744 Jakub Smith z Balroe
- 1745 František Xaver Heissler
- 1746 Jindřich Petr Proichhausen
- 1747 Leopold Grimm
- 1748 Antonín Václav Rings
- 1749 Leopold Grimm
- 1750 Mikuláš Ignác Knigsmann
- 1751 Bernard Weber
- 1752 Jan Ignác Mayer z Mayersbachu
- 1753 Bernard Weber
- 1754 Josef Azzoni
- 1755–1756 Baltazar Lindner
- 1757 Jan Antonín Scrinci
- 1758 Jan Tille
- 1759 Jan Nepomuk Václav Dvořák z Boru
- 1760 Jan Tille; from 17 June 1760 Jan Antonín Scrinci
- 1761 Jan Antonín Scrinci
- 1762 Jan Matyáš Schweiberer
- 1763–1674 Ignác Kajetán Veit
- 1765–1676 František Xaver Wissinger
- 1767 František Du Toy
- 1768 Jáchym Pleiner
- 1769 František Václav Štěpán z Kronefelsu
- 1770–1771 Petr Janovka
- 1772–1773 František Wissinger (He died on 29 July, 1772 in Rome, the last Jesuit rector)
- 1774 František Václav Stephan
- 1775–1776 Pavel Seddeler
- 1777 František Du Toy
- 1778 Antonín František Veselý
- 1779 Ferdinand Woldřich
- 1780–1781 Tomáš Jan Hrdlička
- 1782 Leonard Antonín Verbeck
- 1783–1784 Karel Jindřich Seibt
- 1785 Josef Antonín Schuster
- 1786 Cosmas Schmalfus
- 1787 Tadeáš Bayer
- 1788 Jan Diesbach
- 1789 Ferdinand Woldřich
- 1790 Karel Rafael Ungar
- 1791 Václav Vojtěch Forsat
- 1892 Jan Diesbach
- 1793 Josef z Bretfeldu
- 1794 Jiljí Chládek
- 1795 Jan Křitel Zauschner
- 1796 Antonín Strnad
- 1797 Josef z Bretfeldu
- 1798 Kašpar Royko
- 1799 Josef Bohumír Mikan
- 1800 Stanislav Vydra
- 1801 Jan Nepomuk Vignet
- 1802 Vavřinec Chrysostomus Rogner
- 1803 Antonín Michelič
- 1804 Jan Goskho ze Sachsenthalu
- 1805 Josef z Bretfeldu
- 1806 František Xaver Hain
- 1807 Ignác Matuschka
- 1808 Václev Lenhart
- 1809 Josef z Bretfeldu
- 1810 Karel František Fischer
- 1811 Josef Rottenberger
- 1812 Milo Jan Nepomuk Grün
- 1813 Josef z Bretfeldu na Kronenburgu
- 1814–1815 František Pitroff
- 1816 Alois Martin David
- 1817 Josef z Bretfeldu na Kronenburgu
- 1818 Karel František Fischer
- 1819 Josef Rottenberger
- 1820 František Mikuláš Titze
- 1821 Michael Schuster
- 1822 František Seraf Wilhelm
- 1823 Ignác Nádherný
- 1824 Josef Antonín Köhler
- 1825 Martin Adolf Kopetz
- 1826 Benedikt Jan Nepomuk Eiffer
- 1827 Jan Theobald Held
- 1828 Josef Ladislav Jandera
- 1829 Jan Kaňka
- 1830 František Tippmann
- 1831 Julius Vincenz von Krombholz
- 1832 Franz Ignatz Cassian Hallaschka (František Ignác Kassián Halaška)
- 1833 Tomáš Karel Härdtl
- 1834 Maxmilián Millauer
- 1835 František Wünsch
- 1836 Josef Leonard Knoll
- 1837 Karel Václav Wolfram
- 1838 Václav Vilém Václavíček
- 1839 Antonín Jan Jungmann
- 1840 Josef Jungmann
- 1841 Antonín Karel Mudroch
- 1842 Mikuláš Tomek
- 1843 Jan Nepomuk Fischer
- 1844 Jeroným Josef Zeidler
- 1845 Leopold Hasner von Artha
- 1846 Jeroným Josef Zeidler
- 1847–1848 Josef Reisich
- 1849 Josef Hoffmeister
- 1850 František Serafin Češík
- 1850–1851 Matyáš Popel
- 1851–1852 Vincenc František Kostelecký
- 1852–1853 Jiří Norbert Schnabel
- 1853–1854 Jan Nep. Ignác Rotter
- 1854–1855 Franz von Pitha
- 1855–1856 Jeroným Josef Teidler
- 1856–1857 Jan Chlupp
- 1857–1858 Gabriel Güntner
- 1858–1859 Anton von Jaksch
- 1859–1860 August Emanuel von Reuss
- 1860–1861 František Eduard Tuna
- 1861–1862 Jan Křitel Smutek
- 1862–1863 Josef von Löschner
- 1863–1864 Jan Jindřich Löwe
- 1864–1865 František Xaver Schneider
- 1865–1866 Vincenc Náhlovský
- 1866–1867 Josef Halla
- 1867–1868 Vincenc František
- 1868–1869 Jan Bedřich Schulte
- 1869–1870 Eduard Petr
- 1870–1871 Emanuel Seidl
- 1871–1872 Konstantin von Höfler
- 1872–1873 Jan Nepomuk Schier
- 1873–1874 František Antonín Mayer
- 1874–1875 Joseph Hasner
- 1875–1876 Samuel Friedrich Stein
- 1876–1877 Karl von Czyhlarz
- 1877–1878 Antonín Reinwarth
- 1878–1879 Jan Streng
- 1879–1880 Ernst Mach
- 1880–1881 Huga Kremer–Auenrode
- 1881–1882 Josef Schindler

=== 1882–1939 Czech University ===
- 1882–1883 Václav Vladivoj Tomek
- 1883–1884 Antonín Randa
- 1884–1885 Jan Streng
- 1885–1886 Václav Tomek
- 1886–1887 Emil Ott
- 1888–1889 František Studnička
- 1889–1890 Matouš Talíř
- 1890–1891 Vladimír Tomsa
- 1891–1892 Antonín Frič
- 1892–1893 Jiří Pražák
- 1893–1894 Frantšek X. Kryštůfek
- 1894–1895 Arnold Spina
- 1895–1896 Karel Vrba
- 1896–1897 Jaromír Hanel
- 1897–1898 Eugen Kadeřávek
- 1898–1899 Josef Reinsberg
- 1889–1900 Jan Gebauer
- 1900–1901 Josef Strupecký
- 1901–1902 Jan Ladislav Sýkora
- 1902–1903 Ivan Horbaczewski
- 1903–1904 Čeněk Strouhal
- 1904–1905 František Stroch
- 1905–1906 Antonín Vřešťál
- 1906–1907 Jaroslav Hlava
- 1907–1908 Lubor Niederle
- 1908–1909 Leopold Heyrovský
- 1909–1910 Josef Král
- 1910–1911 Jan Jánošík
- 1911–1912 Jaromír Čelákovský
- 1912–1913 František Vejdovský
- 1913–1914 František Mareš
- 1914–1915 Kamil Henner
- 1915–1916 Rudolf Dvořák
- 1916–1917 Vítězslav Janovský
- 1917–1918 Gabriel Pecháček
- 1918–1919 Karel Hermann–Otavský
- 1919–1920 Josef Zubatý
- 1920–1921 František Mareš
- 1921–1922 Bohumil Němec
- 1922–1923 Cyril Horáček
- 1923–1924 František Pastrnek
- 1924–1925 Otakar Kukula
- 1925–1926 Karel Petr
- 1926–1927 Josef Vančura
- 1927–1928 Lubor Niederle
- 1928–1929 Vladimír Slavík
- 1929–1930 Jindřich Matiegka
- 1930–1931 August Miřička
- 1931–1932 Josef Pekař
- 1932–1933 Rudolf Kimla
- 1933–1934 Karel Domin
- 1934–1935 Josef Drachovský
- 1935–1936 Gustav Friedrich
- 1936–1937 Karel Weigner
- 1937–1938 František Slavík
- 1938–1939 Vilém Funk
- 1939–1940 Bedřich Hrozný

=== 1882–1945 German University ===
- 1882–1883 Ewald Hering
- 1883–1884 Ernst Mach, replaced by Ferdinand Lippich
- 1884–1885 Friedrich Rulf
- 1885–1886 Wenzel Frind
- 1886–1887 Carl Gussenbauer
- 1887–1888 Moritz Willkomm
- 1888–1889 Dominik Ullmann
- 1889/1890 Josef Sprinzl
- 1890/1891 Philipp Knoll
- 1891/1892 Johann von Kelle
- 1892/1893 Emil Sax
- 1893/1894 Gustav Carl Laube
- 1894/1895 Josef Schindler
- 1895/1896 Karl Hugo Huppert
- 1896/1897 Anton Marty
- 1897/1898 Joseph Ulbrich
- 1898–1899 Anton Kurz
- 1899/1900 Carl Holzinger Ritter von Weidich
- 1900/1901 Hans Chiari
- 1901/1902 Friedrich Freiherr von Wieser
- 1902/1902 Adolf Bachmann
- 1903/1904 Carl Rabl, elected rector Virgil Grimmich died on 13 August 1903
- 1904/1905 Alois Rzach
- 1905/1906 Josef Rieber
- 1906/1907 Emil Pfersche
- 1907/1908 August Sauer
- 1908/1909 Rudolf von Jaksch
- 1909/1910 Josef Zaus
- 1910/1911 Max Grünert
- 1911/1912 Heinrich Rauchberg
- 1912/1913 Robert Lendlmayr Ritter von Lendenfeld, died on 3 June 1913
- 1913/1914 Richard Ritter von Zeynek, 1869–1945
- 1914/1915 Heinrich Swoboda
- 1915/1916 Adolf Zycha
- 1916/1917 Ottokar Weber
- 1917/1918 Anton Elschnig
- 1918–1920 August Naegle
- 1920/1921 Franz Wähner
- 1921/1922 Robert Mayr-Harting
- 1922/1923 Samuel Steinherz
- 1923/1924 Karl Kreibich
- 1924/1925 Josef Jatsch
- 1925/1926 Carl Isidor Cori
- 1926/1927 Otto Peterka
- 1927/1928 Heinrich Rietsch
- 1928/1929 Otto Grosser
- 1929/1930 August Naegle
- 1930/1931 Carl Isidor Cori
- 1931–1933 Mariano San Nicolò
- 1933/1934 Gerhard Gesemann
- 1934/1935 Otto Grosser
- 1935/1936 Karl Hilgenreiner
- 1936/1937 Michael Stark (rector)
- 1937/1938 Rudolf Schránil
- 1938/1939 Ernst Otto
- 1939/1940 Ernst Otto
- 1940–1942 Wilhelm Saure
- 1942/1943 Alfred Buntru
- 1943/1944 Friedrich Klausing
- 1944/1945 Kurt Albrecht

== 1945–present Charles University ==
- 1945–1946 Jan Bělehrádek
- 1946–1947 Bohumil Bydžovský
- 1947–1948 Karel Engliš
- 1948–1954 Jan Mukařovský
- 1954–1958 Miroslav Katětov
- 1958–1966 Jaroslav Procházka (general)
- 1966–1969 Oldřich Starý
- 1969–1970 Josef Charvát
- 1970–1976 Bedřich Švestka
- 1976–1990 Zdeněk Češka
- 1990–1995 Radim Palouš
- 1995–1999 Karel Malý
- 1999–2005 Ivan Wilhelm
- 2005–2014 Václav Hampl
- 2014–2022 Tomáš Zima
- 2022–2026 Milena Králíčková
- 2026–present Jiří Zima
