= Samuel Friedrich Stein =

German entomologist

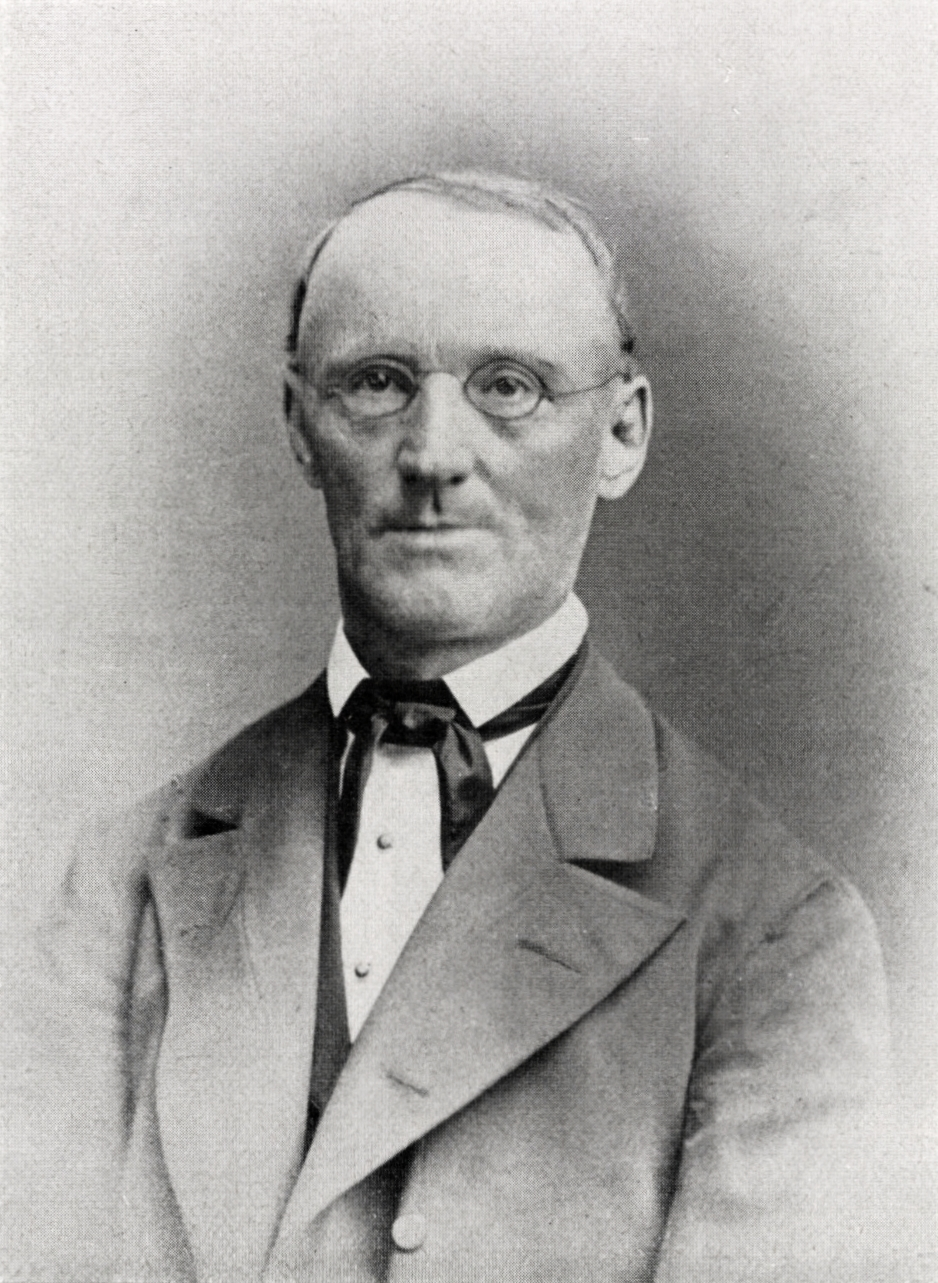
Samuel Friedrich Nathanael (knight von) Stein (1818–1885), German zoologist and entomologist who lived and worked in Prague from 1855. He is one of 72 important personalities whose names are written under the windows of the National Museum in Prague.

Samuel Friedrich Nathaniel Ritter von Stein (November 3, 1818 – January 9, 1885) was a German zoologist who worked in the field of protozoology and entomology. He was Professor at the Royal Saxon Academy of Forestry in Tharandt from 1850–55; and Professor, and later Rector, at the Charles University in Prague, from 1855–76. His scientific work focused mainly on the ciliates (then called infusoria) and he later contributed to studies on some arthropods.

== Life and work ==
Stein was born in Niemegk, near Potsdam, Brandenburg, where his father Karl Wilhelm was a pastor. He went to the local public school and also learned from his father. He aimed to study theology and was sent to high school in Wittenberg where he became interested in natural history, publishing notes in Oken's Isis as a high-school student in the period between 1834 and 1837. This included the description of a new species - Alucita pelidnodactyla (now Stenoptilia) in 1837. His father let him shift to natural sciences due to the interest he showed and he finished his Matura exam and moved to the University of Berlin in 1838. He attended the lectures of Johannes Müller and Arend Friedrich August Wiegmann, receiving support from Hinrich Lichtenstein at the museum as well. He received a doctorate in 1841 with a dissertation “De Myriapodum partibus genitalibus cum 3 tab. aeneis". He worked at the museum until 1843 when he began to teach at the municipal trade school. Here he wrote a book on plant anatomy and also on insects. He received his habilitation at the University of Berlin in 1848. Following the death of Wilhelm Ferdinand Erichson, he was made first custodian at the zoological museum in Berlin in 1849. In 1850 he was appointed as a full professor at the Royal Saxon Academy for Forestry and Agriculture in Tharandt. Here he worked mainly on insects. In 1855 he was invited by Leo Count Thun to the Imperial Austrian civil service and he moved to Charles University in Prague, where he worked until retirement. Among his students was the Archduke Ludwig Salvator. He served as the first Protestant rector Rector of the university in the 1875–76 academic year.

On May 24, 1844, in Berlin, he married Emma Johanne Couard Ottilie (December 30, 1823, Berlin – 2 September 1903, Asch), daughter of Berlin pastor Christian L. Couard. The couple had nine children. The penultimate daughter Adelheid von Stein (born May 25, 1859), married Joseph Neuwirth.

=== Scientific contributions ===
Stein's scientific work from the 1840s to around the 1880s focused on micro-organisms, then termed as infusoria. He questioned some of the findings of Ehrenberg. on invertebrates, particularly the idea that the nuclei and nucleoli were whole organs and that cyst formation was a sign of death. Stein suggested that cystation was a sign of reproduction. Stein's Die Infusionsthiere auf ihre Entwickelungsgeschichte of 1854 was dedicated to Johannes Peter Müller and Karl Theodor Ernst von Siebold. He began to use acetic acid to stain and improve the nucleus and saw varying appearances. He then suggested that vorticellids and acinetids were two stages of the same organisms (the acinetids being embronic stages) in 1854 while most others considered acinetid zoospores as parasites of the vorticellids. Stein would later be proved wrong. He also created a classification of the ciliates based on the distribution of cilia. He described some European isopods, sawflies and neuroptera.

== Honors ==
Stein was made corresponding member of the Imperial Academy of Sciences in 1857. He received a Knight's Cross of the Franz Joseph Order in 1869. In 1877 he was awarded the Order of the Iron Crown III class. He was ennobled on April 27, 1878, in Vienna by Emperor Franz Josef I and also appointed as a government councilor.

== Works ==
- De Myriapodum partibus genitalibus, nova generationis theoria atque introductione systematica adjectis. Dissertatio inauguralis zoologica quam [...] in Alma Universitate Litteraria Friderica-Guilielma [... (16.Aug. 1841) ] publice defendet auctor, Berlin: Brandes et Klewert, 1841 OCLC 819304597
- Die lebenden Schnecken und Muscheln der Umgegend Berlins, Berlin: Reimer, 1850 OCLC 1042989804
- Die Infusionsthiere auf ihre Entwicklungsgeschichte untersucht, Leipzig: Engelmann, 1854 OCLC 898417223
- Der Organismus der Infusionsthiere nach eigenen Forschungen in Systematischer Reihenfolge, Leipzig: Wilhelm Engelmann
  - I. Abtheilung. Allgemeiner theil und Naturgeschichte der Hypotrichen Infusionsthiere, 1859 OCLC 475289589
  - II. Abtheilung. 1) Darstellung der neuesten Forschungsergebnisse über Bau, Fortpflanzung und Entwickelung der Infusionsthiere 2) Naturgeschichte der Heterotrichen Infusorien, 1867 OCLC 469003334
  - III. Abtheilung. Die Naturgeschichte der Flagellaten oder Geisselinfusorien.
    - 1. Hälfte, Den noch nicht Abgeschlossenen allgemeinen Theil nebst Erklärung der sämmtlichen Abbildungen enthaltend, 1878 OCLC 492310978
    - 2. Hälfte, Die Naturgeschichte der arthrodelen Flagellaten, 1883 OCLC 756275227
- Über die Hauptergebnisse der Infusorienforschungen. Ein Vortrag, Vienna: Staatsdruckerei, 1863 OCLC 162277404

Educational offices
Preceded by Joseph Hasner	Rector of Charles University in Prague; 1875–1876	Succeeded by Karl von Czyhlarz
