= Corethropsis =

Scientific classification
- Kingdom: Fungi
- Division: Ascomycota
- Class: incertae sedis
- Genus: Corethropsis; Corda, 1839

Species
- Corethropsis australis Speg., 1882; Corethropsis brasiliensis (Sacc.) Mussat, 1901; Corethropsis elegans Speg., 1896; Corethropsis epimyces Massee, 1885; Corethropsis hominis Vuill., 1934; Corethropsis hominis var. hominis Vuill., 1934; Corethropsis hominis var. sphaeroconidica Cif. & E. Bald., 1938; Corethropsis paradoxa Corda, 1839 (type); Corethropsis pulchra Sacc., 1877; Corethropsis pulchra var. brasiliensis Sacc., 1886; Corethropsis pulchra var. pulchra Sacc., 1877; Corethropsis puntonii Vuill., 1930

Genus of fungi

Corethropsis is a genus of fungi of uncertain affinity within the division Ascomycota.
