= August Carl Joseph Corda =

Czech botanist and mycologist

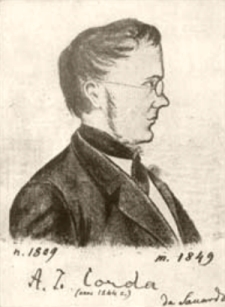
- Born: 15 November 1809; Liberec, Bohemia, Austrian Empire
- Died: September 1849 (aged 39)
- Occupations: Botanist, mycologist

August Carl Joseph Corda (15 November 1809 – September 1849) was a Czech botanist and mycologist. He is considered the founder of Czech scientific illustration. This botanist is denoted by the author abbreviation Corda when citing a botanical name.

== Early life and education ==
Corda was born in Reichenberg, Bohemia (now Liberec, Czech Republic), on 15 November 1809. Corda's father was a textile seller. Both of Corda's parents died suddenly only a few weeks following his birth, and Corda was raised by his grandmother, attending the Normale School in Reichenberg. Corda's grandmother died in 1819 and Corda was sent to live with an "unacquainted family" for two years during which time he did not receive schooling. Two years later, Corda was transferred to the care of an uncle in Prague where he attended the "Lyceum of New Prague". As a result of family difficulties, Corda left the Lyceum in 1824 to attend polytechnical school. There, he studied physics under Franz Ignatz Cassian Hallaschka, chemistry under Josef Johann Steinmann, mineralogy under Franz Xaver Zippe, and botany under Ignaz Friedrich Tausch. Corda remained at the Polytechnic only 3 years, long enough to become proficient in chemistry.

After leaving the Polytechnic in 1827, Corda took a job in a chemical factory in Prague for a brief time before returning to study surgery at the University of Prague. Shortly thereafter during an outbreak of Vibrio cholerae, Corda served as an assistant surgeon at the General Hospital in Prague. He continued as a cholera doctor in Rokitzan, Reichstadt, Niemes and Zwickau. Late in 1832, dispirited by his seemingly endless struggle against cholera, Corda quit the practice of medicine.

== Botanical career ==
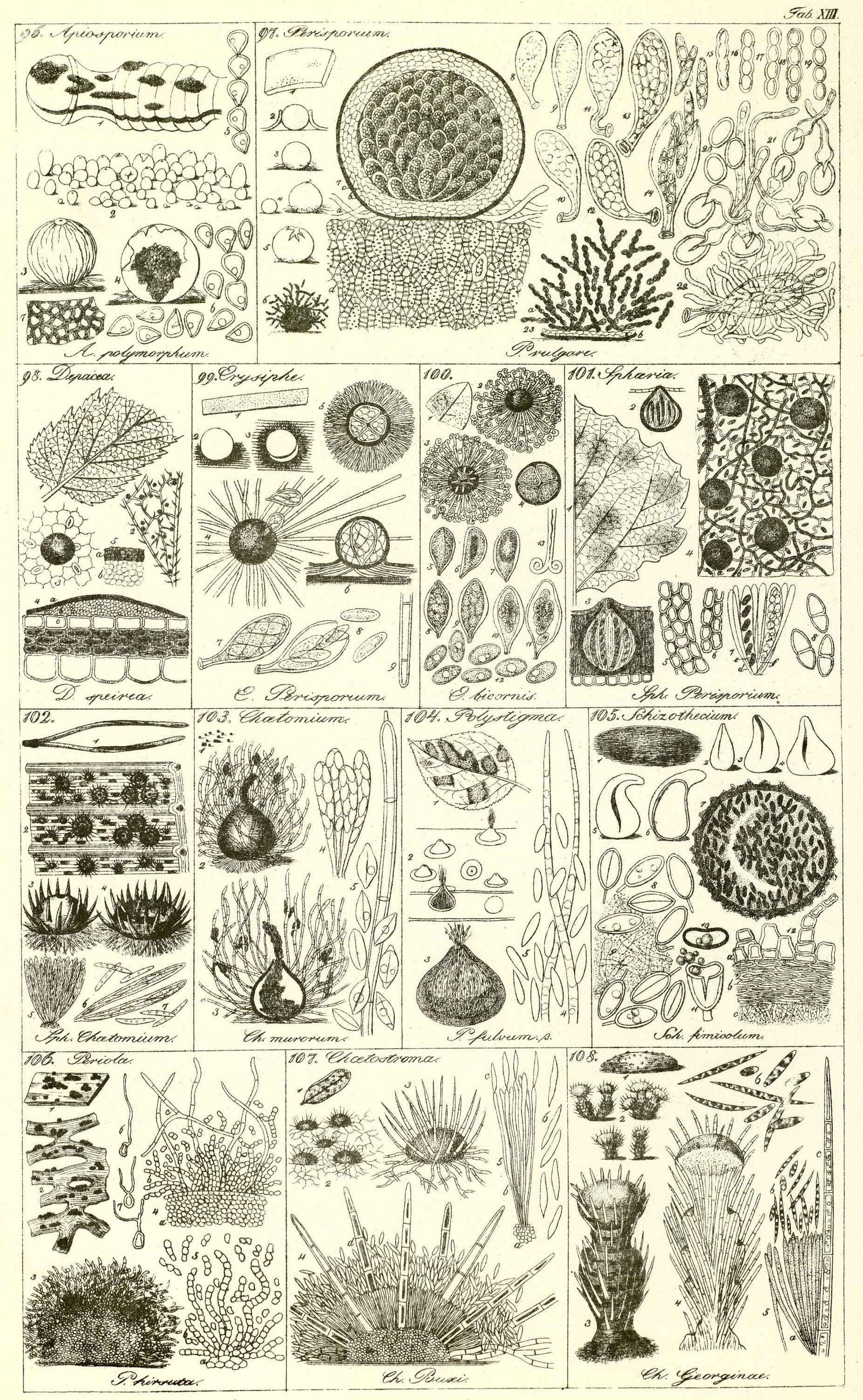
Illustrations from Icones fungorum

For six weeks, Corda retreated to Berlin to enjoy the company of his close friend Kurt Sprengel and his many associates in the literati, Alexander von Humboldt, Carl Sigismund Kunth, Johann Horkel and Martin Lichtenstein. Following his return to Reichenberg, Corda was inspired to the study of botany following the receipt of a letter from the Berlin Academy proposing a study of the growth of palms and related plants with a travel grant for a return trip to Berlin. Corda enthusiastically responded by writing De incremento stipitis plantarum with nearly 100 accompanying illustrations which he completed in 1834 along with a monograph on the "Anatomy of the Rhyzosperms". During his return to Prague, Corda collected at the Karlovy Vary Hot Springs where he studied aquatic zooplankton and visited Nees von Esenbeck.

Once back in Prague, Corda was invited to take up a position of Curator of the Division of Zoology at the Czech National Museum by the museum's founder and president, the influential Kaspar Maria von Sternberg, whom Corda had met during his time at Karlovy Vary and also at a botanical congress in Breslau. Corda's primary interest quickly drifted to the mycological collections which became the primary focus of his work. Corda is best known for his monumental 6 volume Icones fungorum hucusque cognitorum, published from 1837 to 1842 and finally in 1854, and his Prachtflora europäischer Schimmelbildungen published in 1839. Corda was one of the first mycologists to document the sizes of spores of the fungi he described.

In 1848, Corda was suspected of political agitation during the Prague Barricades and narrowly escaped assassination. Corda remains well known to mycologists, having described many important fungal genera, including Stachybotrys. He perished at sea in 1849 while returning home from a collecting trip in Texas.

In 1851, he was honoured by the naming of Cordana, a genus of ascomycetous fungi.
