= Budišov nad Budišovkou =

- Town
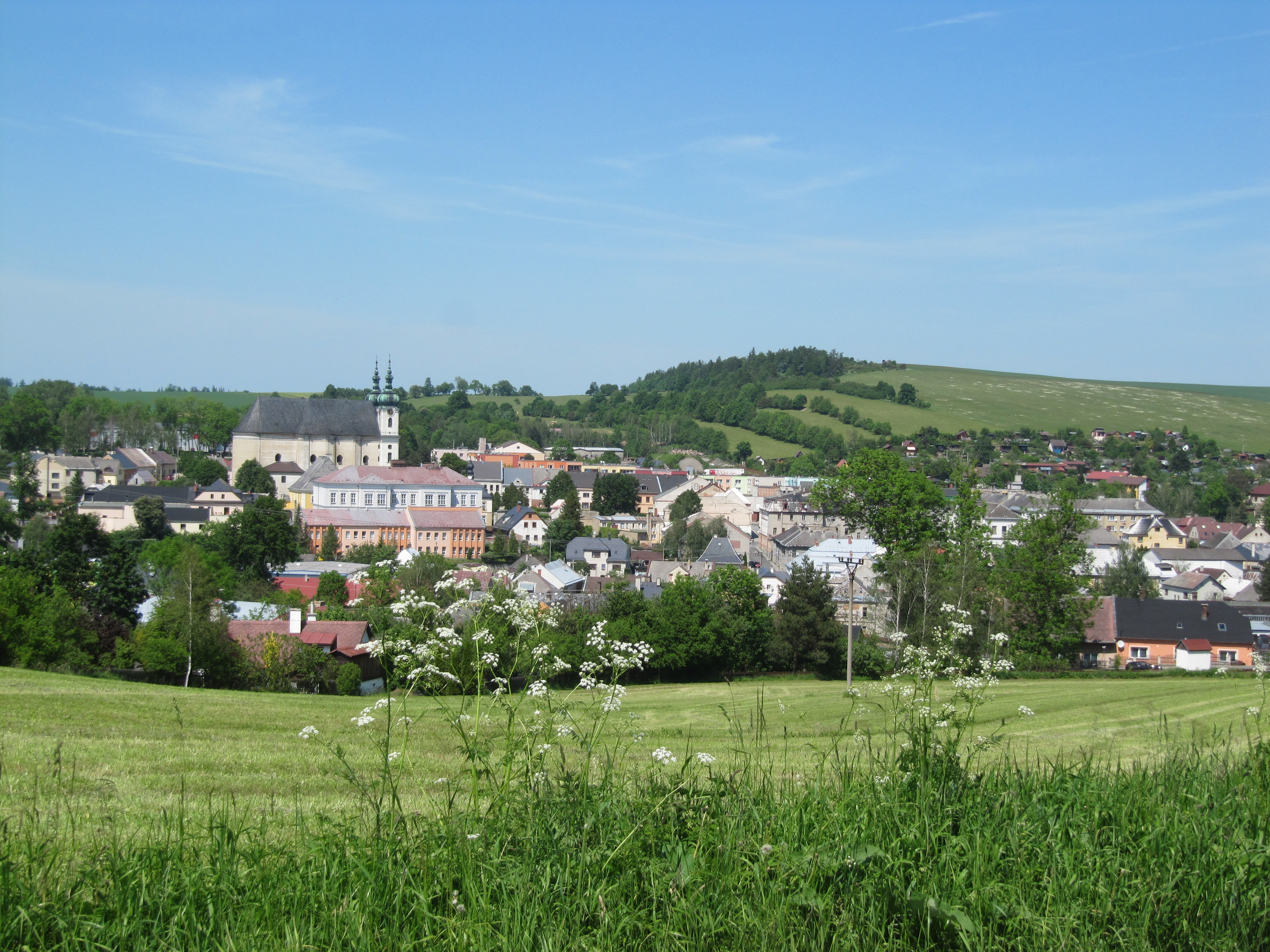
- View from the south

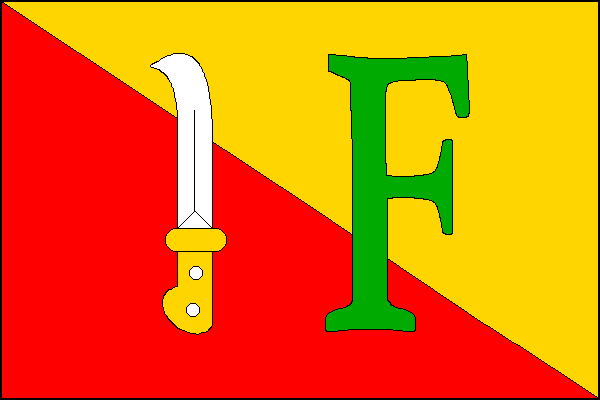
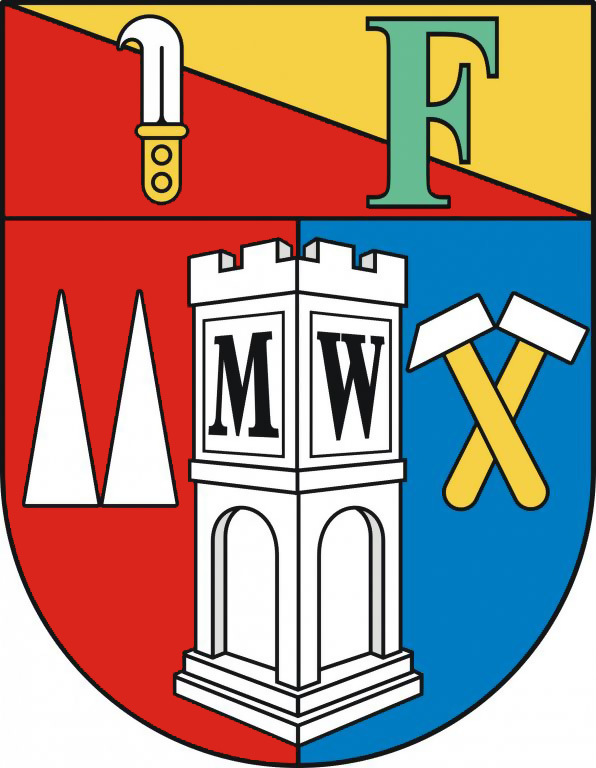
- Flag Coat of arms

- Location in the Czech Republic
- Coordinates: 49°47′42″N 17°37′47″E
- Country: Czech Republic
- Region: Moravian-Silesian
- District: Opava
- First mentioned: 1301

Government
  - Mayor: Patrik Schramm

Area
  - Total: 79.15 km^{2} (30.56 sq mi)
- Elevation: 526 m (1,726 ft)

Population (2026-01-01)
  - Total: 2,787
  - Density: 35.21/km^{2} (91.20/sq mi)
- Time zone: UTC+1 (CET)
  - Summer (DST): UTC+2 (CEST)
- Postal code: 747 87
- Website: www.budisov.eu

Budišov nad Budišovkou (Czech pronunciation: [ˈbuɟɪʃov ˈnad buɟɪʃofkou]; German: Bautsch) is a town in Opava District in the Moravian-Silesian Region of the Czech Republic. It has about 2,800 inhabitants. The town is located on the Budišovka Stream in the Nízký Jeseník range.

Budišov nad Budišovkou was founded as a mining settlement next to silver and lead mines. Since the 18th century, it has been known for slate mining. The historic town centre is well preserved and is protected as an urban monument zone. The main landmark is the Church of the Assumption of the Virgin Mary.

== Administrative division ==
Budišov nad Budišovkou consists of four municipal parts (in brackets population according to the 2021 census):

- Budišov nad Budišovkou (2,407)
- Guntramovice (145)
- Podlesí (78)
- Staré Oldřůvky (190)

== Etymology ==
The name Budišov is derived either from the name of the abbot of the Hradisko Monastery named Budiš or from the old Czech word búda ("miner's house").

== Geography ==
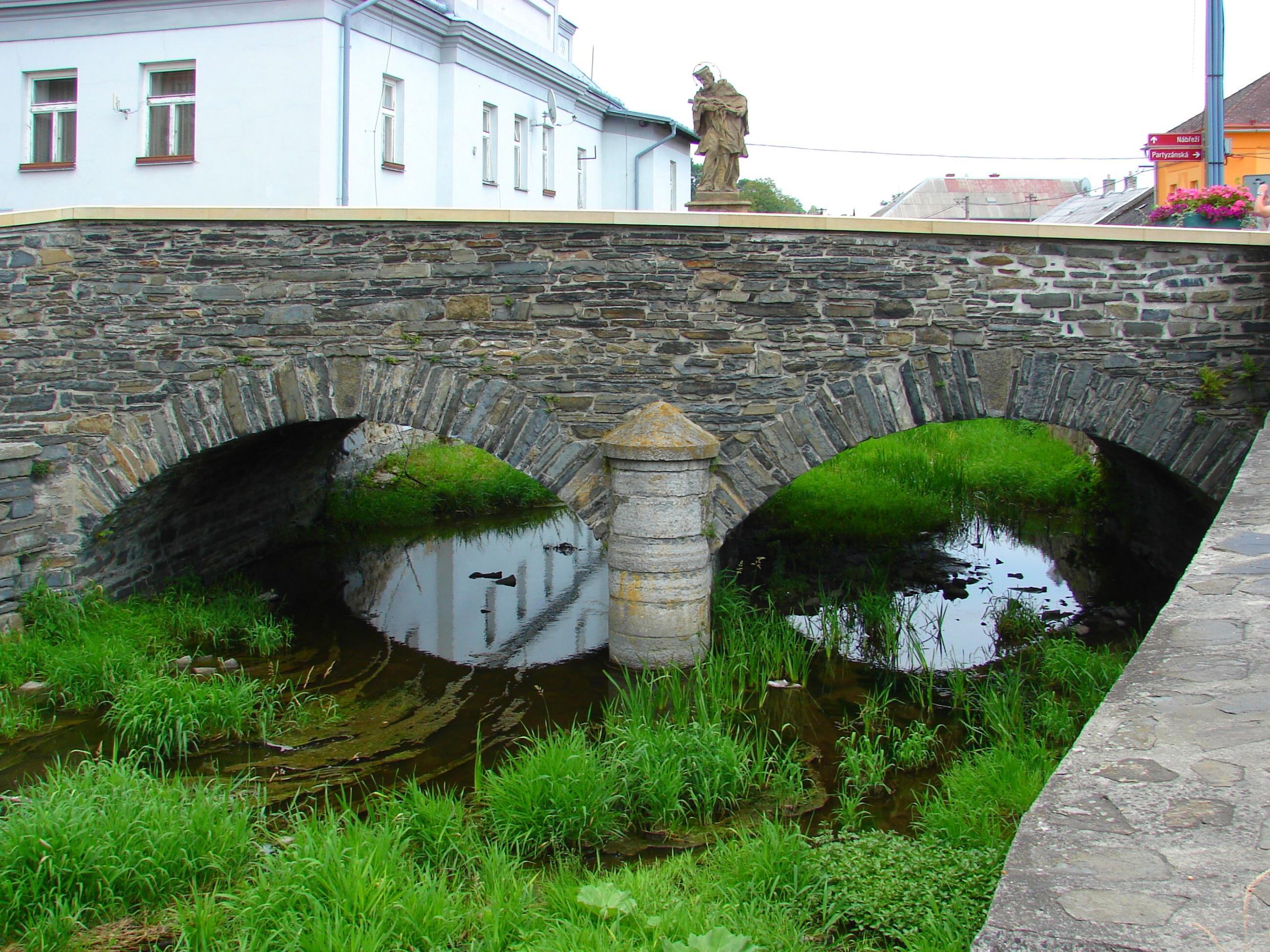
Stone bridge over the Budišovka Stream

Budišov nad Budišovkou is located about 24 kilometres (15 mi) southwest from Opava and 43 km (27 mi) west of Ostrava. It lies in the Nízký Jeseník range. The highest point is the mountain Červená hora at 749 m (2,457 ft) above sea level. The town is situated on the Budišovka Stream. Kružberk Reservoir on the Moravice River lies on the northern border of the municipal territory.

On the mountain of Červená hora is a weather station called Červená. It was established in 1952 and is one of the most remote weather stations in the country. Originally it was created for the needs of the Libavá Military Training Area.

== History ==
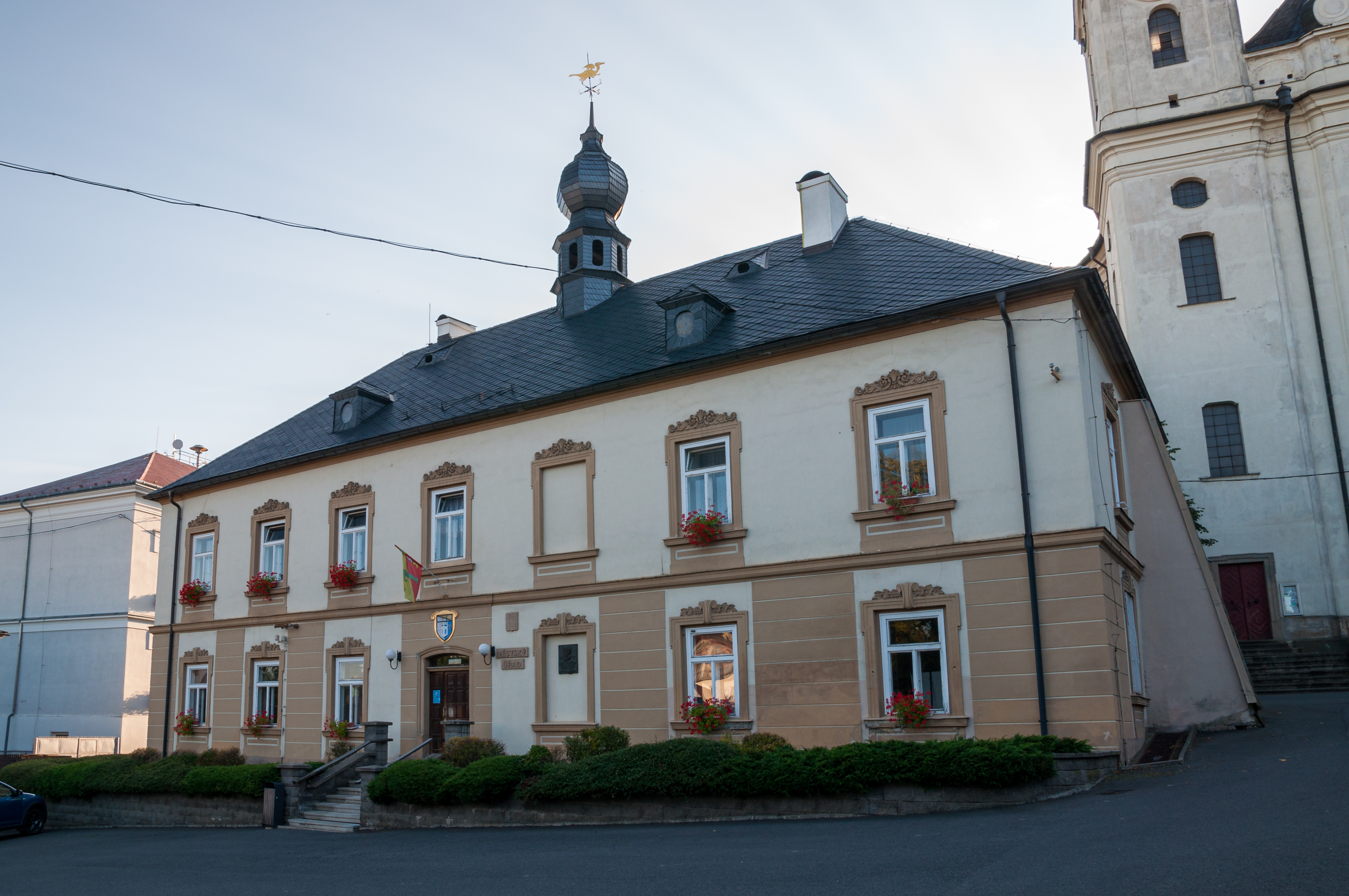
Town hall

The first written mention of Budišov nad Budišovkou is from 1301, but a forest on the site of the settlement was mentioned already in 1239. The settlement was originally founded as a mining community next to silver and lead mines in 13th century and soon became a town. Budišov was owned by the bishops of Olomouc and during their rule in the 16th century, the greatest prosperity of the town has taken place. Trade and crafts were developed.

The prosperity ended with the Thirty Years' War, during which the town was almost destroyed and repeatedly looted. It was then severely damaged during the Seven Years' War by marching troops. Budišov became impoverished and began to suffer from its remoteness and distance from all the main roads. The town had to be financially assisted by the government around 1870. In 1876, a tobacco factory was opened here, which employed 1,000 people at the beginning of the 20th century. In 1891, the railway was opened.

In 1938, after the Munich Agreement, it was annexed by Nazi Germany and administered as part of the Reichsgau Sudetenland, one of the 6 towns of County Bärn. The German-speaking population, which formed to majority of the town's population, was expelled in 1945 according to the Beneš decrees The town was resettled by Czech families.

== Demographics ==
Historical population

Year	Pop.	±%
1869	5,911	—
1880	6,562	+11.0%
1890	6,905	+5.2%
1900	6,882	−0.3%
1910	7,253	+5.4%

Year	Pop.	±%
1921	6,974	−3.8%
1930	6,738	−3.4%
1950	3,306	−50.9%
1961	3,457	+4.6%
1970	3,430	−0.8%

Year	Pop.	±%
1980	3,513	+2.4%
1991	3,340	−4.9%
2001	3,233	−3.2%
2011	2,938	−9.1%
2021	2,820	−4.0%

Source: Censuses

== Economy ==
Budišov nad Budišovkou is known for slate mining. It has been mined here since the 18th century. There are several former mines and one active mine, reopened in 2015. It is the only open underground mine in the Czech Republic.

== Transport ==
Budišov nad Budišovkou is the terminus of a railway line of local importance heading from Suchdol nad Odrou.

== Sights ==
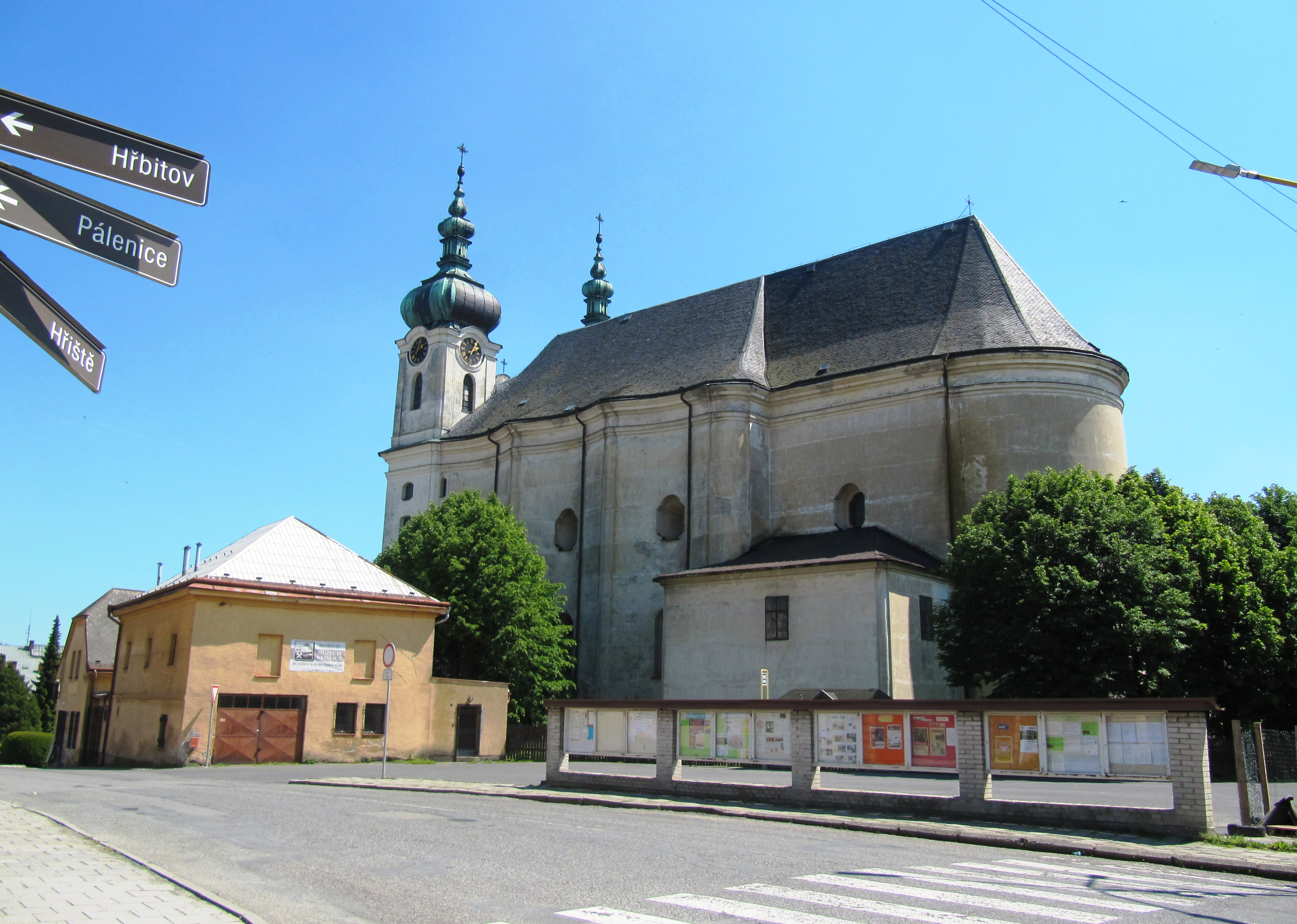
Church of the Assumption of the Virgin Mary

The Church of the Assumption of the Virgin Mary was built in the late Baroque style in 1745–1755. The interior includes a late Gothic statue of the Madonna and Child from around 1500.

A notable monument is the Baroque stone bridge with a statue of Saint John of Nepomuk. Next to the bridge is a water mill, which houses the Slate Museum.

== Notable people ==
- Franz Ignatz Cassian Hallaschka (1780–1847), physicist, rector of Charles University
- Ernst Kuntscher (1899–1971), German politician
- Oskar Schnirch (1902–1995), Austrian cinematographer

== Twin towns – sister cities ==
Budišov nad Budišovkou is twinned with:

- Głubczyce County, Poland
- Mszana, Poland
- Stráňavy, Slovakia
