= Palouš =

Palouš (feminine: Paloušová) is a Czech surname. Notable people with the surname include:

- Jan Palouš (1888–1971), Czechoslovak ice hockey player
- Martin Palouš (born 1950), Czech diplomat
- Radim Palouš (1924–2015), Czech dissident
