= Corethropsis elegans =

Scientific classification
- Domain: Eukaryota
- Kingdom: Fungi
- Division: Ascomycota
- Class: incertae sedis
- Genus: Corethropsis
- Species: C. elegans

Binomial name
- Corethropsis elegans Speg. (1896)

Species of fungus

Corethropsis elegans is a species of fungus of uncertain affinity within the division Ascomycota. It was described as associated with the sugarcane in Argentina.
