= Radim Palouš =

Czech philosopher, educator and spokesman for Charter 77 (1924–2015)

504th Rector of Charles University in Prague
- In office 1 February 1990 – 31 January 1994
- Preceded by: Zdeněk Češka
- Succeeded by: Karel Malý

Personal details
- Born: 6 November 1924 Prague, Czechoslovakia
- Died: 10 September 2015 (aged 90) Prague, Czech Republic

Radim Palouš (6 November 1924 – 10 September 2015) was a Czech dissident, philosopher, educator, and former spokesman for Charter 77, and from 1990 to 1994, was the rector of Charles University in Prague.

== Life ==
Palouš was born into a family of journalists and active athletes. After graduating in Prague, he was placed in forced labor during World War II. From 1945 onwards, he studied philosophy at Charles University, and in 1948 he defended his doctoral thesis (supervised by Jan Patočka) on Masaryks philosophy of youth. He worked as a teacher and studied chemistry at the pedagogical branch in Charles University, where, since 1957, he worked as an assistant. He was qualified in the field of education (Labour School of the modern age), and dealt with the work of Comenius and on modern teaching techniques. His contributions enriched the philosophy of education in Czechoslovakia.

In 1976, he signed Charter 77, and from 1982 to 1983 he was its spokesman. Since 1989 until his death, he was a member of the Masaryk Democratic Movement. In November 1989, as one of the representatives of the Civic Forum, he participated in meetings and negotiations during the Velvet Revolution to release Czechoslovakia from its Communist rule. In January 1990, he became the rector of Charles University. He participated in the restoration of the reform of higher education and to restore international relations with the United Kingdom. Throughout his times, he traveled and lectured in Europe, the Americas, Africa and Asia and received nine honorary doctorates (eight at foreign universities and one in the Czech Republic). For his work in publishing writings on Patočka, he was awarded the Prize of Czechoslovak Academy of Sciences, and most notably, for his lifelong work, the third class of the Order of Tomáš Garrigue Masaryk in 1997.

On 10 September 2015, Radim Palouš died.

== Works ==
- Chemie pro uchazeče o studium na vysokých školách, 2. 1965
- Světověk, 1969, 6. 1990 (německy Das Weltzeitalter, 1993)
- Škola stáří, 1978 (německy 1979)
- K Bolzanovu významu v duchovním vývoji a v národním povědomí, 1981
- Čas výchovy, 1983, 1991
- Česká zkušenost, 1984s, 1994
- Konverze, 1988
- Dopisy kmotřenci 1990
- K filosofii výchovy, 1991
- Komenského Boží svět, 1992
- Osobnost a komunikace, 1990
- Comenius aus Patočka's Sicht, 1993
- Rokování o roku, 1994
- Totalismus a holismus, 1996

== See also ==
- List of Charles University rectors
