= Colin Nichols =

English academic

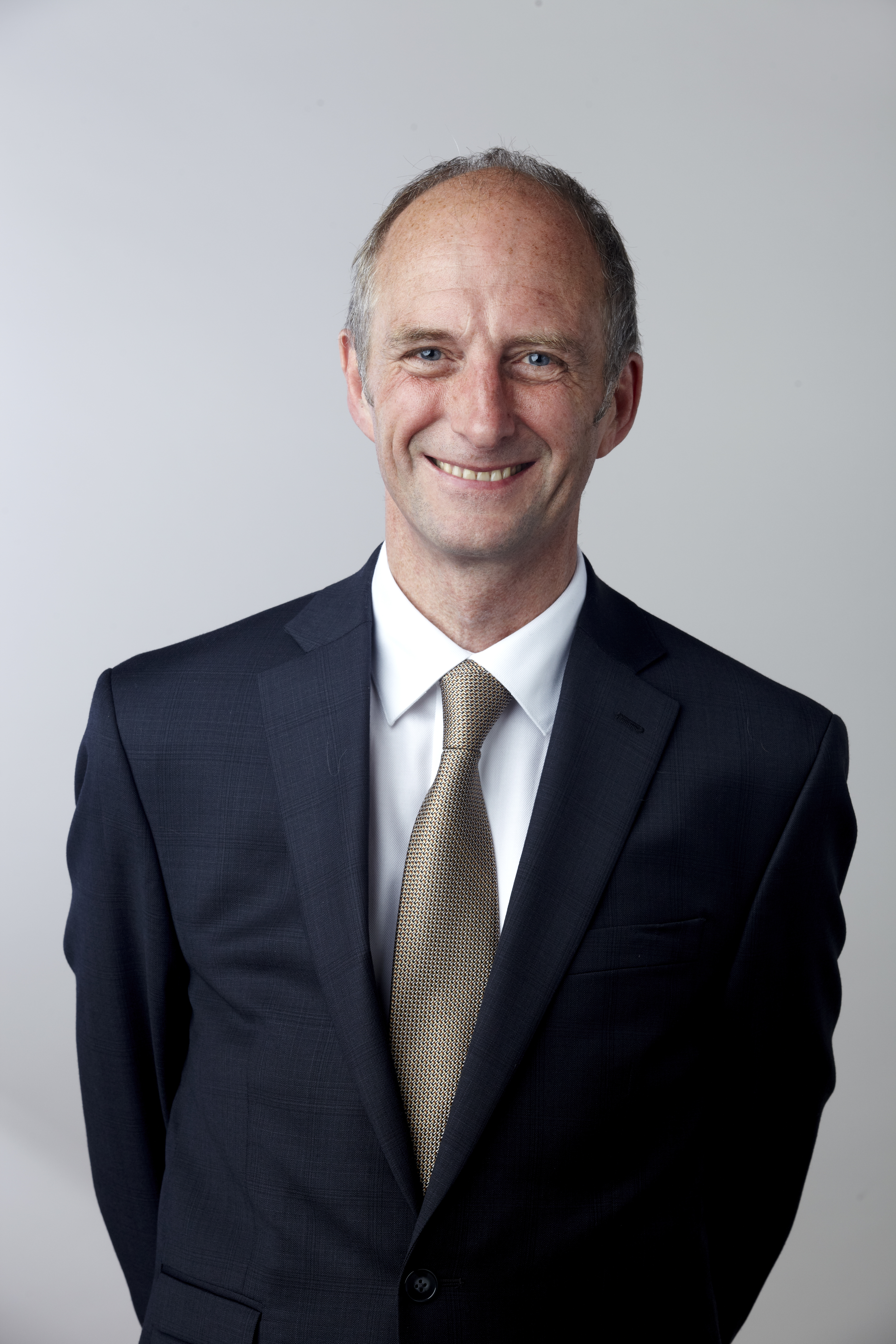
- Colin Nichols in 2014, portrait via the Royal Society
- Born: Colin G. Nichols; Leicester
- Education: University of Leeds (BSc, PhD)
- Known for: ATP-sensitive potassium channels; Inward-rectifier potassium ion channels
- Awards: FRS (2014)
- Scientific career
- Fields: Biology; Medicine
- Workplaces: Washington University in St. Louis; University of Maryland at Baltimore
- Thesis: The effects of changes of length and load on contractility in mammalian myocardium (1985)
- Doctoral advisor: Brian R. Jewell
- Website: nicholslab.wustl.edu

Colin G. Nichols FRS is the Carl Cori Endowed Professor, and Director of the Center for Investigation of Membrane Excitability Diseases at Washington University in St. Louis.

== Education ==
Nichols was educated at the University of Leeds where he was awarded a Bachelor of Science degree in Biochemistry and Physiology in 1982, followed by a PhD in 1985 for research on cardiac muscle in mammals supervised by Brian R. Jewell.

== Career ==
Following his PhD, Nichols completed postdoctoral research at the University of Maryland at Baltimore in the laboratory of W. Jonathan Lederer. He was appointed Assistant Professor at Washington University School of Medicine in 1991 and Full Professor in 2000.

== Research ==
Nichol's research investigates the biology of ion channels, particularly potassium channels, and their role in diabetes mellitus, cardiac dysrhythmias and epilepsy. Nichols uses models to investigate the structure, function and regulation of ion channels, which control what cells do by controlling their electrical polarity.

== Awards and honours ==
Nichols was elected a Fellow of the Royal Society (FRS) in 2014. His nomination reads:

Colin Nichols is distinguished for his contributions to our understanding of cellular excitability and its role in disease. He was instrumental in cloning the first inward rectifier channel and the regulatory subunit of the KATP channel. He elucidated the mechanism of inward rectification, generated new insights into lipid regulation of ion channel function, determined the physiological role of cardiac KATP channels and identified one type of congenital hyperinsulinism. Animal models that he generated predicted the mechanism of human neonatal diabetes, and ultimately helped enable patients to switch from insulin injections to oral drug therapy.
