= Carl Ferdinand Cori =

Austrian-American Nobel prize laureate and scientist (1896–1984)

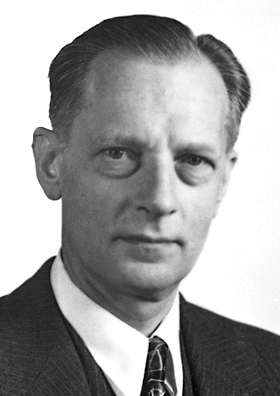
- Carl Cori in 1947
- Born: December 5, 1896; Prague, Austria-Hungary
- Died: October 20, 1984 (aged 87)
- Resting place: Mount Auburn Cemetery
- Citizenship: United States; Austrian-Hungarian
- Education: First Faculty of Medicine, Charles University in Prague
- Known for: Metabolism of carbohydrates
- Spouses: Gerty Radnitz (m. 1920; died 1957) Anne Fitzgerald-Jones (m. 1960)
- Children: 1
- Awards: Albert Lasker Award for Basic Medical Research (1946); Nobel Prize in Physiology or Medicine (1947); Willard Gibbs Award (1948); Austrian Decoration for Science and Art (1959)
- Scientific career
- Fields: Biochemistry • Pharmacology
- Workplaces: State Institute for the Study of Malignant Diseases, Buffalo, New York; Washington University in St. Louis; Harvard Medical School, Boston, Massachusetts
- Website: Nobel Prize Biography

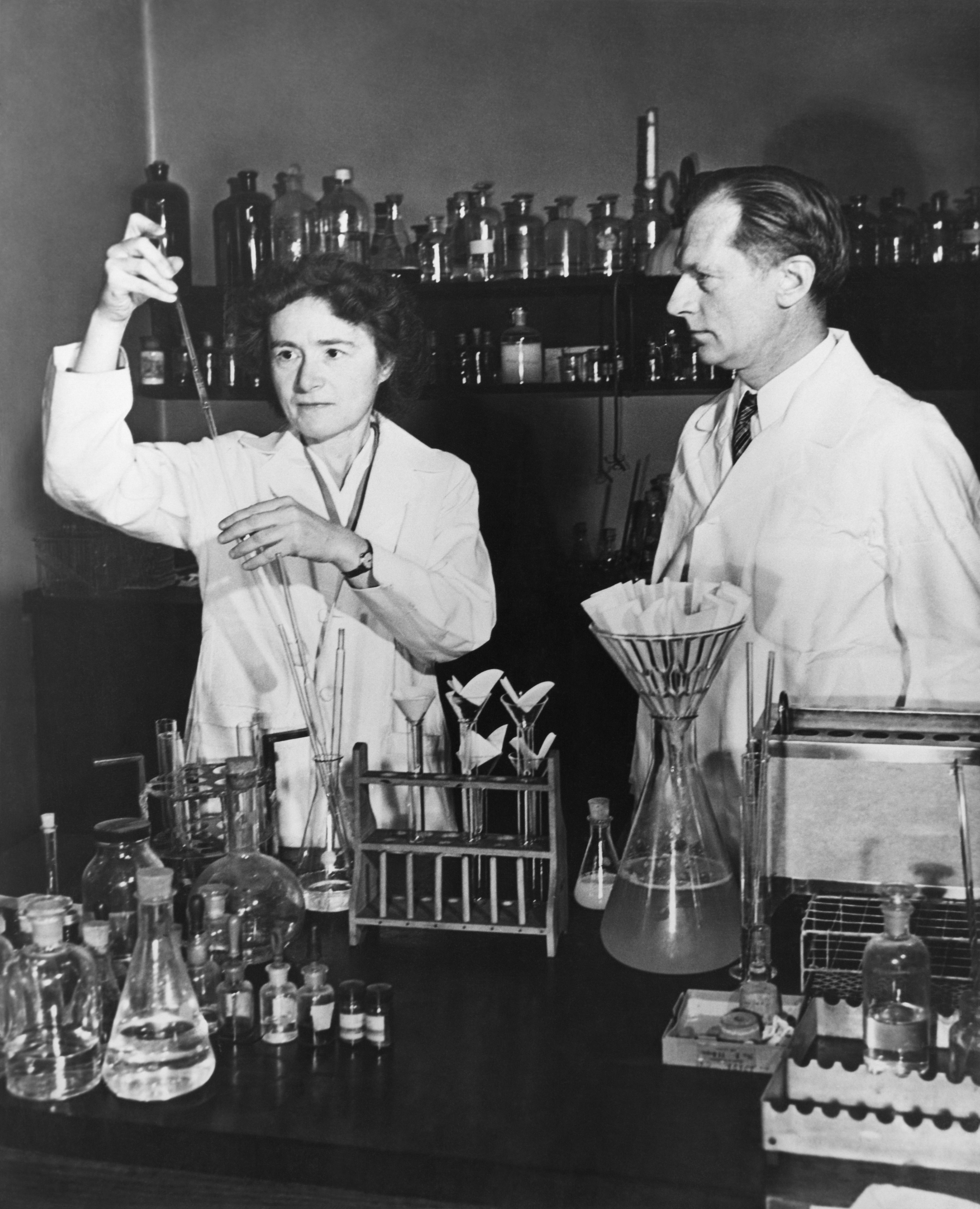
Carl Cori with his wife and fellow-Nobelist, Gerty Cori, in 1947

Carl Ferdinand Cori, ForMemRS (December 5, 1896 – October 20, 1984) was an Austrian-American biochemist and pharmacologist. He, together with his wife Gerty Cori and Argentine physiologist Bernardo Houssay, received a Nobel Prize in 1947 for their discovery of how the glucose derivative glycogen (animal starch) is broken down and resynthesized in the body for use as a store and source of energy. In 2004, both Coris were designated a National Historic Chemical Landmark in recognition of their work that elucidated carbohydrate metabolism.

== Education and early life ==
Carl Ferdinand Cori was born on December 5, 1896, in Prague, Austria-Hungary (now the Czech Republic). Carl was the son of Carl Isidor Cori, a zoologist, and Maria Cori (née Lippich), a daughter of the Austrian physician Ferdinand Lippich.

The Cori family came from the Papal State (later the Roman Republic, today's Central Italy) to the royal Bohemian crownland, (Monarchical Austria at the end of the 17th century). Carl Ferdinand's grandfather Eduard Cori was an administrative officer and beekeeper in Brüx, and his grandmother was Rosina Trinks. Carl Ferdinand's younger sister Margarete Cori (born 1905) was a lecturer in Prague and the wife of the Bohemian geneticist Felix Mainx.

He grew up in Trieste, where his father Carl Isidor was the director of the Marine Biological Station. In late 1914 the Cori family moved to Prague and Carl entered the medical school of Charles University in Prague. While studying there he met his future wife Gerty Theresa Radnitz. He was drafted into the Austro-Hungarian Army and served in the ski corps, and later was transferred to the sanitary corps, for which he set up a laboratory in Trieste. At the end of the war Carl completed his studies, graduating with Gerty in 1920. Carl and Gerty married that year and worked together in clinics in Vienna. Their only child, Tom, married Anne, a daughter of the American constitutional lawyer and anti-feminist Phyllis Schlafly.

== Career ==
Carl was invited to Graz to work with Otto Loewi to study the effect of the vagus nerve on the heart (Loewi would receive the Nobel Prize in Physiology or Medicine in 1936 for this work). While Carl was in Graz, Gerty remained in Vienna. A year later Carl was offered a position at the State Institute for the Study of Malignant Diseases (now Roswell Park Comprehensive Cancer Center) in Buffalo, New York, and the Coris moved to Buffalo. In 1928, they became naturalized citizens of the United States.

While at the Institute the Coris' research focused on carbohydrate metabolism, leading to the definition of the Cori cycle in 1929. In 1931, Carl accepted a position at the Washington University School of Medicine in St. Louis, Missouri. Carl joined as professor of pharmacology and in 1942 was made professor of biochemistry. In St. Louis, the Coris continued their research on glycogen and glucose and began to describe glycogenolysis, identifying and synthesizing the important enzyme glycogen phosphorylase. For these discoveries, they received the Nobel Prize in Physiology or Medicine in 1947, making them the third ever married couple to win the Nobel Prize.

Gerty died in 1957 and Carl married Anne Fitzgerald-Jones (1909-2006) in 1960. He stayed on at Washington University until 1966, when he retired as chair of the biochemistry department. He was appointed visiting professor of Biological Chemistry at Harvard University while maintaining a laboratory space at the Massachusetts General Hospital, where he pursued research in genetics. From 1968 to 1983, he collaborated with noted geneticist Salomé Glüecksohn-Waelsch of the Albert Einstein College of Medicine in New York, until the 1980s when illness prevented him from continuing. In 1976, Carl received the Laurea honoris causa in Medicine from the University of Trieste. Carl shares a star with Gerty on the St. Louis Walk of Fame. In 2016 the Cori's son, Thomas, donated his parents Nobel Prize medals to the Washington University School of Medicine where they are on display in the Becker Medical Library.

== Awards and honors ==
In addition to winning the Nobel Prize, Cori won the Albert Lasker Award for Basic Medical Research in 1946 and in 1959, the Austrian Decoration for Science and Art. Cori was elected a member of the United States National Academy of Sciences in 1940, a member of the American Philosophical Society in 1947, a member of the American Academy of Arts and Sciences, and a Foreign Member of the Royal Society (ForMemRS) in 1950. The Carl Cori Endowed Professorship at Washington University is named in his honor, currently held by Colin Nichols.
