= Franz Xaver Zippe =

Bohemian natural philosopher, scientist and mineralogist

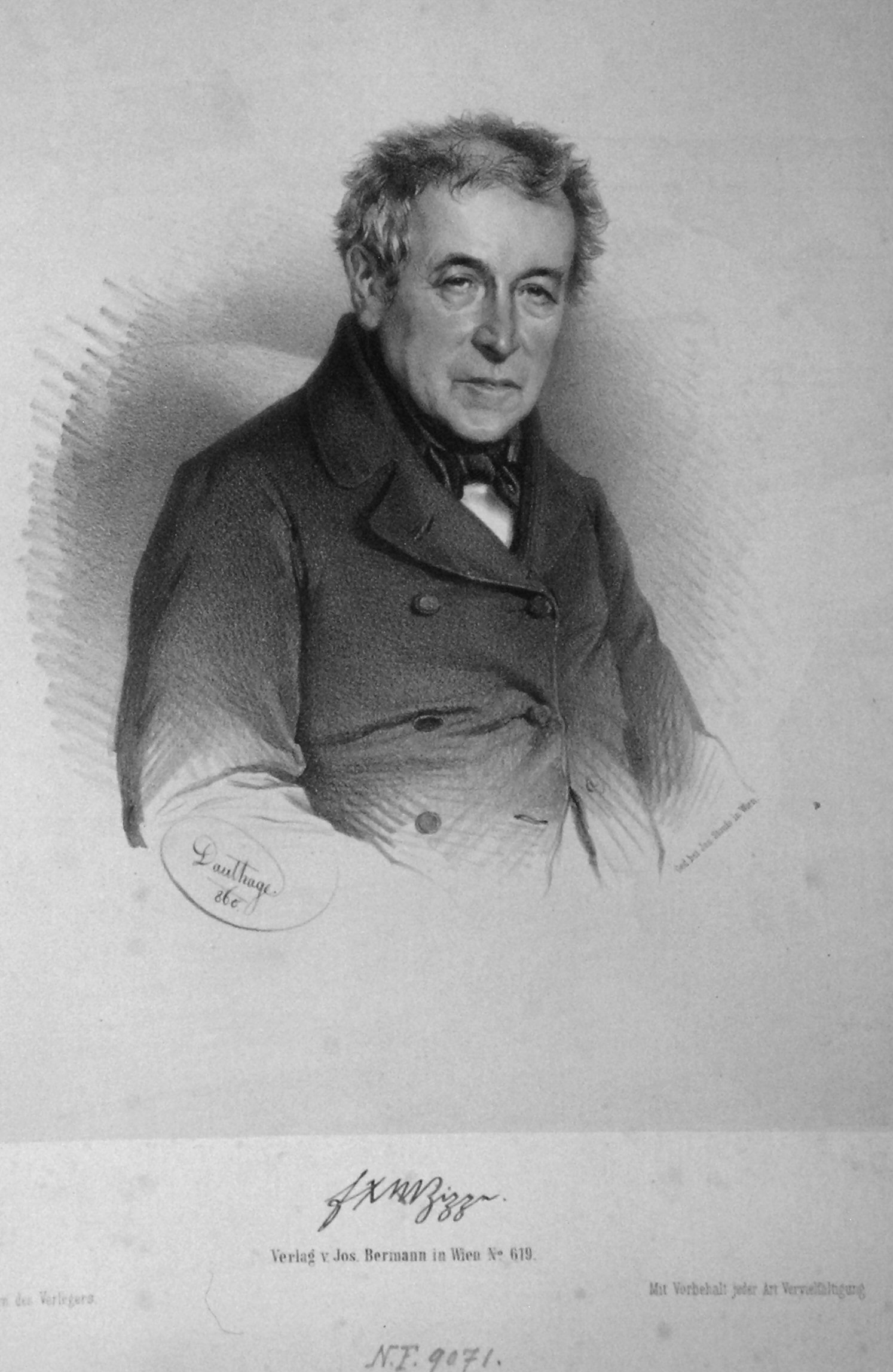
- Lithograph of Zippe by Adolf Dauthage, 1860
- Born: 15 January 1791; Nieder Falkenau (now Kytlice), Austrian Empire
- Died: 22 February 1863 (aged 72); Vienna, Austria
- Occupation: Mineralogist

Franz Xaver Maximilian Zippe (František Xaver Zippe) (15 January 1791 – 22 February 1863), was a Bohemian natural philosopher, scientist and mineralogist.

== Biography ==
After attending secondary school in Dresden, Zippe studied philosophy at the Prague University from 1807 to 1809. While still a student, he attended lectures of the chemist Karl August Neumann (1771-1866) and Josef Johann Steinmann (1779-1833), a professor of general chemistry at the Polytechnic Academy in Prague. Zippe developed a close relationship with Dr. Steinmann. Starting in 1819 Zippe taught mineralogy, first as an adjunct, and beginning in 1822 as an assistant professor at the Polytechnic. In 1835 he became a full professor.

Zippe was a close associate of Count Kaspar Maria von Sternberg, the founder of the Prague Museum of the Bohemian Kingdom (predecessor of the National Museum in Prague). Zippe, who was known during his youth for his passion for collecting was one of the first conservators of the Institute. Beginning in March 1819 he described and catalogued the collection and added to it his own self-made crystal models.

In November 1824, Zippe was placed in charge of the mineralogical department of the museum, which position he held until 1842. During this period, he enriched the museum with numerous mineral specimens from his frequent collecting trips which included mining sites in the mountains of the Giant Mountains, Isergebirge (Jizera) and Altvatergebirge (Hrubý Jeseníky). Beginning in 1833 he worked with Johann Gottfried Sommer on the 16-volume Topography of Bohemia.

In 1846, Zippe became a corresponding member of the Bavarian Academy of Sciences. In 1847 he became one of the first members of the Imperial Academy of Sciences in Vienna. From 31 August 1849 until 1 October 1850, he served as the Director of the Mining Academy at Příbram. Beginning in the Fall of 1850, he taught mineralogy at the University of Vienna.

The uranium mineral Zippeite, first found at St. Joachimsthal (Jáchymov), was named in his honor.
