= Heinrich Blyssen =

German Jesuit controversialist

Heinrich Blyssen (Latin Henricus Blissemius, Czech Jindřich Blyssem) (1526 – 24 April 1586) was a German Jesuit controversialist against the Hussites of Bohemia.

== Life ==
He was born at Cologne or Bonn. He entered the Society of Jesus, and Ignatius Loyola sent him with eleven other Jesuits to Bohemia to combat heresy there, and to sustain a public discussion with the disciples of Martin Luther and Hus.

In 1556 he became professor of theology and Hebrew at the Jesuit college at Prague. To continue the work of public lectures which he began, he gave a Sunday course of polemics to the clergy and laity. Appointed rector of the college at Prague in 1561, he was transferred in 1570 to the college at Graz, where he continued with lectures on theology. He died at Graz.

== Works ==
Maintaining his controversy with the heretics of Bohemia, he published a collection of theses: De ciborum delectu atque jejunio (Prague 1559). Attacked by Jacob Heerbrand on his doctrine concerning the Church, he published a defense of his thesis as Defensio assertionum theologicarum de verâ et sacrosanctâ Christi, quam habet in terris, Ecclesiâ militante (Ingolstadt, 1577). His last and major work, De uno geminoque sacrae eucharistiae synaxeos salubriter percipiendae ritu ac usu, was published (Ingolstadt, 1585) when he was provincial of Austria.
