= Johannes Vodnianus Campanus =

- Born: 27 December 1572; Vodňany, Bohemia
- Died: 13 December 1622 (aged 49); Prague, Bohemia
- Education: University of Prague
- Occupations: Composer, pedagogue, poet, dramatist

Johannes Vodnianus Campanus (also Ionnes Campanus Vodnianus; Czech: Jan Campanus Vodňanský, Jan z Vodňan or Jan Kampánus Vodňanský; 27 December 1572 – 13 December 1622) was a Czech humanist, composer, pedagogue, poet and dramatist.

== Life ==
He was born in Vodňany (hence his surname), in southern Bohemia (now the Czech Republic). He studied at the University of Prague and in 1596 and was made Master of Liberal Arts there. He became a teacher in Prague and Kutná Hora. From 1603 he taught Greek and Latin at the University of Prague. He also taught history and Latin poetry. He was repeatedly appointed as dean, prorector, and rector of this university.

Campanus was a Hussite before renouncing this faith and becoming a Catholic in 1622.

He died in Prague. A historical novel was published about him in 1909 by Zikmund Winter, called Mistr Kampanus: historický obraz.

== Works ==
Campanus usually wrote his works in Latin, but also wrote occasionally in Czech, Greek, and German. Some of his works, like the play Břetislav und Jitka (Bretislaus) (1614), were forbidden, because they were critical of the dukes of Bohemia. His works were recognised in Europe for their metrical perfection.

Campanus' first collection of musical works, Sacrarum odarum libri duo, was published in Frankfurt in 1613. The Sacrarum odarum, which includes Rorando coeli, contains primarily short vocal works set in a simple, homorhythmic style.

- Turcicorum tyrannorum qui inde usque ab Otomanno rebus Turcicis praefuerunt, descriptio (1597)
- Heilige Oden/Posvátné ódy (Umdichtung der Psalmen Davids/Přebásnění Davidových žalmů)
- Cechias (a history of Bohemia in verse form)
- Bretislaus (play)
- Elegie der Angst (Czech: Elegie o strachu)
- Bitte um Frieden (Czech: Prosba o mír)

His chants include:

- Ad Jehovam
- Ad puelli Jesuki cunas
- Rorando coeli: Rorando coeli has two choirs. They imitate one another throughout. The double choir technique utilised in this motet evokes the more complex antiphonal works of Campanus' contemporaries in Venice.

== Poems ==
- Tristitia (In lectulo quaero meo)
- Surge iam linquens (Surge iam linquens thalamum tepentem)

These were published in 1612, and can be found in the Cantica canticorum in Odaria, LIII, od. 17. They were set to music by Jan Novák in the 20th century.

== Sources ==
- University of Mannheim biographical source (in German)
- University of Mannheim source (in German)
- Lawrence Kaptein, Rorando Coeli
- The Lied and Art Song Texts Page
- Medieval literature
- Laudatio Mansfeldiana aneb "Zrádci Plzáci" (in Czech)
- World Catalogue Libraries
