= Franz Ignatz Cassian Hallaschka =

Czech physicist

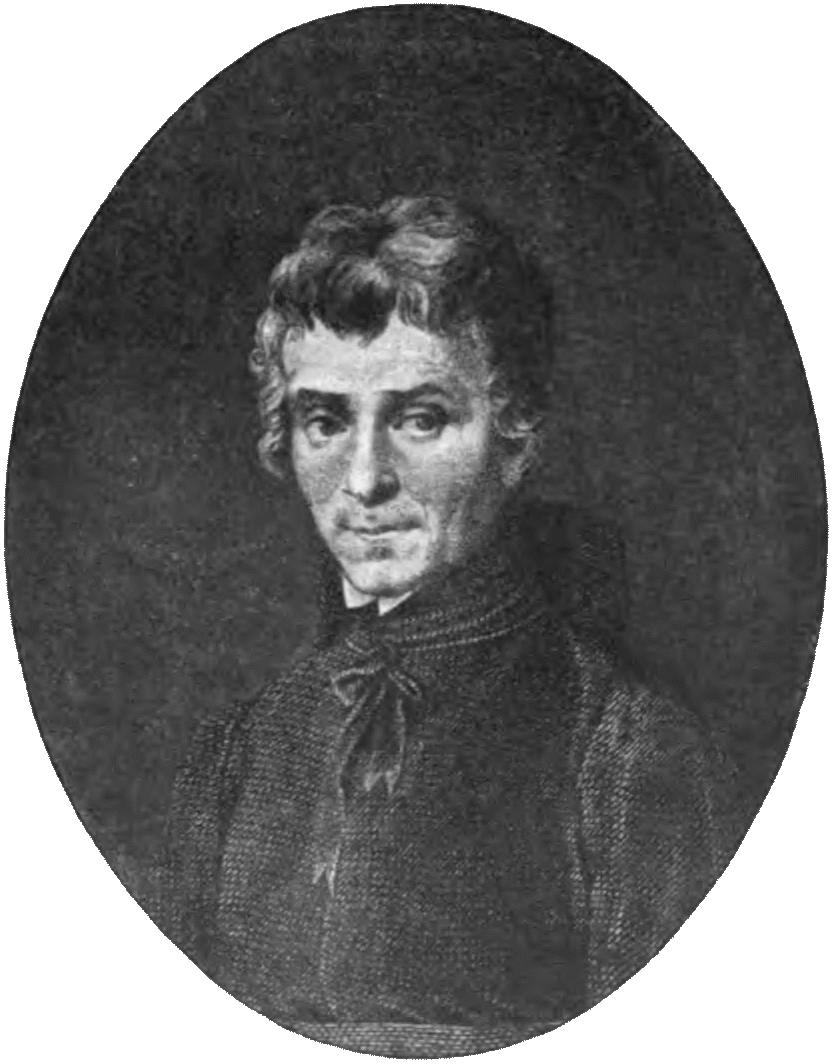
Franz Ignatz Cassian Hallaschka

Franz Ignatz Cassian Hallaschka (Czech: František Ignác Kassián Halaška; 10 July 1780 – 12 July 1847) was a Czech physicist of Moravian-German ethnicity.

He was born on 10 July 1780 in Budišov. In 1799, he became a member of the Piarists. He studied mathematics, physics, philosophy and theology at schools in Strážnice, Mikulov and Kroměříž, receiving his ordination in April 1804. In 1806, he taught classes in mathematics and physics at the Ordenscollegium in Nikolsburg, and during the following year, obtained his PhD at the University of Vienna. In 1808, he became a professor of physics in Brno, where he established an observatory. From 1814 to 1833, he was a professor of physics at the University of Prague. In 1816, he published "Elementa eclipsium quas patitur tellus", a work in which he calculated all solar eclipses observable from the Earth for the years 1816 up until 1860. In 1823, he became a member of the Royal Bohemian Society of Sciences, and in 1831 was appointed university rector.

In 1833, he was named a government counselor and a referent to the Studienhofcommission at Vienna. From 1838 until his death, he served as a provost to Stará Boleslav and as a country prelate of Bohemia. He died on 12 July 1847 in Prague.

== Selected works ==
- Elementa eclipsium quas patitur tellus, luna eam inter et solem versante, ab A.1816 usque ad A.1860, (The elements of eclipses), 1816.
- Die freie Municipalstadt Bautsch in Mähren in geographisch-topographischer und historischer Beziehung, 1822 – The Moravian city of Budišov in geographic-topographical and historical relationships.
- Geographische Ortsbestimmung von Altbunzlau, 1822 – Geographical localization of Stará Boleslav.
- Handbuch der Naturlehre, 1824 – Manual of nature philosophy.
- Geographische Ortsbestimmung von Steinschönau (with Franz Xaver Heinrich Kreylich) 1826 – Geographical localization of Kamenický Šenov.

Educational offices
| Preceded by Julius Vincenz von Krombholz | Rector of Charles University; 1832 | Succeeded by Tomáš Karel Härdtl |
