= Julius Vincenz von Krombholz =

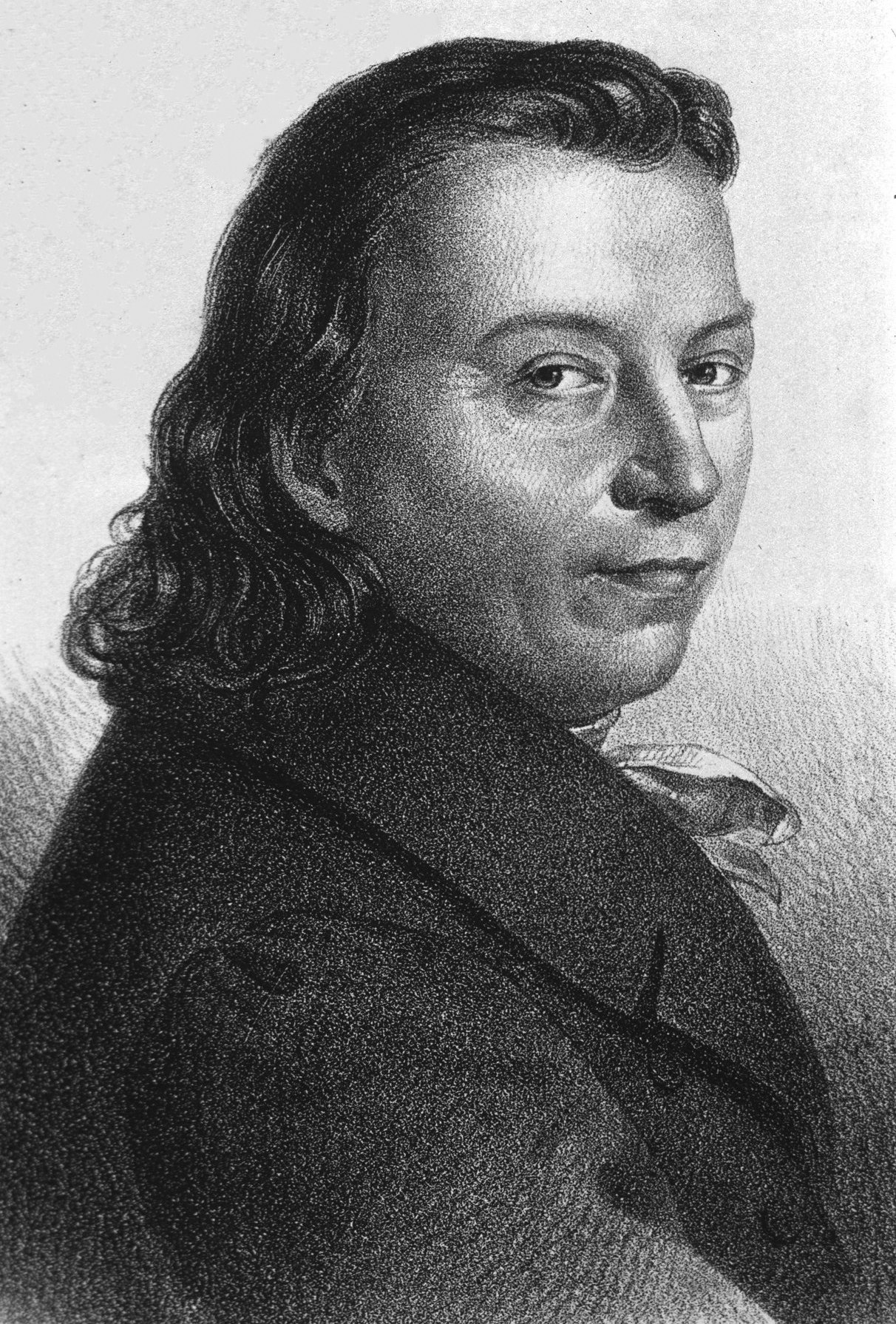
Portrait of Krombholz from the Portraiten-gallerie berühmter aerzte und naturforscher Wein (1838)

Julius Vincenz von Krombholz (Czech: Julius Vincenc von Krombholz; 19 December 1782 – 1 November 1843) was a Czech medical doctor and mycologist. He is considered one of the founders of Czech mycology. He was the rector of the University of Prague in 1831.

== Life ==
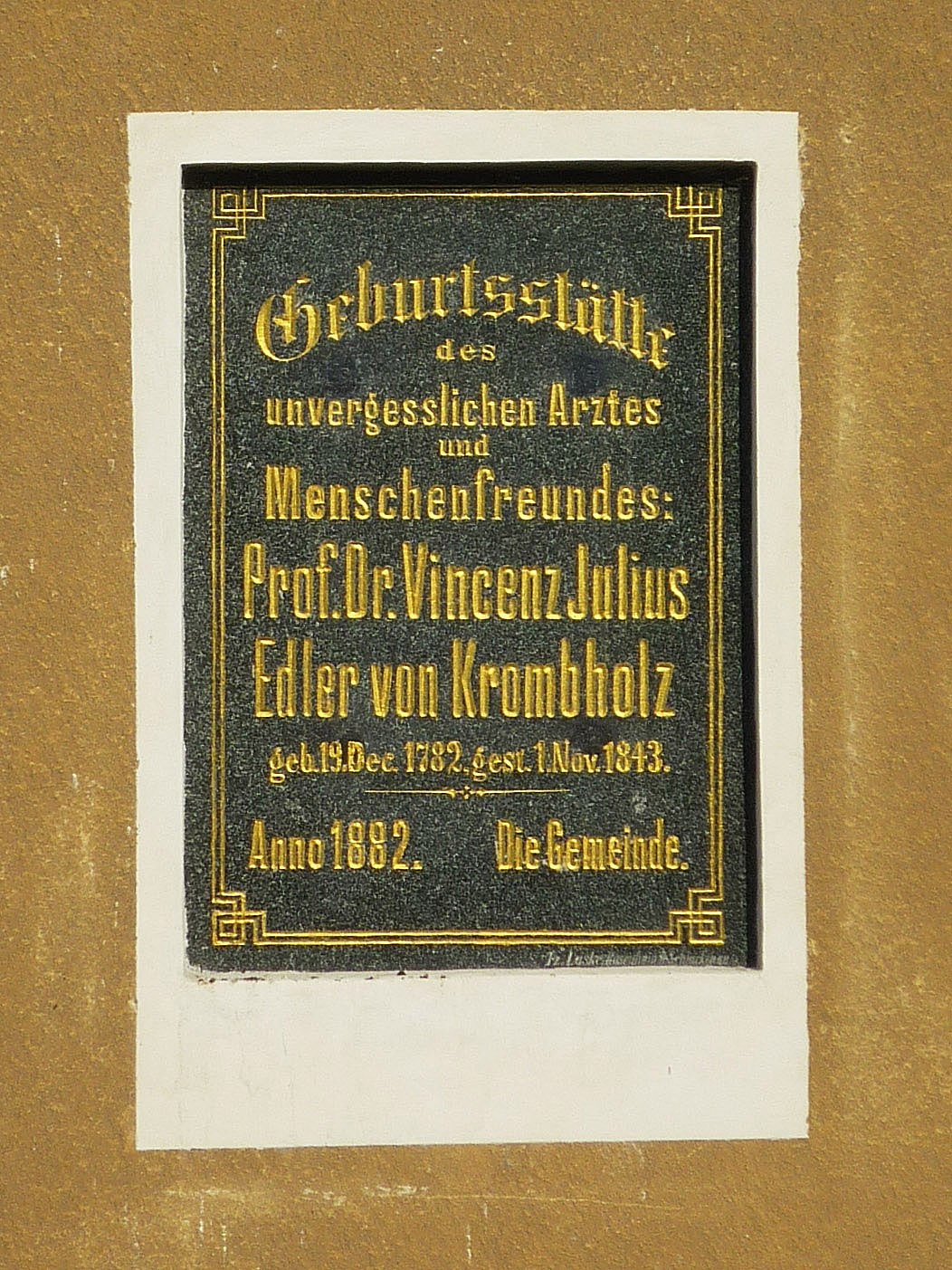
Memorial plaque on Krombholz's birth house in Horní Police

He was born on 19 December 1782 in Horní Police, Bohemia (today the Czech Republic). His father Ignác Krombholz was a teacher, and his mother was Marie Alžběta née Nanichtová. He studied medicine at the University of Prague, receiving his doctorate in 1814. In 1828, he was appointed professor of special pathology and therapy. He became an internationally recognised general practitioner. In 1831, during a cholera epidemic in Prague, he cared for the sick and became director of cholera hospitals in Prague. He used his influence to help the penniless August Carl Joseph Corda (1809–1849) get admitted to the University of Prague. In 1831, he was named rector of the University of Prague.

In 1837, he was ennobled for his medical and pedagogical services. He died in Prague on 1 November 1843. He was buried at the Olšany Cemetery in Prague. His mummified heart is still preserved in the clinic of the 1st Faculty of Medicine, Charles University.

== Mycology ==
In addition to his career in medicine, Krombholz had a keen interest in mycology. He is considered one of the founders of Czech mycology. He was primarily interested in the types of mushrooms brought to the markets in Prague. He probably did not go to the woods, but as a medical doctor, he saved patients with poisonings and wanted to find out which fungi caused them. He was the author of the first mycological atlas in the Czech lands.

He performed numerous experiments involving the toxicity of mushrooms. He is known for Naturgetreue Abbildungen und Beschreibungen der essbaren, schädlichen und verdächtigen Schwämme (1831–1846), a publication on mushrooms that was based on his own observations. It is acclaimed for its true-to-nature pictures and its descriptions of edible, harmful and suspect mushrooms. Krombholz died before its completion, and latter parts of the work were edited by Johann Baptista Zobel (1812–1865). Other noted works by Krombholz include:

- Abhandlungen aus dem Gebiete der gesammten Akologie, zur Begründung eines Systems derselben, 1825
- Anatomische Beschreibung eines sehr merkwurdigen Anencephalus (with three copperplates), 1830
- General-Rapport über die asiatische Cholera zu Prag im Jahre 1831 und 1832 nach den in den Choleraspitälern gewonnenen Erfahrungen, 1836

A number of mushrooms were first described by Krombholz. As such, the standard botanical author abbreviation Krombh. is applied to the scientific names of these species. The genus Krombhlolzia (synonym Zeugites) from the family Poaceae is named in his honour.

== Gallery ==
Illustrations from Naturgetreue Abbildungen und Beschreibungen der essbaren:

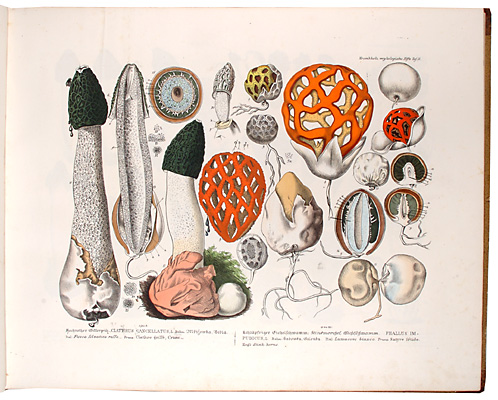

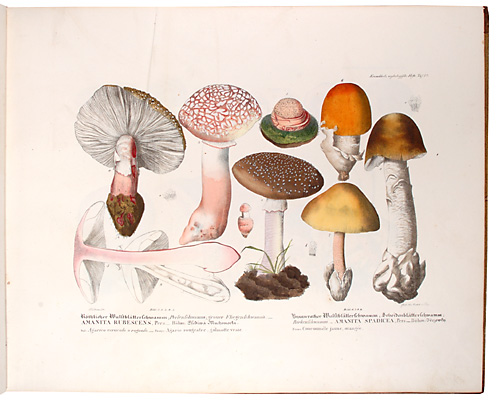

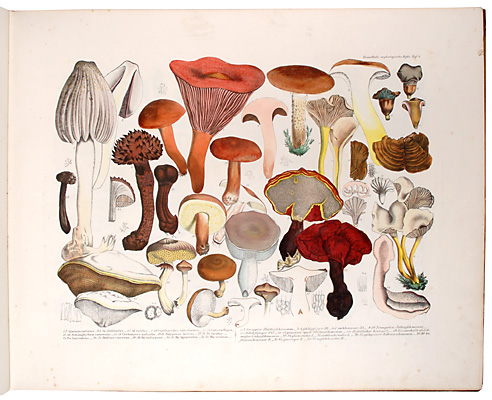

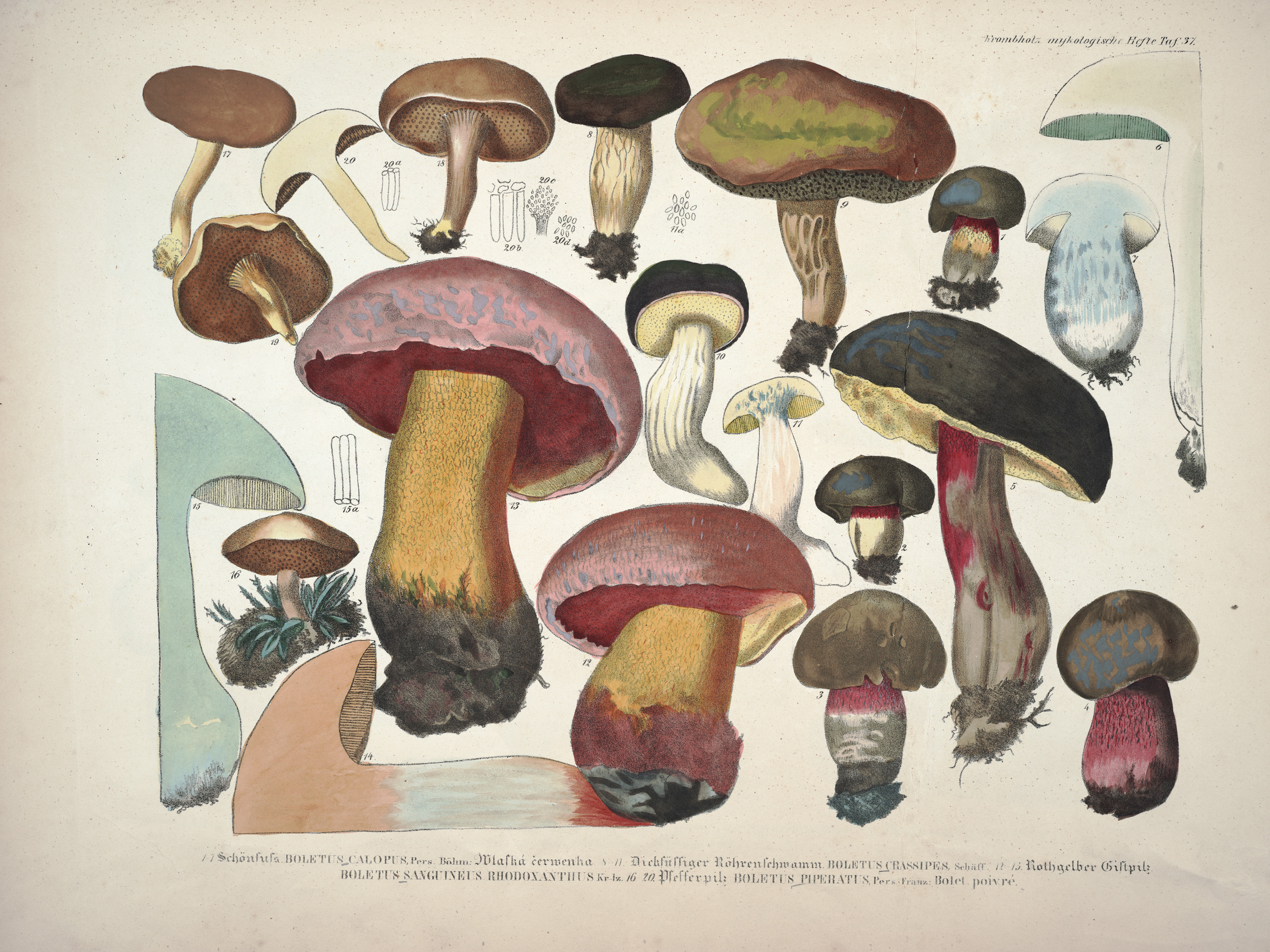

Educational offices
Preceded by František Tippmann	Rector of Charles University; 1831	Succeeded by Franz Ignatz Cassian Hallaschka
