= Carl Isidor Cori =

Austrian biologist

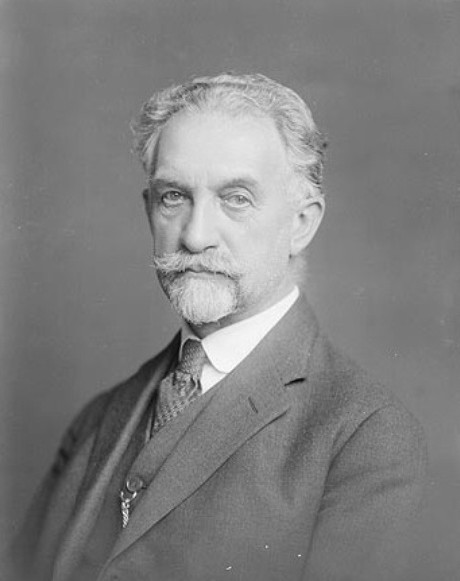
Carl Isidor Cori, 1915

Carl Isidor Cori (24 February 1865 – 31 August 1954) was an Austrian zoologist and professor who specialized in marine biology. His son, Carl Ferdinand Cori, won a Nobel prize in medicine in 1947.

Cori was born in Brüx to Eduard who director of the chancellery in the city, and Rosina. He became interested in nature from a young age and became an assistant to Berthold Hatschek in Prague from 1887. He received a doctorate in 1889 from Leipzig University, a degree in medicine in 1891 from Prague and habilitated in 1892. He took an interest in comparative anatomy of invertebrates and examined the Kamptozoa and Phoronidea. In 1898 he became in-charge of the zoological station in Trieste and handled marine biology courses for students from around the world. From 1919 to 1935 he taught at the Karl Ferdinands University in Prague.

He married Maria (1870–1922) daughter of mathematics professor Ferdinand Lippich (1838–1913) in Prague in 1892 and they had a son, Carl Ferdinand, who won a Nobel prize in medicine in 1947, and two daughters, one being Margarete who married Felix Mainx, professor of biology.
