= Josef Johann Steinmann =

Czech-Austrian pharmacist and chemist

Josef Johann Steinmann (8 March 1779 – 9 July 1833) was a Czech-Austrian pharmacist and chemist.

== Life ==
Steinmann was born on 8 March 1779 in Lanškroun, Bohemia. He worked as a pharmacist in Lanškroun and Prague, during which time, he conducted botanical investigations in the Giant Mountains and in Glatzer Land. Later on, he studied pharmacy in Berlin as a student of Sigismund Friedrich Hermbstädt, then in 1806–1608 furthered his education at the University of Vienna, where his instructors included botanist Joseph Franz von Jacquin and naturalist Carl Franz Anton Ritter von Schreibers. From 1812 to 1817 he served as an assistant to chemist Karl August Neumann at the Prague Polytechnical Institute, where in 1817 he was appointed a professor of chemistry.

He provided chemical analyses of mineral springs at Marienbad (now Mariánské Lázně), Bílina, Karlovy Vary, et al., and is credited with describing a new mineral species (cronstedtite, 1821). He also made significant contributions to the National Museum in Prague.

Steinmann died on 9 July 1833 in Prague.

== Published works ==
- Chemische Untersuchung des Karpholiths, 1819 – Chemical analysis of carpholites.
- Chemische Untersuchung des Cronstedtit's eines neuen Fossils von Pribram in Böhmen, 1820 – Chemical analysis of cronstedtite from Příbram in Bohemia.
- Physikalisch-chemische Untersuchung der Ferdinandsquelle zu Marienbad, 1821 (with Julius Vincenz von Krombholz) – Physico-chemical study of the Ferdinand spring at Marienbad.
- Das Saidschitzer Bitterwasser, 1827 (with Franz Ambrosius Reuss) – The bitter waters of Saidschitz.
