= Johann von Kelle =

Johann von Kelle (March 15, 1828 – January 30, 1909) was a German philologist who studied the German language.

== Biography ==
He attended the Ludwig-Maximilians-Universität München where he studied classical philology. Inspired by Johann Andreas Schmeller, he turned his attention to the German language, and received a Ph.D. from the University of Würzburg in 1854. From 1855 to 1857, he was an editor for a Berlin publisher, where he oversaw the development of an encyclopedia. During this time, he got to know the Grimm brothers. In 1857, he was made a full professor of German language and literature at the University of Prague, where he remained until his retirement in 1899. From 1891 to 1892, he served as university rector.

== Works ==
His work on Otfrid von Weissenburg includes:

- Otfrids von Weissenburg Evangelienbuch, Regensburg 1856.
- Die Formen- und Lautlehre der Sprache Otfrids, Regensburg 1869.
- Christi Leben und Lehre, besungen von Otfrid : Aus dem Althochdeutschen übersetzt, Prag 1870.
- Glossar zu Otfrids Evangelienbuch (1879–81).

His work on Notker Labeo is no less important: in general it aims to prove that the writings bearing his name are not by a school or group of translators, but by Notker alone. Writings include:

- Das Verbum und Nomen in Notker's Boëthius, Wien 1885.
- Die Sankt Galler deutschen Schriften und Notker Labeo (1888).
- Untersuchungen zur Überlieferung, Übersetzung, Grammatik der Psalmen Notkers, Berlin 1889.

Other works:

- Die Jesuiten-Gymnasien in Österreich (1873).
- Vergleichende Grammatik der germanischen Sprachen, vol. 1, Prag 1863.
- Geschichte der deutschen Litteratur von der ältesten Zeit bis zur Mitte des 11. Jahrhunderts (1892).
- Die Quelle von Ezzos Gesang von den Wundern Christi, in: Sitzungsberichte der philosophisch-historischen Classe der Kaiserlichen Akademie der Wissenschaften, vol. 129, Wien 1893.
- Speculum Ecclesiae (1858).
