= Johannes Cardinalis von Bergreichenstein =

Johannes Cardinalis von Bergreichenstein (also John Cardinal of Reinstein, Czech: Jan Kardinál z Rejnštejna; c. 1375 – after 1428) was a lawyer and diplomat from Bohemia.

He was rector of Charles University in Prague 1416-1417.

In 1394 he took up the study of law at the Charles University in Prague and received his doctorate at Jan Hus in 1404 to champion the seven liberal arts. 1407 was followed by the examination for Bachelor of laws. Two years later he was already as an envoy of King Wenceslas IV. together with Christian von Prachatitz and Peter de Mladoniovicz at the Council of Pisa in part. As followers of Jan Hus, they should provide for the repeal of the ban imposed against this church. A year later he defended Hus against the Archbishop of Prague Zbynko Zajíc of rabbit castle and accompanied Hus as a representative of the University, together with Peter of Mladoňovic, on his journey to the Council of Constance, where he received neither a prelate, nor the support of the Holy Roman Emperor Sigismund.

After his return to Bohemia, he was appointed in 1417 as rector of the university. Under his leadership, became the symbol of the Hussites - the cup - cemented in the minds of scholars. John spread in his tenure, the laity -Teaching of Hus and protested his innocence and integrity. On 10 March 1417 he issued a proclamation in which the doctrine was confirmed as for all Christians. He sent this input even at the Council of Constance, which it saw the confirmation of the Bohemian heresy. The Pope went so far that he no longer recognized the University of Prague.

During the Hussite wars he belonged together with Jan of Příbrami to the moderate wing, which sought a compromise with the Catholic Church. Because of his diplomatic skills were chosen Cardinalis in 1421 as a member of a delegation that offered the Bohemian throne to the Polish king Władysław II Jagiełło. At the end of the year he was with John of Seelau, Jakobellus of Mies and Peter Payn to the administrators of the chalice teaching. Later they banished him from Prague. Already in 1425 he represented Prague in negotiations with the Taborites. The last written reference to him is dated 1428, when he held the office of Archbishop administrator.
