= Christian of Prachatice =

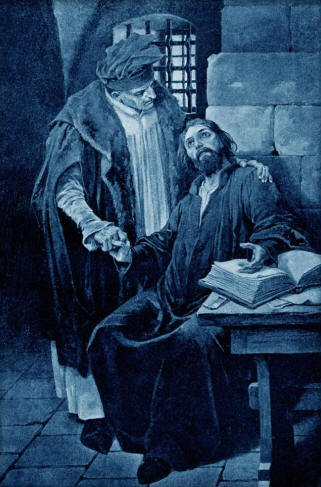
- Born: before 1370; Prachatice
- Died: 4 September 1439; Prague
- Other names: Křišťan z Prachatic; Cristannus de Prachaticz
- Education: Charles University
- Scientific career
- Fields: astronomy; mathematics; medicine

Christian of Prachatice (Czech: Křišťan z Prachatic) (1360–1368, Prachatice, Kingdom of Bohemia – 4 September 1439, Prague, Kingdom of Bohemia) was a medieval Bohemian astronomer, mathematician and former Catholic priest who converted to the Hussite movement. He was the author of several books about medicine and herbs, and contributed to the field of astronomy with many papers and data recordings.

== Biography ==
Christian of Prachatice was born in the 1360s, perhaps 1366 or 1368. In 1386 he matriculated at Charles University, where he earned a bachelor's degree two years later and a master's degree in liberal arts in 1390.

He later taught at the university and counted Jan Hus among his students. In 1403 he served as dean of the Faculty of Arts and 1405 as rector of the university. In 1405 he was appointed pastor of The Church of St. Michael the Archangel in Prague's Old Town; it is not known where he was ordained. Together with Johannes Cardinalis von Bergreichenstein, he attended the Council of Pisa in 1409.

In 1415 he defended Jan Hus at the Council of Constance. Returning to Prague, he served as dean of the Faculty of Philosophy from 1417. Ten years later, in 1427, he was forced to flee from the radical Hussites. He returned two years later and in 1434 he converted back to Catholicism was once again elected rector.

Christian of Prachitice died on 4 September 1439, a victim of the plague epidemic.

== Writings ==
Christian of Prachatice produced numerous treatises, primarily in the fields of astronomy, mathematics, and medicine. His theological writings survive only in a few fragments.

His works survive in manuscript copies at the Bayerische Staatsbibliothek, the library of Saint Peter's Abbey, Salzburg, and the Königsberg State and University Library, as well as the Beinecke Rare Book and Manuscript Library.

=== Latin ===
- De composicione astrolabii, on the composition of the astrolabe;
- De utilitate (usu) astrolabii, on the use of the astrolabe;
- Regula ad fixanda festa mobilia;
- Algorismus prosaycus, on translating Roman numerals into Arabic numerals;
- Computus chirometralis, an aid to counting on fingers;
- Antidotar;
- Herbularium, an herbal;
- De sanguinis minucione, treatise on bloodletting.

=== Czech ===
- Lékařské knížky;
- Knihy o mocech rozličného kořenie, an herbal.

=== German ===
- Theriak-Pest-Traktat;
- Arzneibüchlein des Magisters Christian von Prachatitz.
