= Jan Seidel =

German football referee

- Born: 10 October 1984 (age 42); Hennigsdorf, Germany

Domestic
Years	League	Role
2008–	Regionalliga Nord	Referee
2009–	3. Liga	Referee
2009–	2. Bundesliga	Assistant referee
2012–	Bundesliga	Assistant referee

International
Years	League	Role
2016–	UEFA	Assistant referee
2019–	FIFA	Assistant referee

Jan Seidel (born 10 October 1984) is a German football referee.

Jan Seidel lives in Oberkrämer. He is a DFB referee for Grün-Weiß Brieselang. He has managed games in the North Regional league since the 2008–09 season, and he has managed the games in the 3rd division from the 2009–10 season up until the 2011–12 season. He later specialized as an assistant referee.

As a linesman, Seidel has been involved in the 2. Bundesliga games since the 2009/10 season and the Bundesliga games since the 2012–13 season. Since the 2016–17 season he has been a linesman of the UEFA Europa League, and since the 2017–18 season, the UEFA Champions League.

In April 2021, he was nominated along with Rafael Foltyn to be part of Daniel Siebert’s refereeing team for the UEFA Euro 2020 in June and July 2021.

In May 2022, he was once again nominated together with Rafael Foltyn to be part of Daniel Siebert's refereeing team for the 2022 FIFA World Cup in November and December 2022.
