= Karl von Czyhlarz =

Czech-Austrian jurist and politician (1833–1914)

Karl Ritter von Czyhlarz
- Karel Cihlář
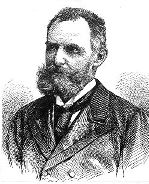
- Born: 17 August 1833; Lovosice, Bohemia, Austrian Empire
- Died: 21 June 1914 (aged 80); Vienna, Austria, Austria-Hungary
- Education: Charles University in Prague
- Occupations: jurist, politician

Karl Ritter von Czyhlarz or Karel Cihlář (17 August 1833 – 21 July 1914) was a Czech-Austrian jurist and politician.

== History ==
He taught as a professor at the Charles University in Prague in 1858–1892 and at the University of Vienna in 1892–1904. He was a specialist of the Roman law.

Von Czyhlarz was a member of an assembly of Bohemia (1866–1886), and a member of the Upper Chamber of the Austrian Reichsrat (from 1898).

== Literary works ==
- Lehrbuch der Institutionen des römischen Rechts, 1933
