= Joseph Hasner =

Joseph Hasner, Ritter von Artha (13 August 1819 – 2 February 1892) was an Austrian ophthalmologist born in Prague. His brother, Leopold Hasner von Artha (1818–1891), was an influential Austrian politician.

He studied medicine at the University of Prague, and subsequently worked at the local general hospital (1842). In 1843 he was an assistant at Johann Fischer's eye clinic. In 1848 he gained his habilitation, and in 1852 he became an associate professor. From 1856 he was a "full professor" of ophthalmology and a primary physician in Prague. Starting in 1869 he was an editor of the Vierteljahrsschrift für die praktische Heilkunde (from 1880- Zeitschrift für Heilkunde).

Hasner is remembered for the discovery of plica lacrimalis, which is a fold of mucous membrane that guards the lower opening of the nasolacrimal duct. This membrane goes by other names, including "Hasner's valve" and "Hasner's fold". Also, he put forth the theory that myopia was caused by stretching of the eyeball — this being due to pulling on the posterior pole by the optic nerve.

== Published works ==
Among his numerous publications is Klinische Vorträge über Augenheilkunde (Clinical Lectures on Ophthalmology), which is a collection of Hasner's lectures on eye diseases and ophthalmoscopy. Other noted writings by Hasner include:

- Beiträge zur Physiologie und Pathologie des Tränenableitungsapparats (Contributions to the Physiology and Pathology of the Lacrimal Drainage Apparatus), 1851
- Beiträge zur Physiologie und Pathologie des Auges (Contributions to the Physiology and Pathology of the Eye), 1873
- Über die Grenzen der Akkommodation des Auges (On the Limits of Accommodation of the Eye), 1875
- Das mittlere Auge in seinen physiologischen und pathologischen Beziehungen (The Median Eye in its Physiological and Pathological Relationships), 1879
- Die Verletzungen des Auges in gerichtsärztlicher Beziehung (The Injuries of the Eye in Forensic Medical Relationships), In: Maschka's Handbuch der gerichtlichen Medizin, Tübingen 1880
- Tycho Brahe und I. Kepler in Prag (Tycho Brahe and I. Kepler in Prague), 1872
