= Zdeněk Češka =

Czech academic, lawyer, and politician (1929–2023)

Zdeněk Česka

Member of the House of the People of Czechoslovakia
- In office 23 October 1976 – 5 June 1981

Personal details
- Born: 6 February 1929 Prague, Czechoslovakia
- Died: 14 January 2023 (aged 93)
- Party: KSČ
- Education: Charles University
- Occupation: Academic; Lawyer

Zdeněk Česka (6 February 1929 – 14 January 2023) was a Czech academic, lawyer, and politician. A member of the Communist Party of Czechoslovakia, he served in the House of the People from 1976 to 1981.

Česka died on 14 January 2023, at the age of 93.
