= Ziegelbauer =

Ziegelbauer is a German surname. Notable people with this surname include the following:

- Bob Ziegelbauer (born 1951), American politician from Wisconsin
- Magnoald Ziegelbauer (1689–1750), German Benedictine monk and ecclesiastical historian
- Maximilian Ziegelbauer (1923–2016), German Roman Catholic theologian and bishop
