= Petrasch =

Moravian family

In the seventeenth century, a wealthy family of bourgeois origins named Petrasch emerged to some prominence in Moravia, near Brno. In the latter part of the century, seeking excitement, two scions of the family, Ernst Anton (b. 1680) and Maximilian (b. 1668), joined the Habsburg military and served in the border campaigns against the Ottoman Empire. Eventually, the brothers acquired distinction in such actions as the Battle of Lugos and the Austro-Turkish War (1716–1718) they came to the notice of such commanders as Prince Eugene of Savoy, General Claudius Florimund Mercy, and the Louis, the Duke of Baden. The brothers achievements which continued in the military careers of their sons; by the latter third of the eighteenth century, the descendants of both brothers had acquired the title of Freiherr ('baron') in the county of Moravia. In 1722, the titles of both brothers were converted from a Bohemian dignity to a Hungarian one.

== Two brothers ==
In 1695, the two brothers joined Habsburg service under Count Friedrich Veterani in the seven cavalry regiments of 6500 men and 800 infantry at Lugos against Sultan Mustafa II. The Ottoman army included about 85,000 men (Janissaries, Spahis, and Tatars). Although initially Veterani's force drove the Turks back, Veterani was captured and beheaded on the battle field, and Ernst and Maximilian were wounded.

=== Ernst Anton ===
After the Treaty of Karlowitz (26 January 1699), Ernst Anton joined Count Ôttingen in Smyrna; afterward he traveled to the Barbary states, the island of Sardinia, and to France, where he was in 1703 when the War of the Spanish Succession broke out. He joined the imperial army, in the same regiment of cuirassiers in which he had served earlier. He advanced up the grade of ranks to lieutenant colonel in the regiment Schönborn, via the patronage of Field Marshal Count Mercy, who instructed him to transport supplies to the besieged Pančevo, an exceptionally dangerous mission. On 16 April 1717, he embarked toward Petrovaradin, having previously received the sacraments, given the church 200 florins, and had the blessings of the a priest. He successfully delivered the supplies, and on the return was waylaid by the Turkish fleet which far outnumbered his own vessels. The powder in his ship ignited and exploded, and most of his crew were killed. Severely wounded himself, he was captured and brought to Belgrade, where the local Pasha treated him well. Eventually though, he was sent to Edirne where he was imprisoned in irons, and subsequently transported to Constantinople. There, he languished in one of the prisons, awaiting for his rescue or exchange. Mercy and Eugene of Savoy sent Colonel Baron von Neipperg to conclude a peace between Austria and Venice, and in the course of negotiations, Ernst Anton was freed when Mercy removed some Hungarian settlers from a contested border region. Following his release, he remained in Mercy's service. He was promoted to lieutenant field marshal in 1734 and served in Eugene of Savoy's campaign against the French. In one notable action, he moved under the guns of Mainz with 2,000 men to observe the enemy and report on the enemy movement, and to relieve Count Wallis. He had a son, Ernst Gottlieb.

=== Maximilian ===
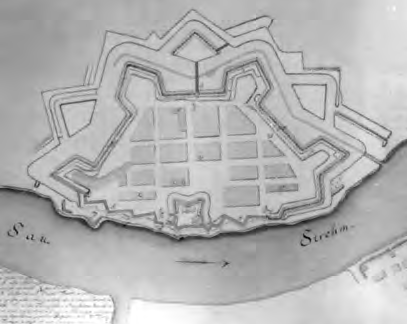
Fortress of Gradiška in 1750.

Maximilian joined the imperial army as a common cavalryman in the cuirassiers Gondola. He was badly injured at Lugos; this wound never healed and in later life made it difficult, or impossible, for him to mount a horse. In five years, he became an officer, but he fell into the hands of insurgents, who tried to persuade him to join their own party. By 1716, during the Austro-Turkish War (1716–1718) he was a colonel and commander of the fortress of Slavonski Brod in Slavonia. He outwitted the contingent guarding Gradiška fortress, lured them into an ambush, then burned the city Gradiška to the ground.

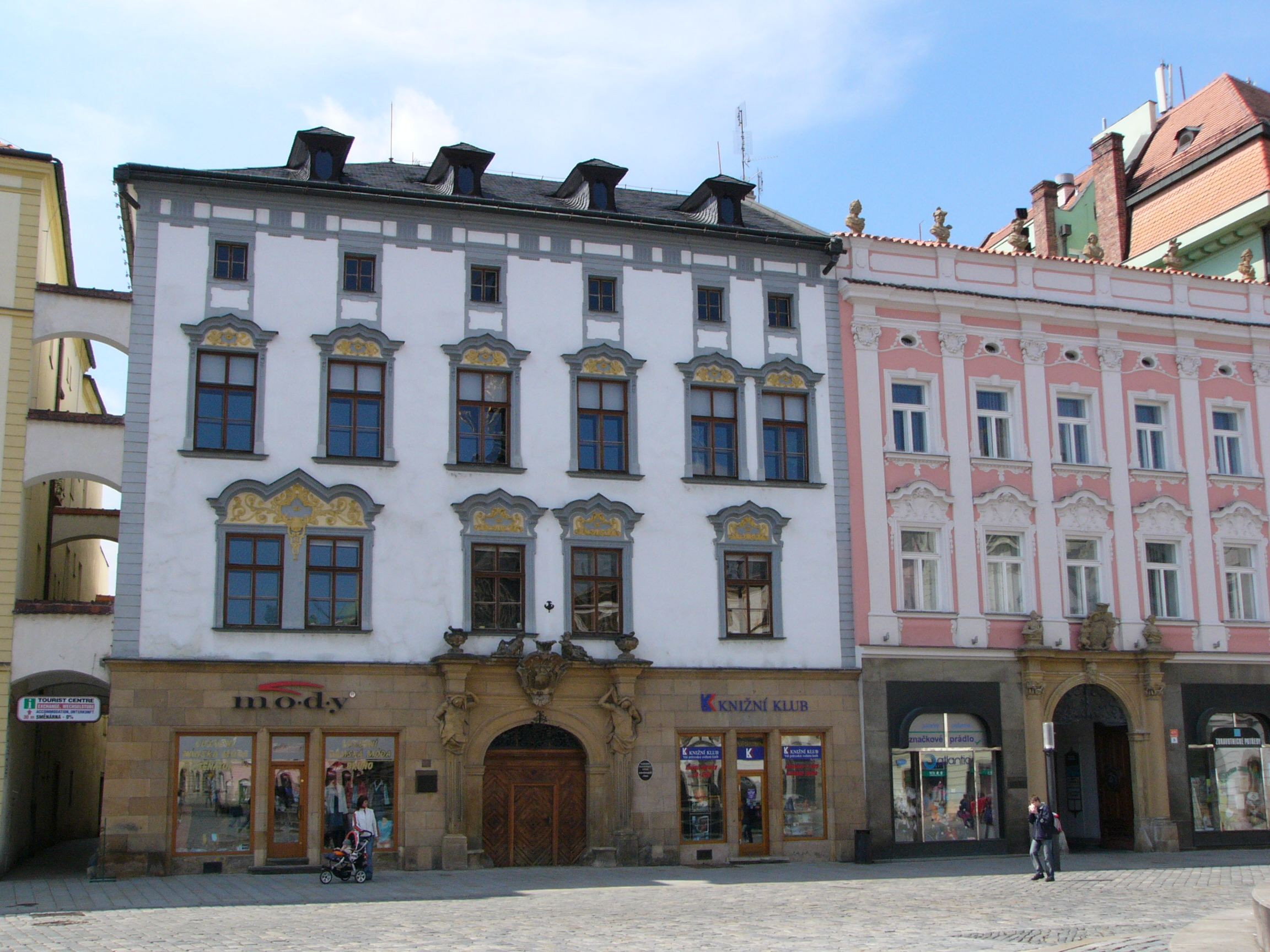
Maximilian's city home in Olomouc.

Like his brother, Maximilian became a favorite of Prince Eugene. When attacking Derlent, his old wound broke open and prevented him from mounting his horse, so he directed the attack from a litter. In 1717, he commanded a failed siege against the city of İzvornik. In 1718, he was stationed on the border along the Sava river to Belgrade, where he defended the fortress of Osijek against the attack of Claude Alexandre de Bonneval. In 1722 he received a barony from the Empress of Hungary. Eventually he retired to his estate near Breslau, where he died at the age of 56 after several weeks of suffering. He had married Maria Anna, Countess of Becker, and had a son, Joseph von Petrasch.

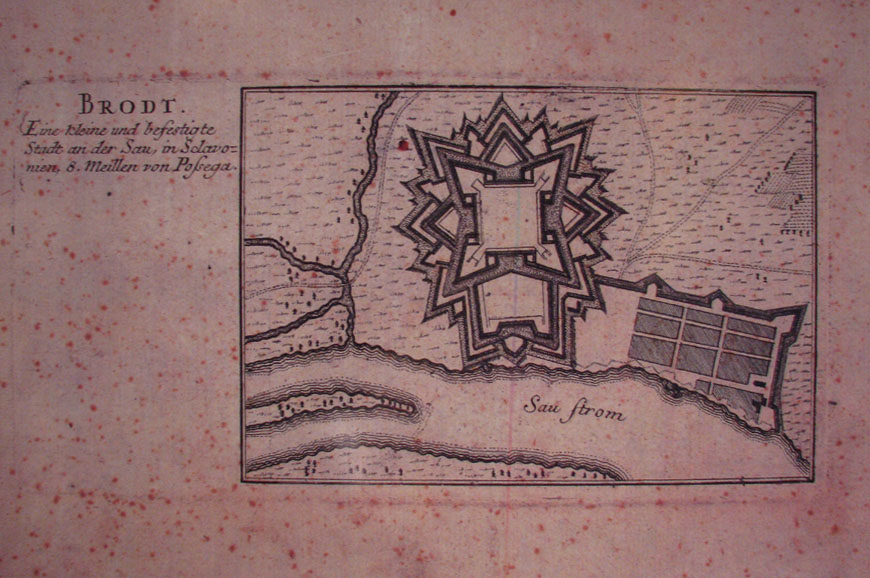
Plan of Fortress at Slavonski Brod, where Maximilian was military commander.

=== Descendants ===
==== Joseph ====
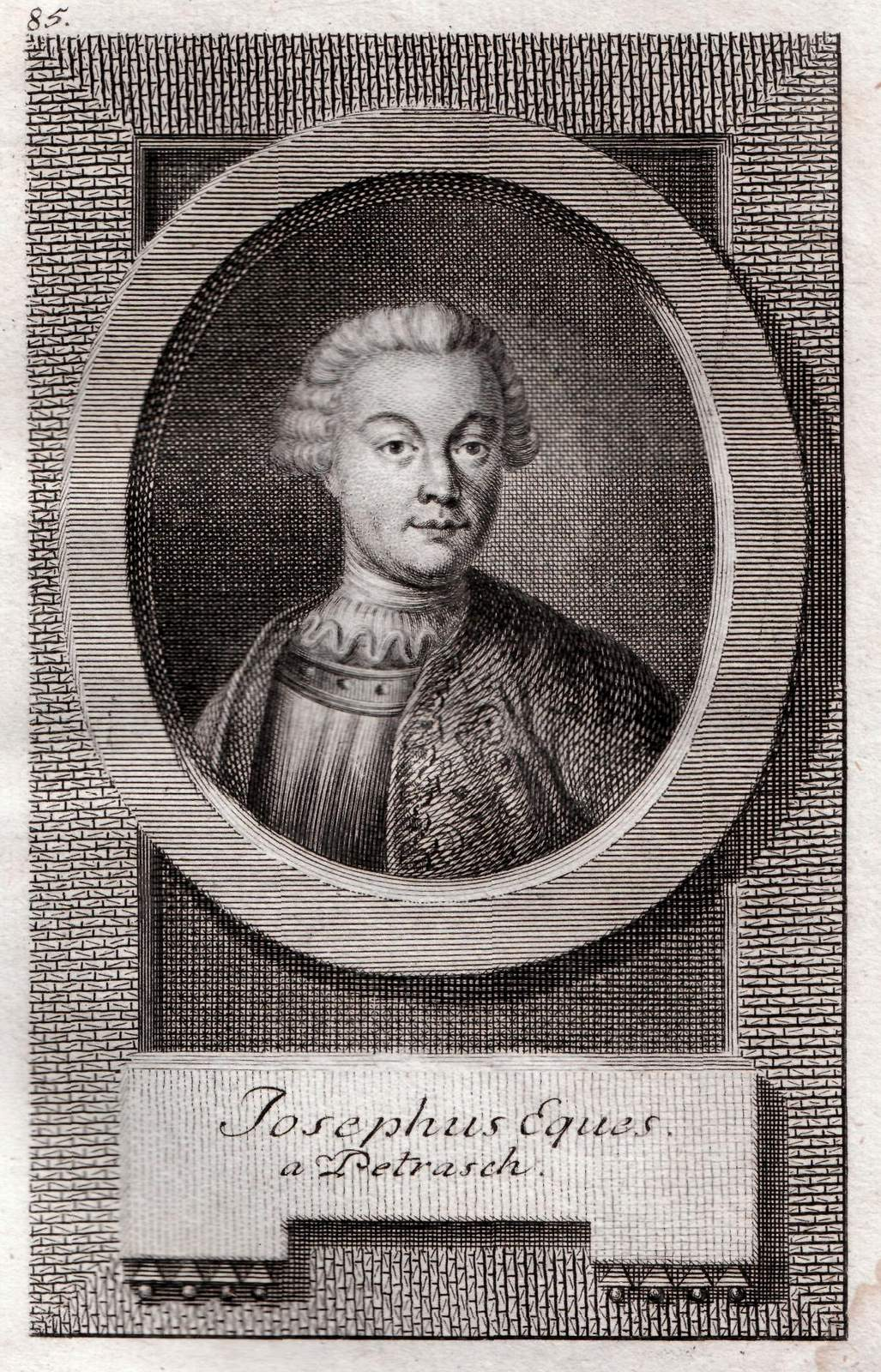
Portrait of Joseph von Petrasch (1714-1772)

Joseph, Maximillian's son, was a scholar and a soldier. Born at Slavonski Brod in Slavonia 19 October 1714, he was the only son of the Maximilian from his marriage to Maria Anna Countess Beckers. He was educated by a canon of Trnava, Mathias Schupanschik, who taught him the first elements of the Latin, poetics and rhetoric; a lieutenant-colonel name Hayß taught him the mathematical sciences in the Spanish and Italian; then he came, probably because his father obtained a position in Moravia, to Olomouc, where he completed his philosophical studies at the Jesuit college and earned the Doctor philosophy when only 16 years old. He began the study of law at Louvain; subsequently, his parents sent him on a journey to Holland, England, Scotland, Ireland, France and Switzerland, the so-called European Grand Tour which took him to various learned institutions and libraries for close look at the greatest works of art, literature and science, and where he was encouraged by eminent men of science and reason to the path of Enlightenment.

Upon his return, barely 20 years old, he entered the imperial army and made adjutant of Prince Eugen some campaigns on the Rhine. He later received a company in one of the Danubian regiments, but further promotion was closed to him, once peace between Austria and France had been negotiated. He left the army, went traveling again, this time to the German universities. His mother's serious illness called him home, where he arrived three days before her death. At a young age, he found himself suddenly in possession of a considerable fortune, land, and title. He immediately resumed his journey in Germany. In Würzburg, where he remained for a long time, he became acquainted with Anne von Hettersdorf. They married and he returned to Olomouc. Eventually they had three daughters. He continued his lifelong-learning, and founded the Society of Anonymous Scholars in the Austrian Lands, of which he was president until 1758. He died at Neuschloß, his estate in Moravia, on 15 May 1772.

==== Ernst Gottlieb ====
Ernst Gottlieb, was son of Ernst Anton, had been born in Teschen, Austrian Silesia, in 1708. Like Joseph, he also enjoyed a good education; in 1728, at the age of 20, he became a cornet in the Cuirassiers Schmerzing, under the command of the Grand Duke Francis Stephen of Lorraine, who later to become Emperor Franz I. In the Turkish war he was proven as a brave soldier, was captain and last colonel. He inherited a title from his father, as hereditary master of Pehlin, a village in the County Sáros. In 1760 he was captain the Arcieren-Garde (a guard unit of the French-Comte). The educated and informed baron soon gained the favor of the Empress Maria Theresa. Petrasch one who organized the illuminations and fireworks on the occasion of the second marriage of the Archduke with Josepha of Bavaria in the Schwarzenberg Garden. As an imperial favorite, he was given the castle Holitsch, and made master of Prerau. The Empress extended his father's barony to a Hungarian barony 30 January 1767. General Petrasch married Elizabeth von Fritz, a favorite maid of the Empress Maria Theresa, and they had a daughter, who married the baron Bretton, and a son, Franz, born in 1746 at the family estate in Prerau. Ernst Gottlieb died in Vienna on 30 June 1792. He left a farm in the Prerau district to his widow, Elizabeth, and portions to Joseph Petrasch, Adelbert Petrasch and Jacob Petrasch.

=== Franz Petrasch ===
Franz Petrasch, (1746 – 17 January 1820), son of Ernst Gottlieb, entered Habsburg military service. He served through the Habsburg wars with France, in particular the Rhine Campaign of 1796 and the Swiss campaigns of 1799.
