= Benediktbeuern Abbey =

Abbey in Benediktbeuern, Bavaria, Germany

- Kloster Benediktbeuern
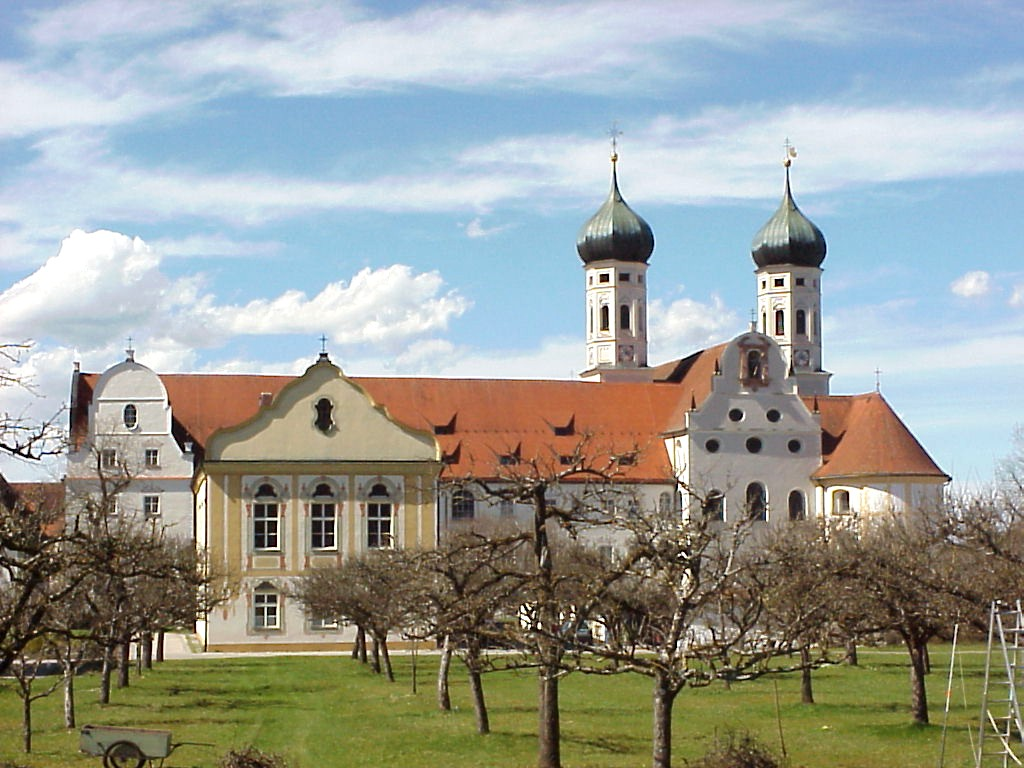
- Benediktbeuern Abbey

- Location within Germany

Religion
- Affiliation: Catholic
- Sect: Benedictines

Location
- Location: Benediktbeuern in Bavaria
- Country: Germany
- Coordinates: 47°42′27″N 11°23′57″E

Architecture
- Completed: 739

Benediktbeuern Abbey (Kloster Benediktbeuern) is an institute of the Salesians of Don Bosco, originally a monastery of the Benedictine Order, in Benediktbeuern in Bavaria, near the Kochelsee, 64 km south-south-west of Munich. It is the oldest and one of the most beautiful monasteries in Upper Bavaria. It was badly damaged in an extreme weather event in 2023.

== First Benedictine foundation ==
The monastery, dedicated to Saints James and Benedict, was founded in around 739/740 as a Benedictine abbey by members of the Huosi, a Bavarian noble clan, who also provided the three brothers who served one after the other as the first three abbots, traditionally named as Lanfrid, Waldram (or Wulfram), and Eliland, for nearly a century. It is possible that Saint Boniface had an involvement in the foundation; he may have consecrated the church (to the holy Trinity), though this is not widely accepted. There was here a school of writing, whose work survives in the form of numerous codices of the 8th and 9th centuries.

In 955 the monastery was destroyed by the Hungarians. It was restored in 969 by Wolfold, a priest, as a house of canons.

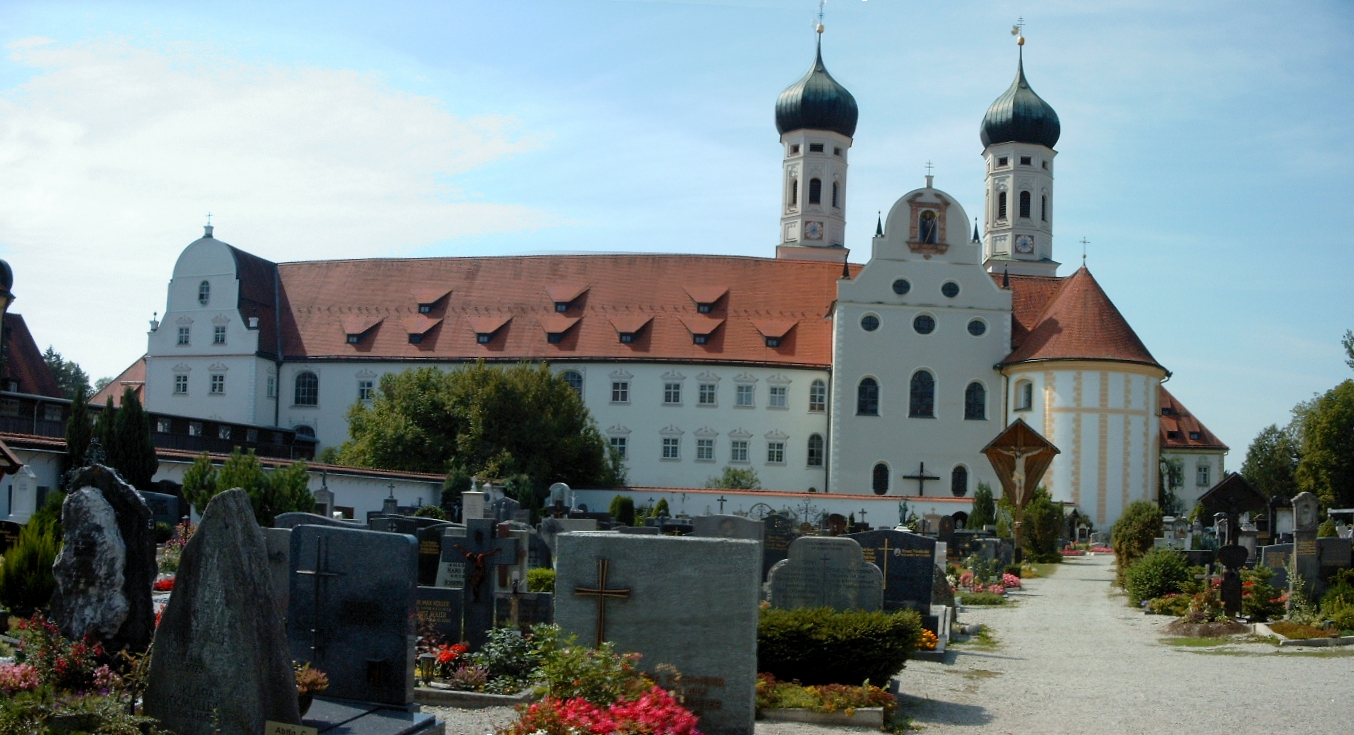
Benediktbeuern Abbey

== Second Benedictine foundation ==
Under the influence of Conrad II, Holy Roman Emperor it was rebuilt and in 1031 returned to the Benedictine rule and re-settled by monks from Tegernsee Abbey under the first abbot of the new foundation, Ellinger. Under the second abbot, Gothelm (1032–1062), and the monks Gotschalk and Adalbert the school and scriptorium were re-established. In 1052, Bishop Nitker of Freising, had been granted the abbey by Emperor Henry III without the knowledge of abbot Gothelm. In response, the monks, keen to assert their autonomy, chose to do so by documenting the history of their abbey. A monk named Gottschalk took on the task of recording, quickly producing a chronicle, a list of monastic properties, and a record of both benefactors and adversaries.

Gotschalk, now abbot, was responsible for the translation of the relics of Saint Anastasia here in 1053, which by making the abbey a place of pilgrimage added substantially to its fame and prosperity; he was also its first historian. In April 1055, the abbey received half a manse in the village of Issing. Along with this gift was presented to the monks a manuscript of Ambrose's commentary on Psalm 118.

Benediktbeuern suffered four serious fires, in 1248, 1377, 1378, and 1490, but was prosperous enough to re-build each time.

The abbey enjoyed for centuries an extremely high reputation as a place of learning and research. Botanical research and the establishment of a medicinal herb garden in about 1200 are also evidenced. In about 1250 the library covered the whole range of higher education as it then existed. The abbey also excelled at theological, philosophical and scientific studies. In the 1530s, Antonius Funda made considerable advances in the systematic writing of monastic history.

In 1611 many of the community died of the plague. During the Thirty Years' War the grammar school was suspended and in 1632 Simon Speer was tortured and put to death by the Swedes for refusing to surrender the goods of the abbey. From 1681 to 1686 the cloister church was entirely rebuilt in the Baroque style. The school had reopened by 1689, when the study of languages, music, mathematics and botany was especially emphasised. In 1698 the school in the north wing was opened. The library complex dates from 1722. Johann Michael Fischer built the Anastasia Chapel in the Abbey Church of St. Benedikt (1750–1758), considered a jewel of Baroque architecture.

In 1684 the Bavarian Congregation of Benedictine monasteries was founded by Pope Innocent XI, to which Benediktbeuern belonged until its dissolution in 1803.

In 1700, Benediktbeuern librarian and archivist Karl Meichelbeck (1669–1734) – people called the monk the "Livy of Bavaria" – used the source-critical method of historiography for the first time in South Germany. He was the author of the Historia Frisingensis ("History of the Diocese of Freising"), the Chronicon Benedictoburanum ("History of Benediktbeuern Abbey"), and the "Annals of the Bavarian Congregation".

== Secularisation 1803 ==
During the secularisation of Bavaria in 1803 the abbey, then comprising thirty-four monks, was dissolved. Some of the former monks took posts as university professors: for example, Ägidius Jais went to Salzburg as a pastoral theologian; Sebastian Mall to Landshut as an orientalist; and Florian Meilinger to Munich as a mathematician.

The library and archives had contained many priceless manuscripts and charters. Ziegelbauer printed a catalogue of the library, dated 1250, in which more than one hundred and fifty books and manuscripts are enumerated. Mabillon, who visited the abbey in 1683, and Bernard Pez, librarian of Melk Abbey, who was there in 1717, both left on record their testimony as to the great value of the codices there preserved. At the suppression the library comprised 40,000 volumes. A number of these, and many of the codices, were added to what is now the Bayerische Staatsbibliothek in Munich and the remainder left to be dispersed over time by the neglect or indifference of subsequent owners. There were reports, however, that, some books were used to fill holes in the cart tracks of the moor between the monastery and the river Loisach.

In the course of the disposal of the library and archives, there came to light the manuscript of the Carmina Burana, a 13th-century collection of songs by wandering scholars. The manuscript, also known as the Codex Buranus, is also now in the Bayerische Staatsbibliothek.

== From secularisation to 1930 ==
The abbey premises were acquired by Joseph von Utzschneider, who in 1805 set up an experimental glassworks here, known as the Optical Institute. He was joined by Joseph von Fraunhofer, who was able here among other things to develop flawless or "waveless" flint glass and discover the Fraunhofer lines which have become of importance in the development of spectroscopic analysis.

In 1818 the Bavarian State took over the buildings, which from then on were used for military purposes, initially as a stud-farm for the rearing and training of cavalry horses, and thereafter as a barracks, invalid home, military convalescent home and prison.

In 1901 Freiherr von Kramer-Klett, the restorer of several Bavarian monasteries, offered five and one-half million marks for the property, but was met by a demand for twelve millions, which he refused.

In 1925 the former abbey brewery was closed.

== From 1930 ==
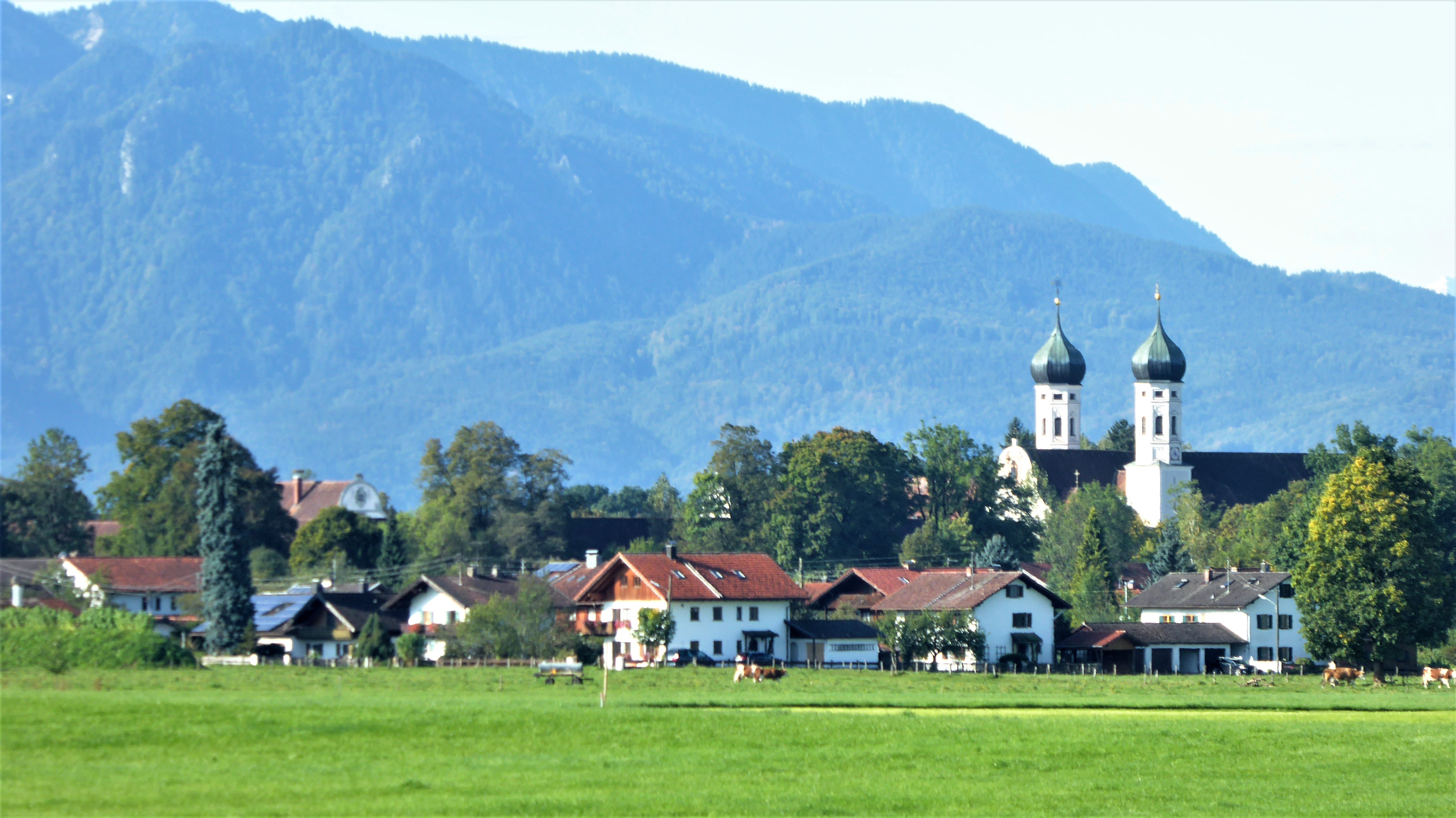
Benediktbeuern Abbey

Since 1930 the buildings have been used by the Salesians, of whom about 40 now live and work here. The former cloister is used for conferences, concerts and events.

The Meierhof, the old abbey's "steward's house" has been restored to the Centre for Environment and Culture Benediktbeuern with conference rooms and accommodations for guests. The grounds also include a youth hostel and a branch of the Catholic Foundation College Munich. Retreatants stay at the monastery guesthouse. Pilgrims on the Way of St. James and cyclists on the Lake Constance-Königssee Trail find their way takes them by Benediktbeuern.

The abbey church was declared a "basilica minor" in 1972.

== 2023 extreme weather event ==
On August 26, 2023, as a result of a storm with hail and heavy rain, all buildings in the complex, including the basilica and Anastasia Chapel, were affected. Almost all roofs were destroyed, numerous windows were broken and facades were damaged. The damage to the roof also led to water ingress in connection with its absorption into the historical, wooden building structure, so that some parts are considered to be at risk of collapse. In an initial overview, the monastery puts the total damage at a "high, double-digit million amount". The facility was completely evacuated and closed until further notice.

== See also ==
- List of Carolingian monasteries
- Carolingian architecture

== Sources ==
- Bauerreiss, Romuald (1939). "Bonifatius und das Bistum Staffelsee: Zur bayrischen Bistumsorganisation von 739". Studien und Mitteilungen zur Geschichte des Benediktiner-Ordens und seiner Zweige. 57: 1–11.
- Griffiths, Fiona J. (2021). "Froibirg Gives a Gift: The Priest's Wife in Eleventh-Century Bavaria". Speculum. 96 (4 (OCTOBER)): 1009–1038.
- Hemmerle, Josef (1991). Das Bistum Augsburg: Die Benediktinerabtei Benediktbeuern. Walter de Gruyter. ISBN 978-3-11-012927-4.
