= Magnoald =

Magnoald may refer to:

- Magnus of Füssen
- Magnoald Ziegelbauer
