= Karpe (disambiguation) =

Karpe (formerly Karpe Diem) is a Norwegian rap duo.

Karpe may also refer to:

- Karpe fig, Ficus pleurocarpa
- Franz Samuel Karpe (1747–1806), a Slovenian philosopher
