= Queriniano diptych =

Ivory diptych

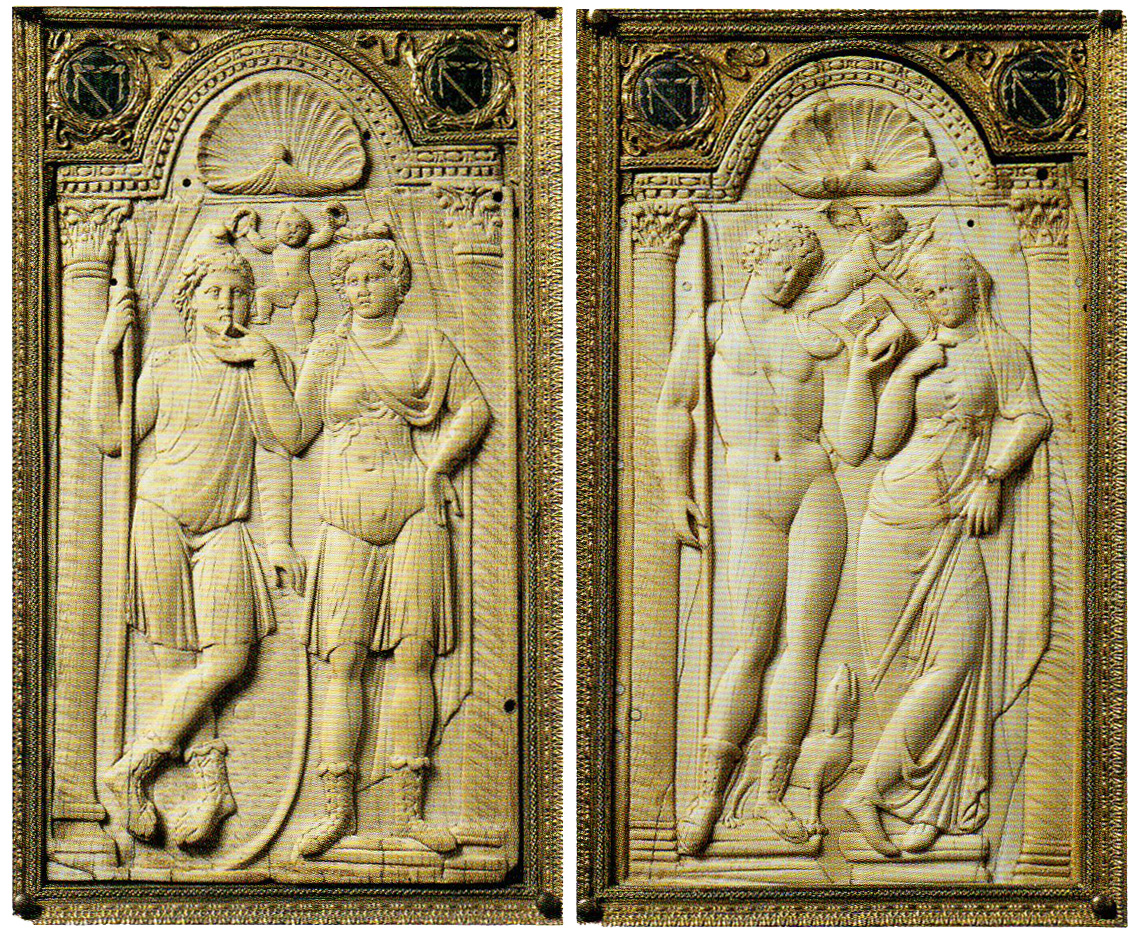
Dittico Queriniano, (25cm x 28cm x 2cm)

The Queriniano diptych, called Dittico Queriniano in Italian, is a Late Antique ivory diptych that was likely made to celebrate a wedding.

The item, presumed to be from the 5th century, was acquired by cardinal Angelo Maria Querini, who willed the item to the city to be displayed to the public. It became part of the Museo dell'Era Cristiana in the 19th century, and in the 20th century now forms part of the collections of the Museo di Santa Giulia in Brescia. One of the wings shows an engraving supporting that it was once the property of the 15th-century nobleman Pietro Barbo. Part of the cornice of one wing was made in the 19th century. Commentaries on this diptych are known from the 18th century

The tables are interpreted to depict two amorous couples from mythology, presumably Diana and Endymion on the left and Phaedra and Hippolytus on the right. Each couple is framed by a set of columns and an arch with a keystone shell.
