= Proceedings of the Natural History Society of Brünn =

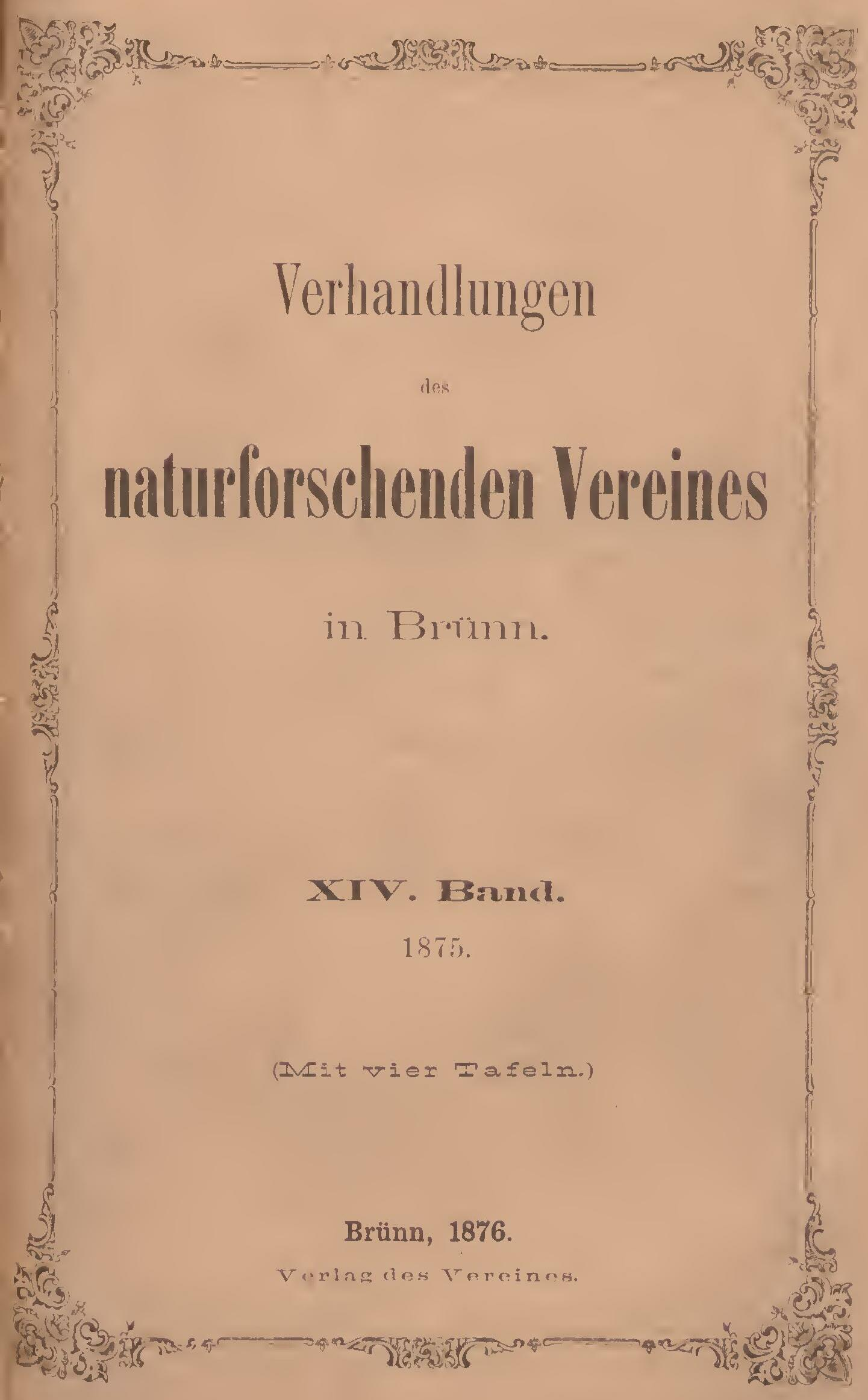
Example cover page of the journal

The Proceedings of the Natural History Society of Brünn (German: Verhandlungen des naturforschenden Vereines in Brünn) was the official journal of the Natural History Society in Brno (German: Brünn), published from 1861 to 1920. A free archive of the journal is available through the Biodiversity Heritage Library.

This was the journal where Gregor Mendel published his scientific discoveries on genetics which he made between 1856 and 1863.

The society (German: Naturforschenden Verein Brünn) was organized in 1861 by Franz Czermak, Jacob Kalmus, Alexander Makowsky, Johann Nave, and Gustav von Niessl.

== See also ==
- Monatliche Auszüge
- "Experiments on Plant Hybridization"
