= Bernhard Pez =

Austrian Benedictine historian and librarian

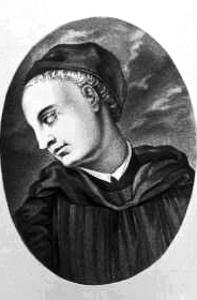
Bernhard Pez

Bernhard Pez (22 February 1683, at Ybbs near Melk – 27 March 1735, at Melk, Lower Austria) was an Austrian Benedictine historian and librarian.

== Life ==
He studied at Vienna and Krems, and in 1699 entered Melk Abbey. Having studied the classical languages, he was made professor in the Melk monastery school in 1704, and in the same year went to the University of Vienna, where he studied theology. In 1708 he was ordained priest.

He took up history, and in 1713, became librarian at Melk. As a model for his historical works he followed the French Maurists. He studied the archives of the order at Melk and Vienna, and in 1715-17 he, with his brother Hieronymus Pez, searched for manuscripts in the Austrian, Bavarian, and Swabian monasteries.

In 1716 he published a plan for a universal Benedictine library, in which all the authors of the order, and their works, should be catalogued and reviewed. He obtained from the monasteries of his order no less than seven hundred and nine titles. He also had friendly literary relations with Johann Georg von Eckhart, Johann Friedrich Schannat, Zacharias Conrad von Uffenbach, Friedrich Christoph Schmincke, Johann Lorenz von Mosheim, Johann Christian Lünig, etc. In 1728 he accompanied Count Sinzendorf to France, where he made the acquaintance of Bernard de Montfaucon, Edmond Martène, Ursin Durand, Le Texier, Antoine Augustin Calmet, etc., and enriched his collection from the libraries of the order.

== Works ==
His chief works are:

- "Thesaurus anecdotorum novissimus" (6 fol. vol., Augsburg, 1721-9), a collection of exegetic, theological, philosophical, ascetic, and historical literary sources;
- "Bibliotheca ascetica" (12 vols., 1723–40), containing the sources of ascetic literature;
- "Bibliotheca Benedictino-Maruiana" (1716).

In a controversy with the Jesuits he defended his order with the "Epistolæ apologeticæ pro Ordine S. Benedicti", 1716. In 1725 he published "Homilien des Abtes Gottfried von Admont (1165)", in two vols., and the minor philosophical works of Abbot Engelbert von Admont.

His proposed monumental work, "Bibliotheca Benedictina Generalis", was never completed. His manuscript material is partly made use of in the "Historia rei literariæ O.S.B." by Ziegelbauer-Legipont (1754). His manuscripts were preserved at Melk.
