= Gregor Mendel =

Austrian biologist and friar (1822–1884)

The Right Reverend Gregor Mendel OSA
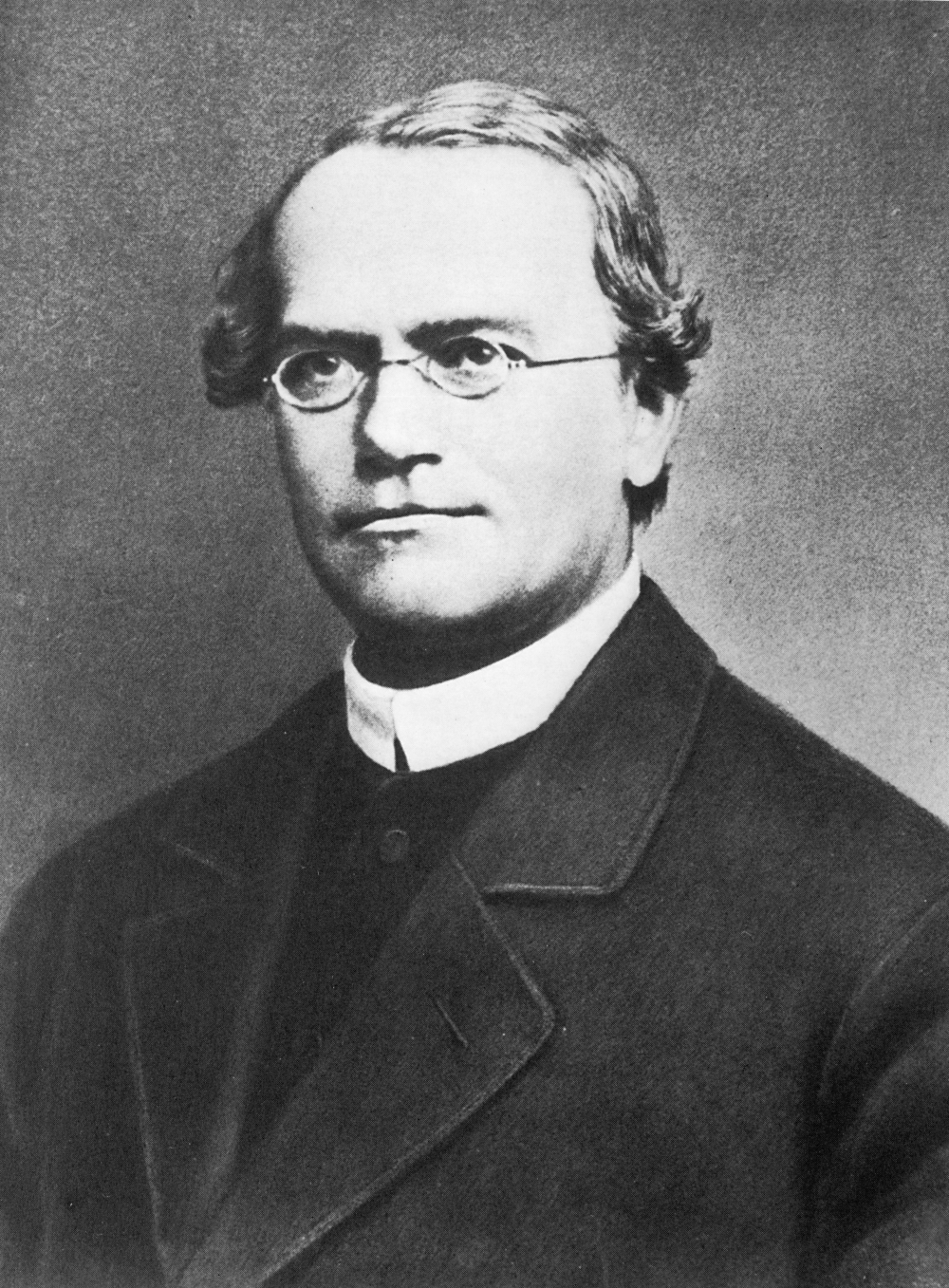
- Mendel, c. 1862
- Born: Johann Mendel; 20 July 1822; Heinzendorf bei Odrau, Silesia, Austrian Empire
- Died: 6 January 1884 (aged 61); Brno, Moravia, Austria-Hungary
- Education: University of Olmütz; University of Vienna
- Known for: Founder of the modern science of genetics
- Scientific career
- Fields: Genetics
- Workplaces: St Thomas's Abbey, Brno
- Author abbrev. (botany): Mendel

Ecclesiastical career
- Religion: Christianity
- Church: Catholic Church
- Ordained: 25 December 1846

Gregor Johann Mendel (/ˈmɛndəl/; German: [ˈmɛndl̩]; Czech: Řehoř Jan Mendel; 20 July 1822 – 6 January 1884) was an Austrian biologist, meteorologist, mathematician, Augustinian friar and abbot of St. Thomas' Abbey in Brno (Brünn), Margraviate of Moravia. Mendel was born in a German-speaking family in the Silesian part of the Austrian Empire (today's Czech Republic) and gained posthumous recognition as the founder of the modern science of genetics. Though farmers had known for millennia that crossbreeding of animals and plants could favor certain desirable traits, Mendel's pea plant experiments conducted between 1856 and 1863 established many of the rules of heredity, now referred to as the laws of Mendelian inheritance.

Mendel worked with seven characteristics of pea plants: plant height, pod shape and colour, seed shape and colour, and flower position and colour. Taking seed colour as an example, Mendel showed that when a true-breeding yellow pea and a true-breeding green pea were cross-bred, their offspring always produced yellow seeds. However, in the next generation, the green peas reappeared at a ratio of 1 green to 3 yellow. To explain this phenomenon, Mendel coined the terms "recessive" and "dominant" in reference to certain traits. In the preceding example, the green trait, which seems to have vanished in the first filial generation, is recessive, and the yellow is dominant. He published his work in 1866, demonstrating the actions of invisible "factors"—now called genes—in predictably determining the traits of an organism. The actual genes were only discovered in a long process that ended in 2025 when the last three of the seven Mendel genes were identified in the pea genome.

The profound significance of Mendel's work was not recognized until the turn of the 20th century (more than three decades later) with the rediscovery of his laws. Erich von Tschermak, Hugo de Vries and Carl Correns independently verified several of Mendel's experimental findings in 1900, ushering in the modern age of genetics.

== Early life and education ==
Mendel was born into a German-speaking family in Heinzendorf bei Odrau, in Silesia, Austrian Empire (now Hynčice in the Czech Republic). He was the son of Anton and Rosine (Schwirtlich) Mendel and had one older sister, Veronika, and one younger, Theresia. They lived and worked on a farm which had been owned by the Mendel family for at least 130 years (the house where Mendel was born is now a museum devoted to Mendel). During his childhood, Mendel worked as a gardener and studied beekeeping. As a young man, he attended gymnasium in Troppau (Czech: Opava). Due to illness, he had to take four months off during his gymnasium studies. From 1840 to 1843, he studied practical and theoretical philosophy and physics at the Philosophical Institute of the University of Olomouc (German: Olmütz), taking another year off because of illness. He also struggled financially to pay for his studies, and Theresia gave him her dowry. Later, he helped support her three sons, two of whom became doctors.

He became a monk partly because it enabled him to obtain an education without paying for it himself. As the son of a struggling farmer, the monastic life, in his words, spared him the "perpetual anxiety about a means of livelihood." Born Johann Mendel, he was given the name "Gregor" (Řehoř in Czech) when he joined the Order of Saint Augustine.

== Academic career ==
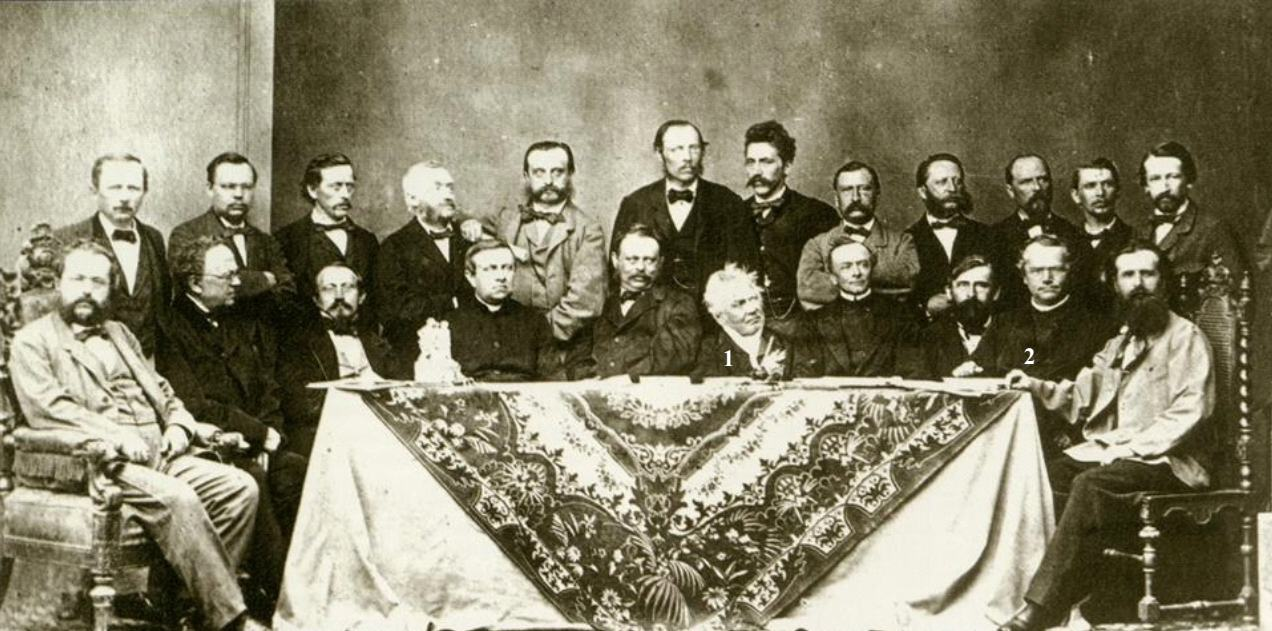
Mendel (seated second from right and numbered "2") with other faculty at the Brno Realschule in 1864 (Alexander Zawadzki is labelled "1".)

When Mendel entered the Faculty of Philosophy, the Department of Natural History and Agriculture was headed by Johann Karl Nestler, who conducted extensive research on hereditary traits of plants and animals, especially sheep. Upon recommendation of his physics teacher Friedrich Franz, Mendel entered the Augustinian St Thomas's Abbey in Brno and began his training as a Catholic priest. Mendel worked as a substitute high school teacher. In 1850, he failed his exams' oral part, the last of three parts, to become a certified high school teacher. In 1851, he was sent to the University of Vienna to study under the sponsorship of Abbot Cyril František Napp so that he could get a more formal education. At Vienna, his professor of physics was Christian Doppler. Mendel returned to his abbey in 1853 as a teacher, principally of physics. In 1854, he met Aleksander Zawadzki, who encouraged his research in Brno. In 1856, he took the exam to become a certified teacher and again failed the oral part. In the summer of 1862, he joined an organised group tour to Paris and London, where he visited the International Exhibition and major scientific sites, a trip that may have influenced the final stage of his hybridisation research. In 1867, he succeeded Napp as abbot of the monastery.

After he was elevated as abbot in 1868, his scientific work largely ended, as Mendel became overburdened with administrative responsibilities, especially a dispute with the civil government over its attempt to impose special taxes on religious institutions. Mendel died on 6 January 1884, at the age of 61, in Brno, from chronic nephritis. Czech composer Leoš Janáček played the organ at his funeral. After his death, the succeeding abbot burned all papers in Mendel's collection, to mark an end to the disputes over taxation. The exhumation of Mendel's corpse in 2021 delivered some physiognomic details like body height (168 cm (66 in)). His genome was analysed, revealing that Mendel was predisposed to heart problems.

== Contributions ==
=== Experiments on plant hybridization ===
Dominant and recessive phenotypes. (1) Parental generation. (2) F1 generation. (3) F2 generation.

Mendel, known as the "father of modern genetics," chose to study variation in plants in his monastery's 2 hectares (4.9 acres) experimental garden. Mendel was assisted in his experimental design by Aleksander Zawadzki while his superior abbot Napp wrote to discourage him, saying that the Bishop giggled when informed of the detailed genealogies of peas.

After initial experiments with pea plants, Mendel settled on studying seven traits that seemed to be inherited independently of other traits: seed shape, flower color, seed coat tint, pod shape, unripe pod color, flower location, and plant height. He first focused on seed shape, which was either angular or round. Between 1856 and 1863 Mendel cultivated and tested some 28,000 plants, the majority of which were pea plants (Pisum sativum). This study showed that, when true-breeding different varieties were crossed to each other (e.g., tall plants fertilized by short plants), in the second generation, one in four pea plants had purebred recessive traits, two out of four were hybrids, and one out of four were purebred dominant. His experiments led him to make two generalizations, the Law of Segregation and the Law of Independent Assortment, which later came to be known as Mendel's Laws of Inheritance.

==== Initial reception of Mendel's work ====
Mendel presented his paper, Versuche über Pflanzenhybriden ("Experiments on Plant Hybridization"), at two meetings of the Natural History Society of Brno in Moravia on 8 February and 8 March 1865. It generated a few favorable reports in local newspapers, but was ignored by the scientific community. When Mendel's paper was published in 1866 in Verhandlungen des naturforschenden Vereines in Brünn, it was seen as essentially about hybridization rather than inheritance, had little impact, and was cited only about three times over the next thirty-five years. His paper was criticized then but is now considered a seminal work. Notably, Charles Darwin was not aware of Mendel's paper, and it is envisaged that if he had been aware of it, genetics as it exists now might have taken hold much earlier. Mendel's scientific biography thus provides an example of the failure of obscure, highly original innovators to receive the attention they deserve.

==== Rediscovery of Mendel's work ====
The inheritance patterns following the laws originally described by Gregor Mendel by which genes and traits are passed from parents to their offspring.

About forty scientists listened to Mendel's two groundbreaking lectures, but it would appear that they failed to understand the implications of his work. Later, he also carried on a correspondence with Carl Nägeli, one of the leading biologists of the time, but Nägeli also failed to appreciate Mendel's discoveries. At times, Mendel must have entertained doubts about his work, but not always: "My time will come," he reportedly told a friend, Gustav von Niessl.

During Mendel's lifetime, most biologists held the idea that all characteristics were passed to the next generation through blending inheritance (indeed, many effectively are), in which the traits from each parent are averaged. Instances of this phenomenon are now explained by the action of multiple genes with quantitative effects. Charles Darwin tried unsuccessfully to explain inheritance through a theory of pangenesis. It was not until the early 20th century that the importance of Mendel's ideas was realized.

By 1900, research aimed at finding a successful theory of discontinuous inheritance rather than blending inheritance led to independent duplication of his work by Hugo de Vries and Carl Correns and the rediscovery of Mendel's writings and laws. Both acknowledged Mendel's priority, and it is thought probable that de Vries did not understand the results he had found until after reading Mendel. Though Erich von Tschermak was originally also credited with rediscovery, this is no longer accepted because he did not understand Mendel's laws. Though de Vries later lost interest in Mendelism, other biologists started to establish modern genetics as a science. All three of these researchers, each from a different country, published their rediscovery of Mendel's work within a two-month span in the spring of 1900.

Mendel's results were quickly replicated, and genetic linkage was quickly worked out. Biologists flocked to the theory; even though it was not yet applicable to many phenomena, it sought to give a genotypic understanding of heredity, which they felt was lacking in previous studies of heredity, which had focused on phenotypic approaches. Most prominent of these previous approaches was the biometric school of Karl Pearson and W. F. R. Weldon, which was based heavily on statistical studies of phenotype variation. The strongest opposition to this school came from William Bateson, who perhaps did the most in the early days of publicising the benefits of Mendel's theory (the word "genetics", and much of the discipline's other terminology, originated with Bateson). This debate between the biometricians and the Mendelians was extremely vigorous in the first two decades of the 20th century, with the biometricians claiming statistical and mathematical rigor, whereas the Mendelians claimed a better understanding of biology. Modern genetics shows that Mendelian heredity is, in fact, an inherently biological process, though not all genes of Mendel's experiments are yet understood.

Ultimately, the two approaches were combined, especially by work conducted by R. A. Fisher as early as 1918. The combination, in the 1930s and 1940s, of Mendelian genetics with Darwin's theory of natural selection resulted in the modern synthesis of evolutionary biology.

In the Soviet Union and the People's Republic of China, Mendelian genetics was rejected in favor of Lamarckism under the state policy of Lysenkoism, leading to imprisonment and even execution of Mendelian geneticists as well as massive famines in both of those countries.

=== Modern analysis of the genes causing Mendel's pea phenotypes ===
Mendel postulated that seven "factors" determine the features he studied in peas. These factors are called "genes" today, but the nature of these genes remained mysterious for more than a century. The effort to identify these genes lasted until 2025, when the last 3 genes were discovered. The seven genes are as follows (genes are abbreviated PsXYZ for Pisum sativum, the scientific name of the pea): the wrinkled phenotype of peas (wild-type round) is caused by an insertion in the PsSBE1 gene. The yellow phenotype (wild-type: green) is caused by an insertion or mutation in the PsSGR gene. The white phenotype of the flower colour (wild-type: purple) is caused by a deletion in the PsbHLH gene. The dwarf phenotype is caused by the PsGA3ox1 gene while the pod color phenotype (yellow vs. green) is caused by the PsChlG gene. Finally, the pod shape is determined by the PsCLE41 gene, which causes the constricted or inflated phenotypes, and the PsCIK2/3 gene causes the terminal and axial flower position.

=== Other experiments ===
Mendel also experimented with hawkweed (Hieracium). He published a report on his work with hawkweed, a group of plants of great interest to scientists at the time because of their diversity. However, the results of Mendel's inheritance study in hawkweeds were unlike those for peas; the first generation was very variable, and many of their offspring were identical to the maternal parent. In his correspondence with Carl Nägeli he discussed his results but was unable to explain them. It was not appreciated until the end of the nineteenth century that many hawkweed species were apomictic, producing most of their seeds through an asexual process.

Mendel appears to have kept animals at the monastery, breeding bees in custom-designed bee hives. None of his results on bees survived, except for a passing mention in the reports of the Moravian Apiculture Society. All that is known definitely is that he used Cyprian and Carniolan bees, which were particularly aggressive, to the annoyance of other monks and visitors of the monastery, such that he was asked to get rid of them. Mendel, on the other hand, was fond of his bees and referred to them as "my dearest little animals".

After his death, Mendel's colleagues remembered that he bred mice, crossing varieties of different sizes, although Mendel had left no record of any such work. A persistent myth has developed that Mendel turned his attention to plants only after Napp declared it unseemly for a celibate priest to closely observe rodent sex. In a 2022 biography, Daniel Fairbanks argued that Napp could hardly have given such a pronouncement, as Napp personally oversaw sheep breeding on the monastery's extensive agricultural estate.

Mendel also studied astronomy and meteorology, founding the 'Austrian Meteorological Society' in 1865. The majority of his published works were related to meteorology.

He also described novel plant species, and these are denoted with the botanical author abbreviation "Mendel".

== Mendelian paradox ==
In 1936, Ronald Fisher, a prominent statistician and population geneticist, reconstructed Mendel's experiments, analyzed results from the F_{2} (second filial) generation, and found the ratio of dominant to recessive phenotypes (e.g., yellow versus green peas; round versus wrinkled peas) to be implausibly and consistently too close to the expected ratio of 3 to 1. Fisher asserted that "the data of most, if not all, of the experiments have been falsified to agree closely with Mendel's expectations". Mendel's alleged observations, according to Fisher, were "abominable," "shocking," and "cooked."

Other scholars agree with Fisher that Mendel's various observations come uncomfortably close to Mendel's expectations. A. W. F. Edwards, for instance, remarks: "One can applaud the lucky gambler; but when he is lucky again tomorrow, and the next day, and the following day, one is entitled to become a little suspicious". Three other lines of evidence likewise lend support to the assertion that Mendel's results are indeed too good to be true.

Fisher's analysis gave rise to the Mendelian paradox: Mendel's reported data are, statistically speaking, too good to be true, yet "everything we know about Mendel suggests that he was unlikely to engage in either deliberate fraud or in an unconscious adjustment of his observations". Several writers have attempted to resolve this paradox.

One attempted explanation invokes confirmation bias. Fisher accused Mendel's experiments as "biased strongly in the direction of agreement with expectation [...] to give the theory the benefit of the doubt". In a 2004 article, J.W. Porteous concluded that Mendel's observations were indeed implausible. An explanation for Mendel's results based on tetrad pollen has been proposed, but reproduction of the experiments showed no evidence that the tetrad-pollen model explains any of the bias.

Another attempt to resolve the Mendelian paradox notes that a conflict may sometimes arise between the moral imperative of a bias-free recounting of one's factual observations and the even more important imperative of advancing scientific knowledge. Mendel might have felt compelled "to simplify his data to meet real, or feared editorial objections." Such an action could be justified on moral grounds (and hence provide a resolution to the Mendelian paradox) since the alternative—refusing to comply—might have hindered the growth of scientific knowledge. Similarly, like so many other obscure innovators of science, Mendel, a little-known innovator of working-class background, had to "break through the cognitive paradigms and social prejudices" of his audience. If such a breakthrough "could be best achieved by deliberately omitting some observations from his report and adjusting others to make them more palatable to his audience, such actions could be justified on moral grounds."

Daniel L. Hartl and Daniel J. Fairbanks reject Fisher's statistical argument outright, suggesting that Fisher incorrectly interpreted Mendel's experiments. They find it likely that Mendel scored more than ten progeny and that the results matched the expectation. They conclude: "Fisher's allegation of deliberate falsification can finally be put to rest, because on closer analysis it has proved to be unsupported by convincing evidence". In 2008 Hartl and Fairbanks (with Allan Franklin and AWF Edwards) wrote a comprehensive book in which they concluded that there were no reasons to assert Mendel fabricated his results, nor that Fisher deliberately tried to diminish Mendel's legacy. Reassessment of Fisher's statistical analysis, according to these authors, also disproves the notion of confirmation bias in Mendel's results.

== Commemoration ==
Mount Mendel in New Zealand's Paparoa Range was named after him in 1970 by the Department of Scientific and Industrial Research. In celebration of his 200th birthday, Mendel's body was exhumed and his DNA sequenced.

== See also ==
- List of Roman Catholic cleric–scientists
- Mendel Museum of Genetics
- Mendel Polar Station in Antarctica
- Mendel University in Brno
- Mendelian error
- The Gardener of God, an Italian docudrama about the life and works of Gregor Mendel
