= Hieronymus Pez =

Austrian Benedictine librarian and historian

Hieronymus Pez (24 February 1685 – 14 October 1762) was an Austrian Benedictine librarian and historian.

== Life ==
Pez was born at Ybbs. In 1703 he entered the novitiate at Melk Abbey, and was ordained in 1711. He became assistant to his brother Bernhard Pez, after whose death he became librarian. He remained at Melk until his own death.

Hieronymus Pez was also member of the first learned society in Habsburg Monarchy, the Societas eruditorum incognitorum in terris Austriacis, which was publishing the first scientific journal of the monarchy, to which Pez was also contributing.

== Works ==
His principal works are:

- Scriptores rerum Austriacarum, 1721–45, in three volumes, a collection of over one hundred sources for Austrian history
- Acta S. Colomanni (1713)
- History of St. Leopold (1746)
