= Cyril Napp =

Austrian-Czech abbot

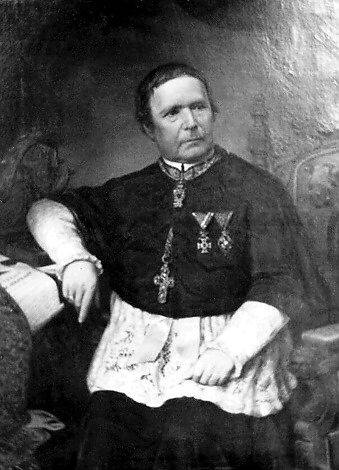

Cyril František Napp (German: Cyrill Franz Napp; 5 October 1792 – 22 July 1867) was an Austrian-Czech abbot of the Augustinian order who took an interest in education and scholarship. He took an interest in horticulture and agriculture, and encouraged the work of Gregor Mendel who succeeded him at the Brno monastery of St Thomas as abbot.

== Biography ==
Napp was born in Jevíčko where his father Ludwig was a glove maker of German origins. Napp was educated at Jevíčko before going to study philosophy at Olomouc. After graduating in 1811 he joined the Augustinian monastery in Brno and was ordained in 1815. He became a professor at the seminary in 1817 and became an abbot in 1824. He encouraged learning at the monastery and made it a centre for scholarship. He catalogued the books in the library of the monastery and conducted studies on plants in the garden of the monastery. He was also involved in encouraging the work of Gregor Mendel. In 1827 he helped establish a fire insurance company in Moravia and Silesia. He also took an interest in the politics of Moravia and contributed to the development of the technical university in Brno by influencing the Margrave of Moravia through the regional committee that he represented from 1829 to 1861. From 1865 he served as director for the Moravian-Silesian Society for the promotion of agriculture, nature and regional studies. Napp also encouraged musicians as part of the activities of the Brno choir. Although of German origins, he encouraged the Czech national revival and was an advisor to the Czech Museum in Prague.

After Napp's death, the position of abbot at the Brno monastery was taken by Gregor Mendel.
