= Nesovice =

- Municipality
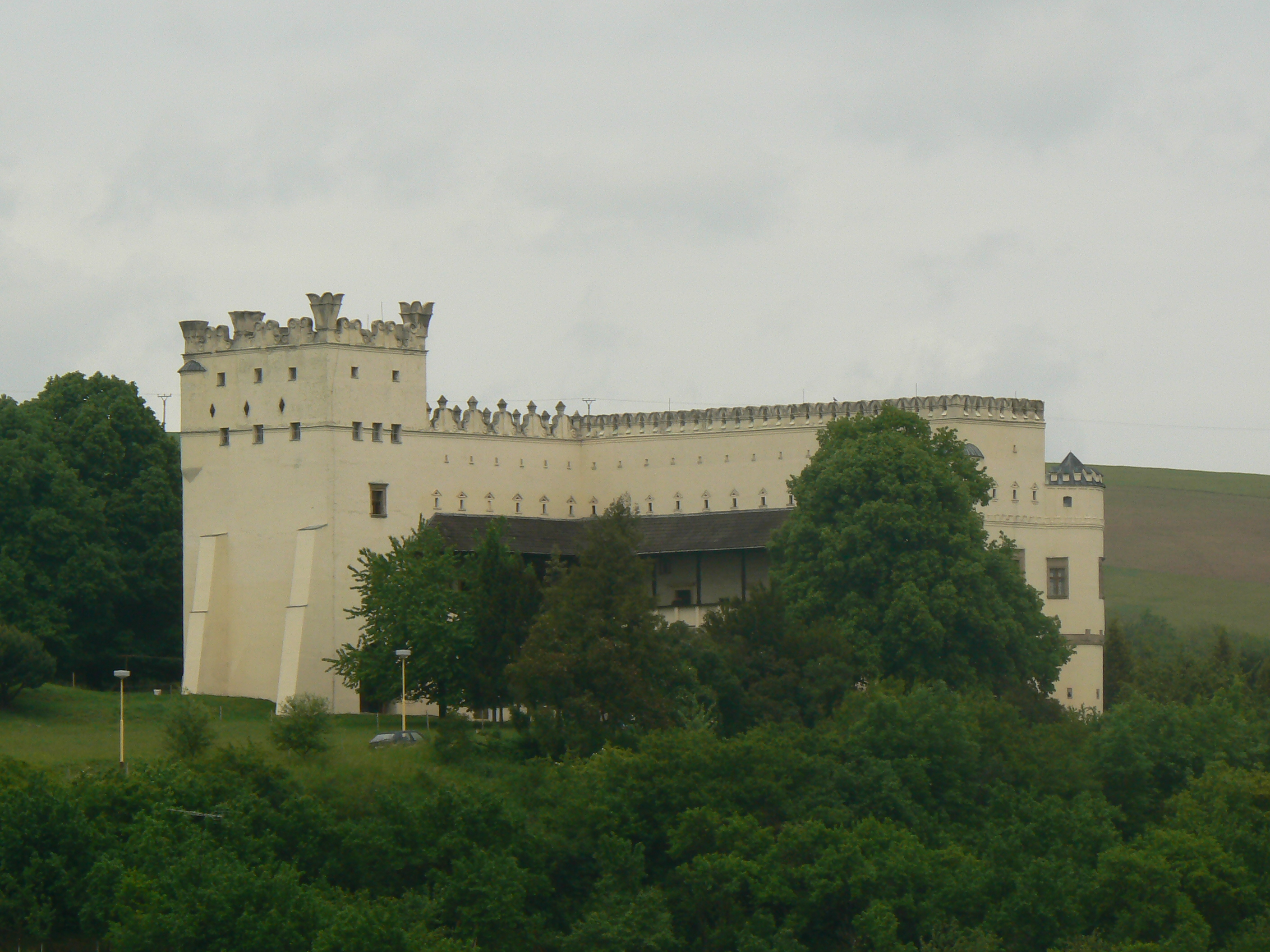
- Nové Zámky Castle

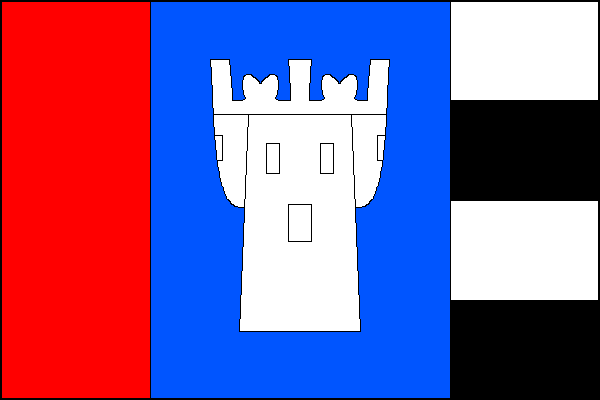
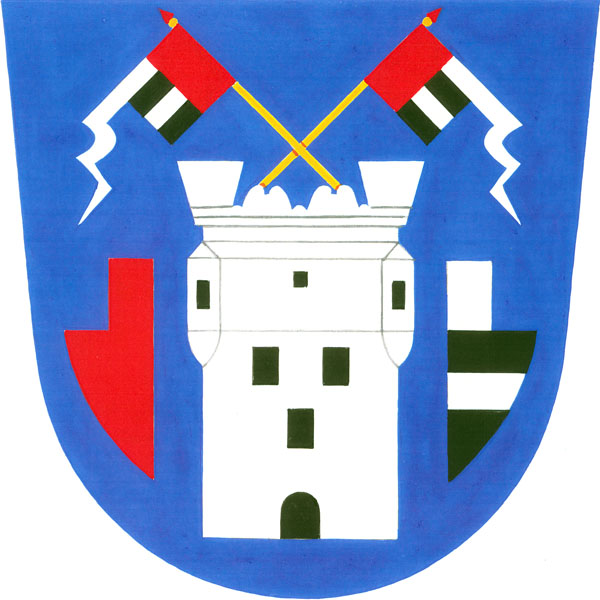
- Flag Coat of arms

- Location in the Czech Republic
- Coordinates: 49°9′4″N 17°4′51″E
- Country: Czech Republic
- Region: South Moravian
- District: Vyškov
- First mentioned: 1131

Area
  - Total: 10.27 km^{2} (3.97 sq mi)
- Elevation: 248 m (814 ft)

Population (2026-01-01)
  - Total: 1,130
  - Density: 110/km^{2} (285/sq mi)
- Time zone: UTC+1 (CET)
  - Summer (DST): UTC+2 (CEST)
- Postal code: 683 33
- Website: www.nesovice.cz

Nesovice is a municipality and village in Vyškov District in the South Moravian Region of the Czech Republic. It has about 1,100 inhabitants.

Nesovice lies approximately 16 kilometres (10 mi) south-east of Vyškov, 36 km (22 mi) east of Brno, and 219 km (136 mi) south-east of Prague.

== Administrative division ==
Nesovice consists of two municipal parts (in brackets population according to the 2021 census):

- Nesovice (718)
- Letošov (333)

== Demographics ==
Historical population
Year	Pop.	±%
1869	936	—
1880	970	+3.6%
1890	990	+2.1%
1900	1,025	+3.5%
1910	1,200	+17.1%
1921	1,296	+8.0%
1930	1,426	+10.0%
1950	1,372	−3.8%
1961	1,522	+10.9%
1970	1,363	−10.4%
1980	1,248	−8.4%
1991	1,191	−4.6%
2001	1,124	−5.6%
2011	1,111	−1.2%
2021	1,051	−5.4%
Source: Censuses

== Notable people ==
- Joseph von Petrasch (1714–1772), scholar and writer; lived and died here
