= Kryštof Josef Hollandt =

Czech lawyer and university educator (died 1713)

- Died: 1713
- Education: University of Olomouc; University of Vienna; Charles University
- Known for: Author of Examen Iuridicum
- Scientific career
- Fields: Law
- Workplaces: University of Olomouc
- Doctoral advisor: Schambogen

Kryštof Josef Hollandt (died 1713) was a Moravian lawyer and professor of law at the University of Olomouc during the years 1695 to 1707, and author of a commentary on the Institutes of Justinian.

Kryštof Josef Hollandt graduated from the Faculty of Philosophy of the University of Olomouc and the faculties of law of University of Vienna and Charles University.

He became Professor of Law at the University of Olomouc in 1695. Unlike his predecessors, who taught only secular law, he started teaching also canon law. The Jesuits, who were leading the university at the time, however considered canon law as their own domain and filed a protest with the emperor. Consequently, in 1696, the emperor Leopold I issued a Decree authorizing the lectures of canon law by Hollandt (however, this covered only the lectures of canon law to the law students, the theology students continued to have separate lectures of canon law at the Faculty of Theology until 1771).

Hollandt had to leave the post in 1707 due to mental illness. Despite that, Hollandt managed to publish his own commentary on the Institutiones named Examen iuridicum in Olomouc in 1711.

== See also ==
- Karel Ferdinand Irmler
- Johann Heinrich Bösenselle
- Josef Vratislav Monse
