= Franz Samuel Karpe =

Slovenian philosopher

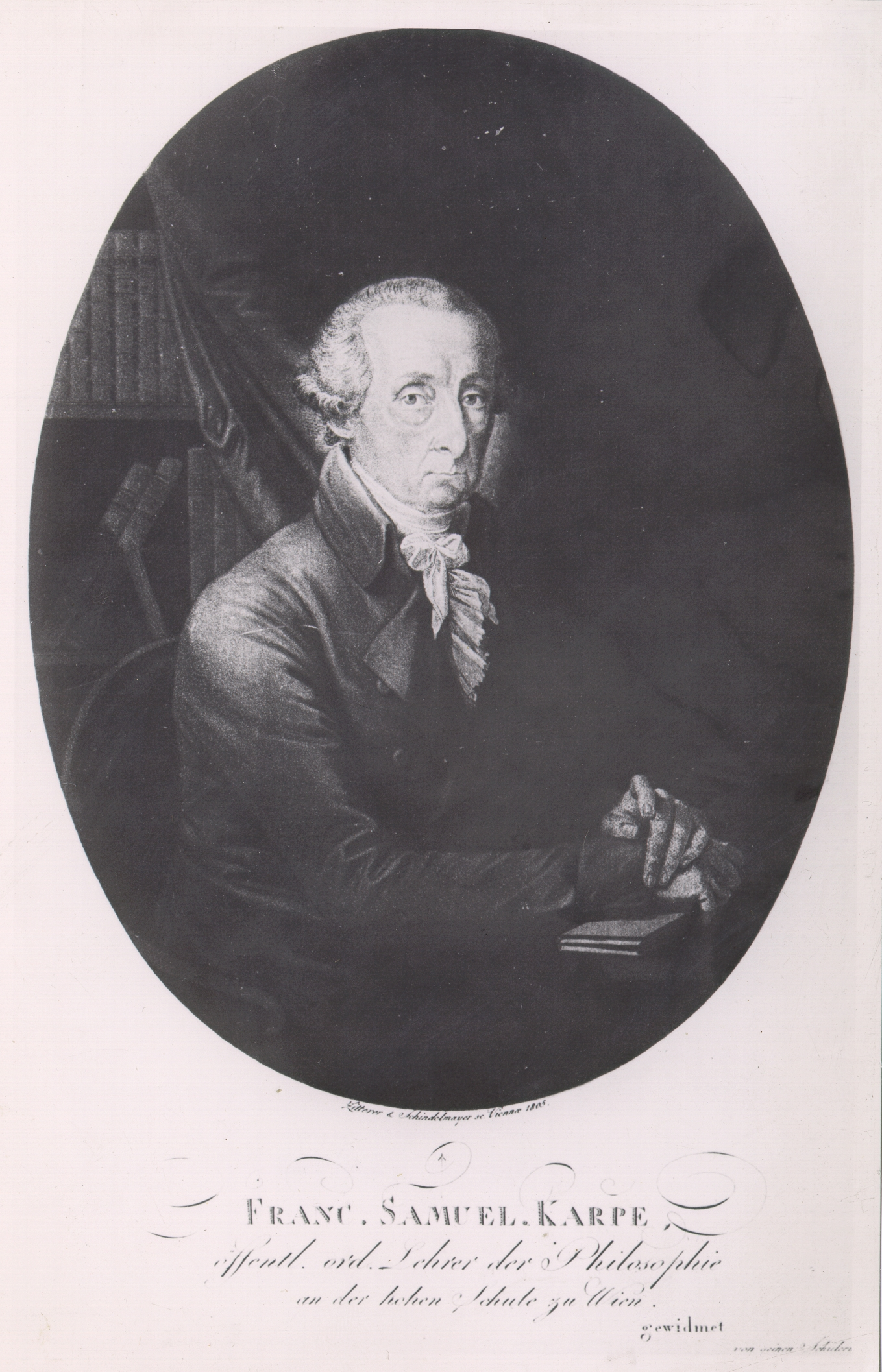
- Born: 17 November 1747; Kranj, Duchy of Carniola (today Slovenia)
- Died: 4 September 1806 (aged 58); Vienna, Austria
- Education: University of Vienna
- Scientific career
- Fields: Philosophy
- Workplaces: University of Olomouc; University of Vienna

Franz Samuel Karpe, Slovene: Franc Samuel Karpe, Czech: František Samuel Karpe (17 November 1747 – 4 September 1806) was a Slovenian philosopher and rector of University of Olomouc.

== Biography ==
Karpe was born in Kranj, Carniola (nowadays Slovenia), to a townsman's family. His parents died soon and subsequently Count Lichteberg's family assumed responsibility for his upbringing and education. Karpe entered a Jesuit college in Ljubljana, which he finished in 1768.

In 1769 Karpe moved to Vienna, where he studied law and philosophy. He graduated university in 1773. One year later Karpe assumed position of professor of logic, metaphysics and moral philosophy at the University of Olomouc. In 1777 he became the director of Faculty of Philosophy with pay of 600 florins a year (for comparison, professor of law Josef Vratislav Monse was paid 900). At the same time he was also assessor at the university's Academic Court.

The University was relocated to Brno from 1778 to 1782. In Brno, Karpe taught also pedagogy. In 1781 Karpe became the university's Rector.

Karpe was ardent admirer of Leibniz and Wolff, but a critic of Kant and advocate of deism and empiricism following Locke. He was one of the few philosophers of the era, who were allowed to be published by the censors of the Vienna court's study commission.

In 1786 Karpe became professor of philosophy at University of Vienna, where he remained until his death in 1806. He taught his students in the spirit of Ruđer Bošković and strongly criticised Bošković's opponent Immanuel Kant.

== Main works ==
Karpe's works can be divided into Olomouc and Vienna period.

- Argumentum tentaminis, ex philosophia rationali in conspectu tabellari exhititum, Olomouc 1776
- Filum tentaminis, ex philosophia speculativa, Olomouc 1776
- Erklärung der Logik, Metaphysik und praktischen Philosophie nach Feders Leitfaden, Vienna 1793
- Darstellung der Philosophie ohne Beinamen in einem Lehrbegriffe als Leitfaden bei der Anleitung zum liberalen Philosophieren, Vienna 1802 - 1803 (The work consists of three fascicles about theory of philosophy (psychology, logics, metaphysics) and three fascicles about practical philosophy (general practical philosophy, moral philosophy - ethics, legal philosophy))
- Institutiones philosophiae dogmaticae perpetua Kantianae disciplinae ratione habita, Vienna 1804 (Latin version of the theory of philosophy)
- Institutiones philosophiae moralis, Vienna 1804 (Latin version of the practical philosophy)

== See also ==
- Josef Vratislav Monse
