= Oliver Legipont =

German Benedictine bibliographer

Oliver Legipont (2 December 1698, at Soiron, Limburg – 16 January 1758, at Trier) was a German Benedictine bibliographer.

== Life ==
Having received his early education from the Franciscans at Verviers, he proceeded for higher studies to Cologne. There he entered the abbey of Great St. Martin, received the priesthood on 22 May 1723, and took the degree of Licentiate in 1728.

He was commissioned to examine and put in order numerous libraries. His life was practically a succession of journeys, from one library to another.

He was instrumental in the erection of a Benedictine college in the University of Heidelberg.

Oliver Legipont was also member of the first learned society in Habsburg Monarchy, the Societas eruditorum incognitorum in terris Austriacis, which was publishing the first scientific journal of the monarchy, to which Legipont was also contributing.

== Works ==
Most of his writings remained unedited. Among the printed works are:

- his edition of Magnoald Ziegelbauer's "Historia rei litterariæ ord. Sti. Benedicti" (1754-);
- "Monasticum Moguntiacum" (Prague, 1746);
- "Dissertationes philologico-bibliographicæ" (Nuremberg, 1747),
- "Itinerarium peregrinationis nobilis" (Augsburg, 1751; the same also in Spanish, Valencia, 1759).
