= Johann Heinrich Bösenselle =

German lawyer and academic (died 1767)

- Born: Westphalia
- Died: 18 September 1767; Olomouc
- Known for: The first secular Rector of University of Olomouc
- Scientific career
- Fields: International and natural law
- Workplaces: University of Olomouc

Johann Heinrich Bösenselle, Czech: Jindřich Antonín Boesenselle, Latin: Henricus Antonius Bösenselle, was a lawyer, professor of law and Rector of the University of Olomouc.

Originally from Westphalia, Johann Heinrich Bösenselle assumed position of professor of law at University of Olomouc in 1751. Bösenselle, together with Professor of Law Josef Antonín Sommer (German: Joseph Anton Sommer), strived to enhance quality of Olomouc law school. The lectures were extended to cover international, public and natural law, taught according to Grotius and Vitoria. Bösenselle was also lecturing history of Imperii Romano-Germanici according to Johann Jacob Mascov. In 1755 the study of law was extended to 3 years (while it was taking place 10 months a year).

From the 1750s there was a power struggle raging between the empress Maria Theresa and jesuits over control of the university. The university was controlled by the Jesuit order from its establishment in 1573, and the position of university's Rector Magnificus was automatically in the hands of the rector of Jesuit order. Firstly, the Empress took away the Jesuit's monopoly over the position by imposing that the Rector Magnificus was to be elected by academia. As a theologian was elected Rector Magnificus in 1765, the empress assumed the power and appointed her own favourite, Johann Heinrich Bösenselle, as the head of university in 1766.

== See also ==
- Karel Ferdinand Irmler
- Kryštof Josef Hollandt
- Josef Vratislav Monse
