= Friedrich Franz =

- Born: 1 December 1783; Vysoké Veselí, Bohemia, Austrian Empire
- Died: 4 December 1860 (aged 64); Nová Říše, Moravia, Austrian Empire
- Education: Charles University
- Scientific career
- Workplaces: University of Olomouc

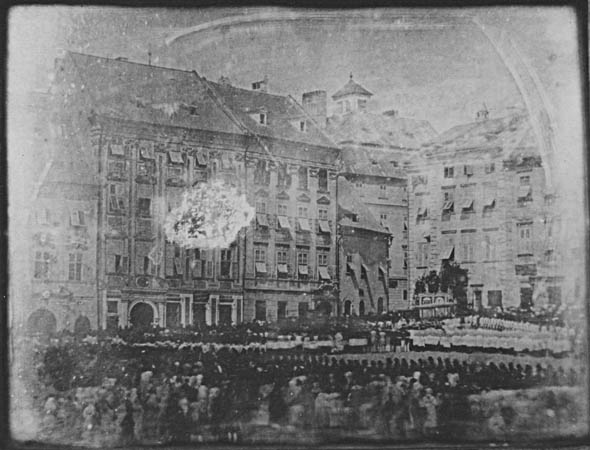
Franz is believed to be the author of picture "Corpus Christi" taken in Brno on 10 June 1841, which is the first reportage photography in the Czech lands.

Friedrich Franz (Czech: Bedřich Franz; 1 December 1783 – 4 December 1860) was a German Bohemian physicist. He was a professor of physics and applied mathematics at the Faculty of Philosophy of University of Olomouc, where he greatly influenced his student Gregor Johann Mendel, later known as "The Father of Genetics".

== Biography ==
Friedrich Franz graduated in 1831 the University of Prague as Doctor of Philosophy and Liberal Arts. Before he came in 1842 to Olomouc, he taught physics at a philosophical institute (type of grammar school) in Brno (Brünn).

Franz was the first lecturer on the daguerreotype process in Moravia. He started experimenting already in 1839, the same year that Louis Daguerre developed this method of taking photographs.

He also arranged exhibitions. The fact that this photographic process took roots in Moravia is attributable to him. Franz is believed to be the author of photography of "Corpus Christi" taken in Brno on 10 June 1841, which is the first reportage photography in the Czech lands and one of the first photographies worldwide. He is also believed to be the author of the first portrait photos in the Czech lands. In 1841 he made photo portraits of Brno Bishop František Antonín Gindl.

In Olomouc, Gregor Johann Mendel was one of the most favourite Franz's students. Franz immediately recognized his great talent, and they soon became good friends. They debated a number of topics, such as the origin of the Solar System and of life as such, the development of Goethe's philosophy and the purpose of human life. Franz also provided the newest scientific literature to Mendel and recommended him to enter the St Thomas's Abbey, where Mendel later defined his famous laws of inheritance.

In 1844 Franz became the dean of the Faculty of Philosophy. After the Austrian government dissolved the Olomouc Faculty of Philosophy following the students' and professors' participation on 1848 revolution, Franz became briefly the rector of the University in 1852, before he left and became a director of a grammar school in Salzburg, while later he was a Premonstratensian prelate in Nová Říše (Neureisch).

== See also ==
- Johann Karl Nestler
