= Karel Ferdinand Irmler =

Czech lawyer and university educator (born 1650)

- Born: 18 March 1650; Olomouc, Moravia, Kingdom of Bohemia
- Died: Unknown; Olomouc ?
- Education: Charles University
- Known for: First professor of secular law at University of Olomouc
- Scientific career
- Fields: Law
- Workplaces: University of Olomouc
- Doctoral advisor: Malanot

Karel Ferdinand Irmler (born 18 March 1650, date of death unknown) was a Moravian lawyer and the first professor of secular law at University of Olomouc.

Irmler was born in Olomouc to a family of a local physician. He studied at the Faculty of Philosophy of University of Olomouc and Law at the University of Prague, where he defended his dissertation in 1674 and 1675. Since 1678 he was privately teaching law in Vienna.

He became the first professor of law at the University of Olomouc, giving the first lecture at eight in the morning on 3 January 1679 to six students.

The Moravian nobility forced the establishment of the Professorate of Law through a decree of Emperor Leopold I despite the opposition of Jesuits, who were in charge of the University. Irmler was paid 150 florins a year directly by the nobility and was obliged to teach only students immatriculated (enrolled) at the University. As Jesuits opposed the secular law lectures, he was forced to give lectures in his house. He held the post of professor of law until 1691. Late in his life, he was blind.

== See also ==
- Kryštof Josef Hollandt
- Johann Heinrich Bösenselle
- Josef Vratislav Monse
