= Johann Karl Nestler =

Czech biologist, forester and naturescientist (1783–1842)

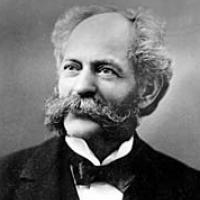
- Born: 16 December 1783; Würbenthal, Silesia, Crown of Bohemia, current Czech Republic
- Died: 9 July 1842 (aged 44); Olomouc, Moravia, Austrian Empire
- Education: University of Olomouc; University of Vienna
- Scientific career
- Fields: Genetics
- Workplaces: University of Olomouc

Johann Karl Nestler, Czech: Jan Karel Nestler (16 December 1783 – 9 July 1842) was an Austrian-Czech scientist in the field of hereditary traits, professor of natural history and agriculture at the Philosophical Faculty of University of Olomouc, dean of the faculty and rector of the university, and doyen of the Czech agriculture science.

== Biography ==
Nestler studied philosophy, theology and law in years 1800–06 at the Olomouc Academical Lyceum (the University of Olomouc was degraded to academical lyceum in 1782–1826). Then in years 1806–12 he was an educator in Althart / Staré Hobzí and in years 1812–18 he was a director of a high school in Klafterbrunn, Lower Austria. In years 1818–20 he received technical education in agriculture. He studied agriculture at the University of Vienna in years 1820–21, where he later also worked as adjunct at the Department of Agriculture.

In year 1823 Nestler became the professor of agriculture, and in 1824 also of natural history, at the Academy of Nobility and at the academical lyceum in Olomouc. After the lyceum was restored to University status, Nestler obtained Doctorate of Philosophy. In 1835 he became the rector of the university and in 1837 he became the dean of its Faculty of Philosophy.

The history of science forces us to think more than science alone can reveal.

— 1831

During his teaching Nestler included a special section dealing with scientific animal and plant breeding. His main emphasis was on sheep breeding to improve wool protection for the benefit of the textile industry. In his published lectures Nestler (1829) encouraged sheep breeders to elaborate the theoretical basis of the selection process. Nestler also tried to explain how nature produces new species of animals and plants through forces beyond the hand of man and how breeders control the reproductive process and use modifications, such as inbreeding or outcrossing, for increased production.

Through the examination of the registers of the best stock animals and their offspring Nestler hoped to explain the German: Vererbungsgeschichte (genetic history). Examination of the records of the ancestors of the best breeding animals, called by Nestler developmental history (German: Entwicklunggeschichte) was for him the reverse side of the same coin. According to Wood and Orel the search for rules of heredity in sheep created an atmosphere of enquiry about heredity in general, which had influence on later work of Gregor Johann Mendel, himself a student at the Faculty of Philosophy in 1840–43.

Nestler was also a very active member of the Moravian-Silesian Society for Advancement of Agriculture (German: Mähr.-Schles. Ges. zur Beförderung des Ackerbaues, Natur- und Landeskde., in which he, among other things, organized the 4th International Congress of Farmers and Foresters (1st time in the lands under control of Austrian Habsburgs) in Brno in 1840. He was also member of many similarly oriented associations and wrote a lot of literature on the topic.

== Main works ==
- Magazine Mittheilungen der k. k. Mährisch-Schlesischen Gesellschaft zur Beförderung des Ackerbaues, der Natur- und Landeskunde in Brünn. Many contributions since 1825, scientifically especially important is article "Neues aus alter Zeit" (Vol. 20, 1831, p. 71-72), in which he pleads to farmers to scrutinize breeding
- Ueber Auswahl, Bereitung und Anwendung der Düngerstoffe nach Lage, Boden und Gegenständen der landwirthschaftlichen Kultur: gekrönte Preisschrift. Brno, 1835.
- Mittheilungen über die zweckmäßigste Aufbewahrung von Nahrungsmitteln für Menschen und Hausthiere: zwei von der k.k. mährisch-schlesischen Gesellschaft zur Beförderung des Ackerbaues, der Natur- und Landeskunde gekrönte Preisschriften 1840
- Amts-Bericht des Vorstandes über die vierte, zu Brünn vom 20. bis 28. September 1840 abgehaltene Versammlung der deutschen Land- und Forstwirthe. Olomouc, 1841.

== See also ==
- Friedrich Franz
