= Maximilian Ziegelbauer =

German Catholic prelate

- Titular bishop of Lapda
- Church: Roman Catholic Church
- See: Titular see of Lapda
- In office: 1983 – 2016
- Predecessor: Sabin-Marie Saint-Gaudens
- Successor: current
- Previous post: Auxiliary Bishop

Orders
- Ordination: 21 May 1950
- Consecration: 22 October 1983

Personal details
- Born: 6 September 1923 Memmingen, Germany
- Died: 21 November 2016 (aged 93) Memmingen, Germany
- Coat of arms

Maximilian Ziegelbauer (6 September 1923 – 21 November 2016) was a German prelate of the Catholic Church. Ziegelbauer was born in Memmingen, Germany, and was ordained a priest on 21 May 1950. He was appointed auxiliary bishop of the Augsburg Diocese on 2 August 1983 as well as titular bishop of Lapda, and consecrated on 22 October 1983. Ziegelbauer retired from the Augsburg diocese on 7 September 1998.
