= Josef Vratislav Monse =

Czech historian and lawyer (1733–1793)

- Born: June 15, 1733; Nové Město na Moravě, Moravia
- Died: February 6, 1793 (aged 59); Olomouc, Moravia
- Education: Charles University; University of Vienna
- Scientific career
- Fields: Law, state theory, history, Czech language
- Workplaces: University of Olomouc
- Doctoral advisor: Paul Joseph von Riegger

Josef Vratislav Monse (June 15, 1733 – February 6, 1793) was a Moravian lawyer and historian.

He was a leading enlightenment figure in the Habsburg monarchy and an early exponent of the Moravian Revival in Moravia. Monse played a key role in the development of modern Moravian historiography. He was a professor of law and, in 1780, the rector at the University of Olomouc.

== Biography ==
=== Early life, studies in Prague and Vienna ===
Josef Vít Monse was the eighth of nine children born into the family of a municipal legal official in the Vysočina Region. His parents were Johann Karl Monse and Anna Monse (née Moudrá). The family lived at house number eight on the main square at Nové Město na Moravě (German: Neustadtl in Mähren). Josef Monse attended the local school. When Monse was 14, his father died. His uncle, a local priest also named Josef Monse, sent him to study at a Jesuit gymnasium (school) in Telč. He covered the (normally) six year high school curriculum in four years and then, in 1752 he left for Prague, where he studied at the Faculty of Philosophy of Charles University, gaining a master's degree.

By this time Monse was becoming interested in the history of his own nation, which, since the Battle of White Mountain back in 1620, had been subjected to Catholicisation and Germanisation, while the Czech language had become no more than a means of communication between the peasants.

Monse left Prague for Vienna, where he attended the Faculty of Law at the University of Vienna and obtained a doctorate "juris utriusque" (of both civil and canon law) in 1762. While still in Vienna, Monse published his dissertation (in Latin), married Marie Anna and mastered Italian.

=== Professor of law at University of Olomouc ===
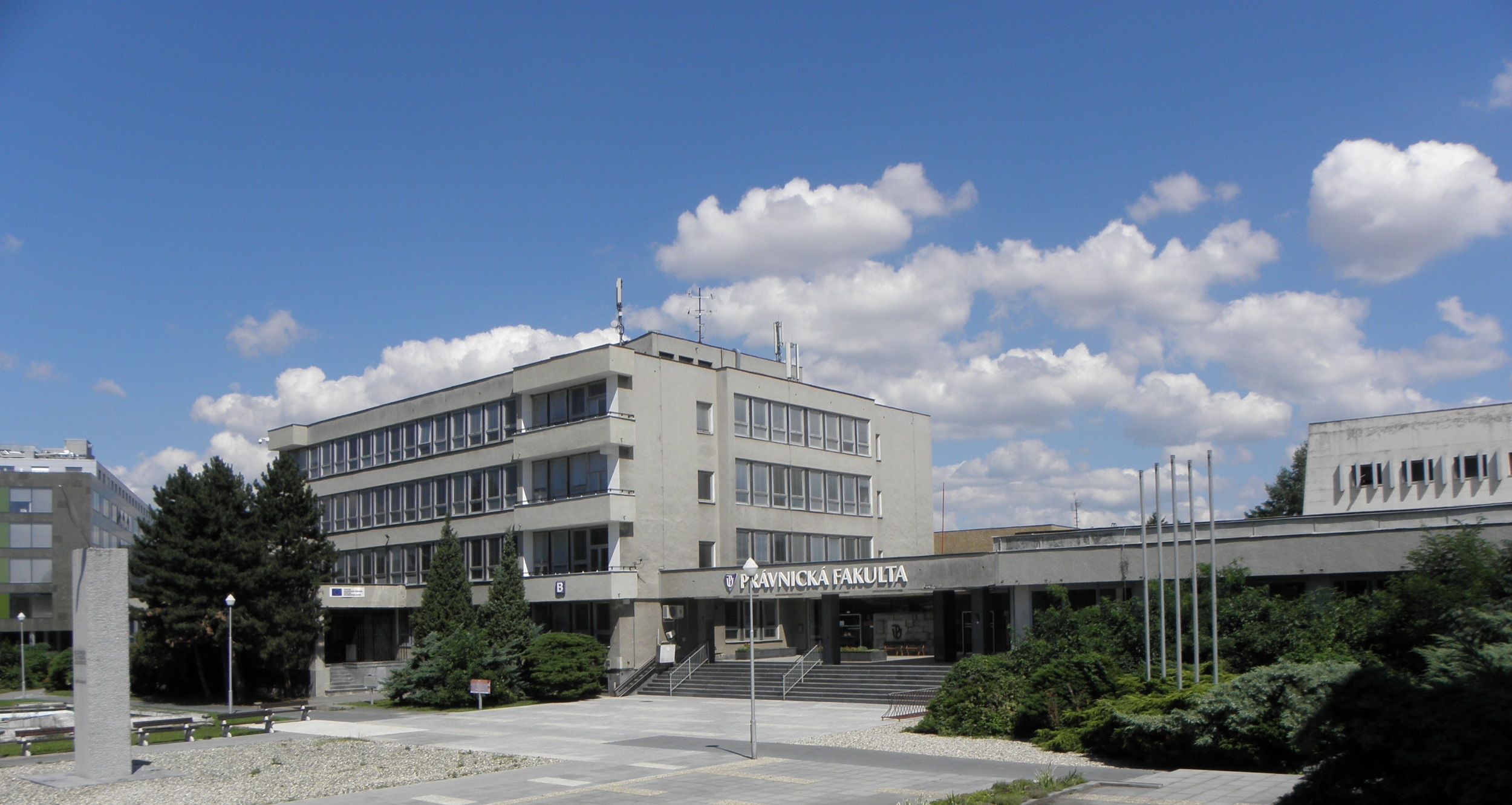
University of Olomouc Faculty of Law holds annual conference named after Monse, the Monse's Olomouc Law Days

In 1764 Monse moved to Olomouc, where he became an advocate. In 1768 he was appointed a professor of law at the University of Olomouc for which he received 900 florins a year, lecturing on public and natural law. He still also found time to continue with his advocacy work.

After Professor Josef Antonín Sommer, died in 1774, Monse added to his responsibilities Sommer's courses on Roman and Canon law. 1774 was also the year in which he changed his middle name from Vít to Vratislav, a determined reflection of his "motto": "Return the Old Glory to the Homeland!" (Czech: Vraťte starou slávu otčině!).

The lectures on Canon law for theology students were given separately at the Faculty of Theology until 1771, after which they started to be officially taught by the secular professors of law. Classes normally comprised some 50 law students, but for Monse's Canon law classes, some 300 theology students of theology also took to attending. By this time Monse had become a fierce proponent of the newly developing enlightenment ideals. In his lectures he defended the reforms of Joseph II. While the traditional theologians were merely resentful of to his spoken lectures, the publication of his ideas evoked real outrage. The Catholics leadership incited the town's poor against Monse, spreading malicious gossip that the altar-bread fell out of his mouth during Communion, and that the burning of a nearby village represented God's punishment for Monse's teachings.

The theologians' fury peaked when Monse published the work of an anonymous 13th century French author entitled in Latin: Dialogus inter clericum et militem supra dignitate papali et regia, a dialogue between a priest and a soldier discussing the relative status of popes and of kings. The treatise was found by one of the Monse's former students in a library at Znojmo monastery. He sent the work to Monse, who translated it, adding an introduction and commentary while preserving the original content, and published it. Well aware that the ideas in the thesis were still controversial even 500 years after they had first been written, he added at the end of the book that it was published with the best of intentions, and "not to irritate". That did not help much. Monse received harsh criticism not only from Olomouc, but also from Prague and Vienna, and came close to being ousted from the University. Monse's advocacy of the suppression of church institutions in favour of the secular state was nevertheless welcomed at the royal court, and he was able to retain the professorship of secular law, but was nonetheless prevented from giving lectures on canon law.

Despite the dissolution of the Jesuit order in 1773, the Catholics maintained a strong grip over the University of Olomouc. In the second half of the 1770s some shortcomings by the University management were uncovered, which was used by the emperor as pretext to move the University beyond the reach of the church at Olomouc, and the university was for a few years, until 1782, relocated to Brno. At the same time as this relocation the Directorate of Law was established (replacing the previously existing Professorate of Law) and Monse became its head. However Monse was not able now to continue with his advocacy career. In Brno Monse started to publish works about history of Moravia, this time in German.

=== Rector of the University, elevation to noble status ===
In 1780 Monse was appointed Rector of the University; he gave his inauguration speech on the history of Moravia. He was also elevated to noble status (together with his family) on December 1, 1780. Despite these achievements, or maybe because of them, Monse remained the main target of catholic reaction. In the same year Monse started the lectures about Moravian history according to Czech: Kniha Tovačovská (English: The Book of Tovačov) written by Ctibor Tovačovský z Cimburka in the 1490s. He also started writing his own history of Moravia, although this work only reaches to 1306.

Monse became a member of the learned societies of Hesse-Homburg (1780), Burghausen (1782) and Prague (1785). (He was lawyer-member in the first two societies, and a historian-member of the Prague society.) He was also in frequent contact with other figures of enlightenment in Habsburg monarchy, such as Riegger and Josef Dobrovský and many others.

In 1782 the first Archbishop of Olomouc Antonín Theodor Colloredo-Waldsee enforced relocation of the University back to Olomouc by decree of Emperor Joseph II. At the same time the institution lost its university status, becoming a mere three-year Lyceum. The Emperor had decided to retain only three universities, in Prague, Vienna, and Lviv. The Collegium Nobilium was also dissolved by the emperor. Back in Olomouc, Monse started publishing in Czech (Moravian) language. At the same time Monse insisted upon the establishment of a Department of National (=Moravian) Law and History: however this department lasted only until 1786, when it was dissolved. Meanwhile, in 1784, the Directorate of Law became Faculty of Law.

Monse's health was by now deteriorating and he ceased lecturing in 1792.

The persisting issues with the catholic reaction as well as his health problems led to a reduction in Monse's publishing activity. He died in Olomouc on February 6, 1793. With his death the lectures on Moravian law and history also ended.

== Legacy ==
Through his interest in both Moravian humanism and Benedictine historiography Monse linked the earlier Societas eruditorum incognitorum in terris Austriacis in Olomouc with the Société patriotique in Brno. The record of his lectures demonstrates an increasing willingness to link the early Enlightenment claims made on behalf of natural law with an appreciation of the virtues of the historical law of Moravia. This reveals the influence both of a critical historical perception and of the judicial theory of the renowned jurist, Joseph von Sonnenfels. Monse also saw the need for an ideological basis capable of uniting the new educated middle class with the Enlightened intelligentsia's interest in the arts and sciences. He found such a basis in critical historiography, and eventually created the platform for a Moravian patriotic revival, enriched by historical Renaissance humanism.

=== Main works ===
- (in Latin) Tabula juris publici marchionatus Moraviae ("Catalogue of public law of March of Moravia"), Olomouc 1776
- (in Latin) Dissertatio Suppeditata ad historiam litterariam Moraviae ("Brief treatise about literary history of Moravia"), Olomouc 1777
- (in Latin) Infulae doctae Moraviae ("Learned bishops of Moravia"), Brno 1779
- (in German) Geschichte des Schulwesens in Mähren ("History of education in Moravia"), 1780
- (in German) Versuch einer kurzgefassten politischen Landesgeschichte des Markgrafthums Mähren ("Brief political history of March of Moravia"), Olomouc 1783
- (in German) Leitfaden über die Vorlesungen der Landesgesetze des Markgrafthums Mähren ("Textbook to the laws of March of Moravia"), Olomouc 1783
- (in Czech) Cadet de Vaux, Ponawržení prostředkůw k umenšení nezdrawí takowých příbytkůw, které rozwodnění podrobené byly (translation; about sanitizing houses after flood) Olomouc 1785
- (in Czech) Karl von Eckartshausen, Odkryté Tagnosti Cžarodegnjckých Kunsstů k Weystraze a Wyvčowánj obecnjho Lidu o Powěrách a sskodliwých Bludech Sepsané w německé Ržeči od Pána z Eckartshausen. Do morawskýho Gazyka přeložil Vpřjmný Milownjk swé Wlasti (translation; about witches, superstitions, etc.), Olomouc 1792

== See also ==
- Karel Ferdinand Irmler
- Kryštof Josef Hollandt
- Johann Heinrich Bösenselle
- Societas eruditorum incognitorum in terris Austriacis
