= Angelo Maria Querini =

Italian Cardinal of the Roman Catholic Church

His Eminence Angelo Maria Querini
- Cardinal-Priest of Santa Prassede
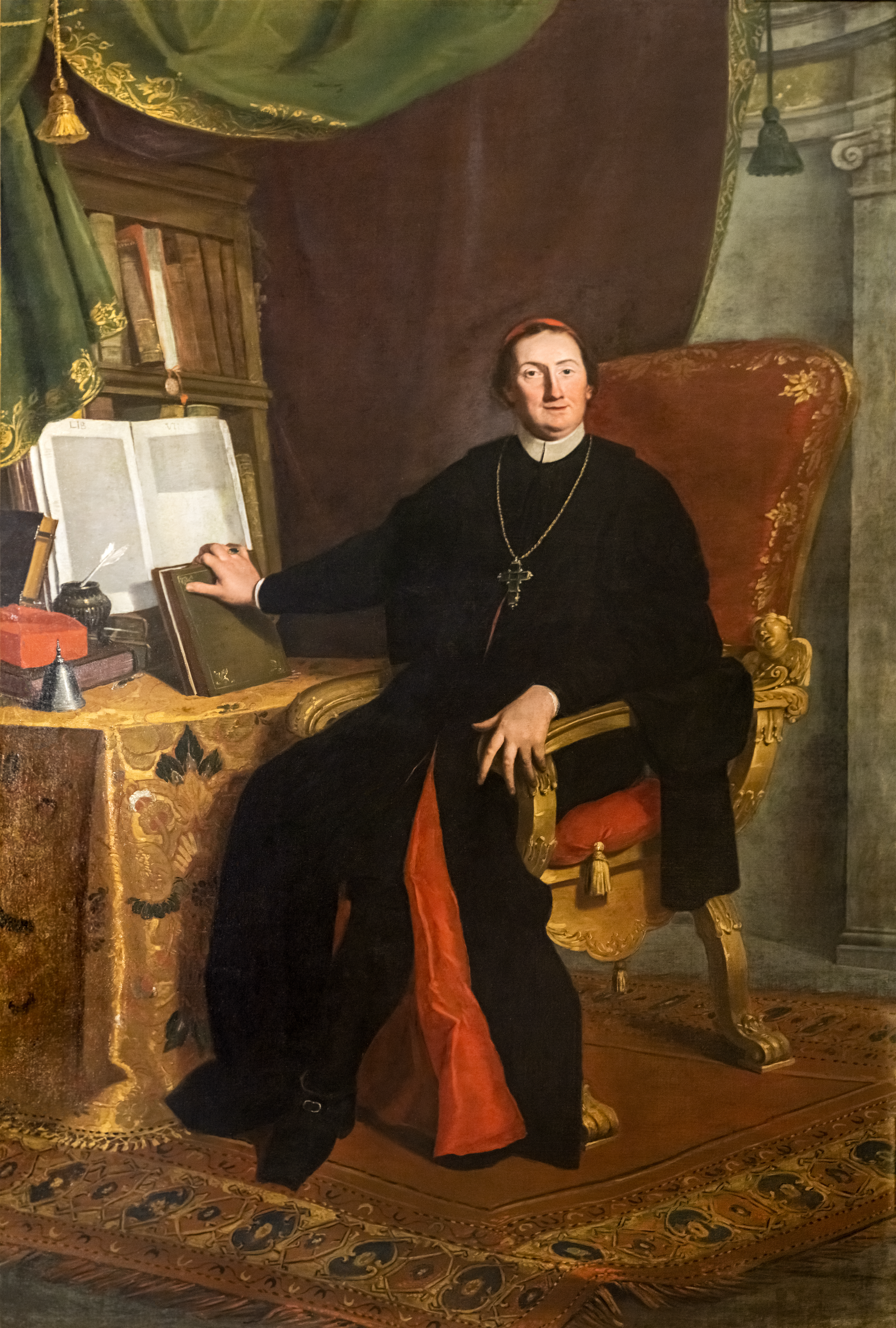
- Portrait of Cardinal Angelo Maria Querini by Bartolomeo Nazari
- Church: Catholic Church
- Diocese: Diocese of Rome
- In office: 1726–1755
- Predecessor: Luis Antonio Belluga y Moncada
- Successor: Domenico Silvio Passionei

Orders
- Created cardinal: 9 December 1726 by Pope Benedict XIII
- Rank: Cardinal-Priest

Personal details
- Born: Girolamo Querini; March 30, 1680 Brescia, Republic of Venice
- Died: 6 January 1755 (aged 74) Venice, Republic of Venice
- Buried: New Cathedral, Brescia
- Parents: Paolo di Girolamo Querini; Cecilia Giustinian
- Coat of arms

Angelo Maria Querini or Quirini (30 March 1680 – 6 January 1755) was an Italian Cardinal of the Roman Catholic Church.

== Biography ==
Born in Venice, he entered the Benedictine Order in Florence in 1695 and was ordained in 1702. From 1710 to 1714, he undertook extended educational journeys through England, France, Germany, and the Netherlands and corresponded or even met with eminent scholars of his time such as Bernard de Montfaucon, Isaac Newton, or Voltaire. Upon his return to Italy, he was made abbot of the Benedictine monastery in Rome and charged with compiling the annals of the order.

In 1723, he was elected Archbishop of Corfu. Pope Benedict XIII created him Cardinal in pectore in 1726; he was installed as Cardinal and bishop of Brescia a year later. In 1730, he became the head librarian of the Vatican Library. In 1747/48, he again went on a journey through Switzerland and Bavaria. In these years, he also became a member of the Academies of Sciences of Berlin, Vienna, and Russia, and was member of the first learned society of Habsburg Monarchy, the Societas eruditorum incognitorum in terris Austriacis.

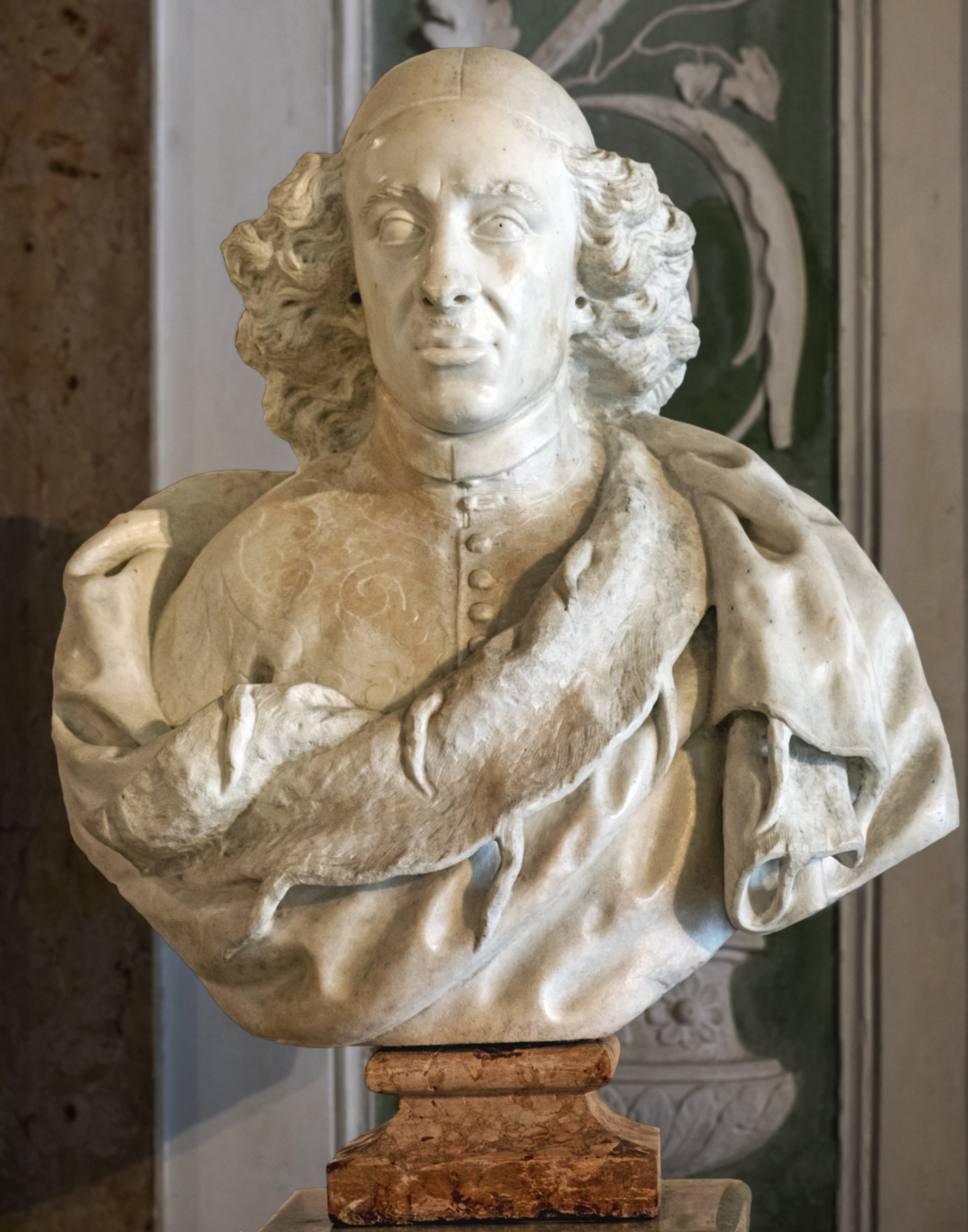
Angelo Maria Querini by Giacomo Cassetti

He had increasing differences with Pope Benedict XIV, though, such as over the assignment of Cardinal Passionei as pro-librarian and the pope's position in a conflict with Venice. Ultimately, these differences aggravated and led to his being sent back to his diocese in Brescia, where he died a few years later.

Quirini's writings include many works on the history of the Church, of Corfu, and of Brescia, as well as a five-volume edition of the correspondence of Cardinal Reginald Pole. In Brescia, he founded in 1745 the Biblioteca Queriniana, which still exists today, and he sponsored the German missions. He also financed the completion of the St. Hedwig Church in Berlin, which is today the cathedral of the archbishopric of Berlin.

== Works ==
- Angelo Maria Quirini (1739), Specimen variae literaturae quae in urbe Brixia ejusque ditione paulo post typographiae incunabula florebat (Pars Prima: Poetas latino Aurea et Argenteae Aetatis ed.), Brescia: J.-M. Rizzardi, OCLC 13598367, OL 6934498M
- Cardinal Angelo Maria Quirini (1739), Specimen varae literaturae quae in urbe Brixia ejusque ditione paulo post Typographiae Incunabula Florebat, Pars Secunda: Grammatica, Oratoria, Poetica, Philosophica, Complectitur, Brescia: Ex. typ. Giovanni Maria Rizzardi
- Angelo Maria Quirini (1749), Commentarii de rebus pertinentibus ad Ang. Mar. cardinalem Quirinum, Brescia: Ex. typ. Gian-Maria Rizzardi, OL 1621998M
- Cardinal Angelo Maria Quirini (1747), Atti spettanti alla fondazione, e dotazione della Biblioteca Quiriniana a pubblico benefizio eretta in Brescia., Brescia: Ex. typ. Gian-Maria Rizzardi
- Cardinal Angelo Maria Quirini (1748), Epistola: ad eminentissimum et reverendissimum Dominum Thomam Philippum, Cardinal de Alsatia, Archiepiscopum Mechliniensem Belgiique Primatem., Brescia
- Cardinal Angelo Maria Quirini (1752). "De Herculaneo Epistola". In Antonio Francesco Gori (ed.). Admiranda antiquitatum Herculanensium descripta et illustrata. Rome: ex Typographio Palladis ad Theatrum Pompei. p. VII-XVIII.
- Cardinal Angelo Maria Quirini (1717), Enchiridion graecorum quod de illorum dogmatibus post schismatis epocham Rom ., Bres: Beneventi Ex Typographia Archiepiscopali

== Bibliography ==
- Johannes Madey (1999). "Quirini (Querini), Angelo Maria". In Bautz, Traugott (ed.). Biographisch-Bibliographisches Kirchenlexikon (BBKL) (in German). Vol. 16. Herzberg: Bautz. cols. 1305–1307. ISBN 3-88309-079-4.
- Miranda, Salvador. "QUIRINI, O.S.B.Cas., Angelo Maria (1680-1755)". The Cardinals of the Holy Roman Church. Florida International University. OCLC 53276621. Archived from the original on 3 March 2016.
- Biblioteca Querinina, in Italian.
- Sambuca, Antonio (1757), Lettere intorno alla morte del cardinale Angelo Maria Querini vescovo di Brescia De Herculaneo Epistola (Engraved title vignette includes medallion portrait of Quirini; front. engraved by Francesco Zucchi ed.), Brescia: Jacopo Turlino

== See also ==
- Pope Benedict XIII
- Pope Clement XII
- Pompeo Batoni
- Jacopo Zoboli
