= Joseph von Petrasch =

German philologist

Joseph Leopold Freiherr von Petrasch
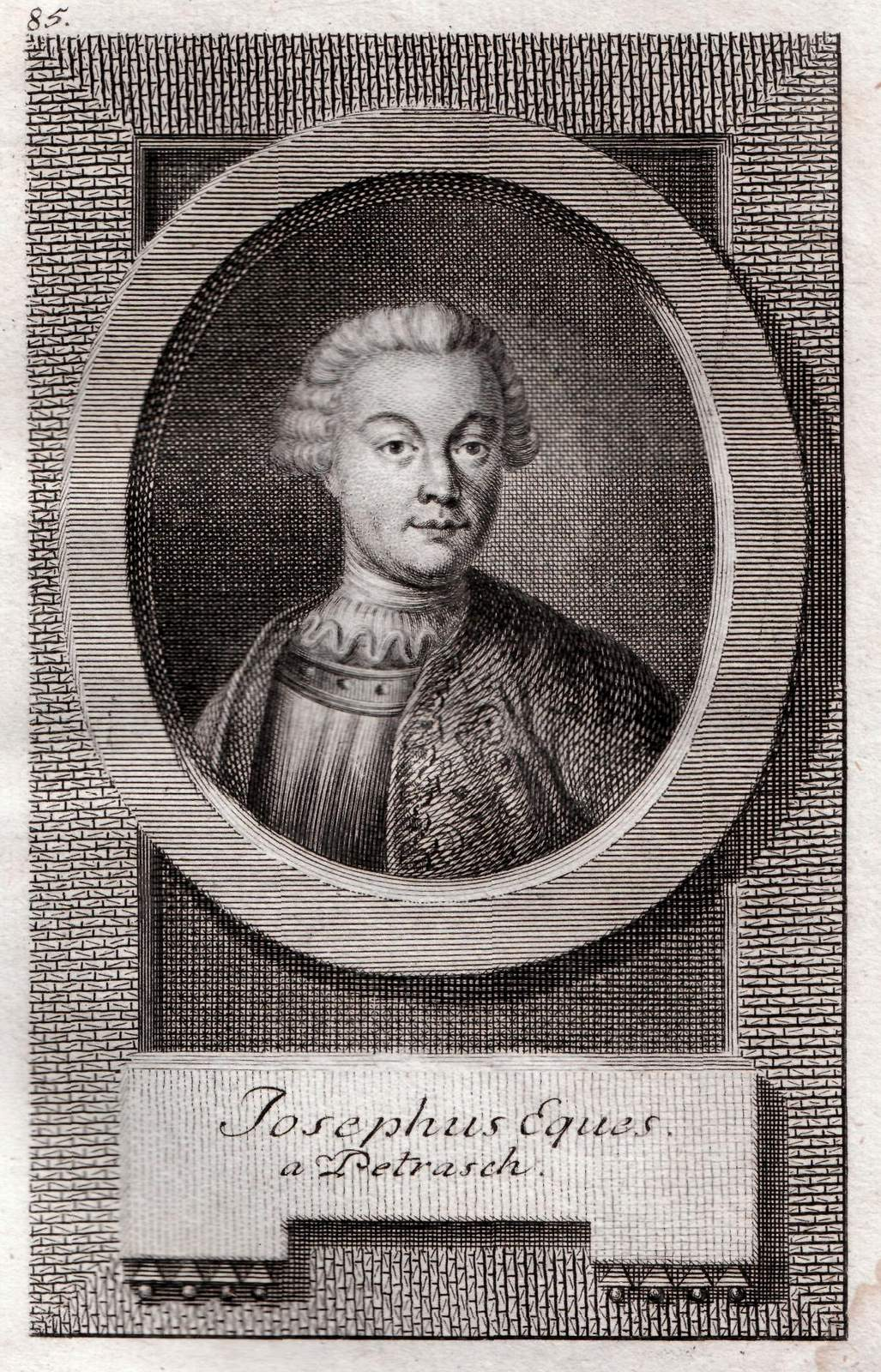
- Born: 19 October 1714; Slavonski Brod, Slavonia (now in Croatia)
- Died: 15 May 1772 (aged 57); Nesovice, Moravia

Joseph Leopold Freiherr von Petrasch (19 October 1714 in Slavonski Brod, Slavonia – 15 May 1772 in Nesovice, Moravia) was a soldier, writer and philologist. In 1746 he founded the Olomouc-based Societas incognitorum, the first Enlightenment-inspired learned society in the Habsburg territories.

As a young man he pursued a military career as adjutant to Prince Eugene of Savoy, accumulating substantial wealth. On 27 March 1750 Petrasch was able to buy the lordship of Nové Zámky Castle in today's Nesovice for 85,600 florins. He relocated here from Olomouc in 1758, which triggered a cultural awakening locally, Petrasch himself taking on a succession of theatrical productions. He also established a rich library which included valuable first editions and foreign publications.

When he died, his wife inherited a half of a farm in the village of Dublitz, and one of his daughters inherited He left four daughters, the eldest of whom, Antonia, when she died in 1781, had become the Countess (Gräfin) von Pütring. Her three younger sisters, Karolina of Lipowsky, Maria Anna von Petrasch and Josepha von Hochberg sold Nové Zámky in 1789 for 100,000 florins to Johann Nepomuk Wengerský von Ungarschitz.
