= Daniel J. Fairbanks =

American biologist

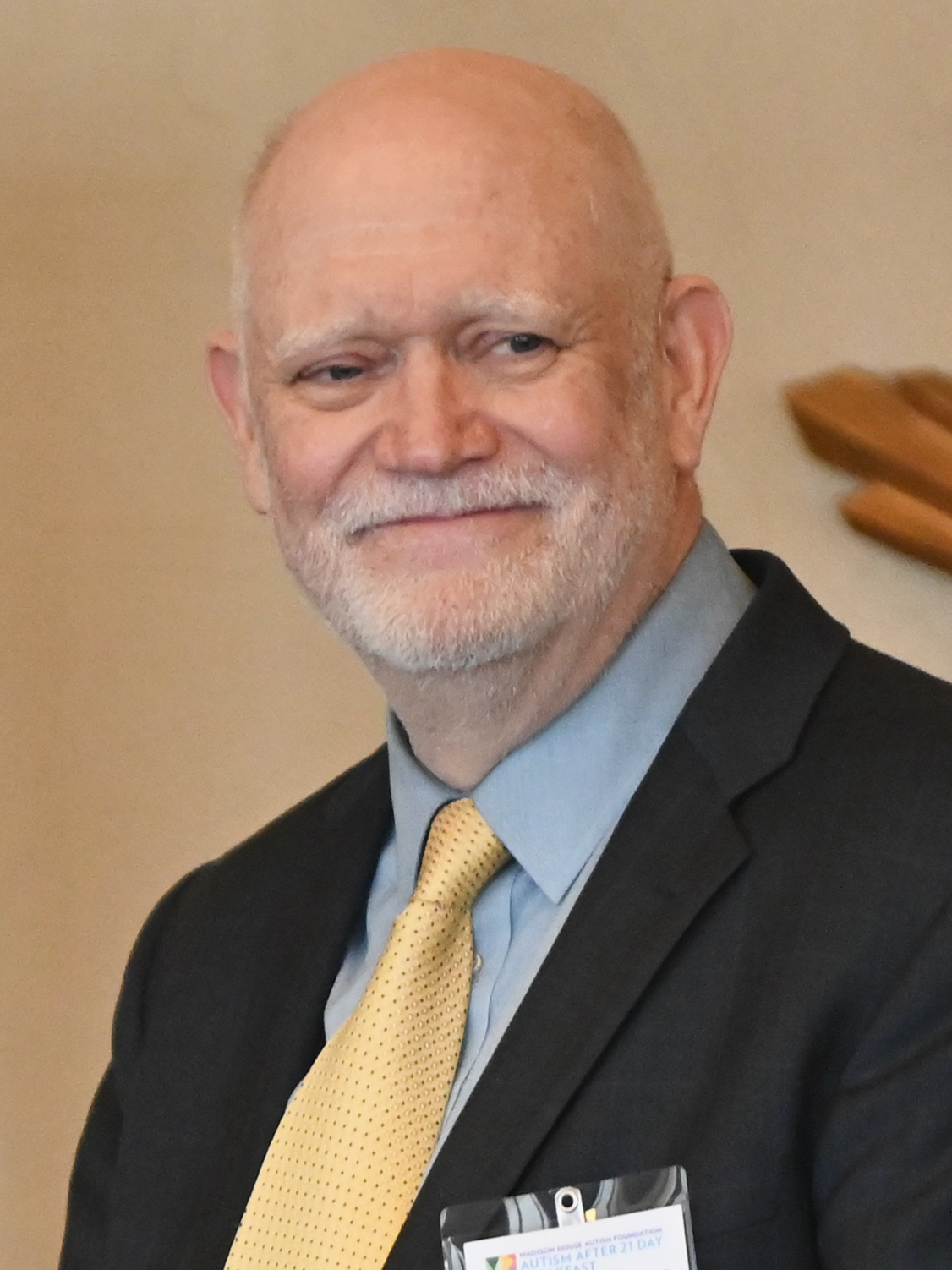
- Fairbanks in 2023
- Born: 1956 (age 69–70)
- Occupations: Biologist, professor

Daniel Justin Fairbanks (born 1956) is an American biologist who was formerly a dean of Undergraduate Education at Brigham Young University (BYU). He is a specialist in biology who has written books on the subject.

== Early life and education ==
Fairbanks is a great-grandson of John B. Fairbanks, an artist from Utah. Fairbanks received his undergraduate education at BYU. As a young man he served as a missionary for the Church of Jesus Christ of Latter-day Saints (LDS Church).

== Career ==
Fairbanks has been on the faculty of BYU since 1988. Besides being a biology professor he has served as head of the University Honors Program and associate dean of General Education and Honors.

Fairbanks has also served as a visiting professor at Universidade Estadual de Londrina and Southern Virginia University.

Fairbanks is also a sculptor who has works in some museum collections.

Fairbanks is currently Dean of the College of Health and Science at Utah Valley University in Orem, Utah.

Fairbanks is also an author. Some of his works include Genetics: The Continuity of Life, Relics of Eden: The Powerful Evidence of Evolution in Human DNA, an accessible book for non-specialist in genetics readers, Ending the Mendel-Fisher Controversy, and Shrubland Ecosystem Genetics and Biodiversity: Proceedings of a Conference.

== Bibliography ==
- Fairbanks, Daniel J. (2009). Relics of Eden: The Powerful Evidence of Evolution in Human DNA. Prometheus Books.
- Fairbanks, Daniel J. (2012). Evolving: The Human Effect and Why It Matters. Prometheus Books.
- Fairbanks, Daniel J. (2015). Everyone is African: How Science Explodes the Myth of Race. ISBN 978-1633880184.
