= Societas eruditorum incognitorum in terris Austriacis =

Learned society in Olomouc, Bohemia (1746–1751)

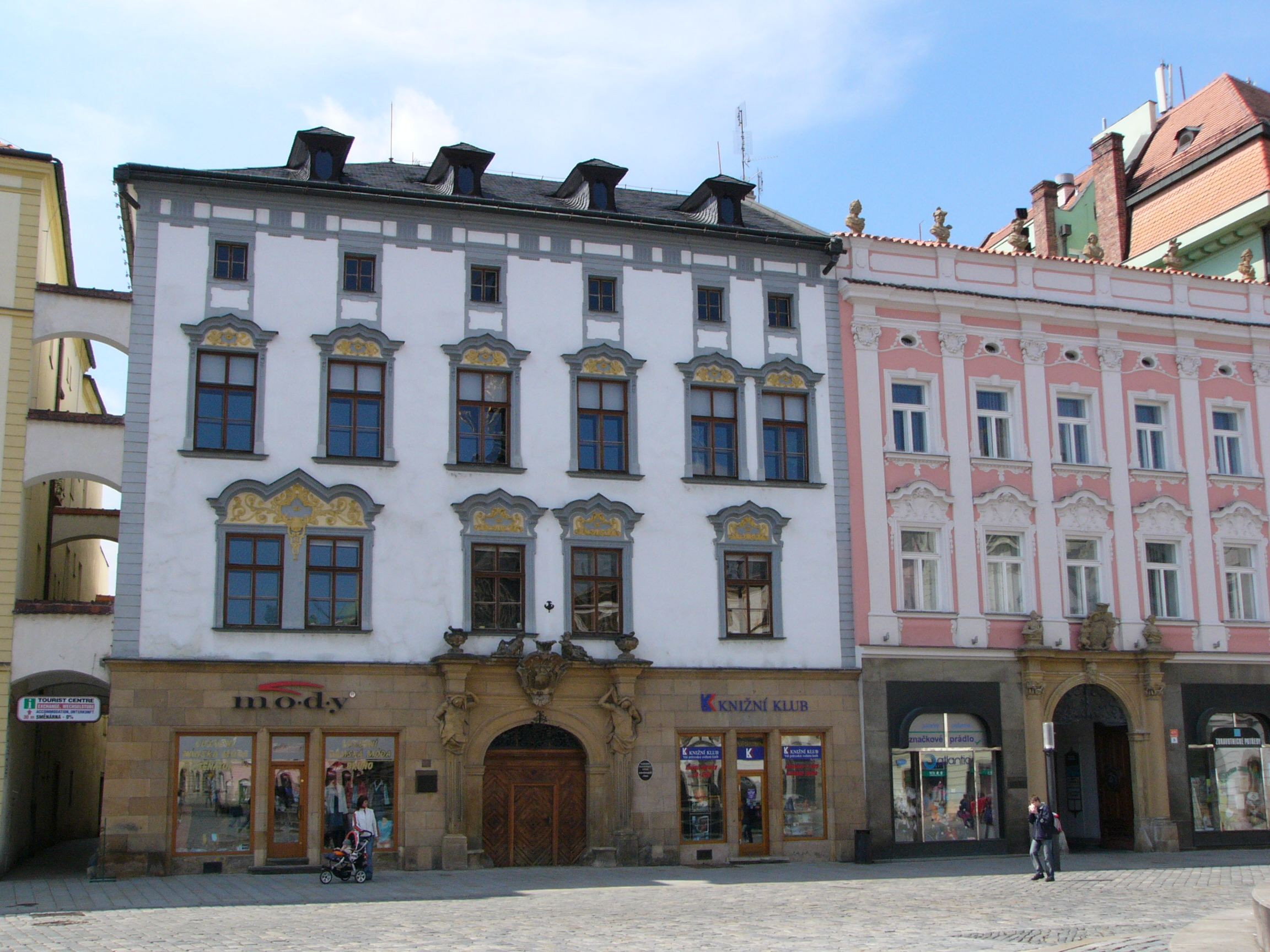
- Olomouc palace of Joseph von Petrasch
- Founded: 1746
- Founder: Joseph von Petrasch; Franz G. Giannini
- Dissolved: 1751
- Type: Learned society
- Location: Olomouc, Moravia, Kingdom of Bohemia
- Coordinates: 49.58999°N 17.26190°E
- Product: Monatliche Auszüge
- Key people: Johann Christoph Gottsched; Matthias Bel; Ludovico Antonio Muratori; Angelo Maria Quirini; Theodor Anton Taulow von Rosenthal; Johann Chr. von Jordan; Oliver Legipont; Magnoald Ziegelbauer; Hieronymus Pez

Location of Olomouc in The Czech Republic
- Location within Czech Republic
- Coordinates: 49°35′42″N 17°15′32″E

Societas eruditorum incognitorum in terris Austriacis (from Latin: "The Society of Anonymous Scholars in the Austrian Lands") was the first learned society in the lands under control of Austrian Habsburgs. It was established, formally, in 1746 at the university and episcopal town of Olomouc in order to spread Enlightenment ideas. Its monthly journal Monatliche Auszüge was the first scientific journal in the Habsburg Monarchy.

== Background ==
When the Habsburgs took over the Czech throne in 1526, as many as nine out of ten inhabitants of the crown lands were Protestants. Olomouc, as the episcopal seat became a centre for the counter-reformation, with the Jesuits taking over the local college in 1566. In 1573 the college was promoted to University status, and the special papal seminary, the Collegium Nordicum was established in 1578. Initially competing with the schools run by the Hussite "Bohemian Brethren", the Jesuits obtained an effective monopoly after the Thirty Years' War: this brought savage re-Catholicization and Germanization to the Czech population. The Jesuit monopoly was however challenged because the Moravian nobility wanted to expand the range of areas taught beyond just theology and philosophy. In 1679 secular legal studies were introduced at the University, and in 1725 the Academy of Nobility was established in Olomouc. Both these developments met with fierce opposition from the Jesuits.

It was the strong Jesuit reaction which led an alumnus of Faculty of Philosophy of Olomouc University, Joseph von Petrasch, to join with another locally based aristocrat, Francesco G. Giannini in obtaining the consent of empress Maria Theresa for the establishment of a learned society in 1746. Von Petrasch was a noble of Slavonian origin who at one stage had studied law at Leiden and who had also pursued a career as an adjutant to Prince Eugene of Savoy, which had left him with the financial means to support the Societas eruditorum from his private wealth.

== Objectives ==
The society set itself the goals of advancing the sciences, in particular the natural sciences, mathematics, numismatics, and the history of scientific research, along with philology and literature. In the religious conflicts of the time between Protestants and Catholics, the Societas eruditorum took an objective and pragmatic approach, and it had members in both camps.

== Members ==
Petrasch was able to recruit many members from across Central Europe, eager to spread Enlightenment ideas with a journal of their own. The members included local members of the nobility, state officials (such as Theodor Anton Taulow von Rosenthal and Johann Chr. von Jordan), and Benedictine ecclesiastical historians (Benedictines such as Oliver Legipont, Magnoald Ziegelbauer and Hieronymus Pez). Its so-called "corresponding members" included the north German dramatist, critic, and German language reformer Johann Christoph Gottsched, the Slovak founder of Hungarian history-writing Matthias Bel, leading Italian scholars Ludovico Antonio Muratori and Angelo Maria Quirini and the Czech Bonaventura Piter as well as the Archbishop of Kraków Andrzej Stanisław Załuski and the Cardinal Domenico Silvio Passionei.

The members were designated as "anonymous" in order to avoid repressions from the state censors.

== Journal ==
The society published the first scientific journal in the Habsburg monarchy, the Olmützer Monathlichen Auszüge Alt- und neuer Gelehrter Sachen (Olomouc's Monthly Excerpts from Old and New Erudition), with each issue having some 80 pages. The journal was on sale in Olomouc, Brno, Prague, Vienna, as well as by book sellers in Nuremberg, Wrocław, Leipzig or Bautzen.

== Focus ==
It was especially concerned with the reform and promotion of the German language as well as with spreading the Enlightenment ideas. The society was propagating various streams of contemporary thought. Two of them were of particular importance: the philosophical rationalism of Christian Wolff, a practical approach to philosophy which in Moravia was combined with the Catholic reformism of Ludovico Antonio Muratori; and the school of critical historiography stemming from Jean Mabillon.

The German focus of the Society was not so much aimed against Czech language, rather against the prevailing use of Latin as lingua franca as well as against the gallomania of the high German society.

The Society received state protection, but opposition from within the Jesuit-dominated town, ongoing problems with Vienna-based censors, as well as disagreements from within the Society itself, led to its premature demise. Nevertheless, its periodical represented a landmark: the first attempt within the Habsburg monarchy to unite the learned, the dilettanti and the curieux and to bring them into contact with the pan-European Respublica literaria.

== See also ==
- Josef Vratislav Monse
