= Magnoald Ziegelbauer =

German church historian

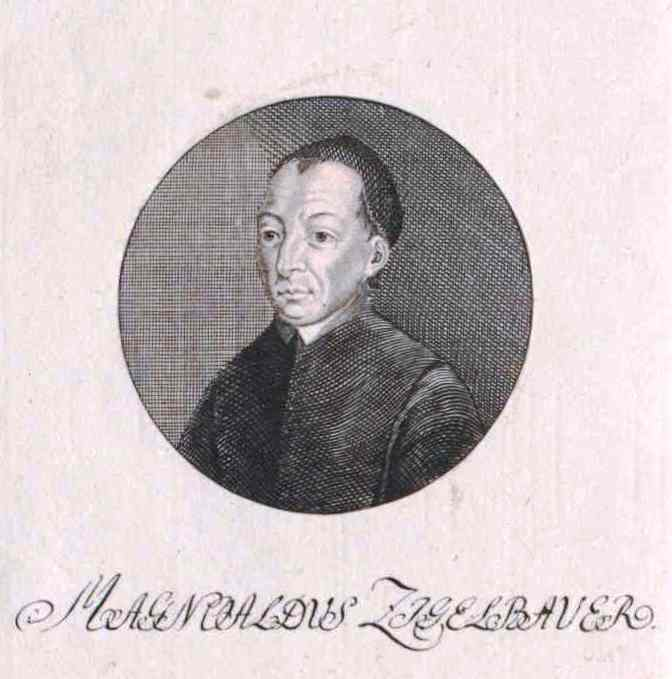
Magnoald Ziegelbauer

Magnoald Ziegelbauer (1689 – 14 January 1750) was a Benedictine monk and ecclesiastical historian.

== Life ==
Ziegelbauer was born in 1689 in Ellwangen, Swabia. He took vows at the Benedictine monastery of Zwiefalten on 21 November 1707, where he was ordained priest on 21 March 1713 and where he became professor of theology. Soon however some of the illiterate monks of Zwiefalten made plain their dislike of the learned and studious Ziegelbauer, who therefore obtained his abbot's permission to live at another monastery of the order.

At first he went to Reichenau Abbey, where he taught theology. About 1730 the prior of this imperial monastery sent him to the court of Vienna on business relating to the monastery, after the successful accomplishment of which he taught moral theology at Göttweig Abbey from 1732 to 1733, then returned to Vienna to devote himself to literary activity.

In 1734, he became tutor of the young Barons von Latermann. From 1747 until his death he resided at Olomouc as secretary of the first learned society in the Habsburg Monarchy, the Societas eruditorum incognitorum in terris Austriacis. He died in Olomouc on 14 January 1750.

== Works ==
- His chief literary work is Historia rei literariae ordinis S. Benedicti, which was published posthumously by his friend and collaborator Oliverius Legipontius (4 volumes, Augsburg 1754) and still remains a standard literary history of the Benedictine Order.

His other 19 printed works include:

- Mancipatus illibatae virginis deciparae (Constance, 1726).
- Lebengeschichte des ertz-martyrers Stephani (Vienna, 1736).
- Epitome historica regii, liberii et exempti in regno Bohemiae antiquissimi monasterii Brevnoviensis (Cologne, 1740).
- other historical and theological treatises of minor importance.

Works unprinted (as of 1908) are:

- Olomucium sacrum, an ecclesiastical history of Moravia and its bishops.
- Bibliotheca Bohemica, a collection of writers on Bohemia.
