= Antonín Strnad =

Czech astronomer and meteorologist

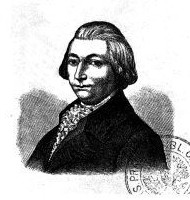
- Born: 10 August 1746; Náchod, Bohemia
- Died: 23 September 1799 (aged 53); Sazená, Bohemia
- Resting place: cemetery of the Church of St. Clement in Chržín; 50.296331°N 14.271235°E
- Education: Charles University
- Known for: founder of Czech scientific meteorology, agrometeorology and phenology starting the longest continuous series of meteorological observations in the world.
- Spouse: Kateřina Marsanová
- Children: 4
- Scientific career
- Fields: mathematics, astronomy, education, writing, astrology, meteorology
- Workplaces: Faculty of Arts, Charles University in Prague

Antonín Strnad (10 August 1746 – 23 September 1799) was a Czech meteorologist, geographer and mathematician. He was a professor and rector of the Charles-Ferdinand University in Prague and director of the observatory in Clementinum. He is considered the founder of Czech scientific meteorology, agrometeorology and phenology, and also one of the founders of the Czech National Revival. He began recording his meteorological observations in Clementinum and in 1775 he began the longest continuous series of observations in the world.

== Life ==
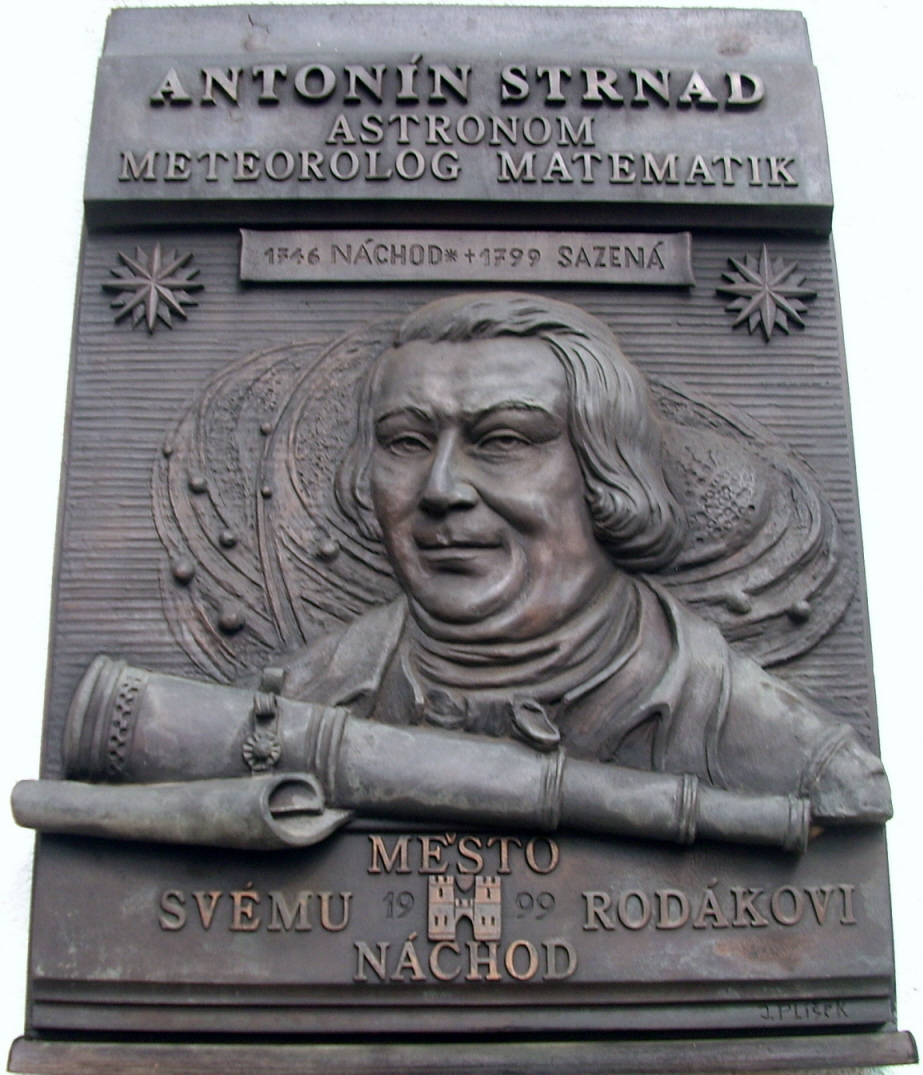
Commemorative plaque of two hundredth anniversary of Antonín Strnad death, in Náchod, Czech Republic

Strnad was born on 10 August 1746 in Náchod, Bohemia. He studied at the grammar school in Hradec Králové. In 1763 he entered the Jesuit Order; however, he was not ordained and after the dissolution of the Order in 1773 he moved to the Charles-Ferdinand University, where he studied mathematics, physics and astronomy. He was a pupil of Joseph Stepling, the founder of the observatory at Clementinum, where he was adjunct professor from 1774, and also took care of the Mathematical museum. After Stepling's death, he joined the department in 1778 as an adjunct professor of mathematical and physical geography. He was appointed director of the observatory in 1781, dean of the faculty of philosophy in 1792, and served as rector of the university for a year from 1795. In 1784 he married Kateřina Marsanová, with whom he later had four children. During his lifetime he corresponded, for example, with the director of the observatory in Berlin, Johann III Bernoulli, the publisher of the Berlin astronomical calendar, Johann Elert Bode, the director of the observatory in Vienna, M. Hell, the director of the observatory in Gotha, Fr. X. von Zach.

In the 1880s, Strnad also contributed to the rescue of the Prague astronomical clock, which had been in critical condition since 1735 and the Prague magistrate intended to put it away. Strnad, however, understood its historical value and therefore sought its repair. After a long effort, he managed to convince the magistrate Fischer and then the entire magistrate, who released the amount of money needed for the reconstruction. Under Strnad's expert supervision, the repair was carried out for 793 gold coins between 1787 and 1791 by the clockmaker Simon Landsperger. As the magistrate realised the great service Strnad had done for the city, he was admitted together with his sons to the association of Prague burgesses and was exempted from all fees.

== Astronomical and meteorological measurements ==
By observing the height of the Sun as it passed through the meridian using a quadrant of 3.5 feet radius, which he made in 1776, he calculated the latitude of the Clementine Observatory. With the result φ = 50° 4′ 32″ he supplemented Stepling's longitude of 32° 11′ 15″ east of El Hierro, and thus the exact position of the observatory was determined. He based his calculations on 42 measurements.

Already as a member of the Jesuit order, Strnad made measurements of meteorological data. From J. Stepling he gained further experience with regular meteorological observations. His diaries from the beginning of 1775 have been preserved; regular measurements (pressure, temperature, precipitation, wind speed and direction) have been made in Clementinum ever since. Strnad also initiated the establishment of other meteorological stations in Bohemia (e.g. in Choceň, Telč, Žatec, Planá, Žitenice, etc.). He dealt with meteor observations and measurements of the Earth's magnetic field.

== Regia Societas Scientiarum Bohemica ==
Strnad was a member of the Regia Societas Scientiarum Bohemica (or Royal Bohemian Society of Sciences), which supported the establishment of an international network of meteorological stations in the Northern Hemisphere, and between 1781 and 1792 he participated in the activities of the society. In order to compare measurements with each other, he initiated regular measurements at 7 am, 2 pm and 9 pm - times that are still in use today. Strnad's high-quality materials, which he produced for the company, earned him three public commendations. In the Mannheim Yearbook he wrote: "However, our observatory is situated on a very low site and surrounded by houses, mainly Jewish, on the north and east sides. Although they are all lower there, it is still certain that the smoke reciprocally, though more rarely, from so many hundreds of neighbouring chimneys causes a change in the temperature..." With this contribution he anticipated by half a century Luke Howard's observation of 1833 that the climate of the city is greatly affected by the heat caused, amongst others, by the burning of large quantities of fuel.

Strnad, as a Czech scientist and author, was one of the figures of the nascent Czech National Revival and ranks with names such as Josef Dobrovský, Karel Rafael Ungar, or Jan Bohumír Dlabač. He also tried to bring science to a wider audience. Most of Strnad's writings are written in German, some in Latin and only a minimum in Czech but this did not contradict the fact that he was a Czech scientist. At the time of the birth of the Czech National Revival, Josef Dobrovský, its leading figure, also wrote in German about Czech, just as the Societas scientiarum Bohemica published its works (Abhandlungen der bohmischen Gesellschaft der Wissenschaften) in this language. Strnad's scientific activity is inextricably linked to this private Scholarly Society, in whose Abhandlungen of 1775 he published his first article on meteorology - on weather observations in 1774.

He was chairman of the Royal Bohemian Society of Sciences from 1787 to 1788. He became the curator of the society's collections and in 1791 he lectured on solar eclipses at its ceremonial meeting in the presence of Emperor Leopold II. Three years later, he was removed by its management from the administration of the network of meteorological observations which the society intended to organize. The cause seems to have been the fear of its conservative members of the strict ban on secret societies issued by the Viennese government in fear of the Enlightenment, the originators of the French Revolution of 1789. Even Strnad's forced written declaration that he was not a member of a secret society or association did not satisfy suspicions. More recent documents confirm that he was a Freemason (until 1848, Masonic lodges were public). This revocation probably led to Strnad becoming involved shortly thereafter in the organization of meteorological volunteer stations within the Patriotic Economic Society.

As the former secretary of the Royal Bohemian Society of Sciences, Josef Dobrovský, had been seriously ill for a long time, ten members met in Strnad's apartment in December 1795 and elected him as the former assistant secretary to this honorary office in place of Dobrovský, without asking the later leader of the Czech national revival for his consent. J. Dobrovský was deeply affected by this indiscretion, because he considered it a suspension and the result was the end of his friendship with Antonín Strnad. In a letter to Ferenc Széchényi from Prague on 24 November 1795, Strnad wrote that Josef Dobrovský was behaving foolishly and that his actions were compromising the Royal Bohemian Society of Sciences, of which he was secretary. He claims theologically unsustainable things and demands the restoration of the Jesuit Order, etc. Dobrovský's strange behaviour is explained by the fact that in June 1795 he suffered a serious mental illness, which lasted for two months, and after a short stay in an insane asylum it returned to Dobrovský later.

Strnad tried to transform the private learned society into a public Royal Bohemian Society, thanks to which he was also in the delegation that submitted a petition for the establishment of a public learned society to Emperor Joseph II in September 1784. In 1793 he delivered his lecture On the Type of Solar Eclipses before Emperor Leopold II. In 1799 Strnad fell ill with tuberculosis. After his health deteriorated, Fürst Ferdinand Kinský invited him to his castle in Sazená to recover. However, Antonín Strnad died there on 23 September 1799. He is buried in the cemetery of the Church of St. Clement in Chržín near Velvary.

In his honour, a street in the Prague district Malešice was named Strnadova Street in 1931.

== Works ==
- Chronologisches Verzeichnis etc. (1790) (Chronological index etc.) In the book he also presented phenological observations of the weather.
- Stoletý kalendář na způsob Kryštofa z Helwiku (1793) (Centennial calendar in the manner of Christopher of Helwig)
- Verzeichnis der Naturbegebenheiten in Böhmen vom Jahre 633-1700 (1790) (List of natural phenomena in Bohemia from the year 633–1700)
- Beobachtungen über einige meteorologische Gegenstände besonders über die Ebbe und Fluth in der Luft etc. (1785) (Observations on some meteorological objects especially on the ebb and flow in the air etc.)
- a series of articles popularising meteorology and addressed to farmers, winegrowers, foresters, fruit growers
