= Vratislava of Hrabišic =

Czech nobleman

Vratislava
- Born: 12th century
- Died: After 1230
- Spouse: Kojata IV Hrabišic

Vratislava (died after 1230) was a Czech noblewoman.

Her origin is unknown. She married Kojata IV Hrabišic, to whom she did not bear any children. In his will from 1227, Kojata bequeathed to her the villages of Budíkovice, Kojetice, Jiřinovice, Tlustovousy, Limuzy, Šestajovice and Ostřešany, which after her death were to belong to the Zderaz Monastery. The following year, Kojata died. Between 1227 and 1230, Vratislava participated in the founding of a branch of the Zderaz Monastery in Světec.

== Literature ==
- Velímský, Tomáš. Hrabišici Všebor a Kojata a počátku vrcholně středověkého Mostu (in Czech). Český časopis historický. p. 324.
- Žemlička, Josef (2002). Počátky Čech královských 1198–1253 (in Czech). Prague: Lidové noviny. p. 964. ISBN 80-7106-140-9.
