= Stanislav Vydra =

Stanislav Vydra (13 November 1741 – 2 December 1804) was a Czech Jesuit priest, writer, and mathematician.

== Life ==
Vydra was born in Hradec Králové on 13 November 1741. He entered the Jesuit novitiate of Hradec Králové in 1757. After two years in Brno, he studied philosophy and mathematics from 1762 to 1764 at Charles University. His teachers included Joseph Stepling and Jan Tesánek.

In 1765, he went as a teacher to Jičín and became Stepling's assistant a year later. He ministered as parish priest in Vilémov from 1771 to 1772. In 1772, Vydra was appointed professor of mathematics in Charles University in Prague. Here he taught until 1773. From 1789 to 1799, he was appointed to the mathematics faculty and served as dean of the Faculty of Arts. He became the rector of the university in 1800. He went blind in 1803 and died in Prague on 2 December 1804. He is buried in Prague at the Olšany Cemetery in Prague.

== Teachings ==
Stanislav Vydra taught elementary mathematics, a compulsory subject for the students at the philosophical faculty since 1752. He published “Elementa calcvli differentialis et integralis” in 1783, which became a well-known calculus textbook in Prague. After his death, his pupil and successor Josef Ladislav Jandera published his book Pocátkowé Arytmetyky, which was the first text book of elementary mathematics in Bohemia.

== Selected works ==
- Historia Matheseos in Bohemia et Moravia cultae, 1778
- Elementa Calcvli Differentialis, et Integralis, 1783
- Počátkowé Arytmetyky, 1806
