= Oto Biederman =

Czech serial killer

- Born: 5 August 1973 (age 53); Brandýs nad Labem-Stará Boleslav, Czechoslovakia
- Conviction: Murder
- Penalty: Life imprisonment

Details
- Victims: 5
- Span of crimes: 1993–1995
- Country: Czech Republic

Oto Biederman (born 5 August 1973) is a Czech serial killer and member of the "Kolínský Gang", sentenced to life imprisonment for murdering 5 people.

== Youth ==
Biederman was born in Brandýs nad Labem in 1973, but his family soon moved to Tlustovousy (now part of Tuklaty). In his early life, he didn't differ much from his peers, as he came from a loving family, was an average student and did not cause trouble at school. After primary school, he began his studies in the field of biochemistry with a focus on distillery and viticulture at the Kojetín secondary vocational school. In the second year, he was forced to interrupt school due to disciplinary problems and went to work in the Kolín distillery. After a year, he returned to learning and graduated with honours. Biederman worked in the distillery until 1993, and since he began to develop an intensive interest in weapons and martial arts, he found a job as a security guard. He went through several security agencies before he stopped working completely in 1994.

== Murders ==
=== Josef Dovhanič (36) ===
In the spring of 1993, SAFE-GUARD's operational director Ivan Vrábel was scheduled to work with two other employees, Roman Procházka and Jiří Šťastný, who planned to rob a Krone department store in Prague. The guarding of the facility was provided by their agency, so they had a good overview of the building's security. Procházka and Šťastný had to get in service uniforms to the back door, eliminate the guard and rob the safe. None of them, however, was willing to kill the guard, and so, they convinced Oto Biederman after two previous unsuccessful attempts. On the night of 6–7 July, Šťastný, Procházka and Biederman went to the Krone department store dressed in the uniforms, which was located on the corner of Jindřišská Street and Wenceslas Square. As Procházka guarded the building's front, Biederman attacked the guard Josef Dovhanič with a tonfa. When he fell to the ground, the two criminals cut him with a wire before finally stabbing the victim with a knife and a needle. The trio took away more than 3,000,000 CZK from the store, from which Biederman only received 200,000.

=== Martin Srb (28) ===
In the spring of 1995, Martin Srb, owner of a small gloves factory, mentioned his planned trip to the United States, for which a large amount of money had to be prepared at his vault at home. The gang, who knew Srb, chose to lure him to a lonely place, kill him there, and rob the keys from the safe that he was supposed to carry around. On the evening of 1 June, Biederman and Jaroslav Pavlíček met Srb in the village of Škvorec, inviting him to a billiard club in Prague 21. They strolled towards a deserted parking lot, where someone was supposed to join them. As soon as Srb stepped out of his car, Biederman approached him and shot him twice in the heart and head. The body was then taken to the house of another accomplice, Milan Chládek, but only found 7,000 CZK and a few details when they searched the corpse. The criminals then buried the body, and Srb's vault had to be seized without the keys. His house was kept for days, and only after the deceased's wife and children left, the gang members got inside and stole the safe. They cut it in Biederman's house, but did not find any money. This was due to the fact that after her husband's disappearance, Srb's wife had taken all the money from the house. She also told the authorities that she had seen Biederman and Pavlíček on the day of the murder, but there was no conclusive proof to the allegations.

=== Zdeněk Langer (43) ===
On 7 June 1995, Biederman and Chládek decided to rob a gas station, choosing the 'MOTA Pump' in Prague 9. While Chládek was watching the car, Biederman asked 43-year-old Zdenêk Langer for a pack of cigarettes. As they went in, he aimed at his head with a revolver and instructed to take out the money. Langer handed over a wallet with 30,000 CZK to Biederman. At that moment, Chládek opened the door to check the situation, causing Langer to move and Biederman to subsequently shoot him in the head. When the latter was leaving, he shot again. Together with Chládek, all the stolen money was spent that same night at a nightclub.

=== Jaroslav Pavlíček (27) ===
Another one of Biederman's victims became the former accomplice Pavlíček. He had inherited land in Prague, which Ivan Vrábel wanted to take possession of and use it for business. Vrábel told Pavlíček his intention to buy the land at a fair price, scheduling a meeting on September 28 together with Biederman, who would pick him up at his parents' house. The former invited the latter to his room and settled Pavlíček on the couch, before opening a wardrobe, taking out a submachine gun and shooting Pavlíček six times. Because it seemed that he was still moving, Biederman stabbed him in the heart with a dagger. He then put the body in the wardrobe and buried the body at night near the house. His family was present at home during the murder, but they weren't surprised by the gunshots, as Biederman reportedly often shot in his room. However, the gang did not gain any land, because it was not fully transferred to Pavlíček at the time of his death.

=== Tomáš Bleier (45) ===
At the end of 1995, Vrábel was approached by a group of entrepreneurs in Litvínov. A pair of men from the Vsetín District owed 2,000,000 CZK for the taken goods, and so the entrepreneurs had therefore chosen for one of them to be murdered. The victim chosen was Tomáš Bleier. The gang members to undertake the job were Chládek, Biederman and a new member – Miroslav Karnoš. They would lure him with a profitable deal, and at their first meeting in Valašské Meziříčí, Bleier told them he was only interested in the trade of non-ferrous metal. Under this pretext, the group invited him to the Apollo Hotel on 17 January 1996. Biederman secured a hotel room using a stolen ID card, in which he, Karnoš and Bleier would meet, with Chládek waiting prepared in the car. They began discussing the sale of copper. Bleier, however, settled in a chair, making it impossible for a planned attack. It was only when he was asked about the size of the promised copper that Karnoš had prompted him to the window to show a warehouse near the hotel. As Bleier stood up and walked to the window, Biederman put his hand over his mouth and stabbed him in the stomach with a dagger. When Bleier slumped down, both men punched him several times in the throat and chest. They robbed the body, put it in bed, locked the room and broke the key and lock.

== Capture and sentence ==
The search for Bleier's killers involved police units in several counties, as it was necessary to map his extensive business activities. An important testimony was given by some random passers-by, who spotted a red Renault 25 with noticeably muddy license plates on the day of the murder. Bleier's family managed to decode his electronic diary, in which there was information about the red Renault, which was owned by Miroslav Karnoš, whom he had met briefly before the murder. Karnoš, after his detention, refused to confess to the murder. In order to secure his alibi, however, he introduced the names of Biederman and Chládek, who had moved to the North Moravian Region that day. Both were soon detained, and the men accused Karnoš of the crime. He, after getting acquainted with their testimonies, decided to reveal the truth not only about Bleier's killing but also about all previous murders. In 1998 and 1999, everybody from the "Kolínský Gang" was sentenced for their share in the crimes: Jiří Šťastný – 12.5 years, Roman Procházka – 13 years, Miroslav Karnoš – 13.5 years, Milan Chládek – 18 years (after the appeal, originally 25 years), Ivan Vrábel – 24.5 years and Oto Biederman – life.

== See also ==
- List of serial killers by country
