= Jan Tesánek =

- Born: 9 December 1728; Brandýs nad Labem, Kingdom of Bohemia
- Died: 22 June 1788 (aged 59); Prague, Kingdom of Bohemia
- Education: Charles University
- Known for: Spreading knowledge of scientific findings throughout Europe
- Scientific career
- Fields: mathematics, physics, astronomy
- Workplaces: Charles University; University of Olomouc
- Doctoral advisor: Joseph Stepling

Jan Tesánek (Latin: Joannis Tessanek) (1728–1788) was a Bohemian scholar and author of scientific literature.

== Biography ==
Tesánek studied at a gymnasium (school) in Prague and later at Faculty of Philosophy of Charles University. In 1745, he became a Jesuit and studied mathematics, physics and astronomy under Joseph Stepling, a student of Ignatz Mühlwenzel. Stepling introduced Tesánek to the works of Isaac Newton. After finishing under the Faculty of Philosophy, Tesánek continued with study of theology. He was then ordained a priest and became professor of physics at Charles University. Later, he taught mathematics at the University of Olomouc. Two years later he returned to Prague to assume a professorship of high mathematics at the University. He remained at the University after the dissolution of the Jesuit order in 1773 and assumed the position of head of the Department of Mathematics and Physics in 1778. Tesánek is known for his many writings on the science of the day, helping to spread knowledge of scientific findings throughout Europe.

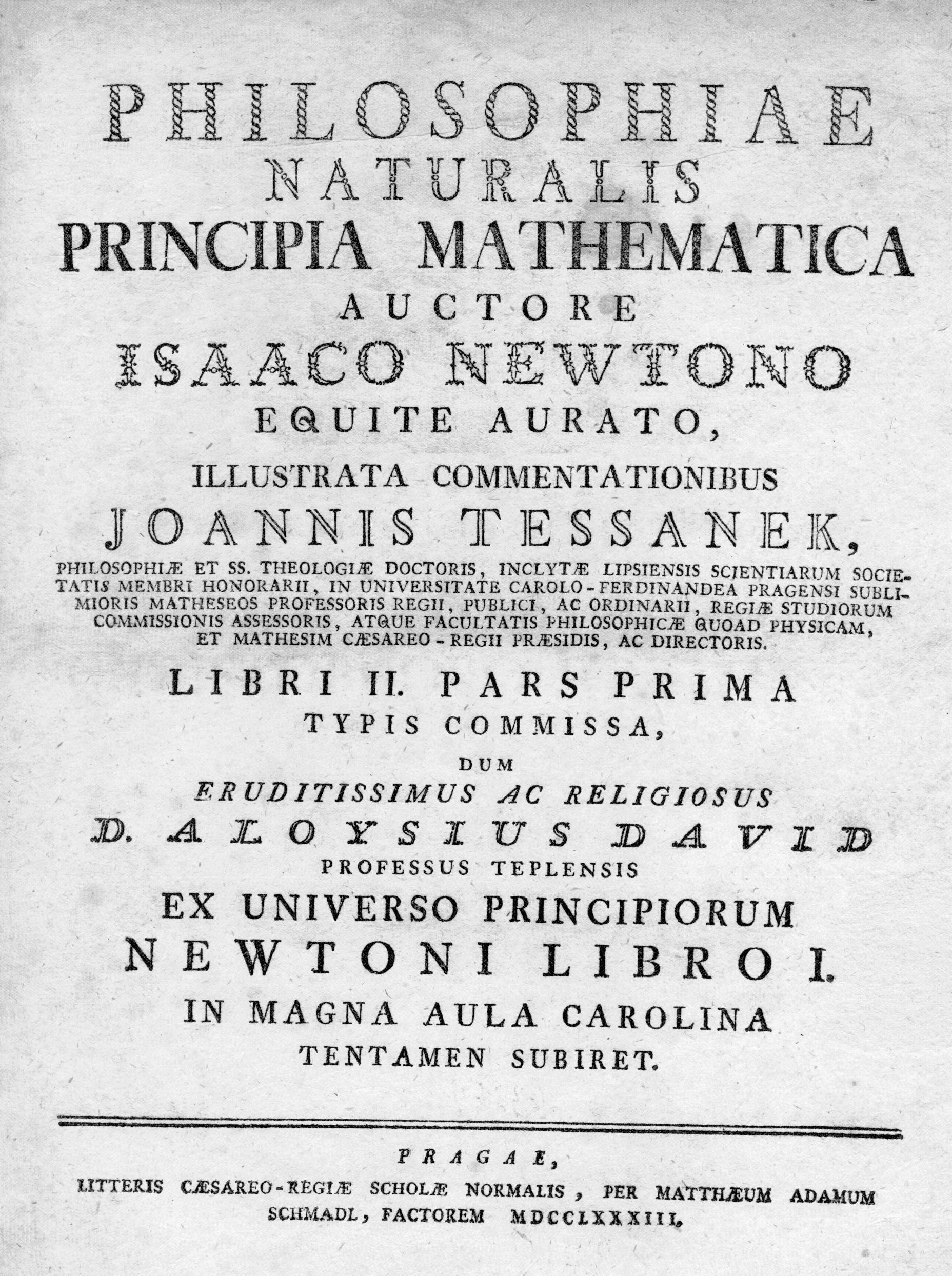
Tesánek's Principia Mathematica

== Major works ==
- Miscellanea mathematica (1764, 1769)
- Sectiones conoidum (1764)
- Pertractatio quorundam modorum quaestiones geometricas resolvendi (1770)
- Pertractatio elementorum calculi integralis (1771)
- Isaaci Newtoni Libri I. principiorum mathematicorum philosophiae naturalis Sect. I-V exposita (1769)
- Betrachtungen über eine Stelle der allgmeinen Arithmetik Isaac Newtons (1784)
- Versuch über einige Stellen in Newtons Principiis (1776)
- Algebraische Behandlung der XII Section des I. Buches des grossen Werkes Newtons (1777)
- Philosophiae naturalis principia mathematica, auctore Isaaco Newtono, illustrata commentationibus potissimum Is. Tesanek et quibusdam in locis commentation ibus veterioribus clarissimorum Thom. Le Sueur et Fried. Jacquier, ex Gallicana Minorum familia Matheseos Professorum aliter propositis (Tesánek's most important work, two books, 1780 a 1785).
