= Bunzlau =

The German name Bunzlau can refer to:

- Bolesławiec (Bunzlau) in Poland
- Mladá Boleslav (Jungbunzlau) in the Czech Republic
- The former city Stará Boleslav (Altbunzlau), now part of Brandýs nad Labem-Stará Boleslav (Brandeis-Altbunzlau) in the Czech Republic.
