= Rudolf Kirs =

Czech cellist

Rudolf Kirs

Rudolf Kirs (16 June 1915, Brandýs nad Labem – 8 July 1963 Prague) was a Czech cellist. He was the concert master of the Prague Radio Symphony Orchestra from 1953 to 1963.
