= Royal Bohemian Society of Sciences =

Scientific learned society in the Kingdom of Bohemia (1784–1952)

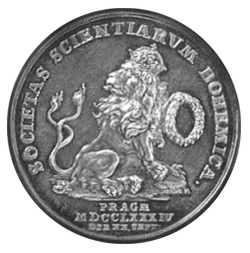
- Formation: 1784
- Dissolved: 1952
- Type: Learned society
- Headquarters: Prague, Kingdom of Bohemia, Habsburg Empire (now Czech Republic)
- Coordinates: 50.0860844°N 14.4232033°E
- Region served: Lands of the Bohemian Crown, later Czechoslovakia
- Official language: Latin, German, Czech

Royal Bohemian Society of Sciences (Latin: Regia Societas Scientiarum Bohemica; German: Königliche böhmische Gesellschaft der Wissenschaften; Czech: Královská česká společnost nauk) was established in 1784 – originally without the adjective "royal" – which was granted as late as in 1790 by King and Emperor Leopold II – to be the scientific center for Lands of the Bohemian Crown. It was succeeded by the Czechoslovak Academy of Sciences in 1952, and finally became what is known today as the Czech Academy of Sciences in 1992.

== History ==
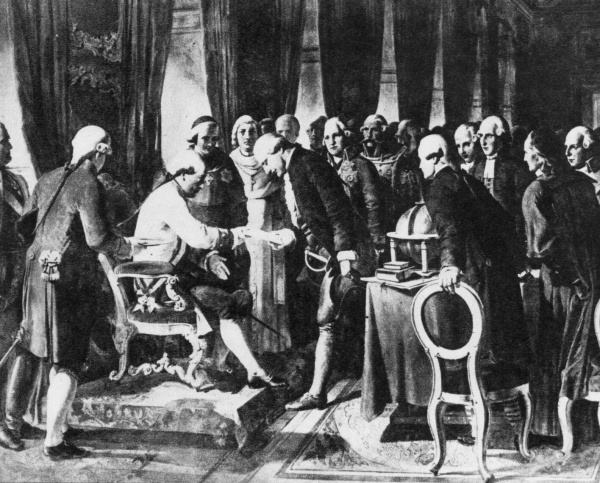
Festive audience of the Society members with the Emperor Leopold II, 1790

The Society was founded by philologist Josef Dobrovský, historian Gelasius Dobner and mathematician and the founder of Prague University Observatory, Joseph Stepling. Later it was headed by historian and politician František Palacký.

As early as 1861–1863 anatomist Jan Evangelista Purkyně proposed in his treatise Academia the establishment of an autonomous non-university scientific institution associating research institutes representing the main fields of the science of that time. This idea of an institution engaged in interdisciplinary research corresponds to the concept and structure of the present Academy of Sciences.

By the end of the 19th century, language-differentiated scientific institutions arose in this country: the Czech Academy of Sciences and the Arts (Czech: Česká akademie věd a umění, 1890–1952) and the Association for the Fostering of German Science, Arts and Literature in Bohemia (German: Gesellschaft zur Förderung deutscher Wissenschaft, Kunst und Literatur in Böhmen, 1891–1945). Czech Academy of Science and the Arts was founded owing to the significant financial support from Czech architect, entrepreneur and philanthropist Josef Hlávka, who became its first president. The aim of this institution was to promote the development of Czech science and literature and to support Czech arts. The most important work of this Academy was its publication activities. Scholarships and financial support were also provided and smaller research units arose upon its initiative as well.

After the foundation of the independent Czechoslovak Republic (1918) other scientific institutions were established, such as the Masaryk Academy of Labour (Masarykova akademie práce) and autonomous state institutes, such as the Slavonic, Oriental and Archaeological Institutes. International relationships of Czech research institutions grew with their affiliation to the International Union of Academies and the International Research Council.

After the totalitarian regime came to power in Czechoslovakia in 1948, all scientific, non-university institutions and learned societies were dissolved and instead the Czechoslovak Academy of Sciences was founded. In 1992 the Academy of Sciences of the Czech Republic was established by Act No. 283/1992.
