= Agrometeorology =

Study of weather

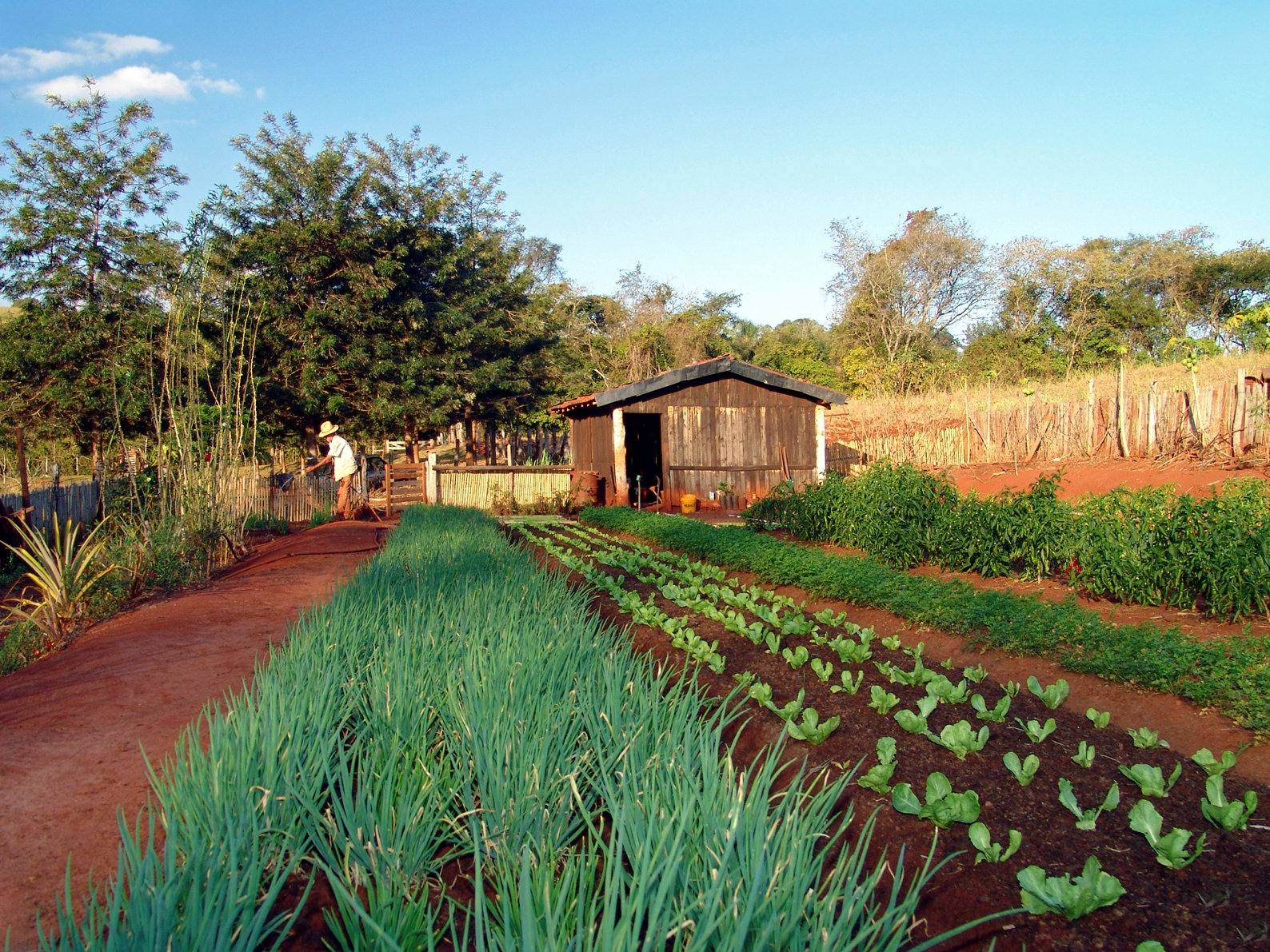
Horticulture is strongly influenced by climatic variations, however small.

Agrometeorology is the study of weather and use of weather and climate information to enhance or expand agricultural crops or to increase crop production. Agrometeorology mainly involves the interaction of meteorological and hydrological factors, on one hand and agriculture, which encompasses horticulture, animal husbandry, and forestry.

== Description ==
It is an interdisciplinary, holistic science forming a bridge between physical and biological sciences and beyond. It deals with a complex system involving soil, plant, atmosphere, agricultural management options, and others, which are interacting dynamically on various spatial and temporal scales. Specifically, the fully coupled soil-plant-atmosphere system has to be well understood in order to develop reasonable operational applications or recommendations for stakeholders.

For these reasons, a comprehensive analysis of cause-effect relationships and principles that describe the influence of the state of the atmosphere, plants, and soil on different aspects of agricultural production, as well as the nature and importance of feedback between these elements of the system is necessary. Agrometeorological methods therefore use information and data from different key sciences such as soil physics and chemistry, hydrology, meteorology, crop and animal physiology and phenology, agronomy, and others. Observed information is often combined in more or less complex models, focused on various components of system parts such as mass balances (i.e. soil carbon, nutrients, and water), biomass production, crop growth and yield, and crop or pest phenology in order to detect sensitivities or potential responses of the soil-biosphere-atmosphere system.

== Limitations and research ==
Model applications still involve many uncertainties, which calls for further improvements of the description of system processes. A better quality of operational applications at various scales (monitoring, forecasting, warning, recommendations, etc.) is crucial for stakeholders. For example, new methods for spatial applications involve GIS and Remote Sensing for spatial data presentation and generation.

Furthermore, tailor-made products and information transfer are critical to allow effective management decisions in the short and long term. These should cover sustainability and enhancement strategies (including risk management, mitigation and adaptation) considering climate variability and change. Papers are invited addressing these problems in the context of agrometeorological applications in “atmosphere” as an actual and important contribution to the state of the art.
