= Brandýs nad Labem-Stará Boleslav =

- Town
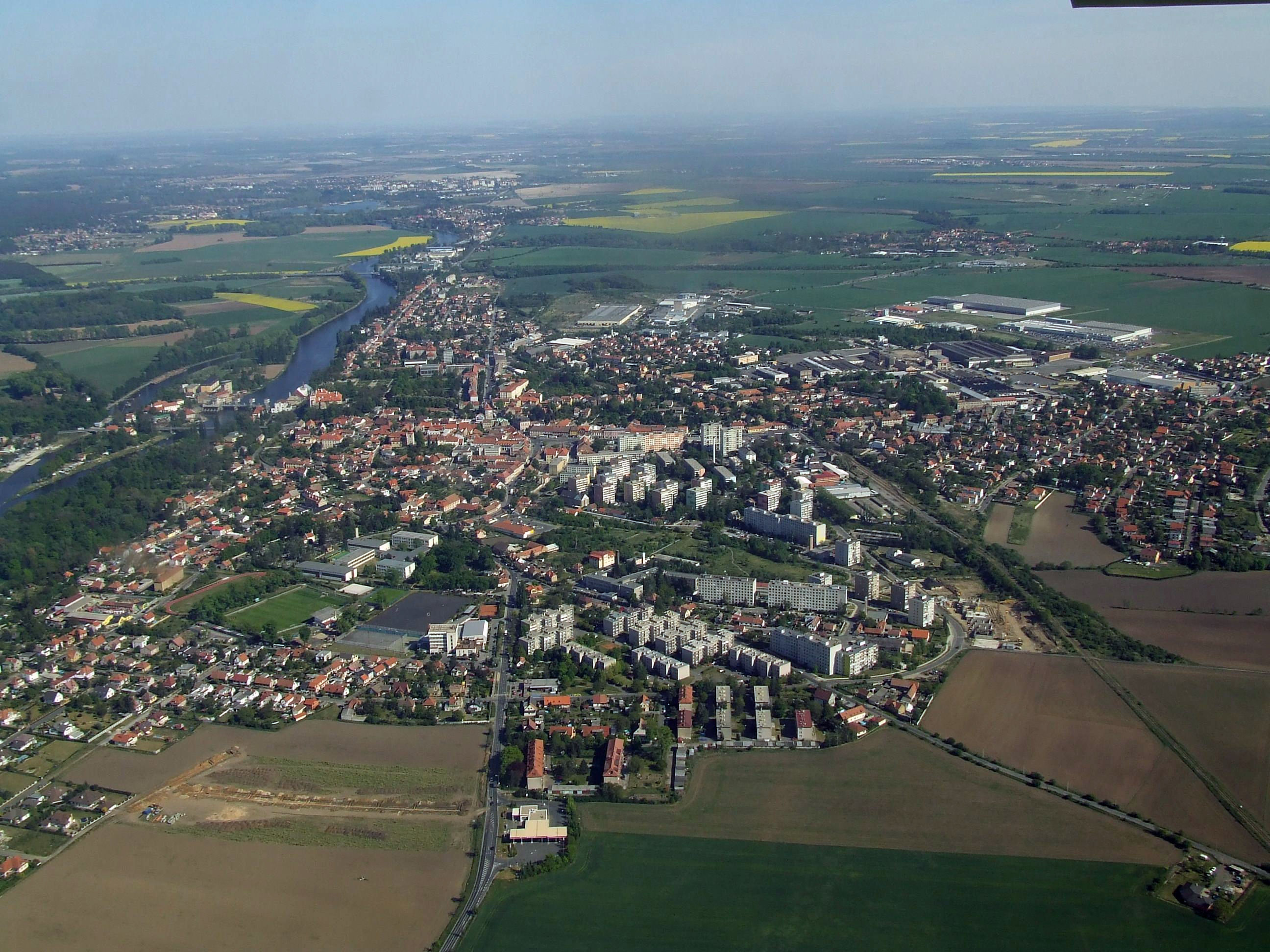
- Aerial view of Brandýs nad Labem

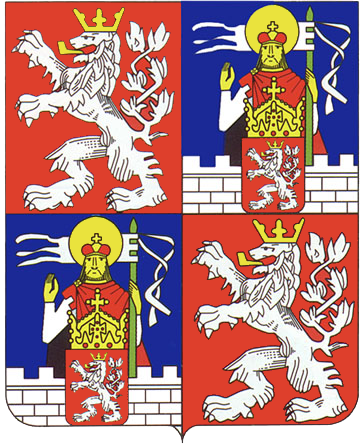
- Coat of arms

- Location in the Czech Republic
- Coordinates: 50°11′22″N 14°40′2″E
- Country: Czech Republic
- Region: Central Bohemian
- District: Prague-East
- First mentioned: 935

Government
  - Mayor: Petr Soukup

Area
  - Total: 22.65 km^{2} (8.75 sq mi)
- Elevation: 169 m (554 ft)

Population (2026-01-01)
  - Total: 20,926
  - Density: 923.9/km^{2} (2,393/sq mi)
- Time zone: UTC+1 (CET)
  - Summer (DST): UTC+2 (CEST)
- Postal code: 250 01
- Website: brandysko.cz

Brandýs nad Labem-Stará Boleslav (Czech pronunciation: [ˈbrandiːs ˈnad labɛm ˈstaraː ˈbolɛslaf]; German: Brandeis and Altbunzlau) is an administratively united pair of towns in Prague-East District in the Central Bohemian Region of the Czech Republic. It has about 21,000 inhabitants and it is the second largest Czech united pair of towns after Frýdek-Místek. It is located on the Elbe River in the Central Elbe Table.

Stará Boleslav is known as an important pilgrimage site, which is the oldest in Bohemia. The historic centres of both Brandýs nad Labem and Stará Boleslav are well preserved and are protected as two urban monument zones. There are many valuable monuments and four of them are protected as national cultural monuments.

== Administrative division ==
Brandýs nad Labem-Stará Boleslav consists of three municipal parts (in brackets population according to the 2021 census):

- Brandýs nad Labem (12,992)
- Stará Boleslav (5,899)
- Popovice (138)

== Etymology ==
According to one theory, the name Brandýs was derived from branný hrad (meaning 'defensive castle'). According to another theory, the name was derived from the personal name Brant. The suffix nad Labem ('upon the Elbe') first appeared in the 16th century.

Boleslav was named after its founder, Duke Boleslaus I. In the 14th century at the latest, the town began to be called Stará Boleslav (lit. 'old Boleslav') to distinguish it from Mladá Boleslav ('young Boleslav', named after Duke Boleslaus II, who was called "the Young One").

In 1960, when the two towns were merged, they refused to give up their names and accept a new one, so the town was named Brandýs nad Labem-Stará Boleslav. It is the second longest name of a municipality in the country (after Nová Ves u Nového Města na Moravě) with 32 letters and spaces.

== Geography ==
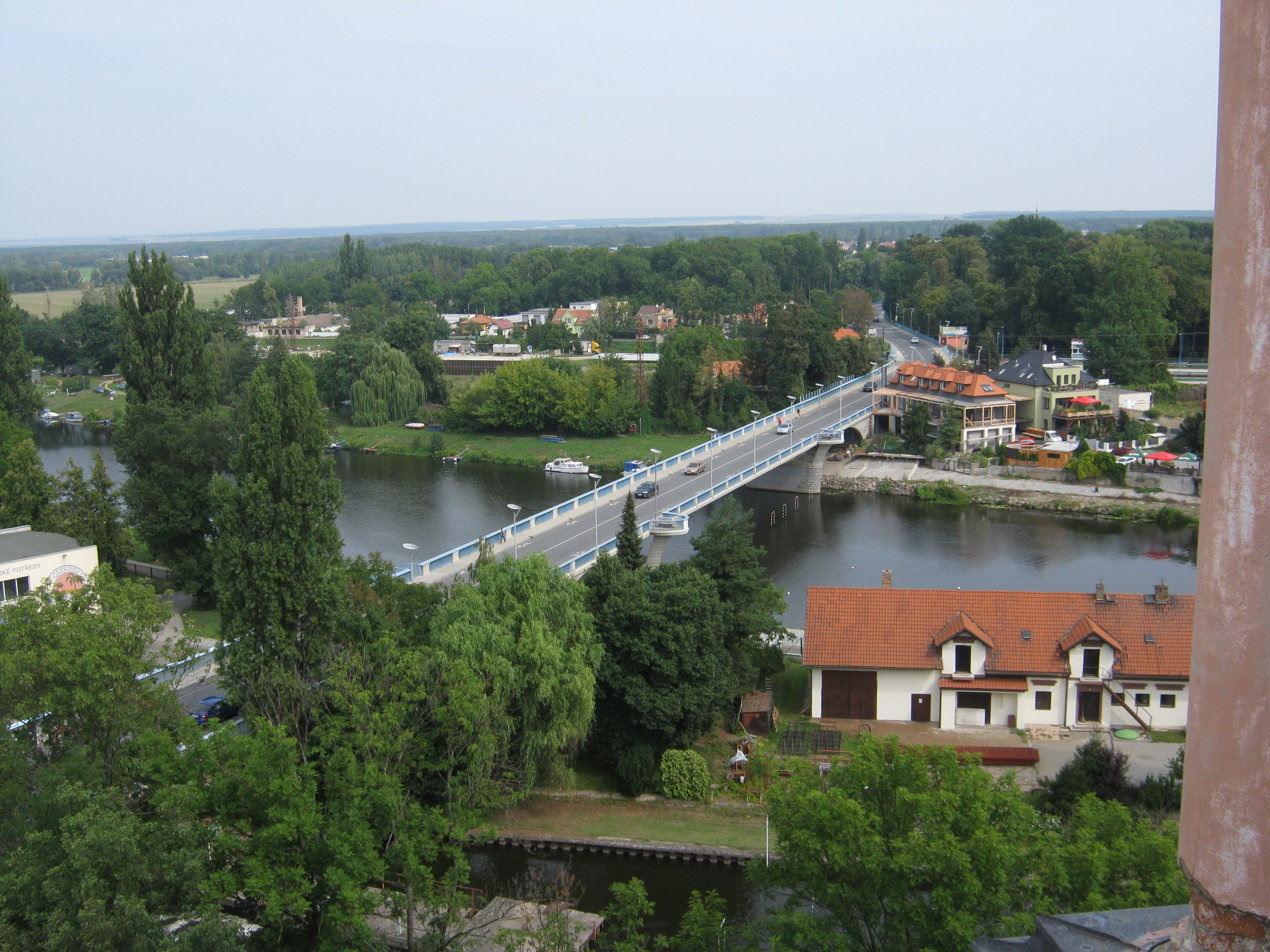
Bridge over the Elbe

Brandýs nad Labem-Stará Boleslav is located about 12 kilometres (7 mi) northeast of Prague. It lies in a flat landscape of the Central Elbe Table plateau, in the heart of the agricultural region of Polabí. Brandýs nad Labem-Stará Boleslav lies upon the Elbe River – Brandýs nad Labem on the left bank and Stará Boleslav on the right bank.

In the northern part of the municipal territory lies Lake Proboštské jezero, which is an artificial lake created by flooding a gravel quarry. It is used for recreational purposes.

== History ==
Around the year 900, during the rule of Duke Spytihněv I, a gord was founded in the area of Stará Boleslav. In the first third of the 10th century, when Duke Boleslaus I resided here, the moats were replaced by stone walls, and the gord was named Boleslav after the duke. At that time, the Church of Saints Cosmas and Damian already stood here. At the gate of the church, Boleslaus I murdered his brother Duke Wenceslaus on 28 September 935 (or 929). After his death, Wenceslaus was proclaimed a saint by the church and became the patron saint of the Czech nation as well as a symbol of moral reinforcement during hard times. Stará Boleslav subsequently became an important pilgrimage site.

After 1039, Duke Bretislav I established a new Romanesque basilica dedicated to St. Wenceslaus at the site of the murder. Moreover, Bretislaus I had the Collegiate Chapter of Saints Cosmas and Damian, the oldest in Bohemia, built next to the basilica in 1052.

Kings Charles IV and Wenceslaus often used to visit the town to hunt in the 14th century, and had new town fortifications built. During the Hussite Wars (1419–1434), the castle in Stará Boleslav was burned down.

Brandýs was founded in the early 14th century around a small castle from the turn of the 13th and 14th centuries. A town with a fortress gradually emerged. At the end of the 15th century, a castle was built in Brandýs, into which a tower from the original fortress was incorporated. During the Thirty Years' War, both Stará Boleslav and Brandýs were almost completely destroyed. In the second half of the 17th century, Stará Boleslav regained its earlier fame through the cult of Madonna.

In the 18th century, both towns began to grow, but were again affected by wars. During the Seven Years' War in 1757, part of Stará Boleslav burned down. Prussian General Hartwig Karl von Wartenberg was killed during the battle. From the middle of the 18th century, manufactories and factories were established in the towns. The most famous was Melichar's factory for agricultural machinery in Brandýs nad Labem, founded in 1883, which achieved fame abroad and had branches in many European cities.

In 1960, the two adjacent towns were joined to form one town of Brandýs nad Labem-Stará Boleslav, after both towns refused to give up their names and accept a new one.

== Demographics ==
Historical population

Year	Pop.	±%
1869	7,291	—
1880	7,945	+9.0%
1890	8,065	+1.5%
1900	8,750	+8.5%
1910	10,681	+22.1%

Year	Pop.	±%
1921	9,882	−7.5%
1930	11,609	+17.5%
1950	12,243	+5.5%
1961	13,292	+8.6%
1970	13,993	+5.3%

Year	Pop.	±%
1980	14,412	+3.0%
1991	15,644	+8.5%
2001	15,298	−2.2%
2011	17,537	+14.6%
2021	19,029	+8.5%

Source: Censuses

== Transport ==
The D10 motorway from Prague to Mladá Boleslav passes through the town.

There are two railways. Brandýs nad Labem lies on the Čelákovice–Neratovice railway line. It is served by three stations and stops. Stará Boleslav lies on a railway line leading from Ústí nad Labem to Lysá nad Labem.

== Culture ==
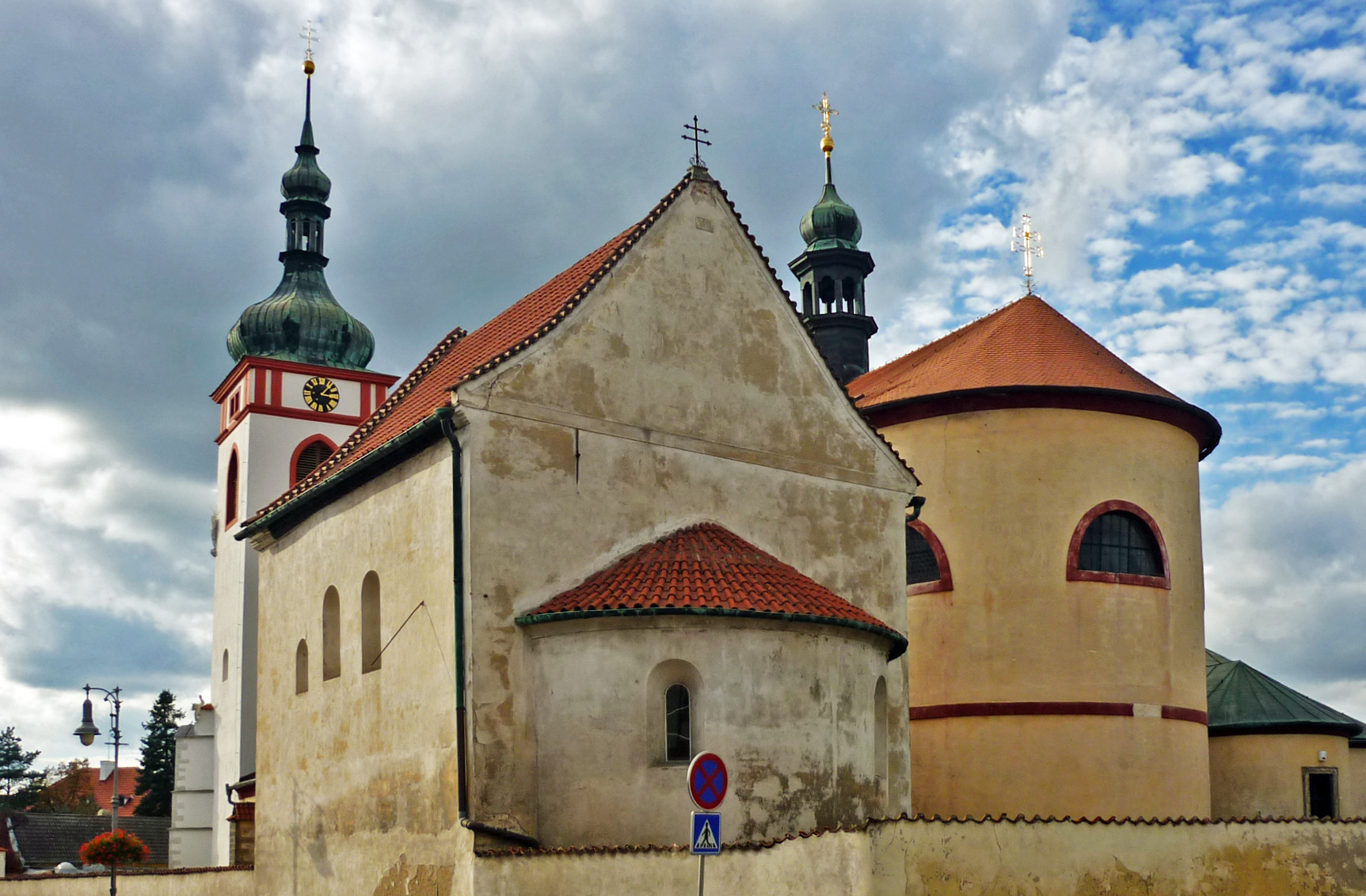
Church of Saint Wenceslaus and Church of Saint Clement

Stará Boleslav is the oldest pilgrimage site in Bohemia. From 2003, the renewed St. Wenceslaus National Pilgrimage in Stará Boleslav takes place here every year on 28 September and is the largest official celebration of St. Wenceslaus Day (Czech Statehood Day). On this occasion, in 2009 Pope Benedict XVI visited Stará Boleslav as the first pope in its history.

== Sights ==
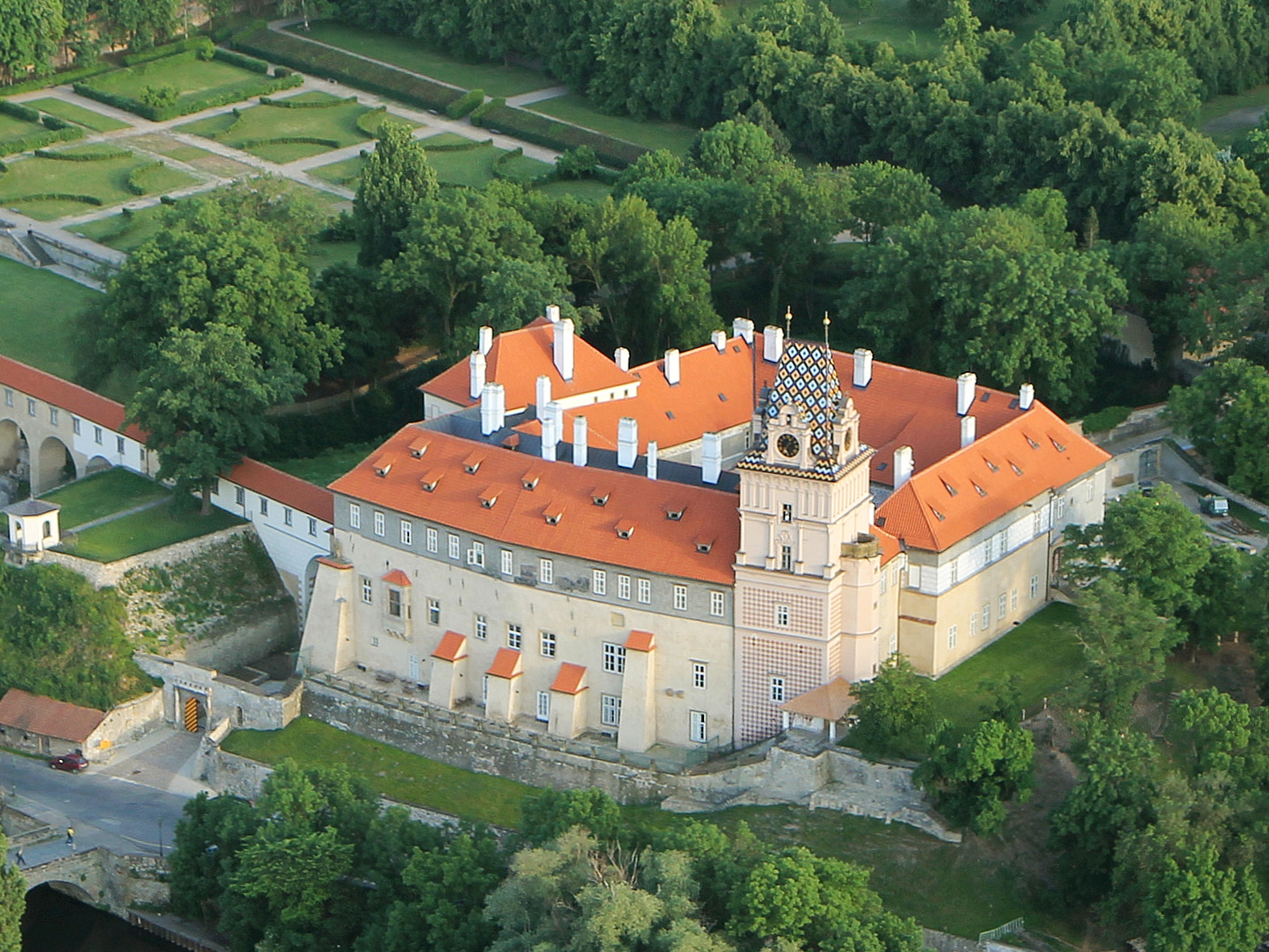
Brandýs nad Labem Castle

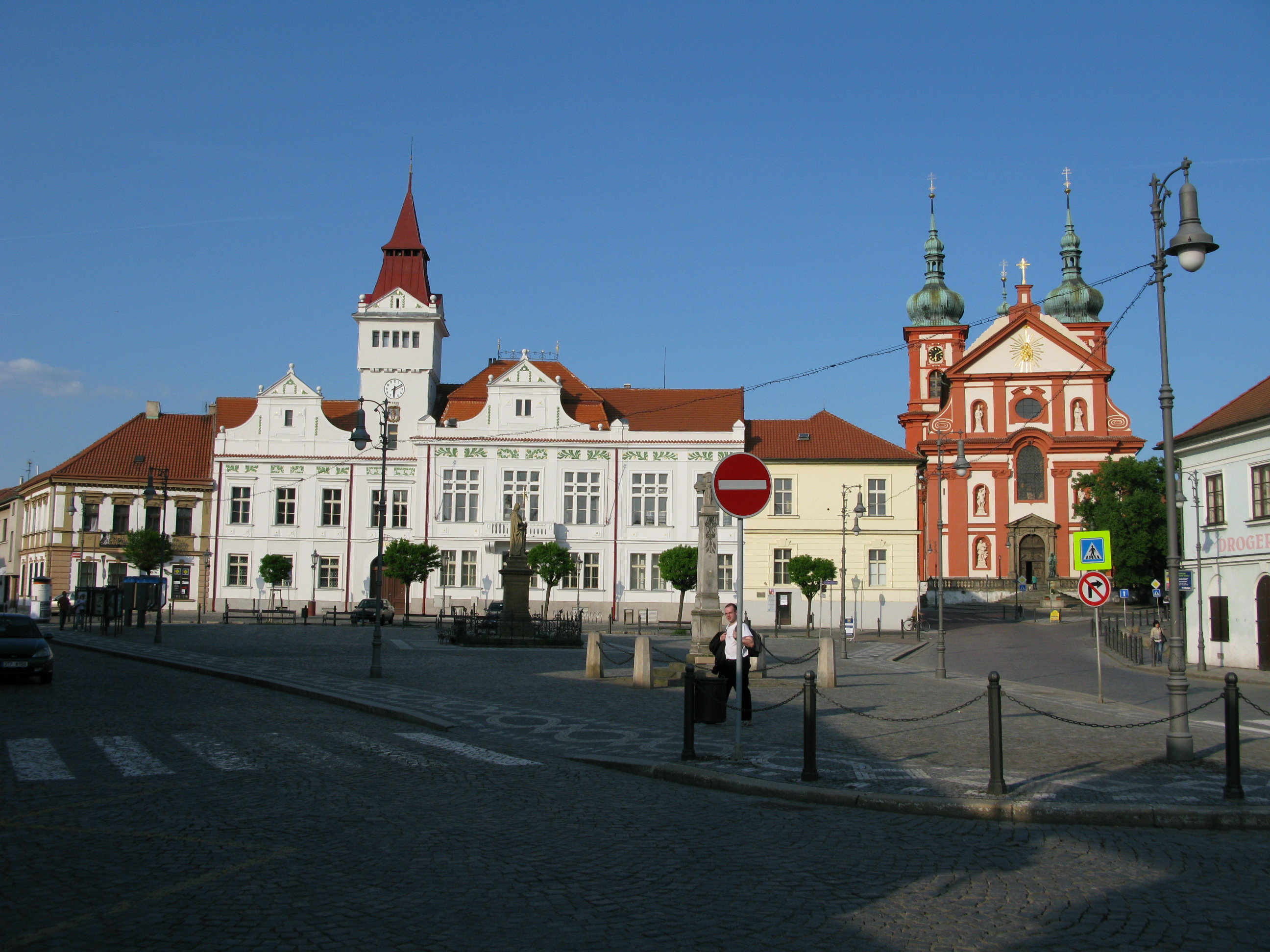
Centre of Stará Boleslav with the Church of the Assumption of the Virgin Mary

The town is rich in monuments. There are several important objects, protected as national cultural monuments: Church of the Assumption of the Virgin Mary, Church of Saint Wenceslaus and Church of Saint Clement, Brandýs nad Labem Castle, and Palladium of the Bohemian land.

Brandýs nad Labem Castle was originally a medieval Gothic castle, rebuilt into the Renaissance residence in the mid-16th century. The castle is characterised by an exceptionally extensive sgraffito decoration and a park with a preserved Renaissance layout. After Prague Castle, the castle was one of the most important Habsburg residences in the Czech lands. Between 1547 and 1918, it was visited by all the monarchs of the Habsburg dynasty.

The Church of Saint Wenceslaus and the Church of Saint Clement are a pair of important neighbouring Romanesque churches. The area of churches is located in the place where the gord with the old Romanesque Church of Saints Cosmas and Damian stood. The Church of Saint Wenceslaus is a three-nave basilica, founded in 1039 by Duke Bretislav I and consecrated in 1046. At the end of the 11th century, the adjoining Church of Saint Clement was built. It is valuable for its Romanesque frescos from the latter half of the 12th century depicting scenes from St. Clement's life and martyrdom.

The Church of the Assumption of the Virgin Mary is a large early Baroque church, associated with many notable artists. It was built in 1613–1623. It is located on the site of the older building of the Church of the Virgin Mary and Saint George, which was first mentioned around 1098. Due to the Thirty Years' War, the first tower was built only in 1674–1675 and the second, according to the design of Kilian Ignaz Dientzenhofer, in 1750–1760. The main altar was made in the years 1717–1723 according to the design of František Maxmilián Kaňka. The sculptural decoration comes from the workshop of Matthias Braun.

The main altar of the Church of the Assumption of the Virgin Mary contains a Gothic relief of Madonna and Child called Palladium of the Bohemian land. It probably dates from the 1380s and according to legend, its origin is connected with Saints Ludmila and Wenceslaus. It is among the most valuable movable monuments in the country. In the 17th–20th centuries, many copies were made, located in churches all over the Czech Republic.

A town gate, which is a remnant of medieval fortifications of Stará Boleslav, has been preserved. Other monuments in Stará Boleslav include several notable Baroque buildings: the Chapel of Blessed Podiven from 1738, designed by K. I. Dientzenhofer; the Jesuit college from the second half of the 17th century; the provost's seat built in 1728–1734; and the chapter deanery built in 1710–1712.

== Notable people ==
- Jan Tesánek (1728–1788), scholar and author of scientific literature
- Karel Šebor (1843–1903), opera composer
- Maria Theresa of Austria (1862–1933), archduchess
- Leopold Salvator of Austria (1863–1931), archduke and Prince of Tuscany
- Bohumil Honzátko (1875–1950), gymnast and long-distance runner
- Antonín Bečvář (1901–1965), astronomer
- Rudolf Kirs (1915–1963), cellist
- David Novotný (born 1969), actor
- David Rikl (born 1971), tennis player
- Oto Biederman (born 1973), serial killer
- Tomáš Votava (born 1974), footballer
- Marek Matějovský (born 1981), footballer
- Ondřej Synek (born 1982), rower, Olympic medalist
- Michaela Uhrová (born 1982), basketball player
- Jan Jirka (born 1993), sprinter
- Amálie Hilgertová (born 1997), slalom canoeist

== Twin towns – sister cities ==
Brandýs nad Labem-Stará Boleslav is twinned with:

- Dunaivtsi, Ukraine
- Gödöllő, Hungary
- Montescudaio, Italy
- Turek, Poland

== Gallery ==
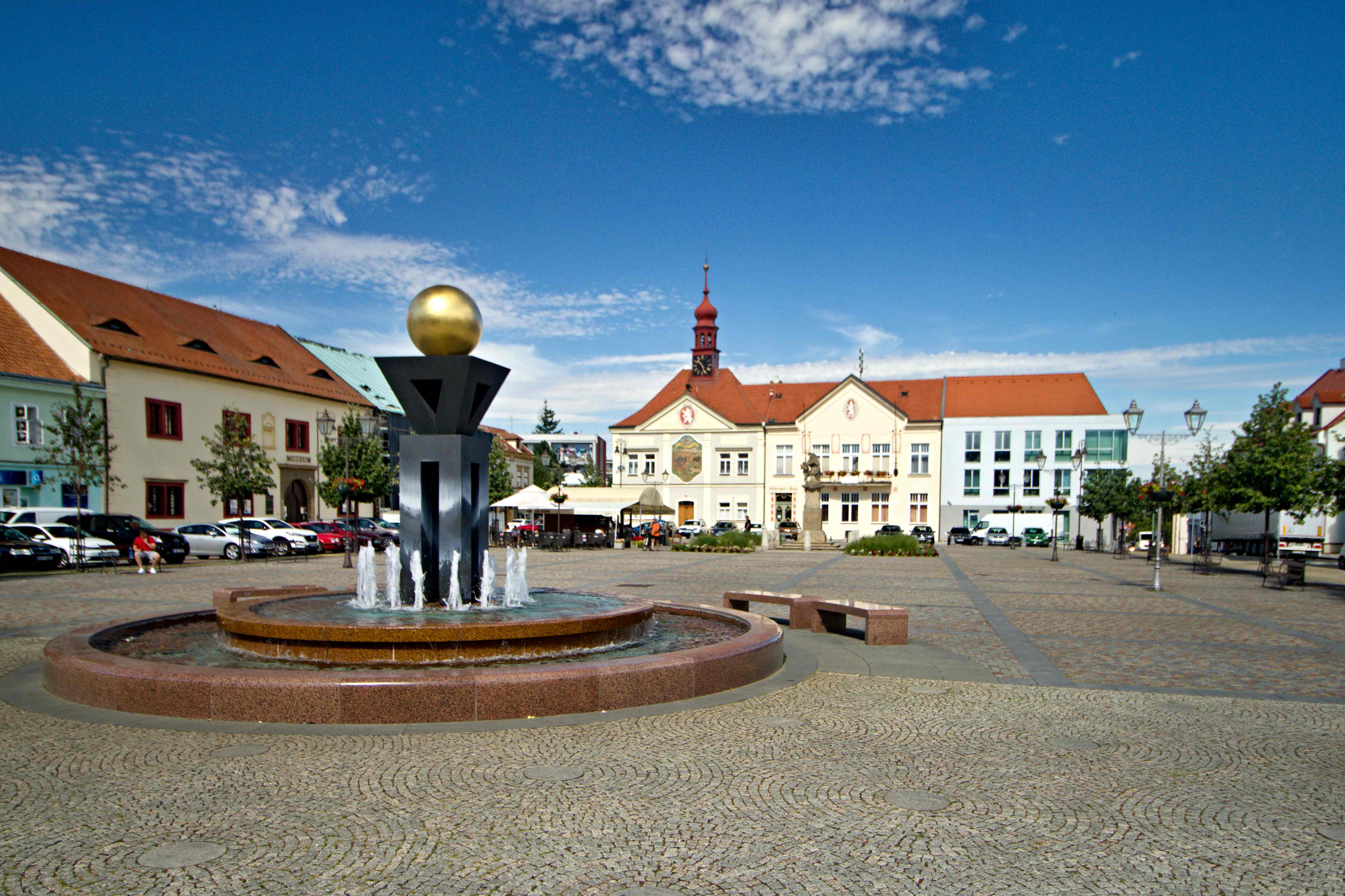
The square Masarykovo náměstí in Brandýs nad Labem

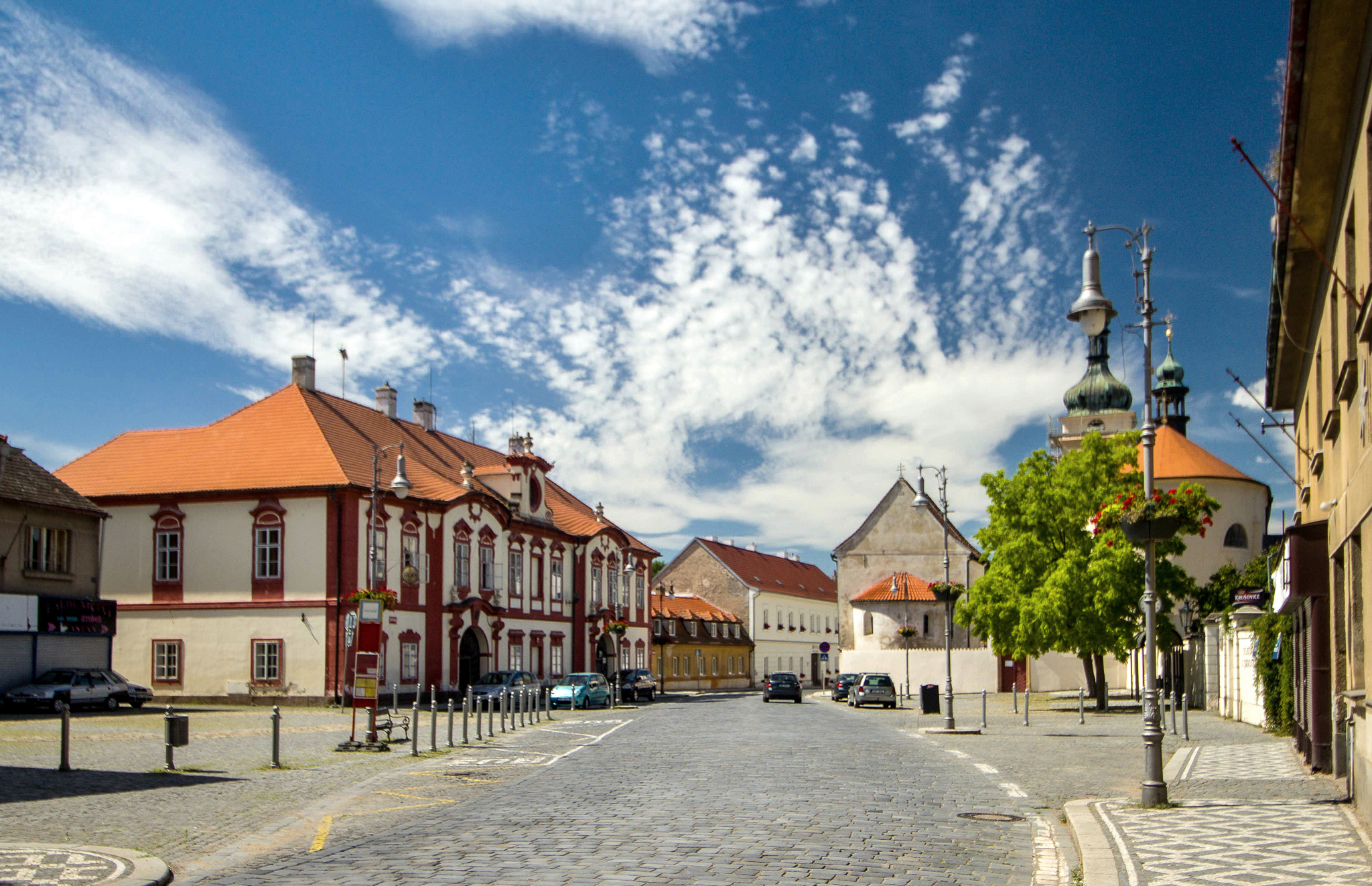
The square Náměstí Sv. Václava in Stará Boleslav

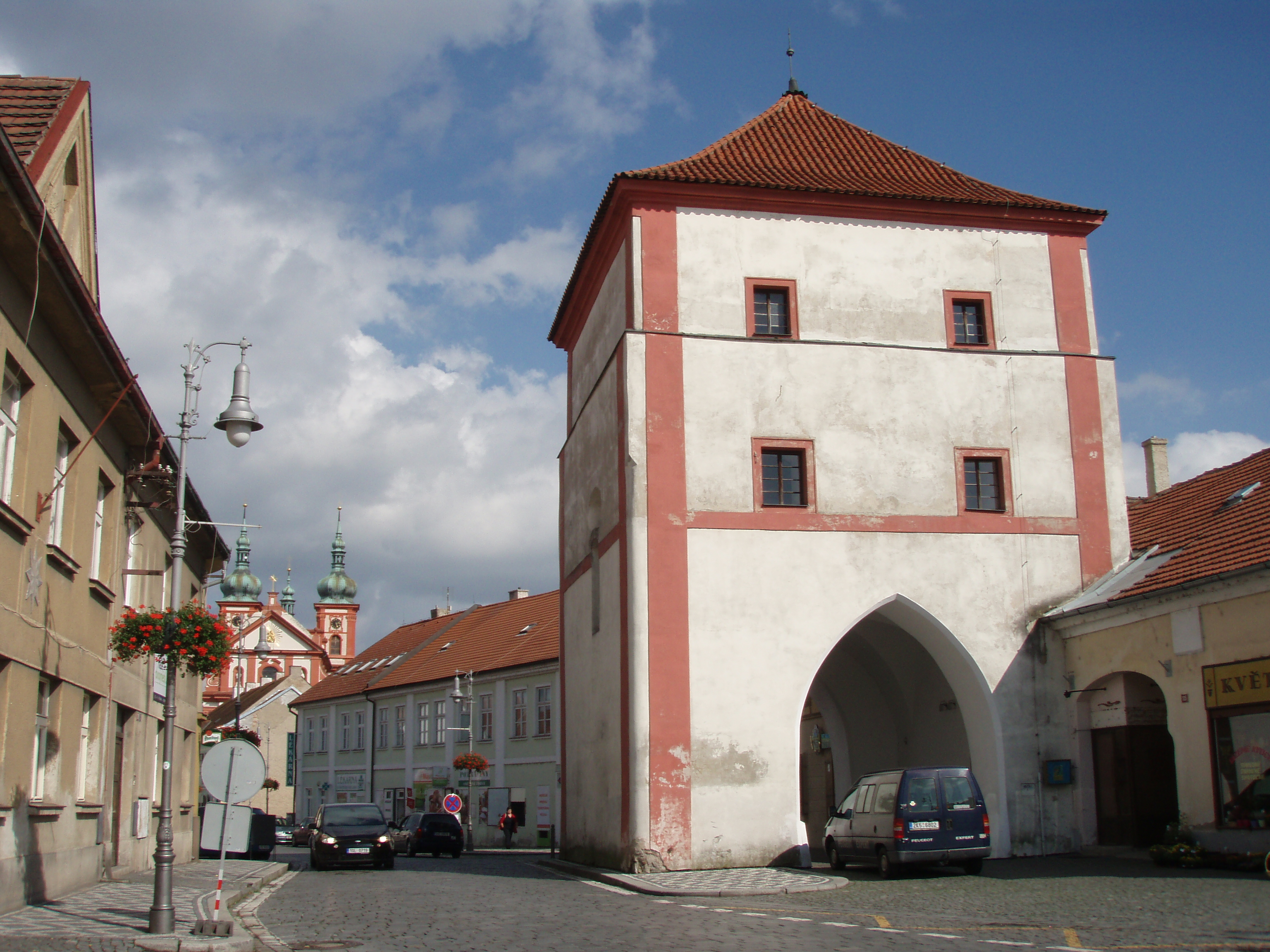
Medieval tower in Stará Boleslav

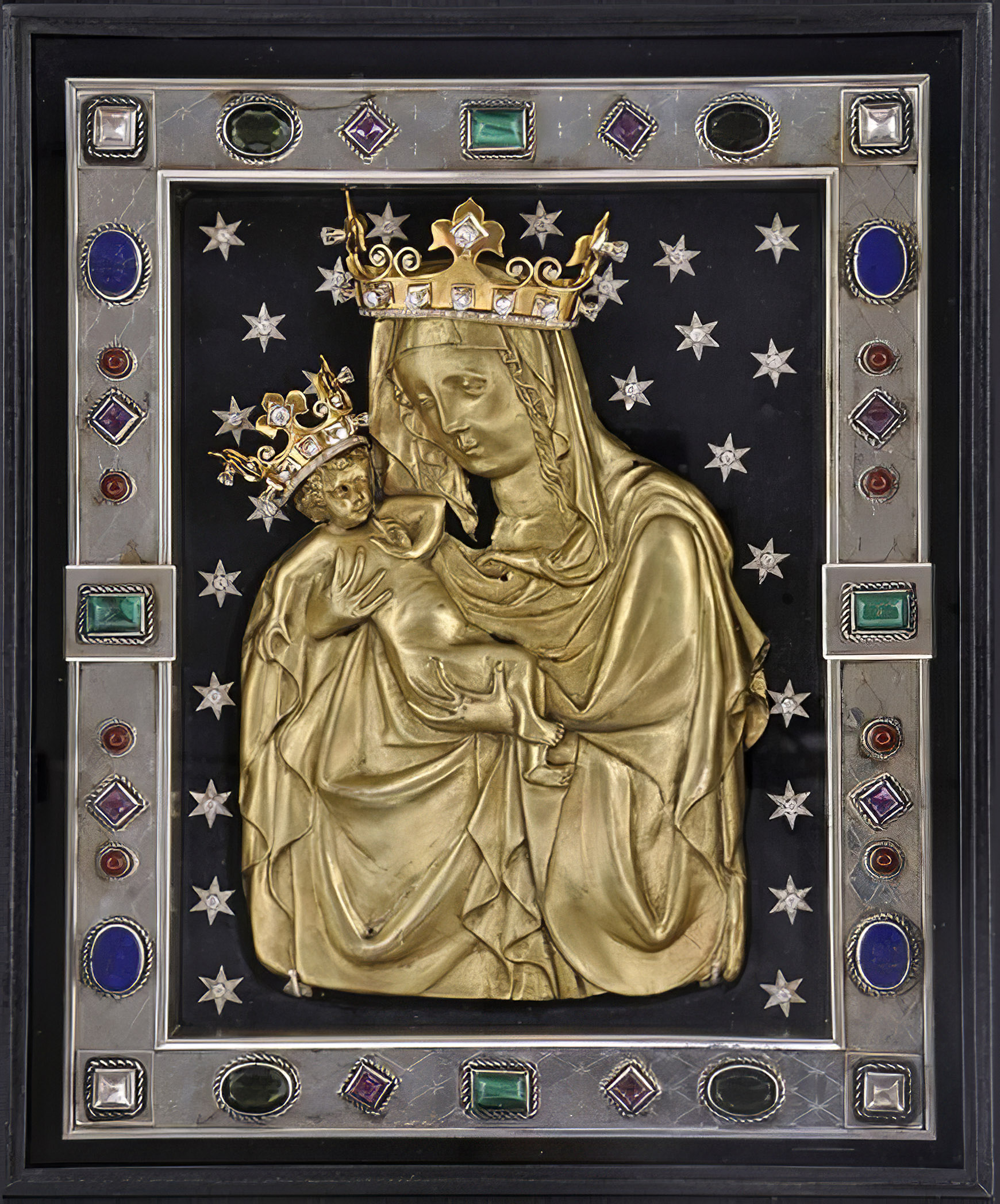
Palladium of the Bohemian land
