= Žitenice =

- Municipality
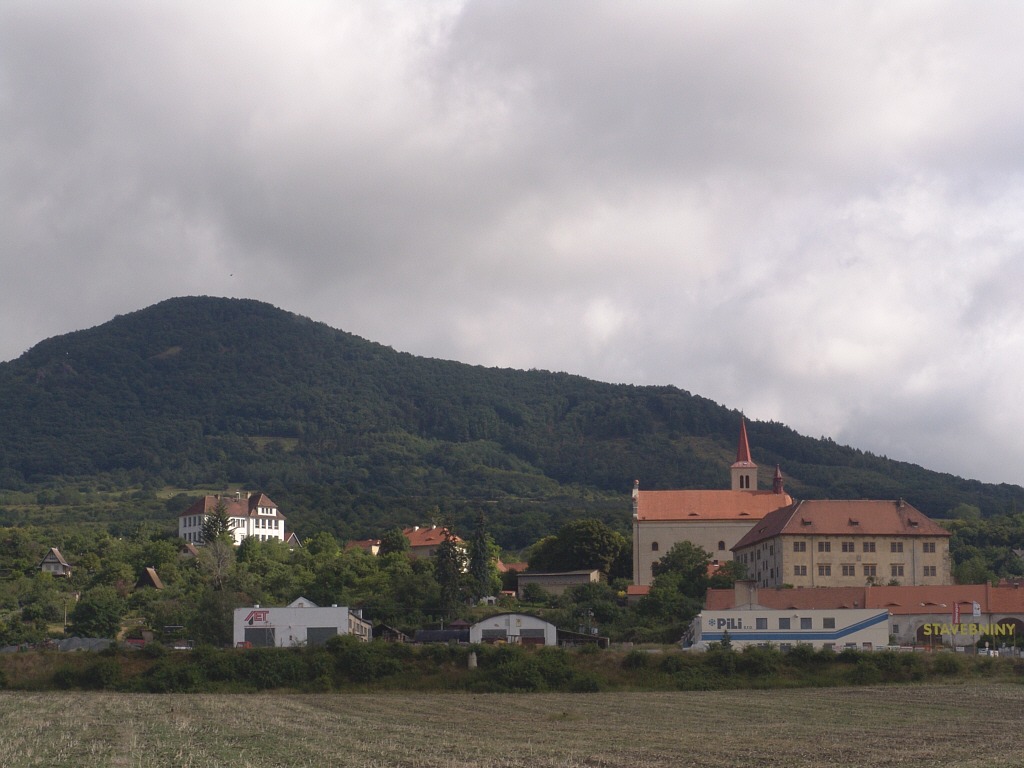
- Church and castle in Žitěnice

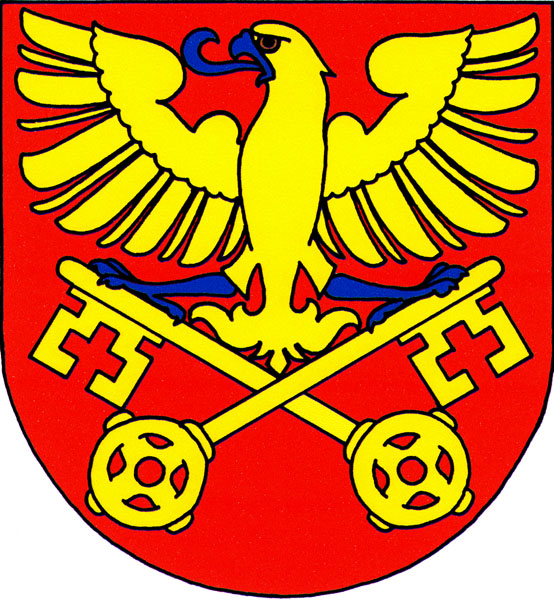
- Flag Coat of arms

- Location in the Czech Republic
- Coordinates: 50°33′19″N 14°9′24″E
- Country: Czech Republic
- Region: Ústí nad Labem
- District: Litoměřice
- First mentioned: 1057

Area
  - Total: 13.08 km^{2} (5.05 sq mi)
- Elevation: 224 m (735 ft)

Population (2026-01-01)
  - Total: 1,656
  - Density: 126.6/km^{2} (327.9/sq mi)
- Time zone: UTC+1 (CET)
  - Summer (DST): UTC+2 (CEST)
- Postal code: 411 41
- Website: www.obeczitenice.cz

Žitenice (German: Schüttenitz) is a municipality and village in Litoměřice District in the Ústí nad Labem Region of the Czech Republic. It has about 1,700 inhabitants.

Žitenice lies approximately 4 kilometres (2 mi) north-east of Litoměřice, 15 km (9 mi) south-east of Ústí nad Labem, and 56 km (35 mi) north of Prague.

== Administrative division ==
Žitenice consists of three municipal parts (in brackets population according to the 2021 census):

- Žitenice (838)
- Pohořany (476)
- Skalice (293)

== Demographics ==
Historical population
Year	Pop.	±%
1869	1,715	—
1880	1,857	+8.3%
1890	1,841	−0.9%
1900	1,953	+6.1%
1910	2,135	+9.3%
1921	1,897	−11.1%
1930	1,985	+4.6%
1950	1,307	−34.2%
1961	1,491	+14.1%
1970	1,496	+0.3%
1980	1,358	−9.2%
1991	1,171	−13.8%
2001	1,304	+11.4%
2011	1,500	+15.0%
2021	1,607	+7.1%
Source: Censuses
