= Budíkovice =

- Seal

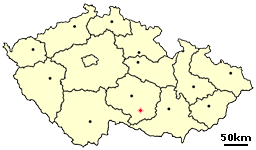
- Coordinates: 49°15′20″N 15°52′21″E
- Country: Czech Republic
- Region: Vysočina
- District: Třebíč

Area
  - Total: 5.27 km^{2} (2.03 sq mi)

Population (2021)
  - Total: 245
  - Density: 46/km^{2} (120/sq mi)

Budíkovice (Czech pronunciation: [ˈbudikovice]) is a small village in the Czech republic, approximately 4 kilometers north of the town of Třebíč. Budíkovice is in the district of Třebíč.

The village is home to a chapel, a small swimming pool and notably just a single bus stop.

== Demographics ==
Historical population
Year	Pop.	±%
1869	182	—
1880	186	+2.2%
1890	178	−4.3%
1900	176	−1.1%
1910	211	+19.9%
1921	210	−0.5%
1930	209	−0.5%
1950	182	−12.9%
1961	204	+12.1%
1970	193	−5.4%
1980	225	+16.6%
1991	204	−9.3%
2001	199	−2.5%
2011	255	+28.1%
2021	245	−3.9%
Source: Censuses
