= Tismice =

- Municipality
- Basilica of the Assumption

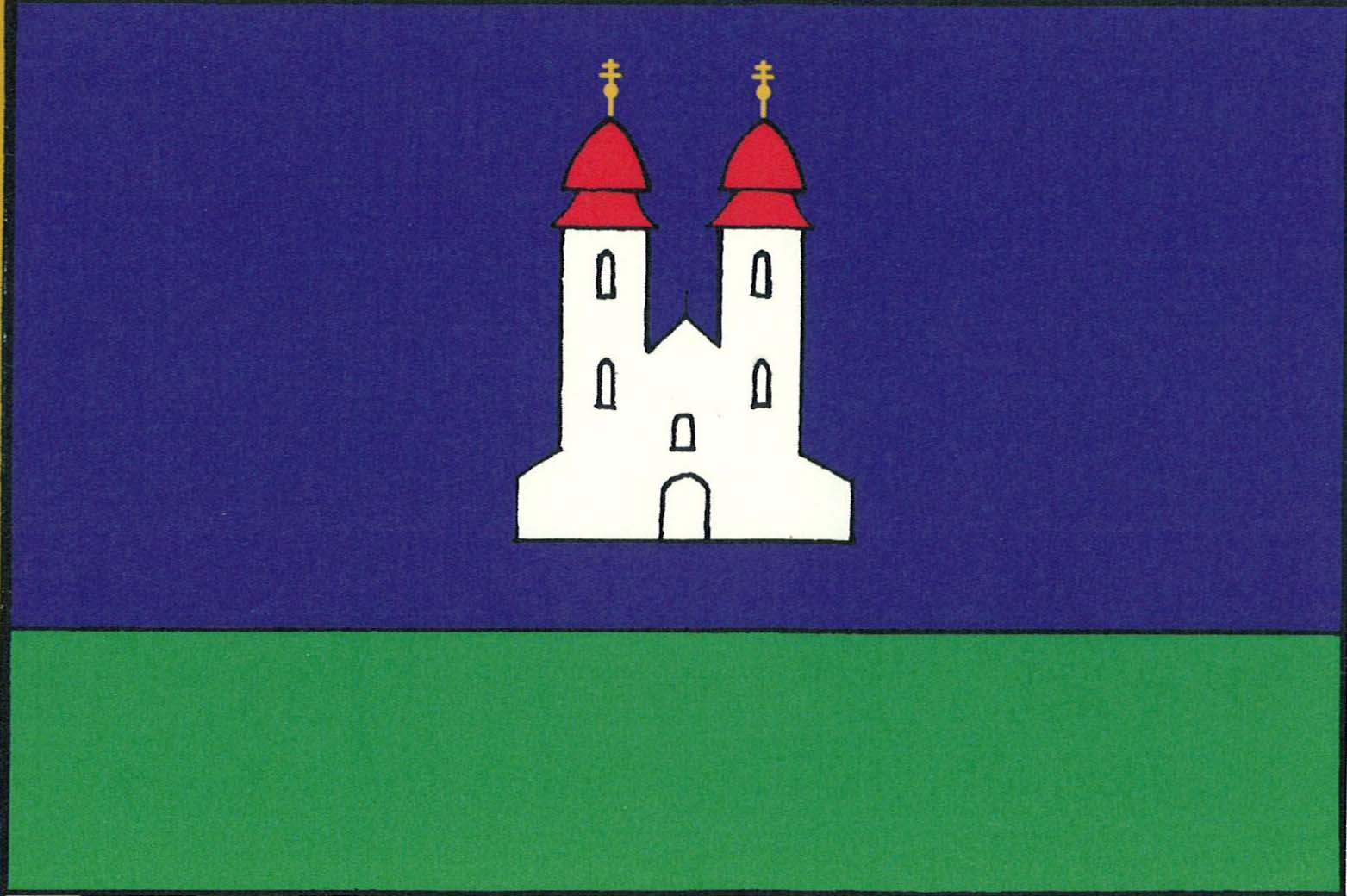
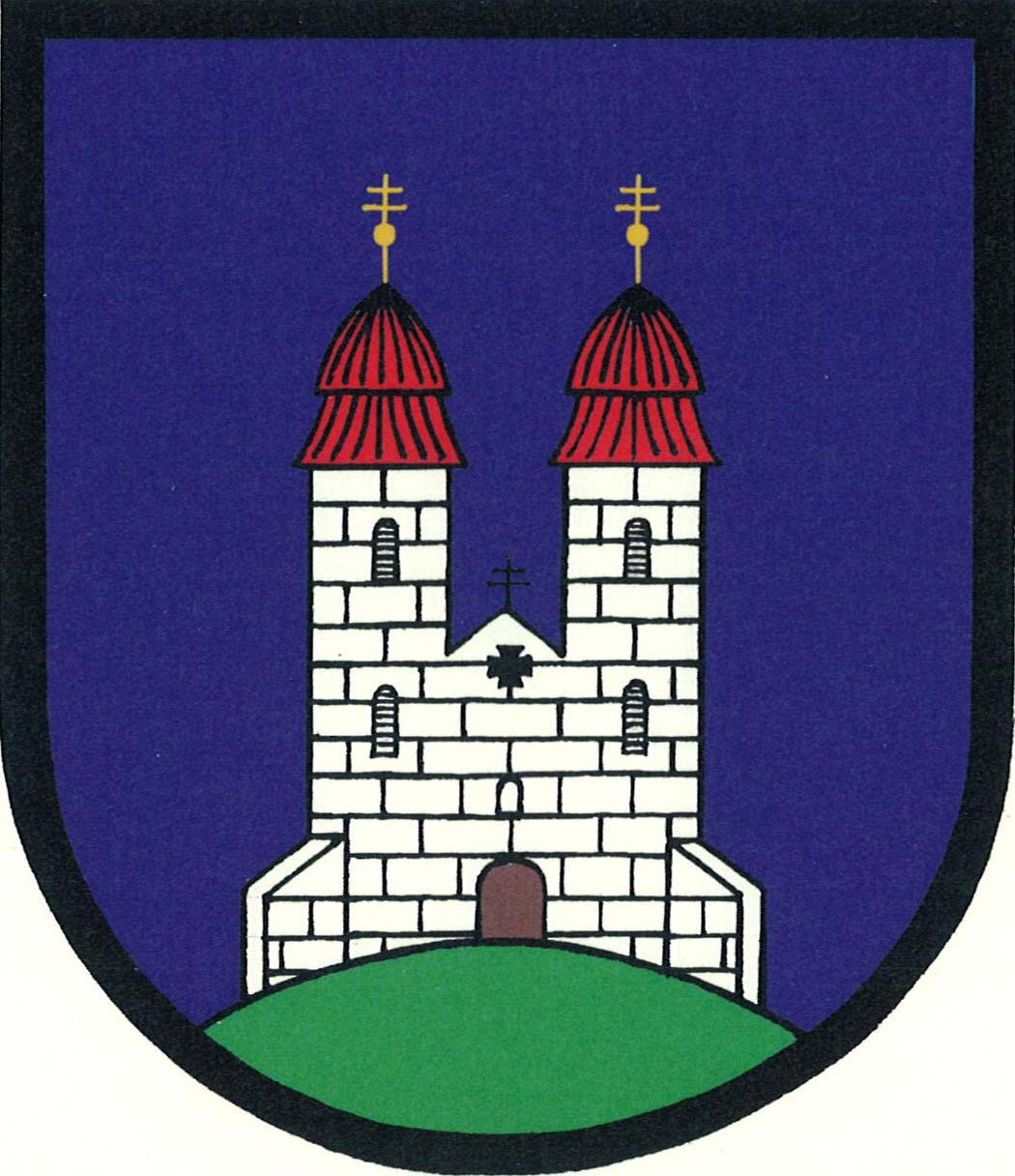
- Flag Coat of arms

- Location in the Czech Republic
- Coordinates: 50°3′22″N 14°49′16″E
- Country: Czech Republic
- Region: Central Bohemian
- District: Kolín
- First mentioned: 1295

Area
  - Total: 7.50 km^{2} (2.90 sq mi)
- Elevation: 240 m (790 ft)

Population (2026-01-01)
  - Total: 587
  - Density: 78.3/km^{2} (203/sq mi)
- Time zone: UTC+1 (CET)
  - Summer (DST): UTC+2 (CEST)
- Postal code: 282 01
- Website: www.tismice.cz

Tismice is a municipality and village in Kolín District in the Central Bohemian Region of the Czech Republic. It has about 600 inhabitants.

== Administrative division ==
Tismice consists of two municipal parts (in brackets population according to the 2021 census):

- Tismice (447)
- Limuzy (111)

== Demographics ==
Historical population
Year	Pop.	±%
1869	753	—
1880	846	+12.4%
1890	865	+2.2%
1900	841	−2.8%
1910	880	+4.6%
1921	849	−3.5%
1930	861	+1.4%
1950	618	−28.2%
1961	554	−10.4%
1970	508	−8.3%
1980	449	−11.6%
1991	381	−15.1%
2001	382	+0.3%
2011	507	+32.7%
2021	558	+10.1%
Source: Censuses
