= Sazená =

- Municipality
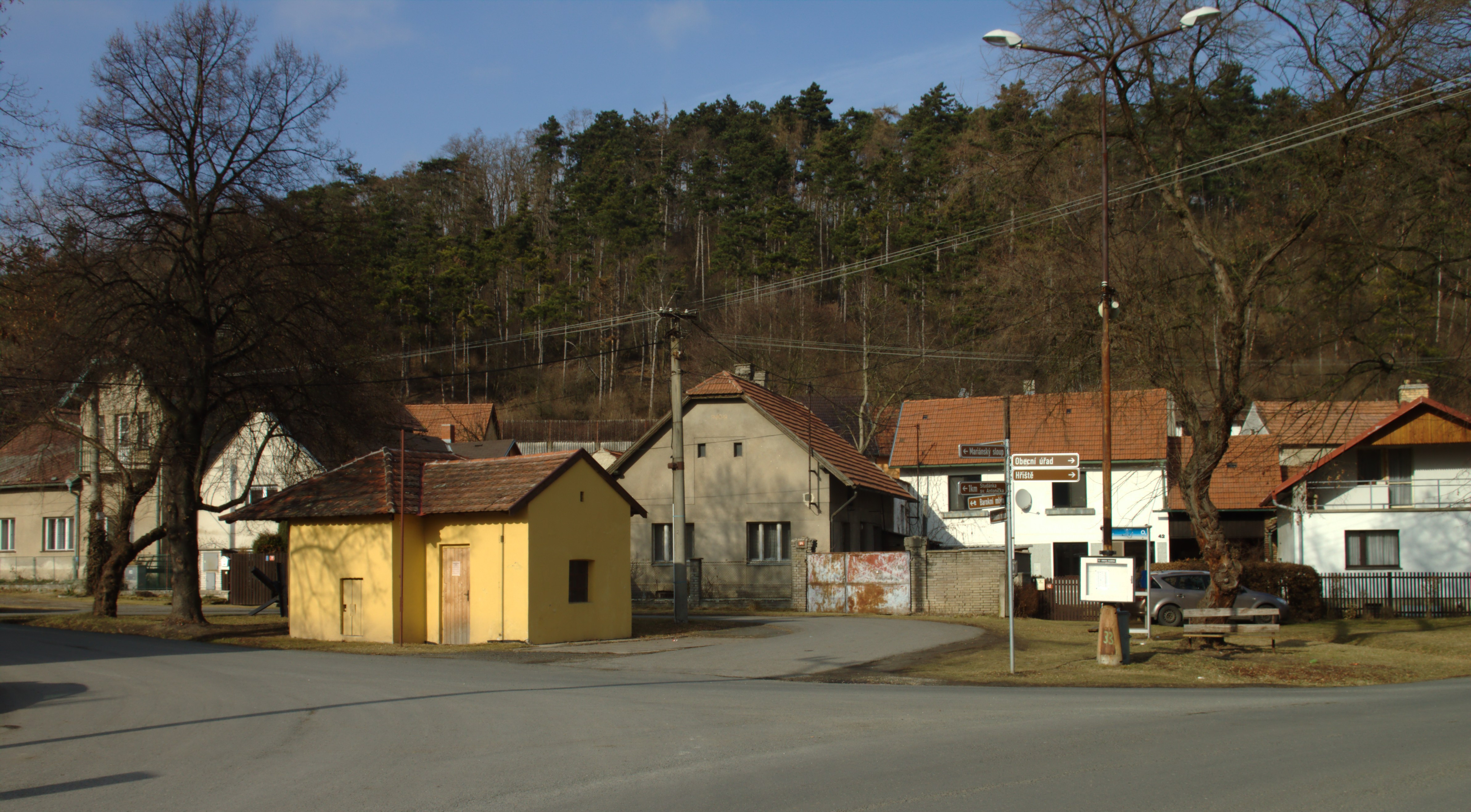
- Centre of Sazená

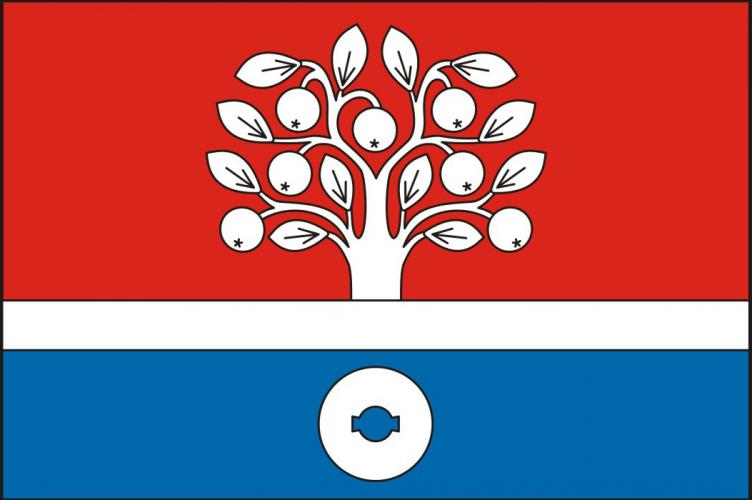
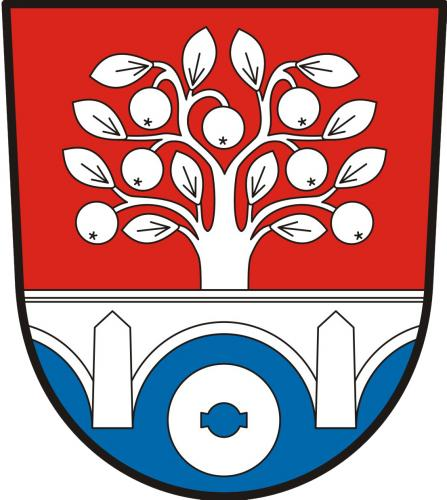
- Flag Coat of arms

- Location in the Czech Republic
- Coordinates: 50°18′19″N 14°17′14″E
- Country: Czech Republic
- Region: Central Bohemian
- District: Kladno
- First mentioned: 1295

Area
  - Total: 6.78 km^{2} (2.62 sq mi)
- Elevation: 176 m (577 ft)

Population (2026-01-01)
  - Total: 365
  - Density: 53.8/km^{2} (139/sq mi)
- Time zone: UTC+1 (CET)
  - Summer (DST): UTC+2 (CEST)
- Postal code: 273 24
- Website: www.sazena.cz

Sazená is a municipality and village in Kladno District in the Central Bohemian Region of the Czech Republic. It has about 400 inhabitants.

== Demographics ==
Historical population
Year	Pop.	±%
1869	594	—
1880	611	+2.9%
1890	635	+3.9%
1900	664	+4.6%
1910	627	−5.6%
1921	587	−6.4%
1930	565	−3.7%
1950	410	−27.4%
1961	391	−4.6%
1970	366	−6.4%
1980	300	−18.0%
1991	269	−10.3%
2001	248	−7.8%
2011	332	+33.9%
2021	363	+9.3%
Source: Censuses
