= Chržín =

- Municipality
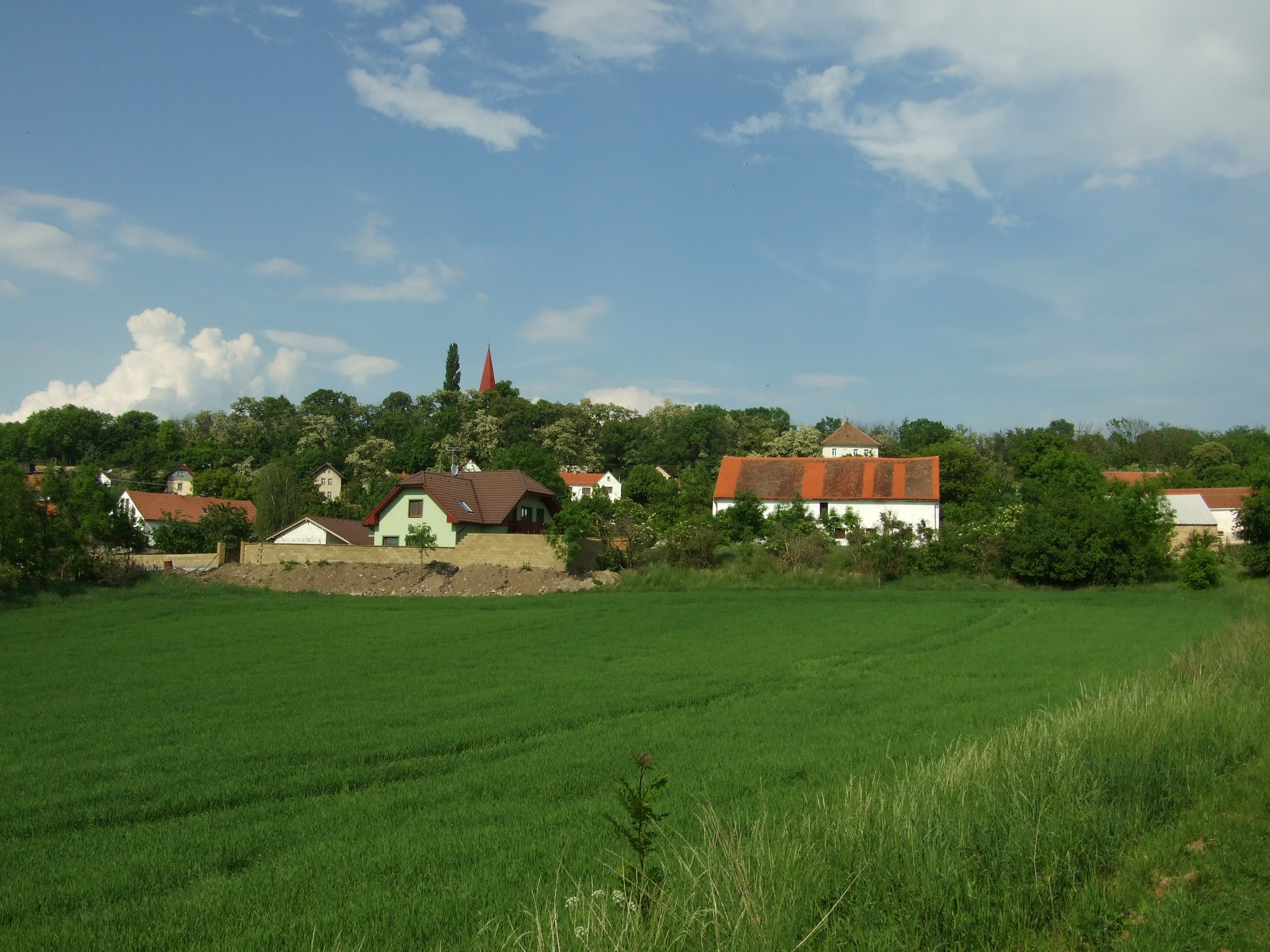
- View from the west

- Location in the Czech Republic
- Coordinates: 50°17′44″N 14°16′13″E
- Country: Czech Republic
- Region: Central Bohemian
- District: Kladno
- First mentioned: 1292

Area
  - Total: 8.71 km^{2} (3.36 sq mi)
- Elevation: 197 m (646 ft)

Population (2026-01-01)
  - Total: 315
  - Density: 36.2/km^{2} (93.7/sq mi)
- Time zone: UTC+1 (CET)
  - Summer (DST): UTC+2 (CEST)
- Postal code: 273 24
- Website: www.chrzin.cz

Chržín (Czech pronunciation: [ˈxr̩ʒiːn]) is a municipality and village in Kladno District in the Central Bohemian Region of the Czech Republic. It has about 300 inhabitants.

== Administrative division ==
Chržín consists of three municipal parts (in brackets population according to the 2021 census):

- Chržín (159)
- Budihostice (108)
- Dolní Kamenice (48)

== Demographics ==
Historical population
Year	Pop.	±%
1869	786	—
1880	648	−17.6%
1890	737	+13.7%
1900	677	−8.1%
1910	710	+4.9%
1921	727	+2.4%
1930	605	−16.8%
1950	505	−16.5%
1961	458	−9.3%
1970	364	−20.5%
1980	283	−22.3%
1991	213	−24.7%
2001	214	+0.5%
2011	253	+18.2%
2021	315	+24.5%
Source: Censuses
