= Ignatz Mühlwenzel =

Ignatz Heinrich Mühlwenzel
- Born: c. 1690; Eger, Kingdom of Bohemia
- Died: November 7, 1766; Breslau, Kingdom of Prussia
- Scientific career
- Fields: Mathematics
- Workplaces: University of Prague, Bohemia; University of Breslau, Prussia (now University of Wrocław, Poland)

Ignatz Heinrich Mühlwenzel (c. 1690 – 11 July 1766) was a Czech mathematician.

== Life ==
Ignatz Heinrich Mühlwenzel (referred to in Biographisches Lexikon des Kaiserthums Oesterreich as Heinrich Mühlwenzel) was a member of the Jesuit order and a professor of mathematics at the University of Prague. He was of minority German ethnicity in western border of the Kingdom of Bohemia. He was a skilled optician who ground lenses for his own telescopes. Mühlwenzel is notable because his mathematical "descendants," which include Johann Radon, number more than 10,000.

In 1736, he published Fundamenta mathematica ex arithmetica, geometria et trigonometria.
