= Tuklaty =

- Municipality
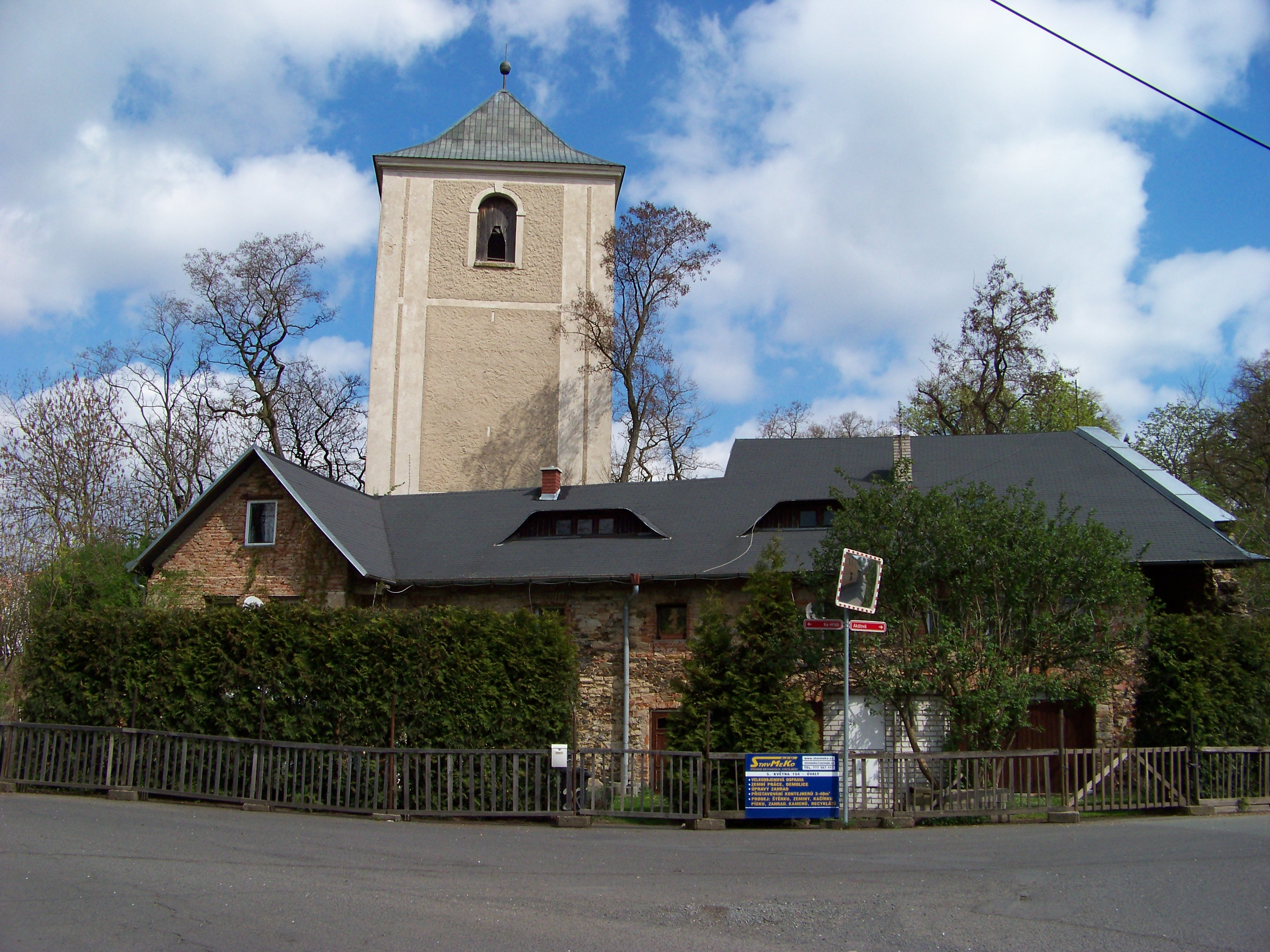
- Bell tower

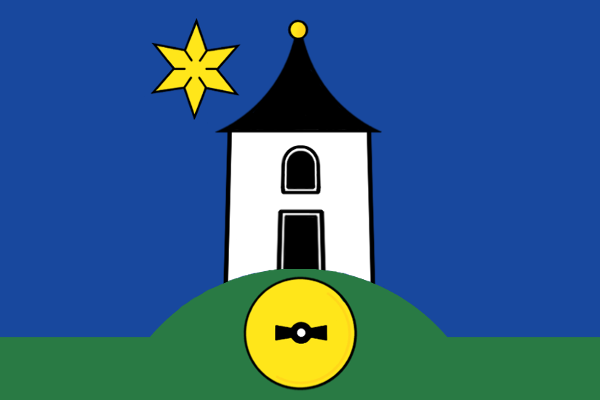
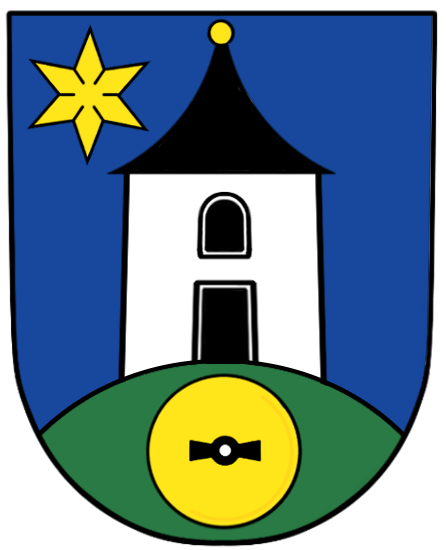
- Flag Coat of arms

- Location in the Czech Republic
- Coordinates: 50°5′5″N 14°46′10″E
- Country: Czech Republic
- Region: Central Bohemian
- District: Kolín
- First mentioned: 1207

Area
  - Total: 8.17 km^{2} (3.15 sq mi)
- Elevation: 248 m (814 ft)

Population (2026-01-01)
  - Total: 1,118
  - Density: 137/km^{2} (354/sq mi)
- Time zone: UTC+1 (CET)
  - Summer (DST): UTC+2 (CEST)
- Postal code: 250 82
- Website: tuklaty.cz

Tuklaty is a municipality and village in Kolín District in the Central Bohemian Region of the Czech Republic. It has about 1,100 inhabitants.

== Administrative division ==
Tuklaty consists of two municipal parts (in brackets population according to the 2021 census):

- Tuklaty (736)
- Tlustovousy (370)

== Etymology ==
The initial name of Tuklaty was Tukleci. This name was derived from the Czech words tu ('here') and klečet ('kneel'), meaning "the village of people who kneel here". The name gradually evolved into the form Tuklaty, which first appeared in the 18th century.

== Geography ==
Tuklaty is located about 31 kilometres (19 mi) west of Kolín and 18 km (11 mi) east of Prague. It lies in an agricultural landscape in the Prague Plateau. The highest point is at 273 m (896 ft) above sea level. The Výmola Stream flows through the northern part of the municipality.

== History ==
The first written mention of Tuklaty is from 1207. Tlustovousy was first mentioned in 1227.

== Demographics ==
Historical population

Year	Pop.	±%
1869	580	—
1880	695	+19.8%
1890	681	−2.0%
1900	643	−5.6%
1910	695	+8.1%

Year	Pop.	±%
1921	686	−1.3%
1930	958	+39.7%
1950	764	−20.3%
1961	775	+1.4%
1970	710	−8.4%

Year	Pop.	±%
1980	699	−1.5%
1991	693	−0.9%
2001	685	−1.2%
2011	842	+22.9%
2021	1,106	+31.4%

Source: Censuses

== Transport ==
The I/12 road from Prague to Kolín runs along the southern municipal border.

Tuklaty is located on the railway line Prague–Kolín.

== Sights ==
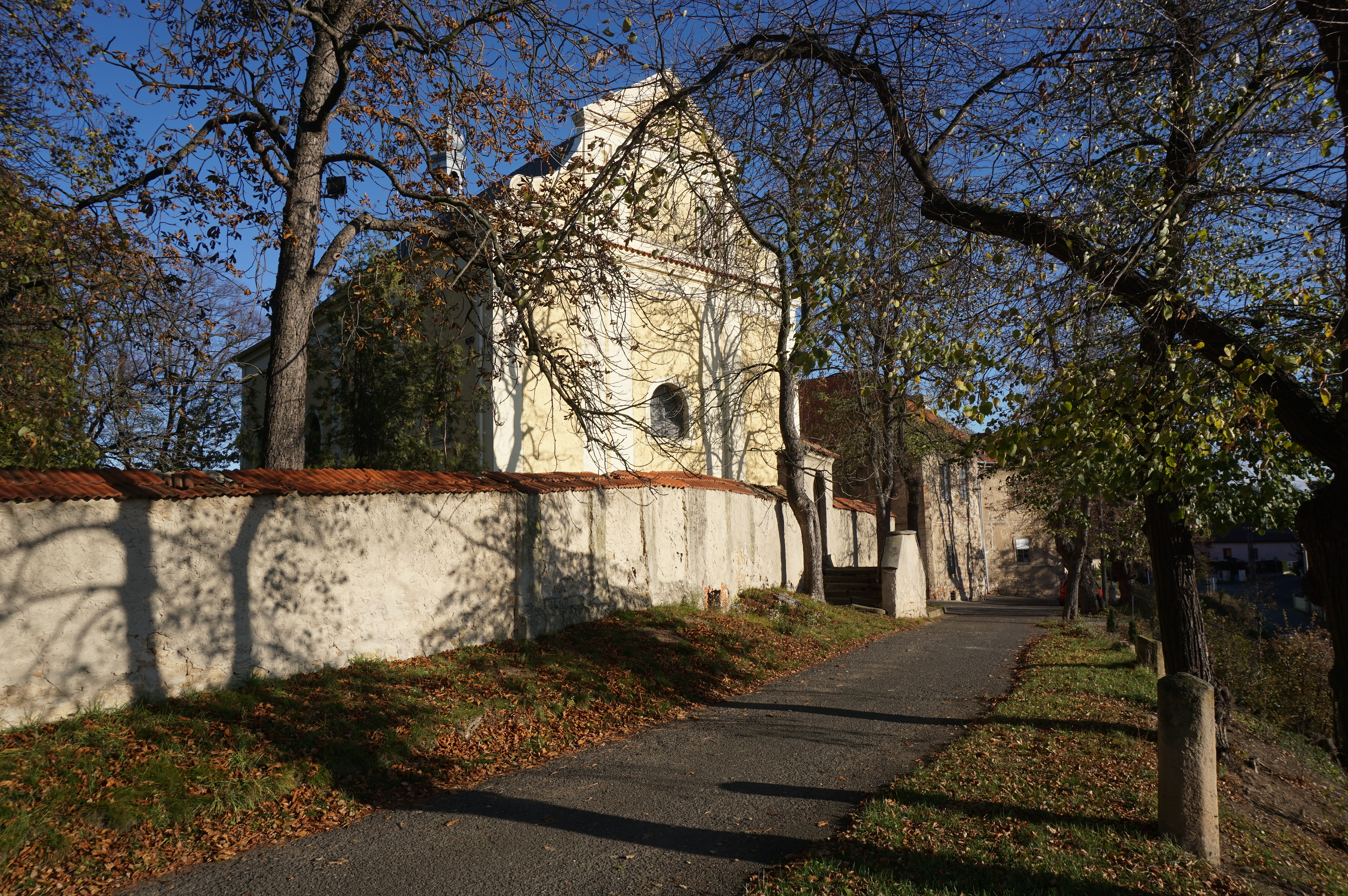
Church of the Nativity of Saint John the Baptist

Among the main landmarks of Tuklaty is the Church of the Nativity of Saint John the Baptist. It was built in the early Baroque style in the 17th century.

A remnant of a fortress, which was probably built in the 14th century, is a tower from the beginning of the 15th century. In the 18th century, it was converted into a bell tower.
