= Joseph Stepling =

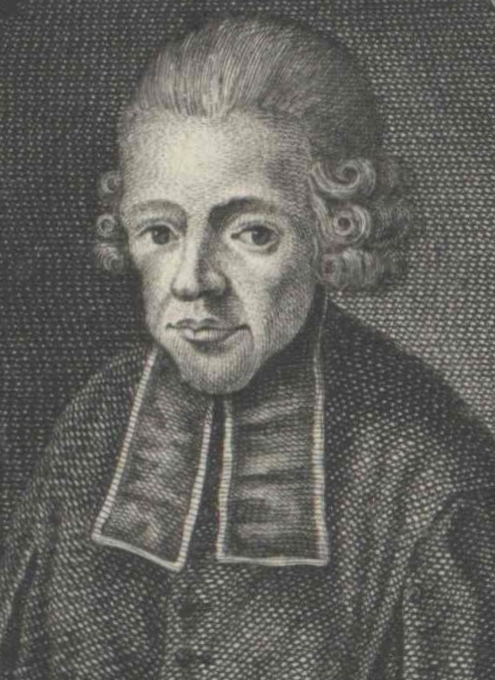
Joseph Stepling in 1776 (line engraving by Johann Balzer)

Joseph Stepling (29 June 1716 – 11 July 1778) was a Bohemian Jesuit priest, astronomer, physicist, and mathematician. Stepling founded the Clementinum Observatory in Prague in 1751 fitted with the best instruments available in that period, some made by Jan Klein. The earliest instrumental meteorological observations in central Europe were made at this observatory. The minor planet 6540 Stepling is named in his honour.

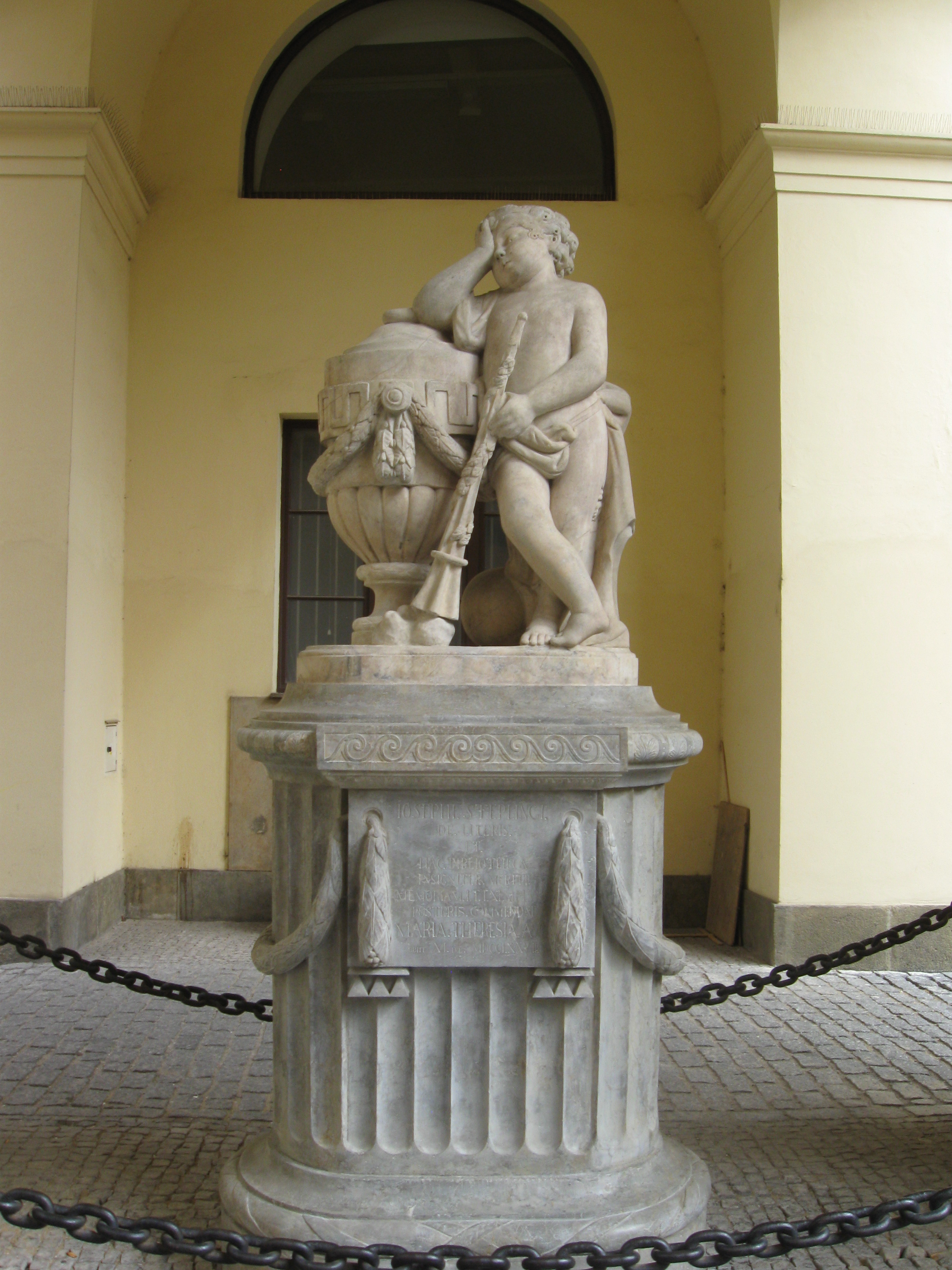
Memorial to Stepling at Prague

Stepling was born in Regensburg and after the death of his father who came from Westphalia and worked at the Imperial Embassy at Ratisbon, his mother moved to her home in Prague. He attended the local Jesuit school and joined the order in 1733. He took an interest in mathematics and astronomy from the teachings of Father Sykora and took a special interest during the lunar eclipse of March 28, 1733 which he had been able to predict. He was influenced into further studies by the mathematician Ignatz Mühlwenzel. He taught at the Gymnasiums of Klodzko and Swidnica from 1738 to 1741. Empress Maria Theresa appointed him faculty at Prague. In 1753 he taught mathematics and physics at the Charles-Ferdinand University, following the ideas of Isaac Newton, Christian Wolff, and Euler rather than Aristotle. He founded a study group along the lines of the Royal Society of London and conducted monthly meetings presiding over them until his death and influencing numerous young scientists including Johann Wendlingen, Jakob Heinisch, Antonin Strnad, Johannes von Herberstein, Kaspar Sagner, Stephan Schmidt, Johann Körber, and Joseph Bergmann.

Some of the oldest series of temperatures used in climate change studies come from the Clementinum observatory.
