= Eva Švankmajerová =

Czech artist and writer (1940–2005)

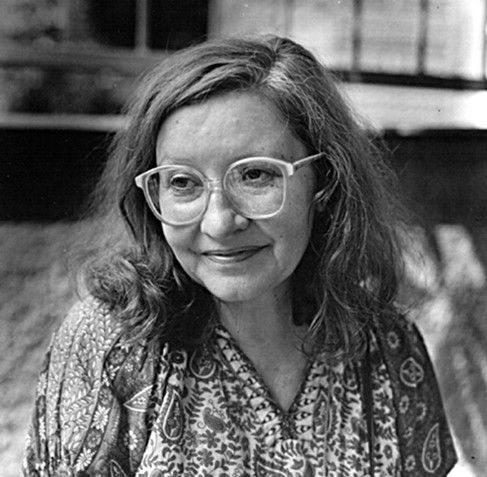
- Born: 25 September 1940; Kostelec nad Černými lesy, Protectorate of Bohemia and Moravia
- Died: 20 October 2005 (aged 65); Prague, Czech Republic
- Education: Department of Alternative Theatre and Puppetry, Academy of Performing Arts in Prague
- Occupations: painter, illustrator, ceramist, poet, writer, animator, costume and stage designer
- Movement: surrealism
- Spouse: Jan Švankmajer
- Awards: Five Czech Lion Awards (1995, 2001, 2001, 2006, 2006)

Eva Švankmajerová (née Dvořáková; 25 September 1940 – 20 October 2005) was a Czech surrealist painter, ceramist, costume and stage designer, poet and prose writer. She was wife and partner of the artist and film director Jan Švankmajer. Her works are reflections of concrete events and their conscious and unconscious, imaginary or dream reinterpretations.

== Life ==
=== Early years and studies ===
She was born as the middle of three siblings in a bourgeois family in Kostelec nad Černými lesy. Her father ran a drugstore there and later founded the chemical factory Cyklamen. In 1942, at the age of two, her parents sent her to her grandmother in Osek to compensate for the loss of her son. The grandmother suffered from cyclical depression. She no longer expected anything positive from life, and she passed these feelings on to little Eva. Her negative impact on her granddaughter's early childhood was the source of Eva experiencing everything in life in a kind of premonition of calamity and with an inability to live without a specific culprit. Nevertheless, Eva was happier with her grandmother than with her parents, remembered her grandmother with affection and later painted her portrait.

Eva Švankmajerová's literary work was influenced by reading old editions of the women's magazines Pražanka and List paní a dívek, which she found at her grandmother's house. The decadent literary vocabulary and affected syntax of these magazines, the charm of stupid life advice and wisdom, and the melodramatically kitschy outpourings became the source of the imaginative humour of her own texts, in which she spontaneously blends mannerred diction with language that is deliberately plebeian or late-normalization communist.

After war, she returned to Kostelec to live with her parents, but throughout her adolescence she felt a strong rivalry with her brothers. The need to get her parents' attention was probably also related to her temporary (perhaps hysterical) deafness. Her psychological state triggered neurotic somatic-type manifestations, such as lameness. A strong inner conflict between the consciousness of female predestination and the need for artistic self-fulfilment at 16 led to a demonstrative suicide attempt by coal gas.

From her early youth she drew and in 1954–1958 she studied carving under Václav Markup and drawing under Vladimír Landa at the Industrial School of Housing. Her classmate was Ivo Medek. In 1958–1962, she studied scenography at the Puppetry Department of the Academy of Performing Arts under Richard Lander. In 1958, she saw Jan Švankmajer's graduation performance The Deer King. Jan immediately attracted her interest, but then had to serve in the army and they met again after two years.

=== 1960s ===
In 1960, as a student, she helped with making masks in the black light cinema during the preparation of Švankmajer's production of Starched Heads. In the autumn of the same year she married him and in 1963 the couple had a daughter Veronika. In 1964, she participated as an actress and designer in the short film The Last Trick (Czech: Poslední trik pana Schwarcewalldea a pana Edgara).

In 1964, she participated together with Jan Švankmajer at May 57 Group exhibition and in 1966 she was represented at the collective Youth Exhibition in Brno (for the International Association of Art Critics Congress). She exhibited individually for the first time in 1967 at Youth Gallery in Mánes. In 1967, Jan and Eva took part in the exhibition Fantasy Aspects of Contemporary Czech Art in Jihlava and Prague and the exhibition Prager Künstler in Linz, and in 1968 in the last exhibition of May 57 Group in Basel (Austellung tschechischer Künstler).

In 1968, the Švankmajer family moved to a Renaissance house in Prague-Hradčany, which they purchased from the Prague Castle Administration. Together they travelled to Paris, where student demonstrations were taking place at the time. Upon their return, the situation at home escalated when the StB began to prosecute the signatories of The Two Thousand Words manifesto, which was also signed by Jan Švankmajer. The whole family took temporary refuge in the apartment of animator Pavel Procházka. After the Warsaw Pact invasion of Czechoslovakia, Eva arranged documents for the whole family and forced them to emigrate to Austria. Jan Švankmajer made a short film there (Picnic with Weissmann) and then decided to return home. Eva wanted to take advantage of an invitation to the United States, but in the end she followed him to Prague with her daughter.

=== Normalisation and persecution ===
In 1969 she had solo exhibition in Písek. Ivo Medek brought the Cuban surrealist Jorge Camacho to the Youth Exhibition at "Krásná jizba", where Eva Švankmajerová's paintings attracted his interest. He visited her in her studio and they exchanged paintings. This meeting became a crucial event for Eva. Jan Švankmajer arranged a screening of his films for Jorge Camacho and on that occasion they both met the surrealist group around Vratislav Effenberger.

During the normalization period, she lost the opportunity to exhibit in official galleries and sporadic exhibitions of her paintings were held in Germany, Lyon or small unofficial galleries in Prague.

In 1970, the Švankmajer couple became members of the Surrealist Group in the Czechoslovakia and Eva has been a kind of informal "leader" ever since. Both participated in all the activities of the Surrealist group and in 1972 they took part in several experiments in the Central military hospital in Prague with euphoric gas and LSD. In 1974, reproductions of her paintings were published in the Parisian surrealist magazine B.L.S. with a text by Vratislav Effenberger on her paintings.

From the mid-1970s, she and Jan Švankmajer set up a ceramic workshop in her father's house in Kostelec nad Černými lesy. They signed their works with the common pseudonym E. J. Kostelec (or J. E. Kostelec). In 1975, the Švankmajer family had a son Václav, who later also became an author of animated films.

In 1976, she met Emila Medková, who at that time renewed her cooperation with the Surrealist Group in the Czechoslovakia, and became a close friend of hers.

In 1979, the Parisian gallery Le Triskéte prepared an exhibition of forty paintings by Eva Švankmajerová under the title Césarienne - Peintures (Caesarean section - Paintings), which was eventually cancelled. Only a lithographic poster and a small catalogue with reproductions and texts translated into French were published, illustrating her direct, sarcastic and cruel view of the female fate and the female body. The Geneva review Le La, led by the surrealist poet Gilles Dunant, offered the Czech surrealists a fake copyright of the Swiss edition for their samizdat collection Open Game in order to circumvent the communist censorship.

In 1981, the Švankmajer couple purchased a 19th-century castle in Horní Staňkov, which they discovered while searching for exteriors for the film The Fall of the House of Usher. They build a ceramic kiln there and gradually converted the completely dilapidated castle, which had previously served as a hostel for seasonal Roma workers, into a surrealist Kunstkamera.

In 1983, a joint exhibition of Czech surrealists was to be held at Sovinec Castle. The day before the opening, two StB officers officially banned it as an "unauthorised event". Only a small samizdat catalogue was published. In 1985, a minor exhibition of Eva Švankmajerová's paintings was held in a small unofficial gallery Juniorklub in Prague. An unknown vandal cut up six canvases, including the painting Menstruation (1977). Under the title Secret Boils, in 1987 she exhibited paintings, drawings, prints, collages, objects and collaborations on Jan Švankmajer's films in Brussels and Tournai, Belgium. The exhibition was partially censored by the communist agency Artcentrum, which did not allow the paintings Emigration and Rebus 2 to be exhibited.

=== 1990s - 2005 ===
With the fall of communism, her general scepticism towards society did not disappear, as one alienation replaced another and subordination to the party cultural line was replaced by dependence on market mechanisms. The possibility of presenting her works freely gave her energy, but did nothing to diminish the personal revolt that had accompanied her since childhood. As a fierce individualist, she never subscribed to feminism, but rejected the established roles of the (subservient) woman in society and often turned her unkind, ironic and even cruel humour on herself.

In 1990, the surrealist magazine Analogon began to be published again, and from the second issue onwards Eva regularly contributed to it. A retrospective exhibition Analogon 1969-1990 was held in Paris, where Eva was represented by her paintings. In 1991, Jan and Eva Švankmajer had a joint exhibition Contamination of the Senses in Annecy on the occasion of the International Festival of Animated Films.

In 1994, she teamed up as a production designer on the feature film The Lesson of Faust and received the Czech Lion Award for "Best Art Achievement of the Year" together with Jan Švankmajer. In the 1990s she exhibited in Cardiff, Welshpool, Hanover, Gütersloh, Sitges, Telluride in the United States.

In 1996, a major exhibition of works by Eva Švankmajerová and Jan Švankmajer entitled Touch, Arcimboldo, Vanitas was held in several European cities (London, Warsaw, Kraków). The French filmmakers Michel Leclerc and Bertrand Schmitt began to prepare the concept and script for the feature-length documentary Les Chiméres des Švankmajer, which premiered in 2000. A further exhibition of 61 works by the couple was held in London in 1997, and in the same year Eva was represented in exhibitions at the National Gallery in Prague and the Prague City Gallery. In 1998, major exhibitions of both spouses were held in several regional centres and the monograph Anima Animus Animace - EvaŠvankmajerJan, between film and free creation was published.

For Little Otik, Eva and Jan Švankmajer received the Czech Lion Award in 2001 for the best art design and for the film poster. In 2001 she exhibited alone or with Jan Švankmajer in Prague (catalogue of the Vltavín publishing house), in Vienna, La Rochelle, Rotterdam, 2002 in Annecy, Charleville-Mézières, Paris, 2003 in Paris, Parma, 2004 in Brussels. In June 2004, a major retrospective exhibition of Jan and Eva Švankmajerová entitled Food opened at the Prague Castle Riding Hall, and in autumn 2005 they both had an exhibition in Japan.

In 1996 Eva Švankmajerová was diagnosed with breast cancer and faced repeated complicated treatments. She coped with the disease through her work, which often had a very personal theme (ES: All in Time, pastel, 1997). She finally succumbed to her illness on 20 October 2005.

In 2006, she was awarded another Czech Lion (for Best Artwork and Poster) in memoriam, together with her daughter Veronika, for Lunacy. In the same year, the Václav Špála Gallery opened the exhibition Eva Švankmajerová: A Diary 1963-2005 and the publishing house Arbor vitae published her monograph.

== Work ==
Eva Švankmajerová is known for her surrealist paintings, books and films at home and abroad. She has teamed up on films as a production designer with her husband Jan Švankmajer, as well as other directors (among others Evald Schorm, Jaromil Jireš, Juraj Herz) and Jiří Brdečka ("There is one miller on the river").

Eva Švankmajerová's literary and artistic works are characterised by imaginative humour, which draws on a variety of sources - from first-pubescent women's magazines, to absurd transcriptions of contemporary Stalinist phraseology, to the dehumanised traffic of modern civilisation. A natural part of Eva Švankmajer's work is her repeated ironic reflections on the theme of "women's destiny" and sarcastic comments on the often empty and formalised relationships between women and men. It is not primarily a feminist topic for her. She sees the focus of the issue in the most intimate experiences of erotic partnership and her own family life. The dialectic of love is latently present and sometimes explicitly manifested in her literary (The Cave of Baradla, 1995) and artistic works (Homage to the Marquise de Sade, majolica, 1995). Jan Švankmajer, in his confession to Eva, wrote: I have a weakness for your paintings, for that painted diary of our life, which is as open as sesame and at the same time as refined as Chinese cuisine.

Vratislav Effenberger places her work within his theoretical concept of surrealist negation of negation. He finds the dominant personality of Eva Švankmajerová in her hateful attitude towards consumer society, personified by the pink female piggy, as dull as striving. The intensity of this negation is directly proportional to the desire for the miraculous, which this consumerism defrauds. The romantic need to defend a kind of elemental purity leads Eva Švankmajerová to a dialectical purification that is capable of disgusting the revulsion almost considered the norm.

In her Chronicle of Work and Rest, Švankmajerová concretizes this theme, which is both personal and timeless (the defense of the dignity of nature), and identifies directly what she hates - fat female tractor drivers in scarves, scenes from factory halls, weavers, tin flasks, hoes. She is not only showing unreflected anger or programmatic scepticism, but her anger should also be perceived as self-defence in the existential sense, in her case also self-defence against her own insecurities, anxieties and aggressions (Existential Moment, 1978).

This outpouring of anger is clearly and directly recorded in her text Portrait. (Note: "It is disgusting to walk with a naked face. What about my face. Indifferent and raw. But all those cowardly servile faces that abound everywhere. In the station cafeteria. At the tram station, in the shop. Everywhere. On visits, shopping, trips. All those cowardly, thieving, fucking faces, all those quarrelsome fluffy fringes, all those greedy hungry claws, all those illicit louts, and all those honest assholes in jeans clothing.")

=== Paintings, drawings, prints ===
Švankmajerová studied wood carving and scenography and did not start painting consistently until around 1963. Her artistic style gradually evolved from an almost neocubist figuration (Woman I, Woman II, 1963) to a stylized pseudo-naivism influenced by Henri Rousseau (Monkey Alki, 1966), and in the 1970s to neo-expressionism, formally close to the German Junge Wilde movement. She was inspired by naive and folklore art, fairy tale illustrations, but also by puzzles, riddles and puns.

Her artistic feeling, however, is ideologically rooted in surrealism and develops freely, without any formal limitations. She is above all a painter and poet of relationships, tensions, roles, ritual and pseudo-ritual behaviour and communication between people (Who reads this is an ox, 1973). As a portrait painter, she views and illustrates life and the world through her own most personal and intimate destiny, and often paints fanciful, humorous and self-ironic self-portraits. The erotic curiosity itself turns into a poetic obsession, into adventure novels, into a passion for all kinds of extremes and mysteries on Eva Švankmajerová's canvases.

Eva Švankmajerová received her artistic education primarily in the field of applied arts and drew inspiration from village fair and naive art, which led her to simplified depictions of figures, objects and environments. She herself states that her deliberate naiveté was a statement against the expressive material abstraction of the early 1960s.

From the mid-1960s onwards, her pictorial series Rebuses was created, in which she uses puns, folk sayings, proverbs and quotations, and sarcastically reverses the meaning of political and patriotic slogans.

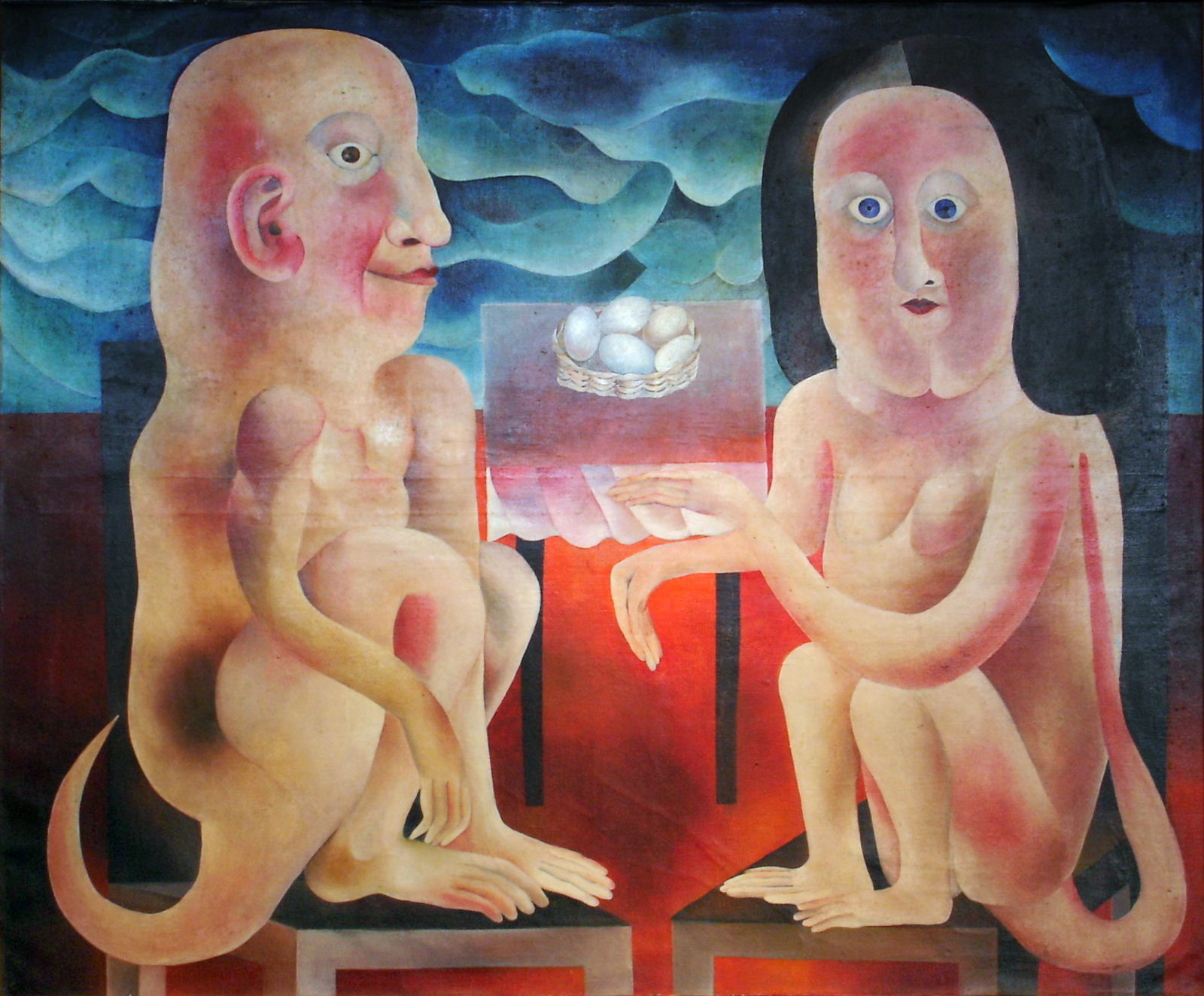
Monkey Alki, 1966, oil, 110x131 cm

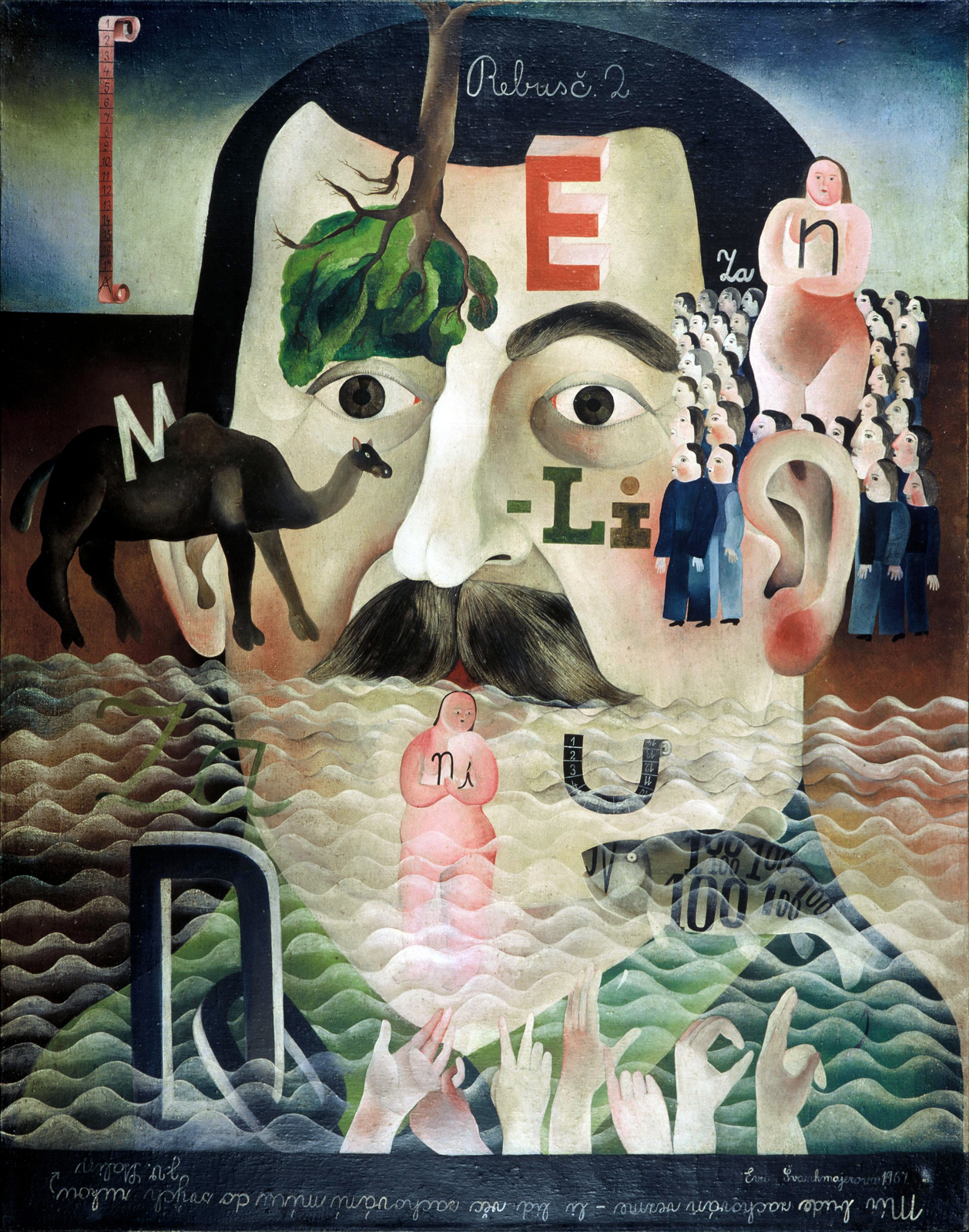
Rebus No. 2. Peace will be preserved if the people take the preservation of peace into their own hands - J.V. Stalin, 1967, oil, 126x99 cm

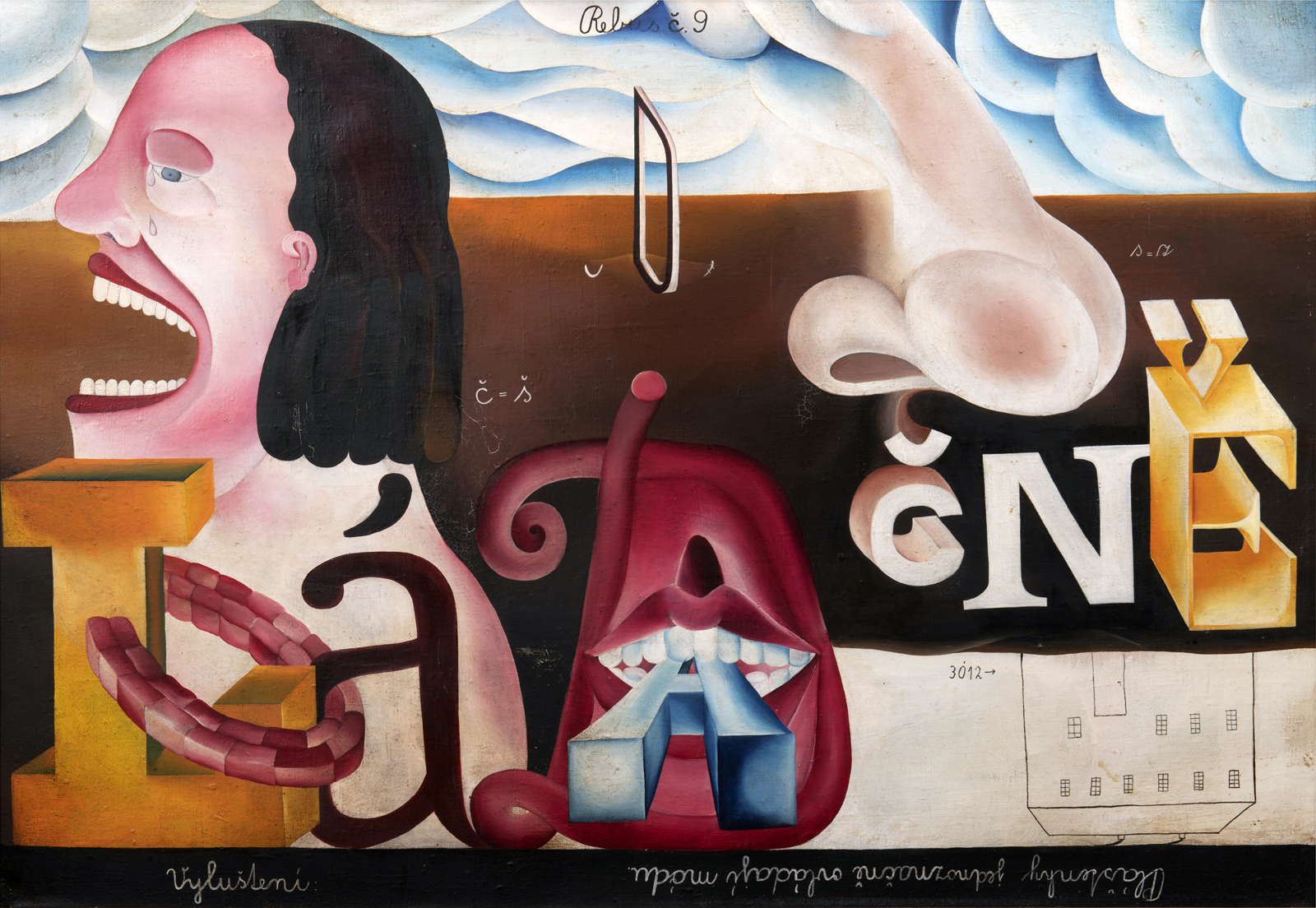
Rebus No. 9 (Raincoats clearly dominate fashion), 1968, oil, 66x95 cm

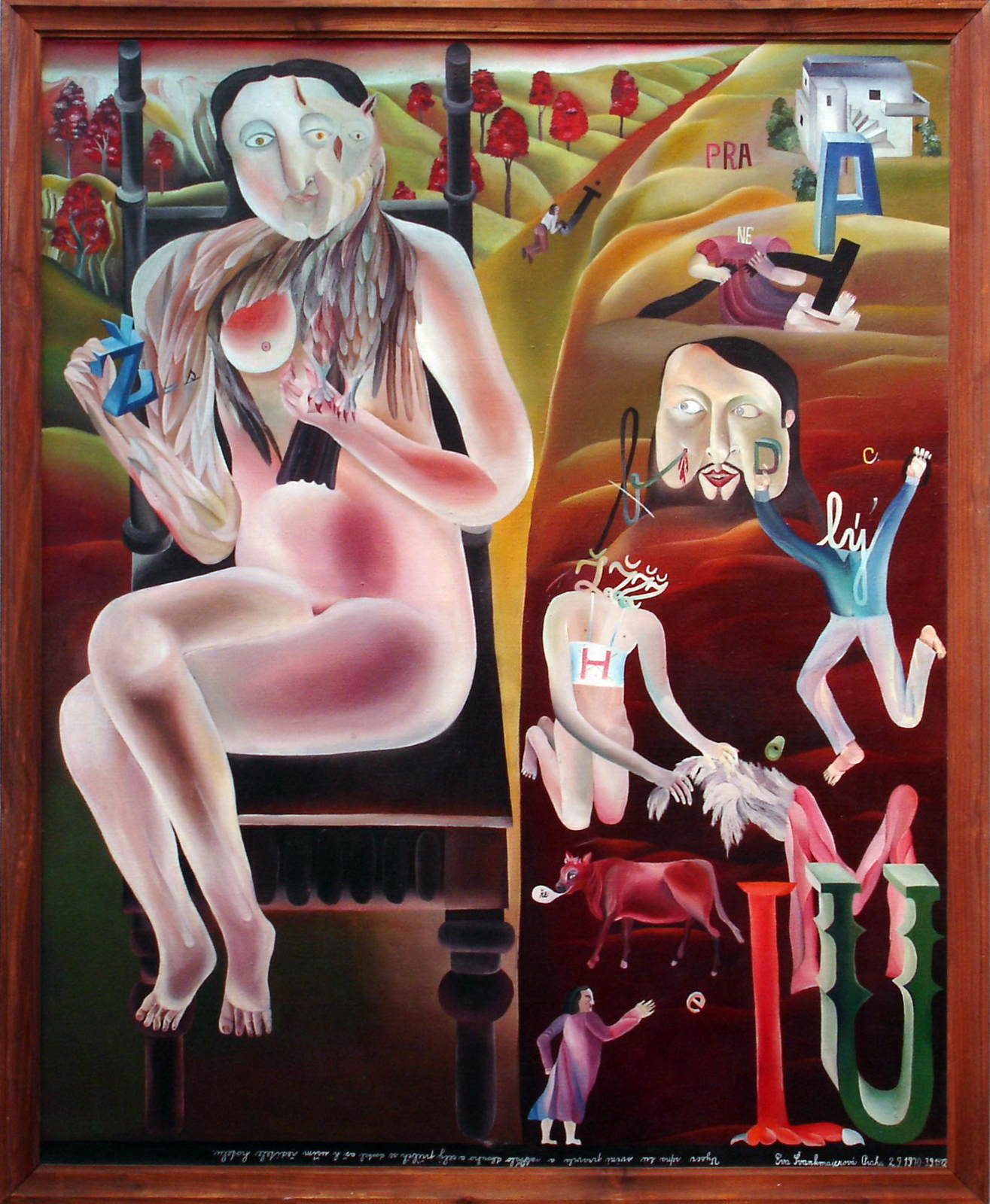
Fuck That Bitch, and it wasn't long before the whole story reached the ears of the hotel manager, 1970–1972, oil, 130x105 cm

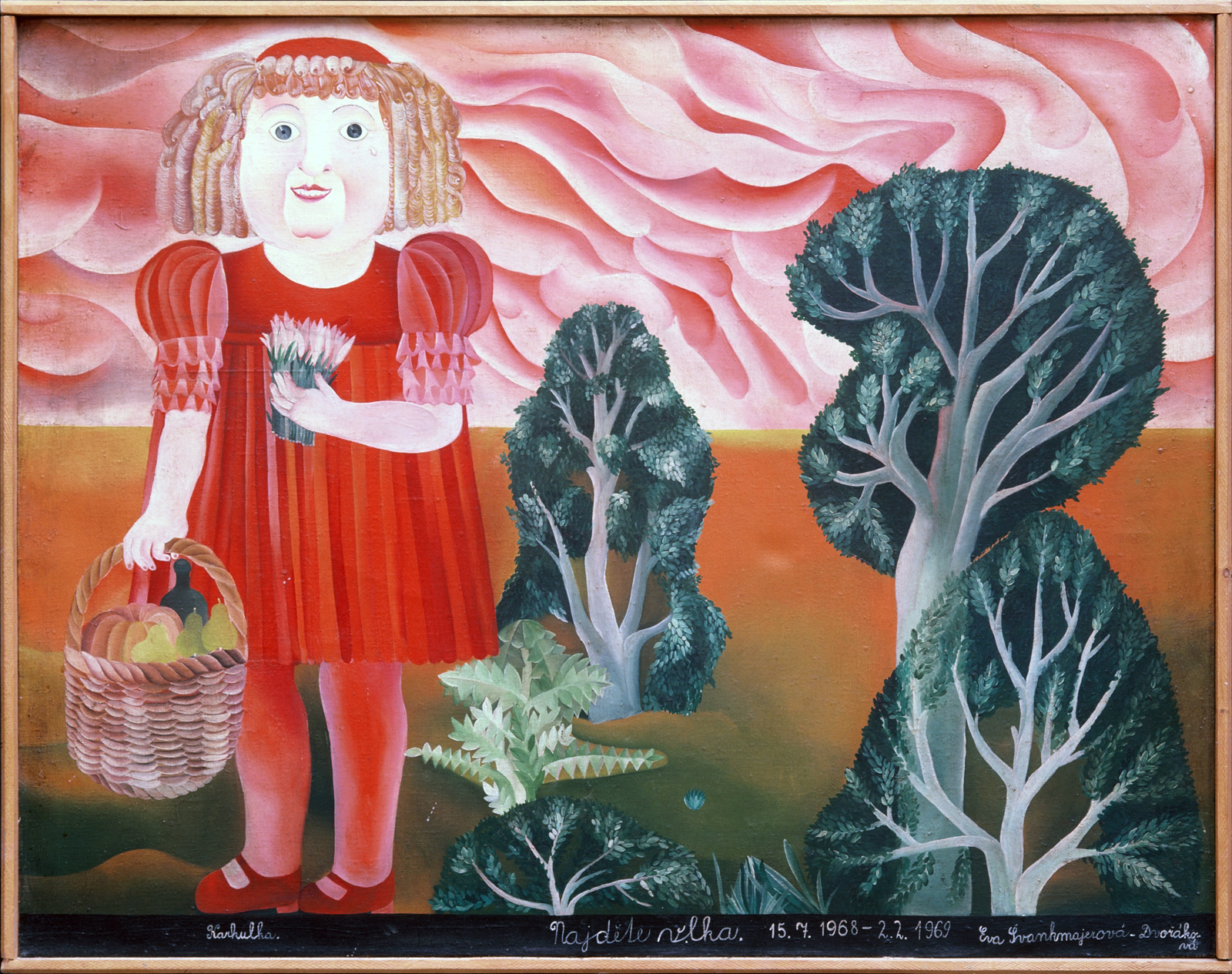
Little Red Riding Hood. Find the Wolf, 1968–1969, oil

She first drew attention to herself in the late 1960s with her Emancipation Cycle - variations on famous paintings by Botticelli, Manet and Rubens, in which she replaced female figures with male ones (Sleeping Venus, 1967, Birth of Venus, 1968, Breakfast in the Grass, 1968, The Kidnapping of the Sons of Leukipp, 1969), which expressed her personal defiance of the female artist's satiety in a male world, or by light-hearted paraphrases of other painters' styles (Early Picasso's Visit to van Gogh at Arles, 1970). Gradually, she creates a curious contrast between her seemingly naive artistic language and her subjects, in which she treats her own physicality, childbirth, motherhood, home, cooking, bed, landscape, solitude, emigration and falling out of a window with feminine sensitivity and surrealist humour (Bed, 1976, Emigration, 1981). From the second half of the 1970s onwards, she abandoned simple narrativity and characterisation and grouped her figures into unprecedented and surprising units. The expressive colours, raw openness and new style of painting regardless of the compositional rules give the paintings a captivating dynamism. In 1979–1980, she painted a series of pictures with figures in motion metamorphosing into various components of the pictorial scenery (Panic, Refugees) and began work on the series Secret Boils.

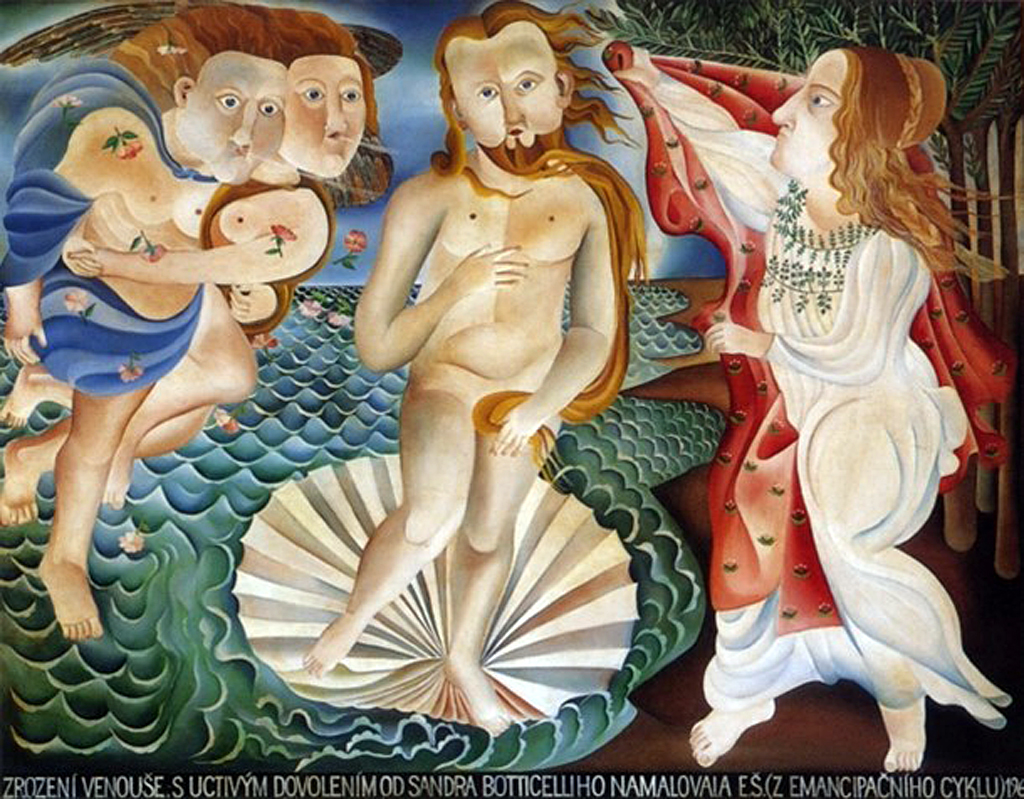
The Birth of Venouš, courtesy of Sandro Botticelli, 1968, oil, 120x150 cm

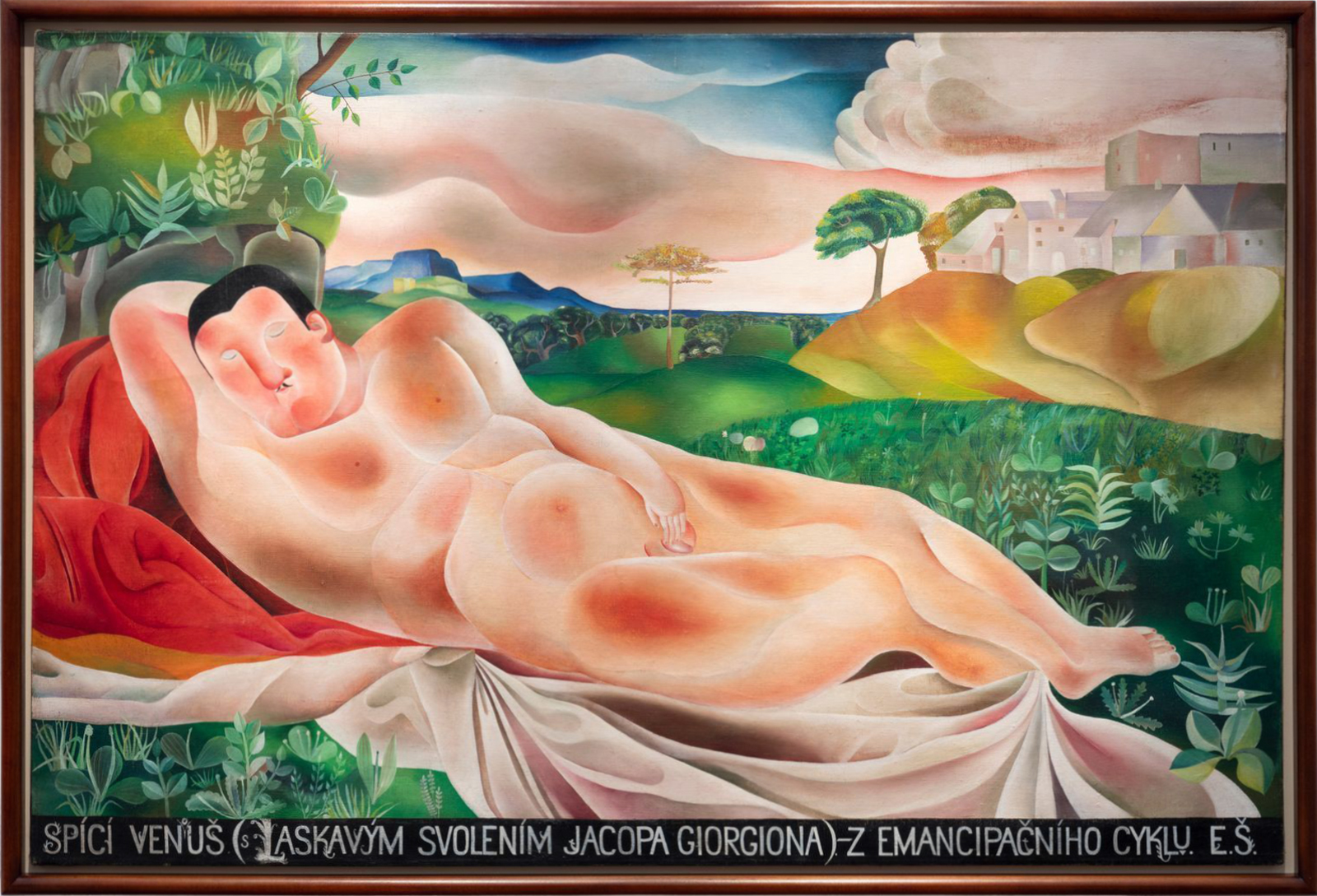
Sleeping Venouš (courtesy of Jacopo Giorgione), 1969, oil, 84x125 cm

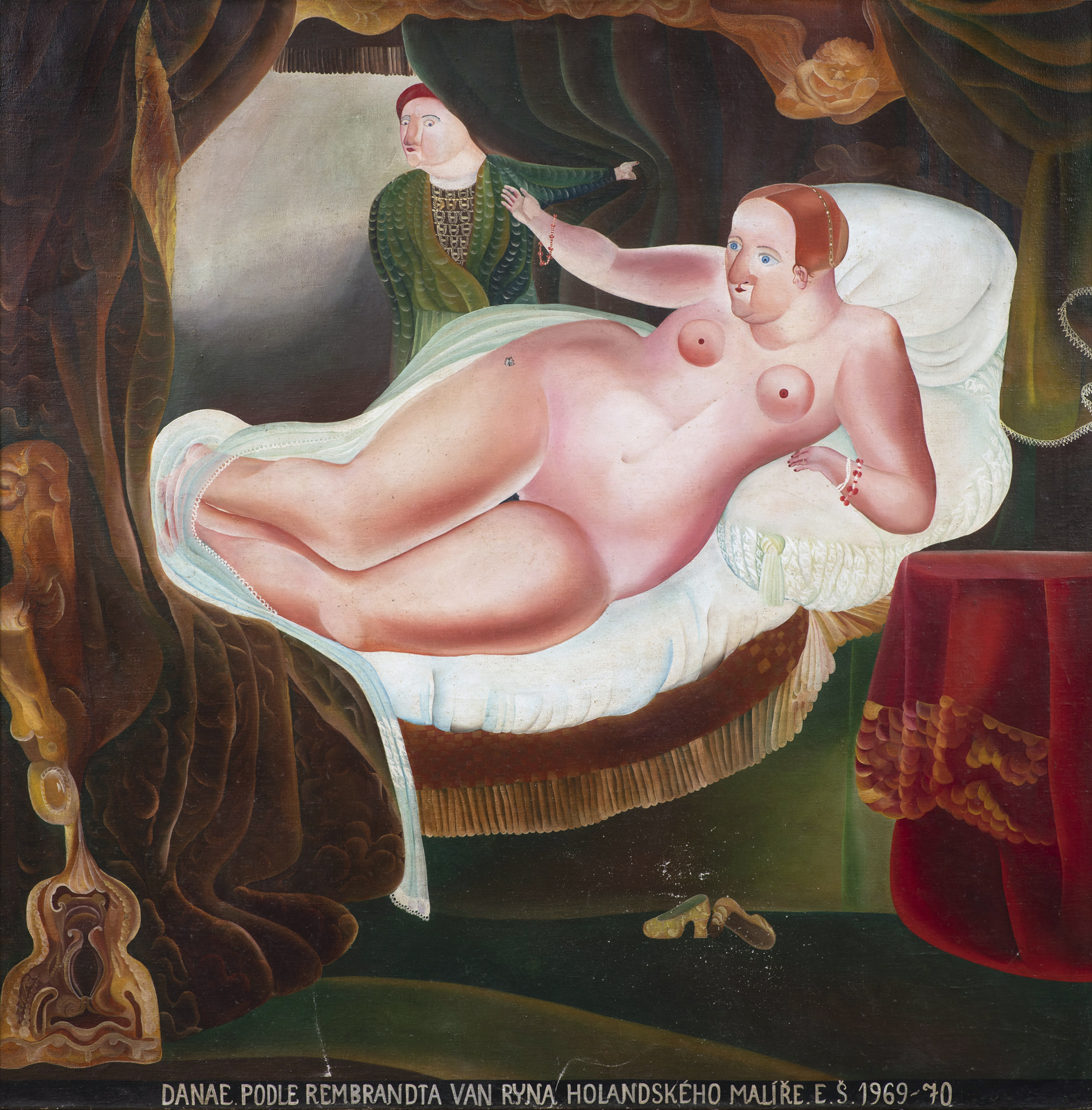
Danae after Rembrandt van Rijn, Dutch painter, 1969–1970, oil, 150x150cm

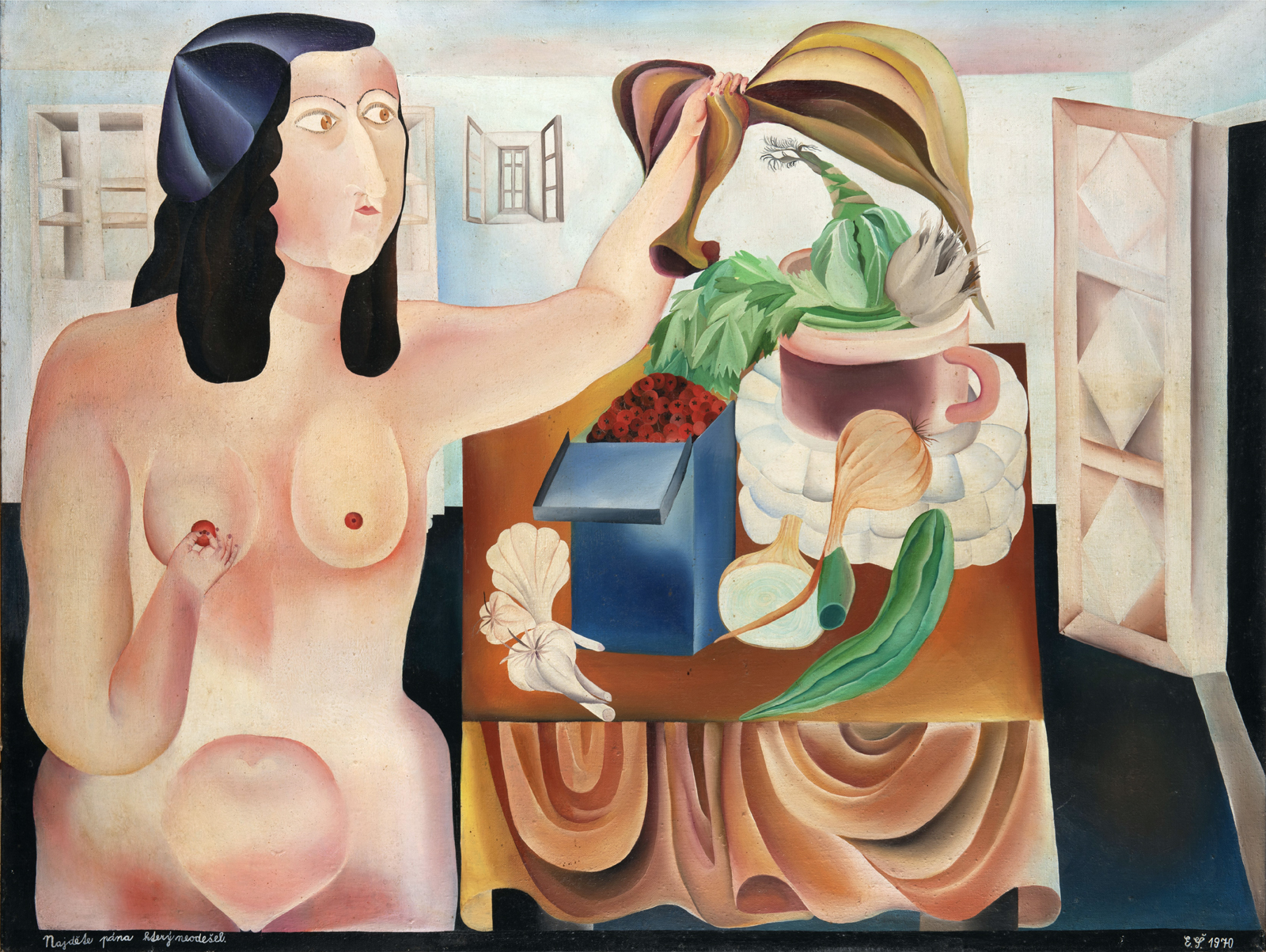
Find the Man Who Did Not Leave, 1970, oil, 75x100 cm

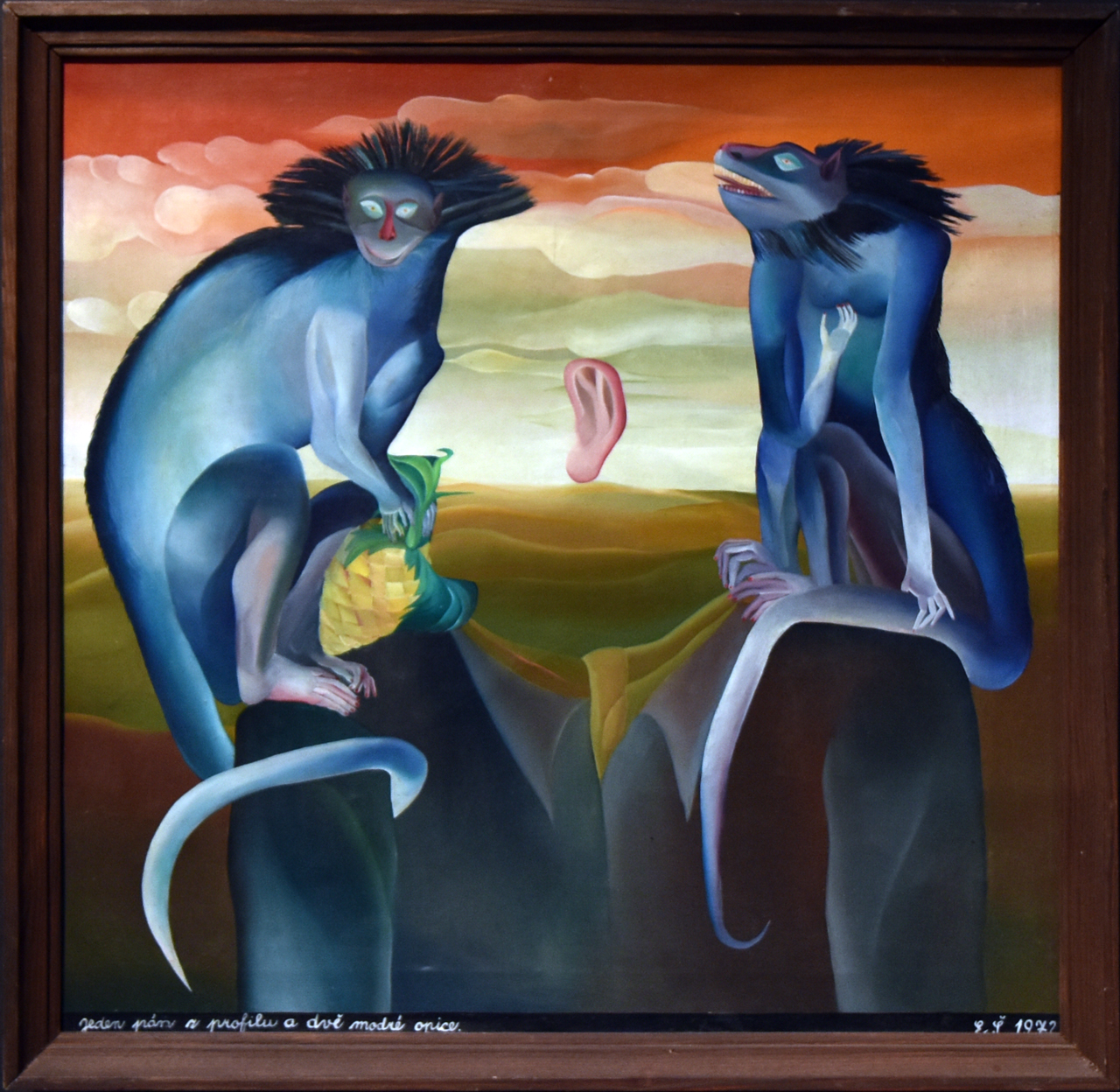
One Man in Profile and Two Blue Monkeys (1972)

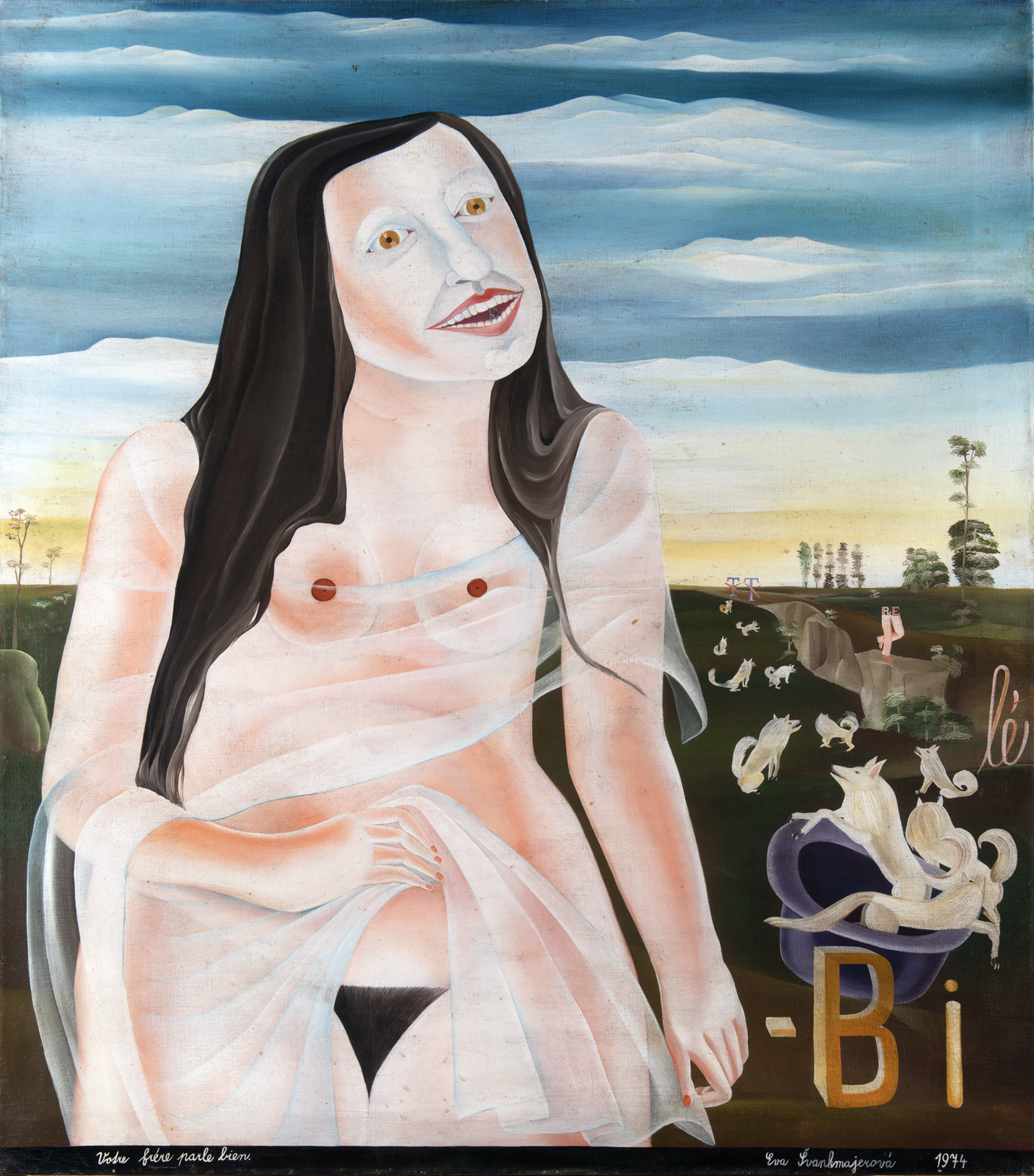
Votre frere parle bien, 1974, oil 85x75 cm

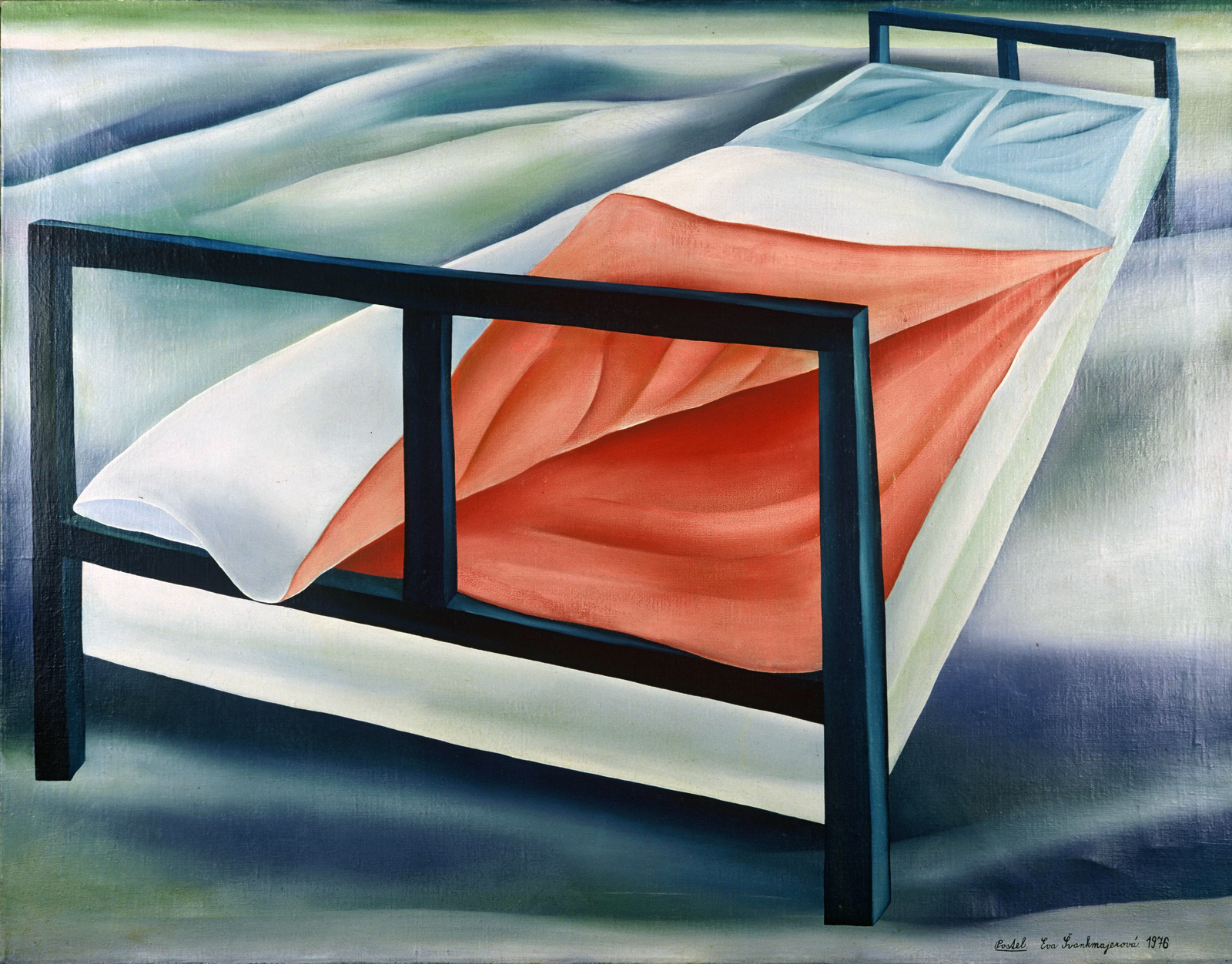
Bed, 1976, oil 90x117 cm

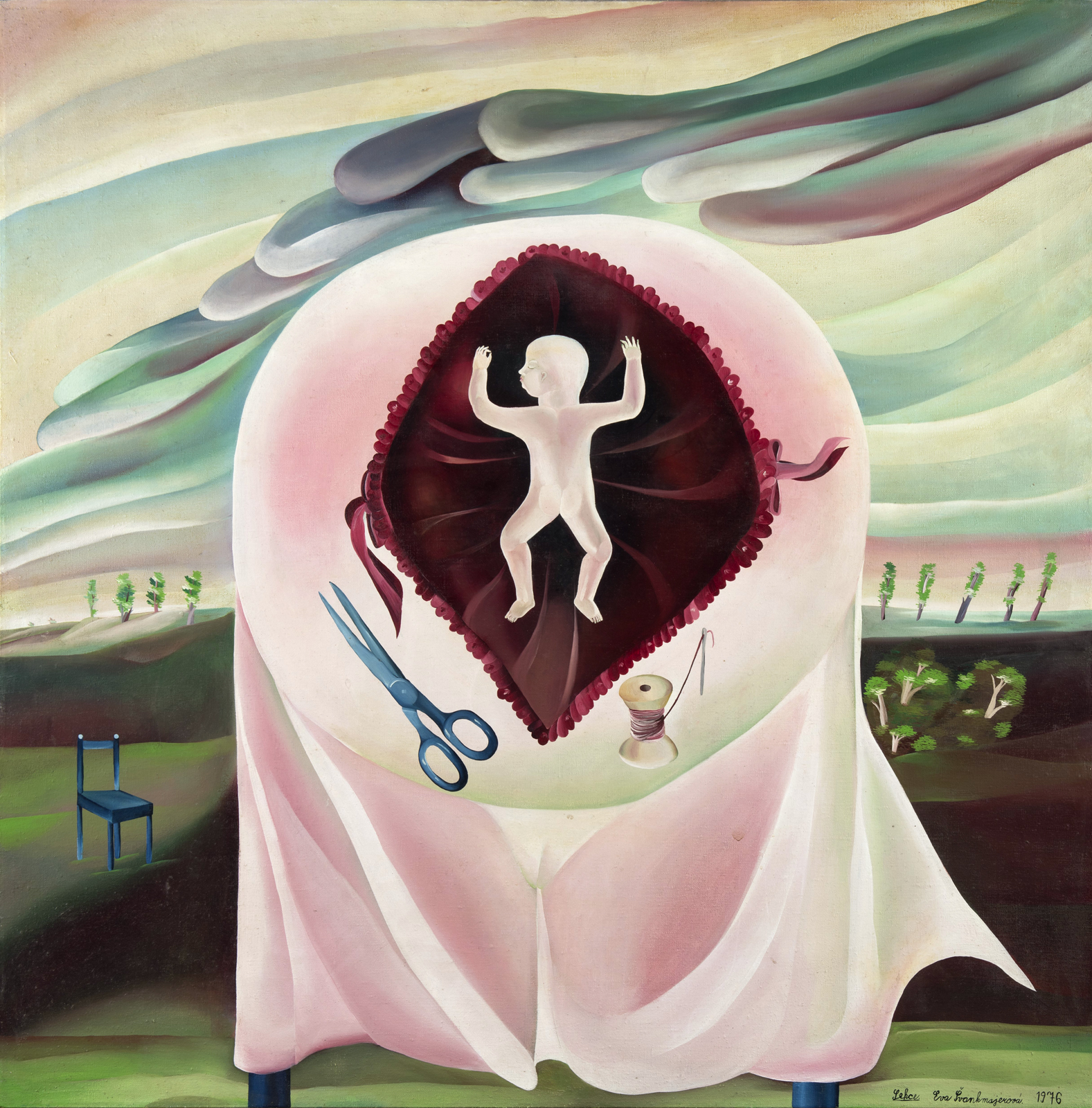
Section (Caesarean), 1976, oil, 100x100cm

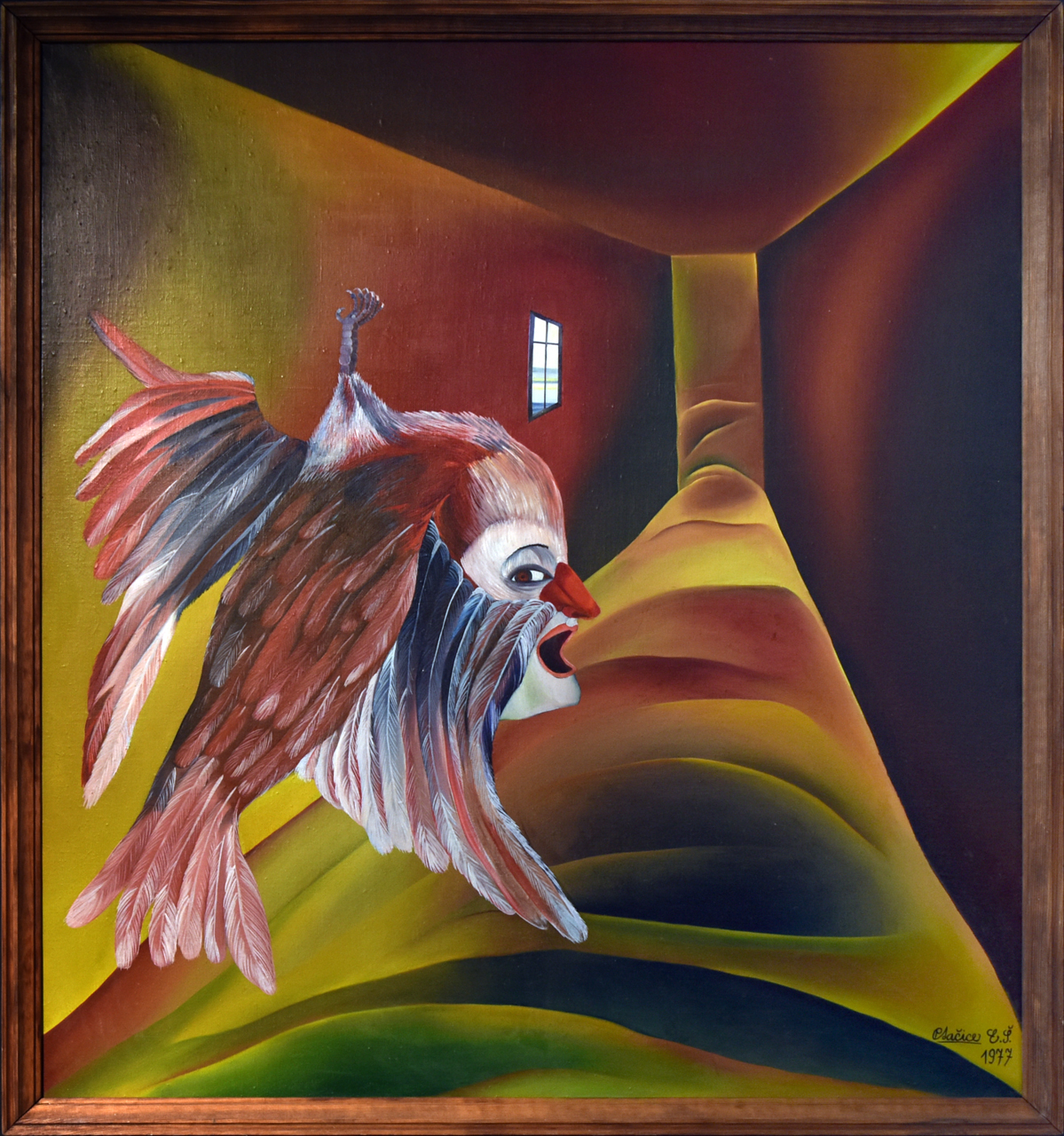
The Birdwoman (1977)

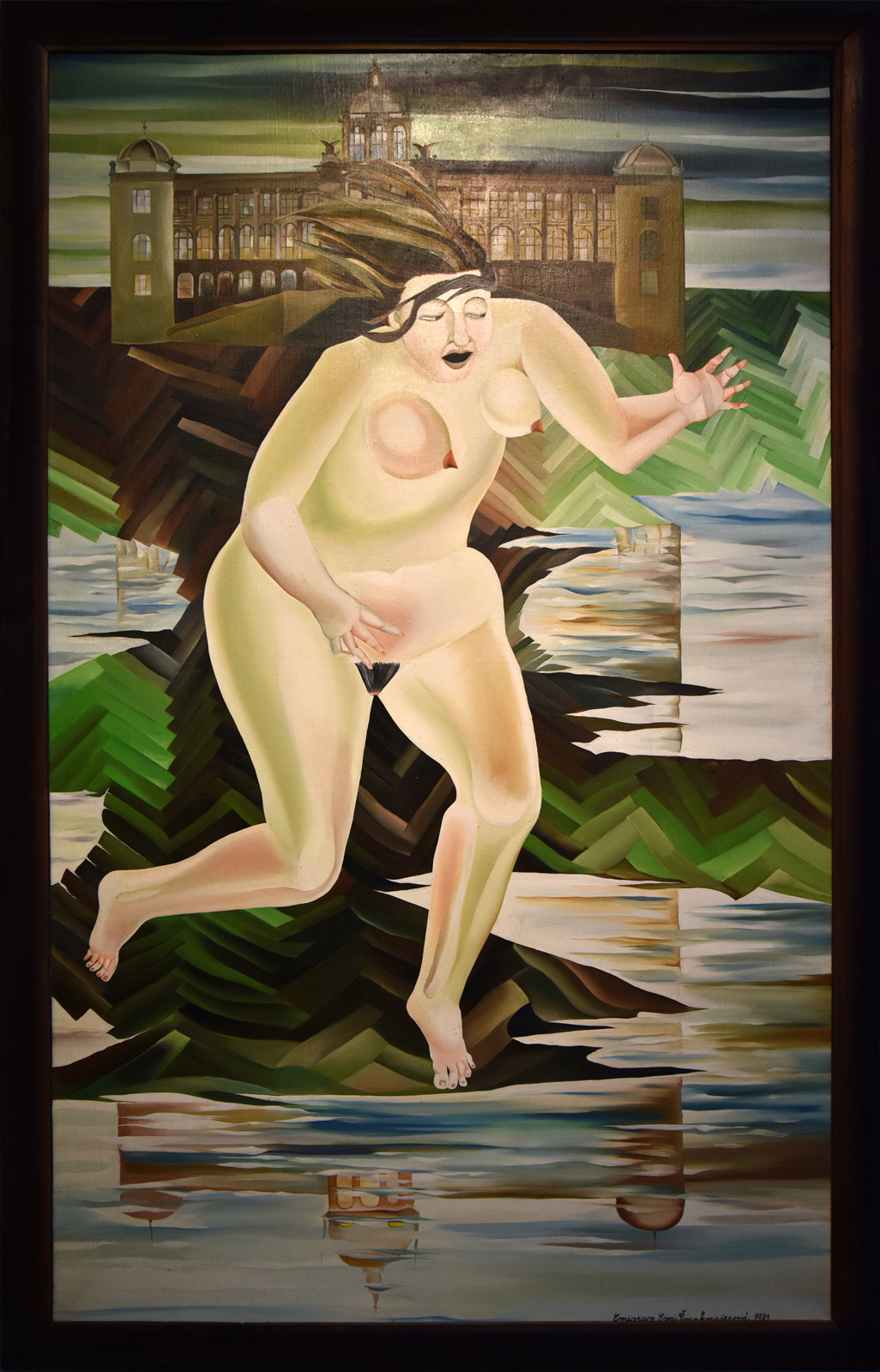
Emigration (1981)

In Švankmajerova's work, the ambiguous situation of female bodies in the domestic environment manifests itself in a gradual merging with the surrounding forms. The same is true in the relationship of the body to everyday objects and furniture. At other times, on the contrary, the object takes on human attributes and absorbs and reflects the mental tension of the living figures.

Impressive are her portraits of Vratislav Effenberger (The Hunt for the Black Shark, 1980, Gulliver in hand puppet theatre, 1985–1986), while the self-portraits usually come across as deliberate caricatures (Me in Action, 1991). Several reproductions of her works were published in 1985 in the Swedish surrealist magazine Dunganon, where one issue was dedicated to Czechoslovak surrealists. In a study of her paintings for the catalogue of the 1991 exhibition in Annecy, Ivo Purš wrote: "Eva Švankmajerová takes a critical view of the "aseptic cage of post-industrial society", her conception of the female body and eroticism is cruel, dark and caustic. The imaginative practices of the painter - poignancy, cynicism, black humour, sarcasm - are not gestures of hopelessness. The intensity of negation is directly proportional to the miraculous desire."

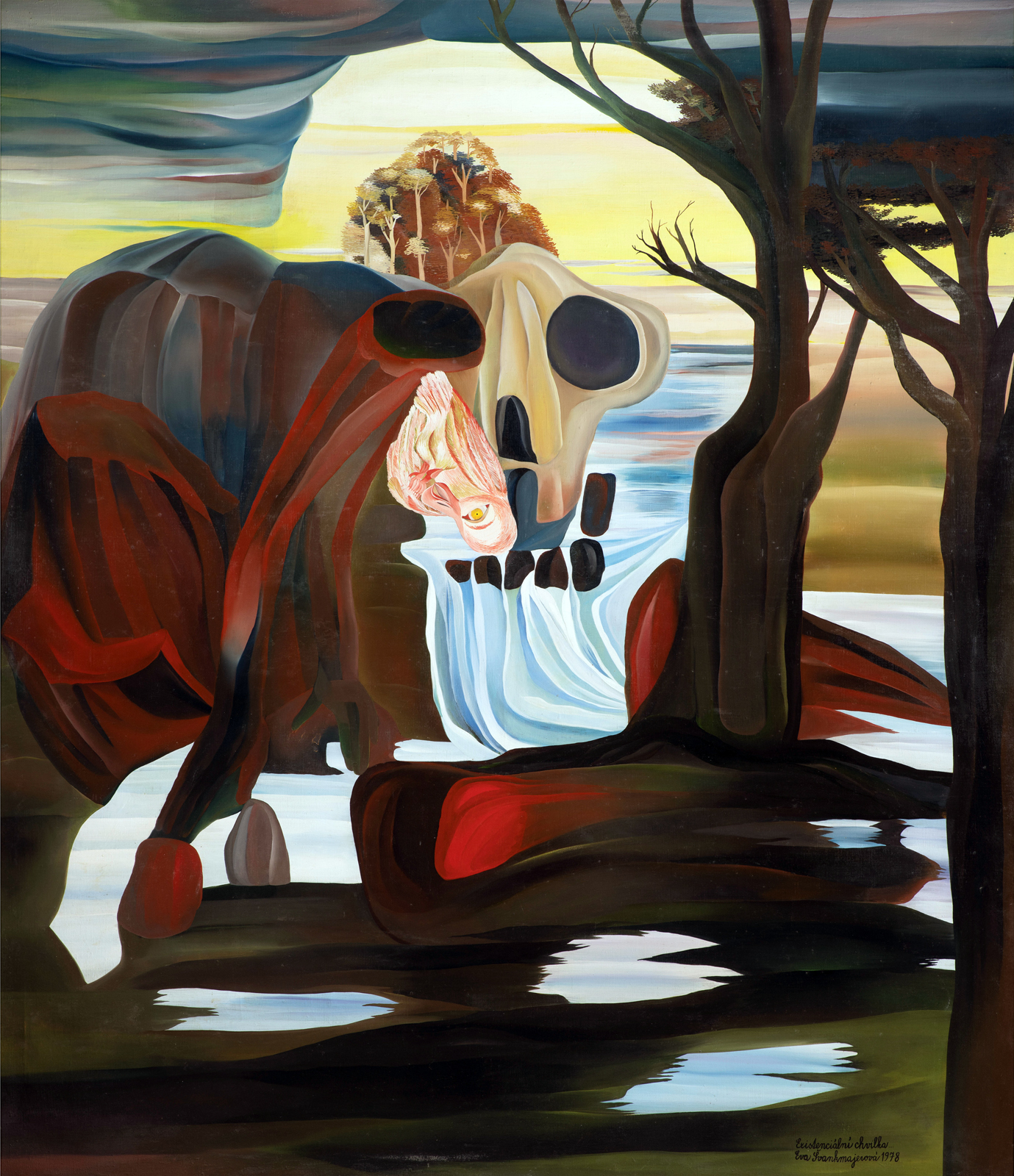
An existential moment, 1978, oil, 130x150cm

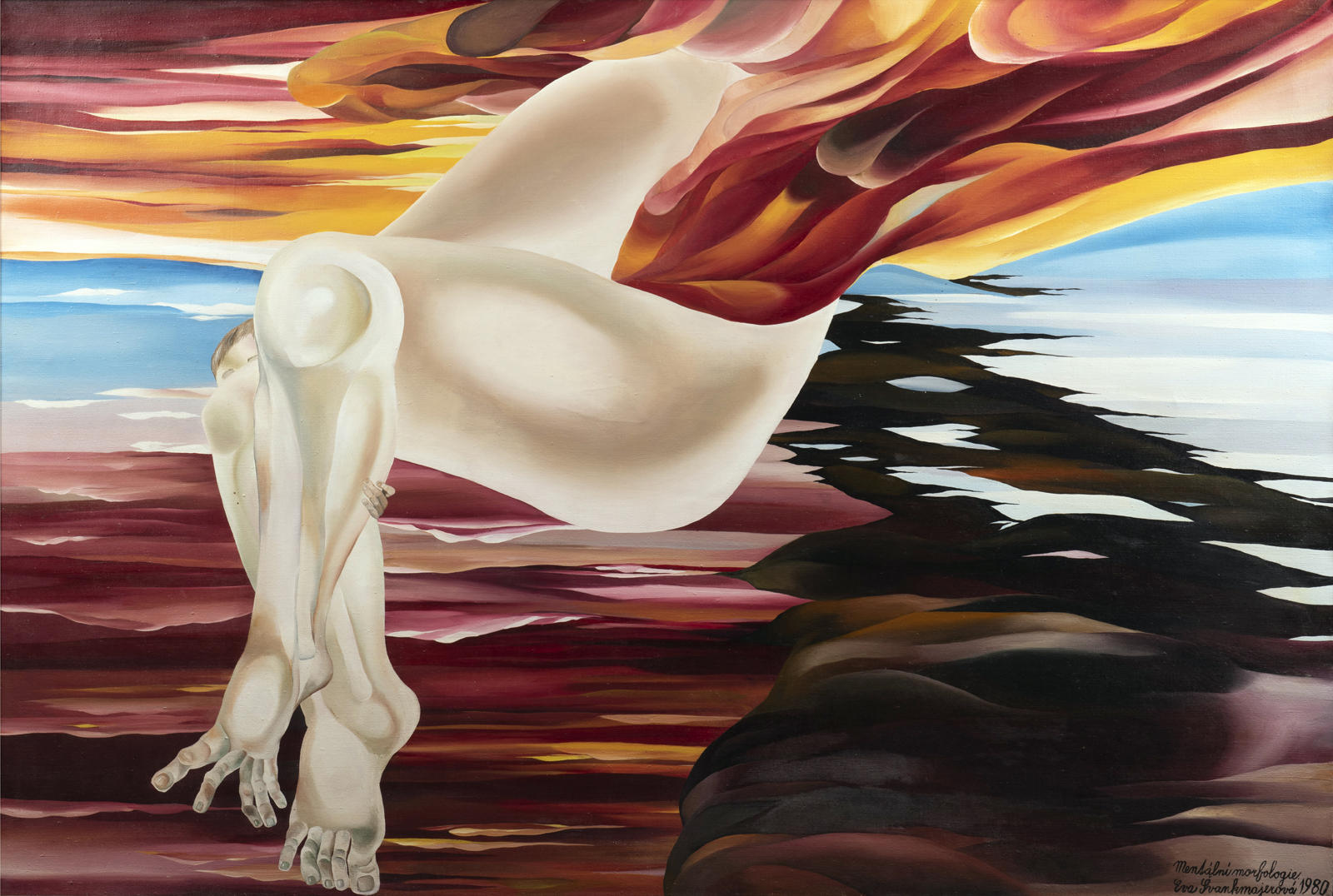
Mental Morphology, 1980, oil, 135x90cm

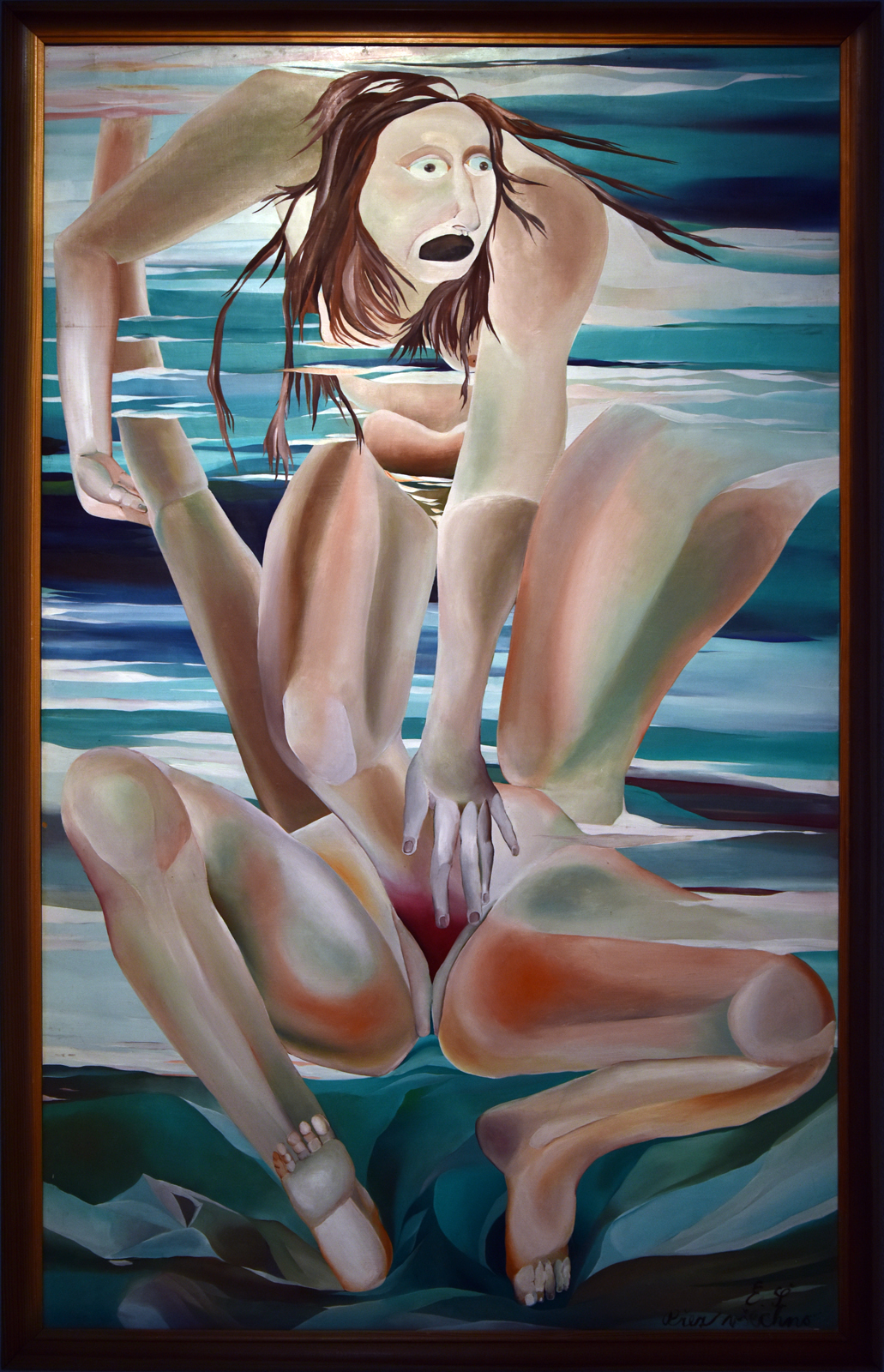
Eva Švankmajerová, Despite Everything

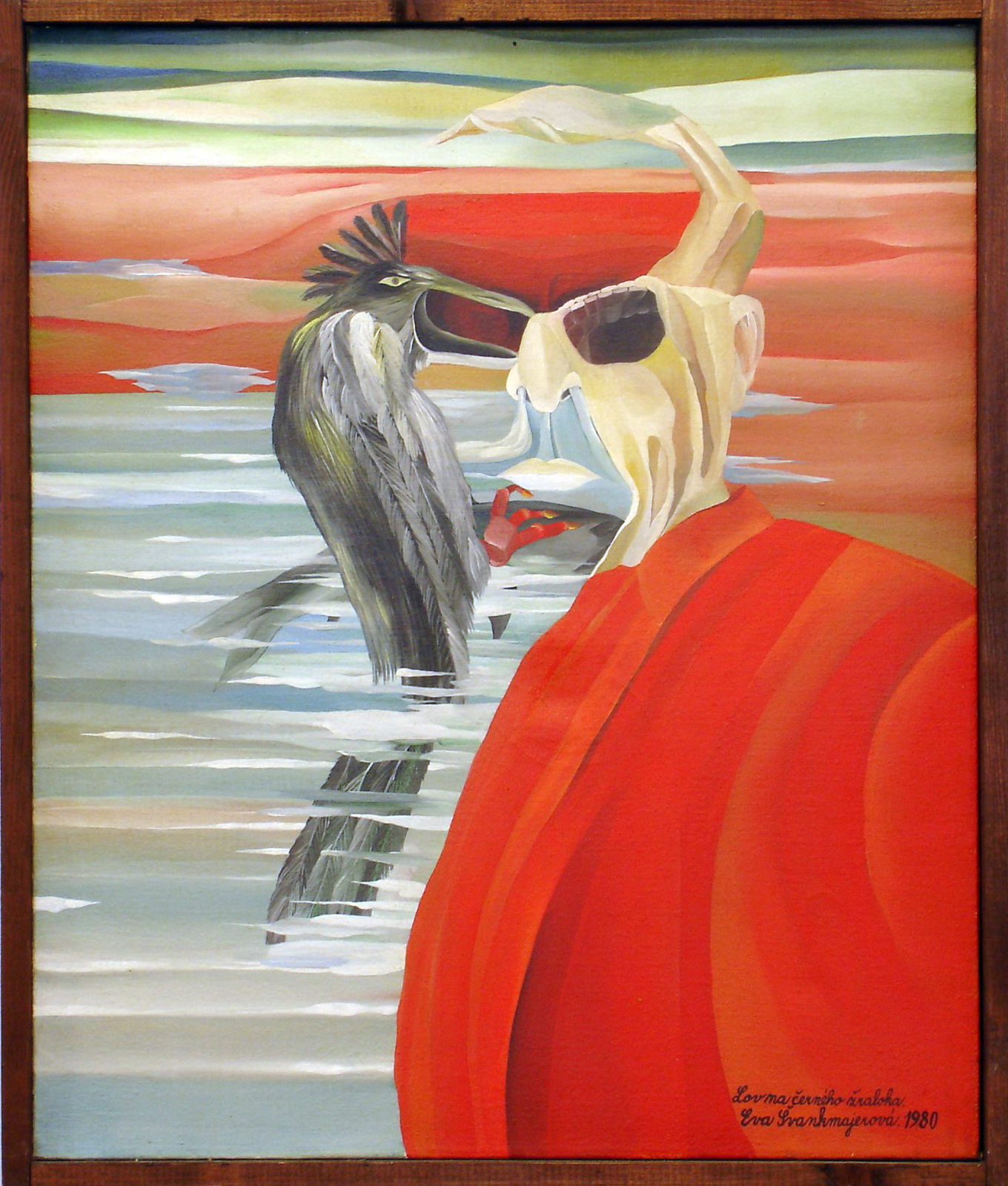
Hunting the Black Shark (Portrait of Vratislav Effenberger), 1980, oil

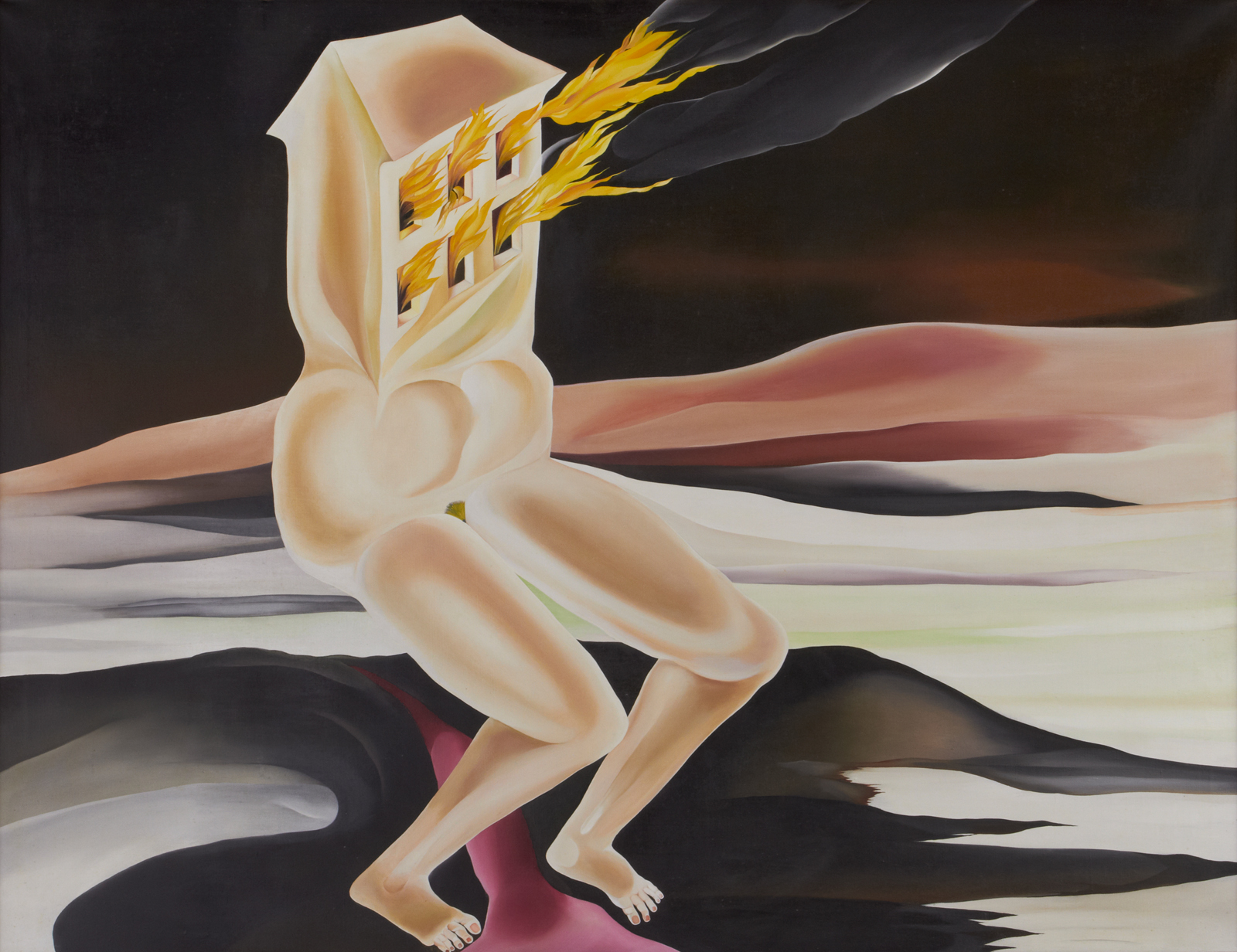
The Tenth House, 1980, oil, 151x116cm

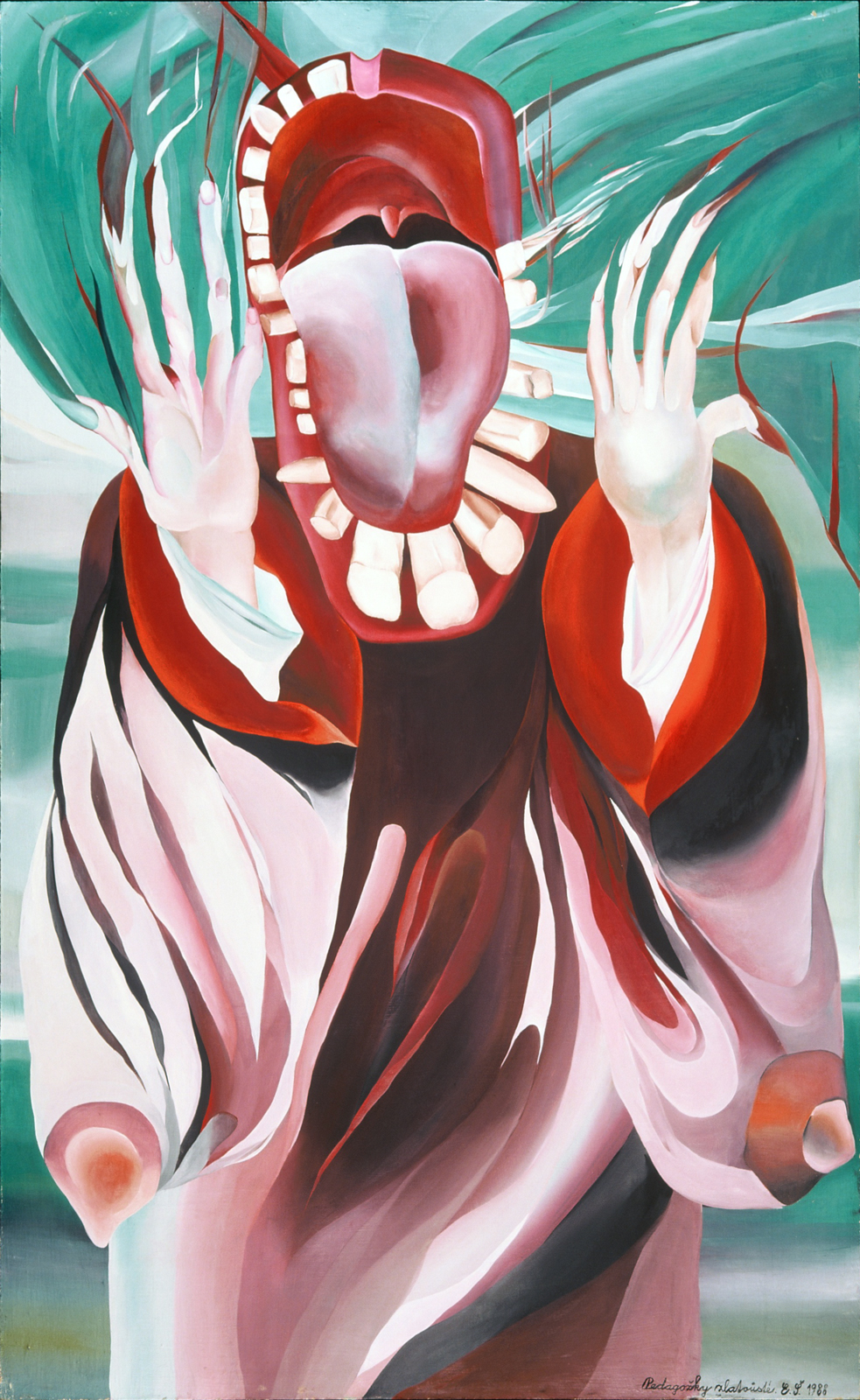
Golden-Tongued Teachers, 1988, oil

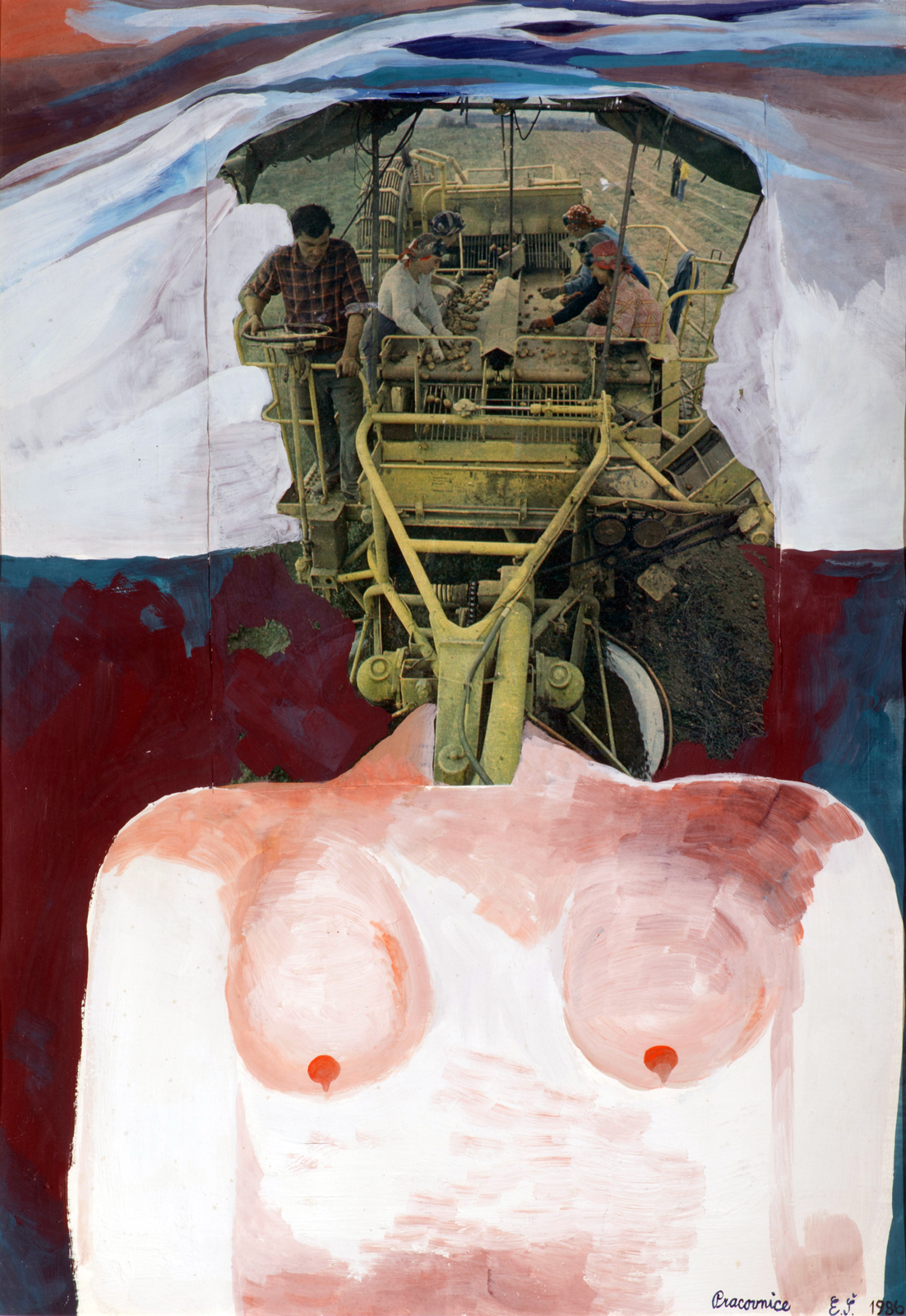
Female Worker II, 1986, tempera, collage on hardboard, 63x44 cm

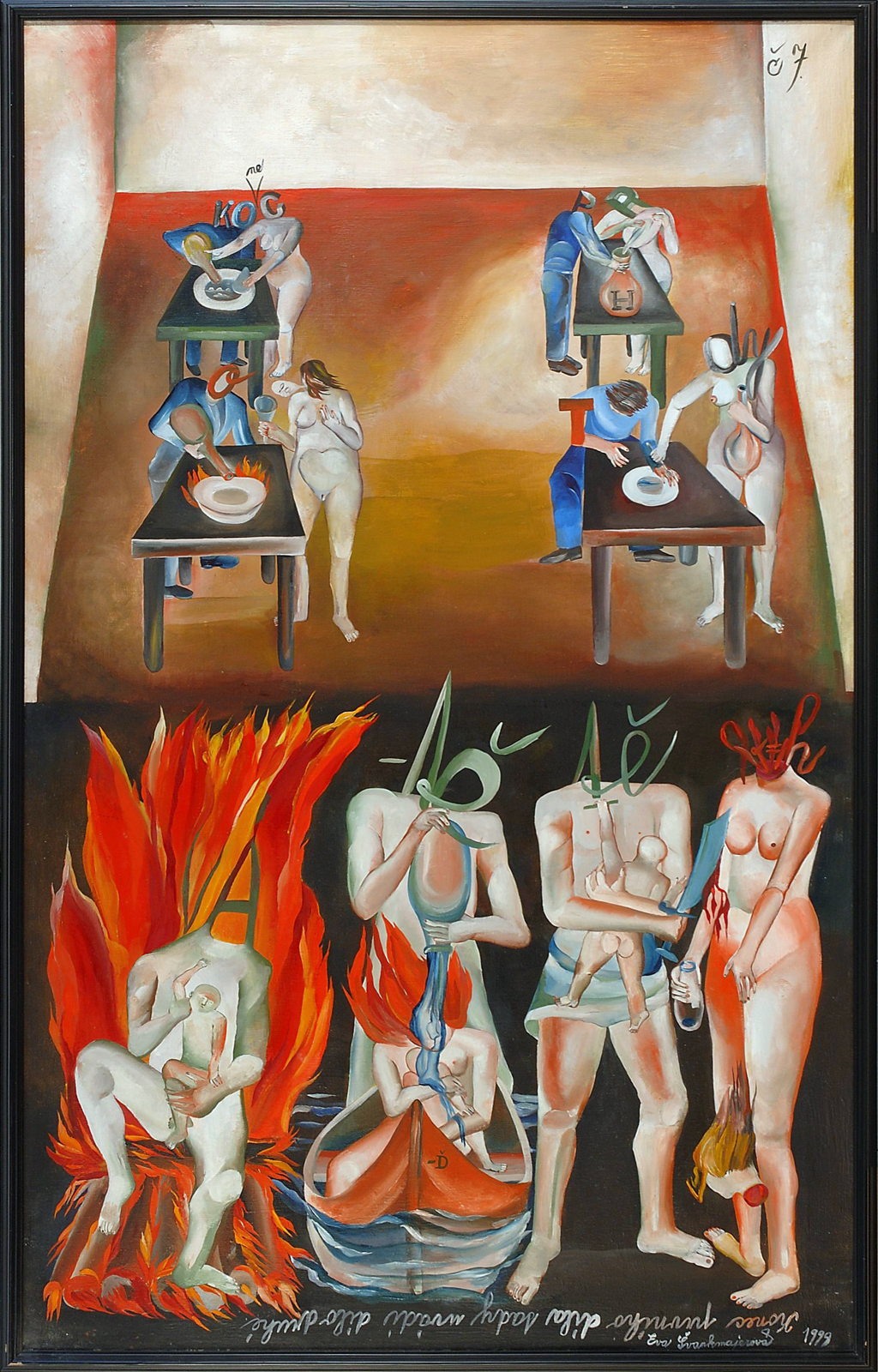
Mutus liber (fig. 7) The end of the first work introduces the second, 1999, oil, 120x75cm

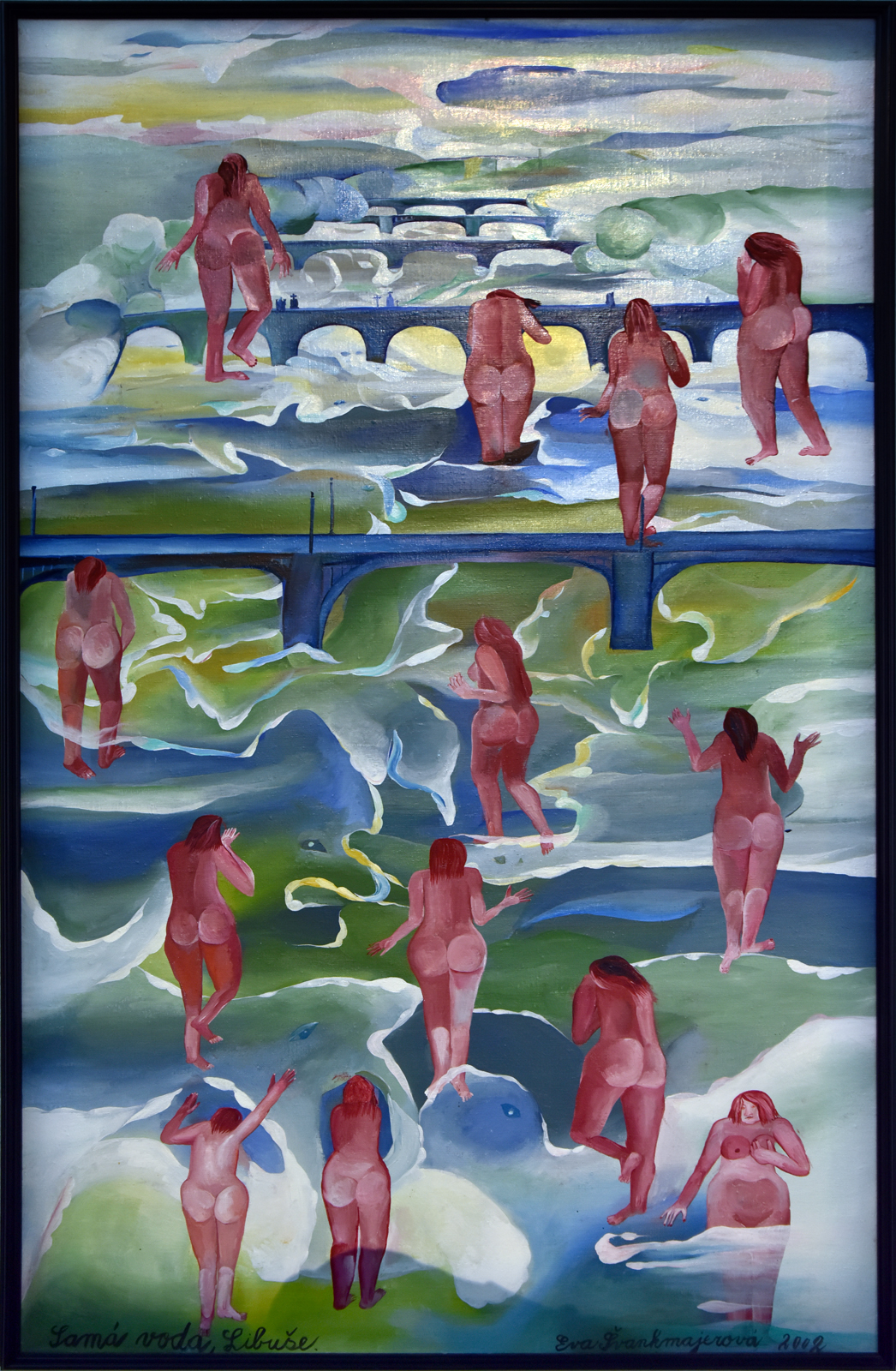
All Water, Libuše (2002)

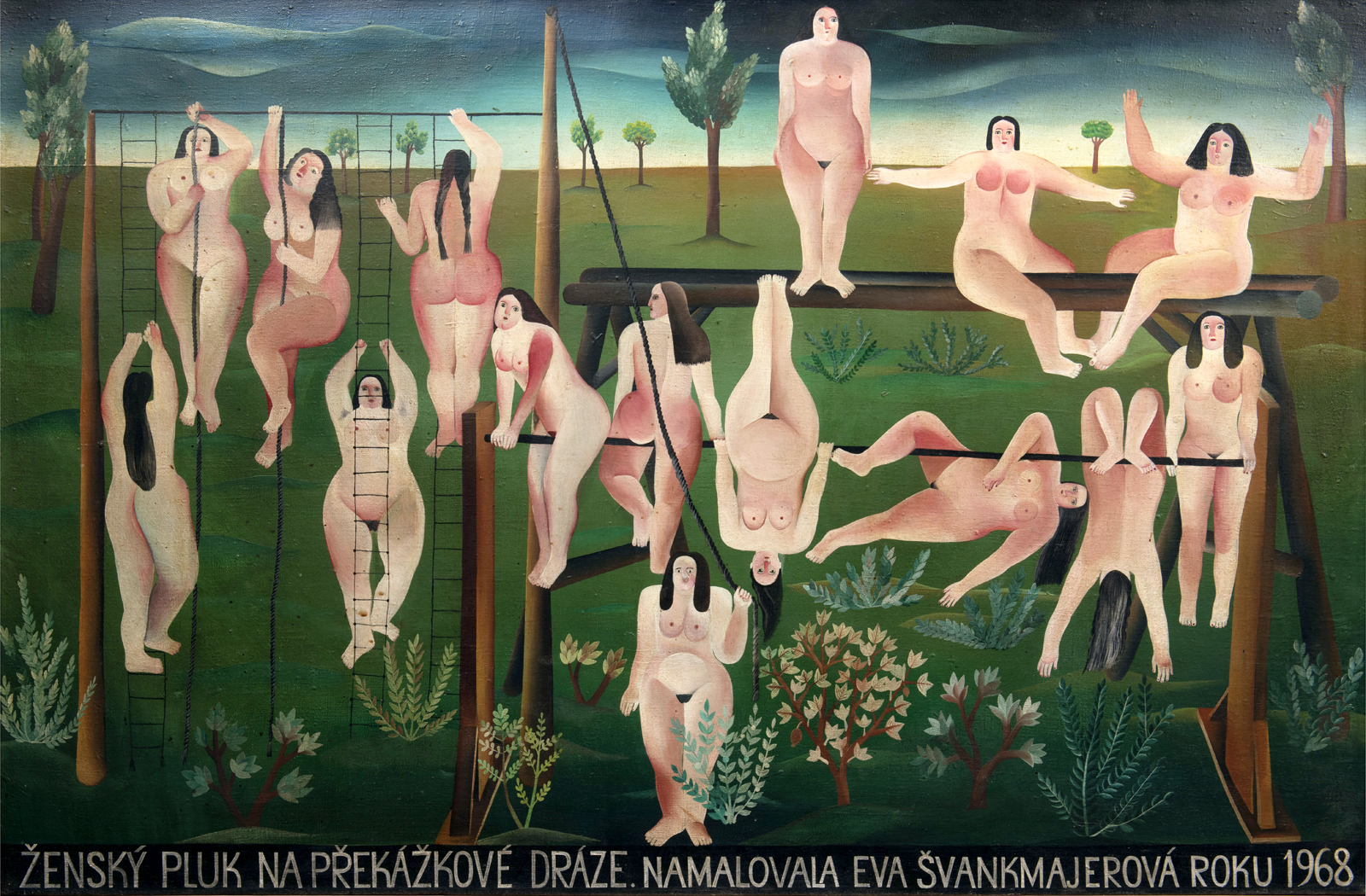
Women's Regiment on an Hurdle Course, 1968, oil, 80x120 cm

In 1994, an existential series of paintings on the theme Vanitas was created in which persons, props and sets overlap each other to create an illusory skull.

Eva Švankmajerová also copes with her illness in her drawings (All in Time, 1997). She has also worked in the medium of collage, and after 1998, when she visited the Art brut exhibition in Prague, she created a number of mediumistic drawings. She found in them a liberating and relieving power and until 2004 they were one of her main artistic outputs.

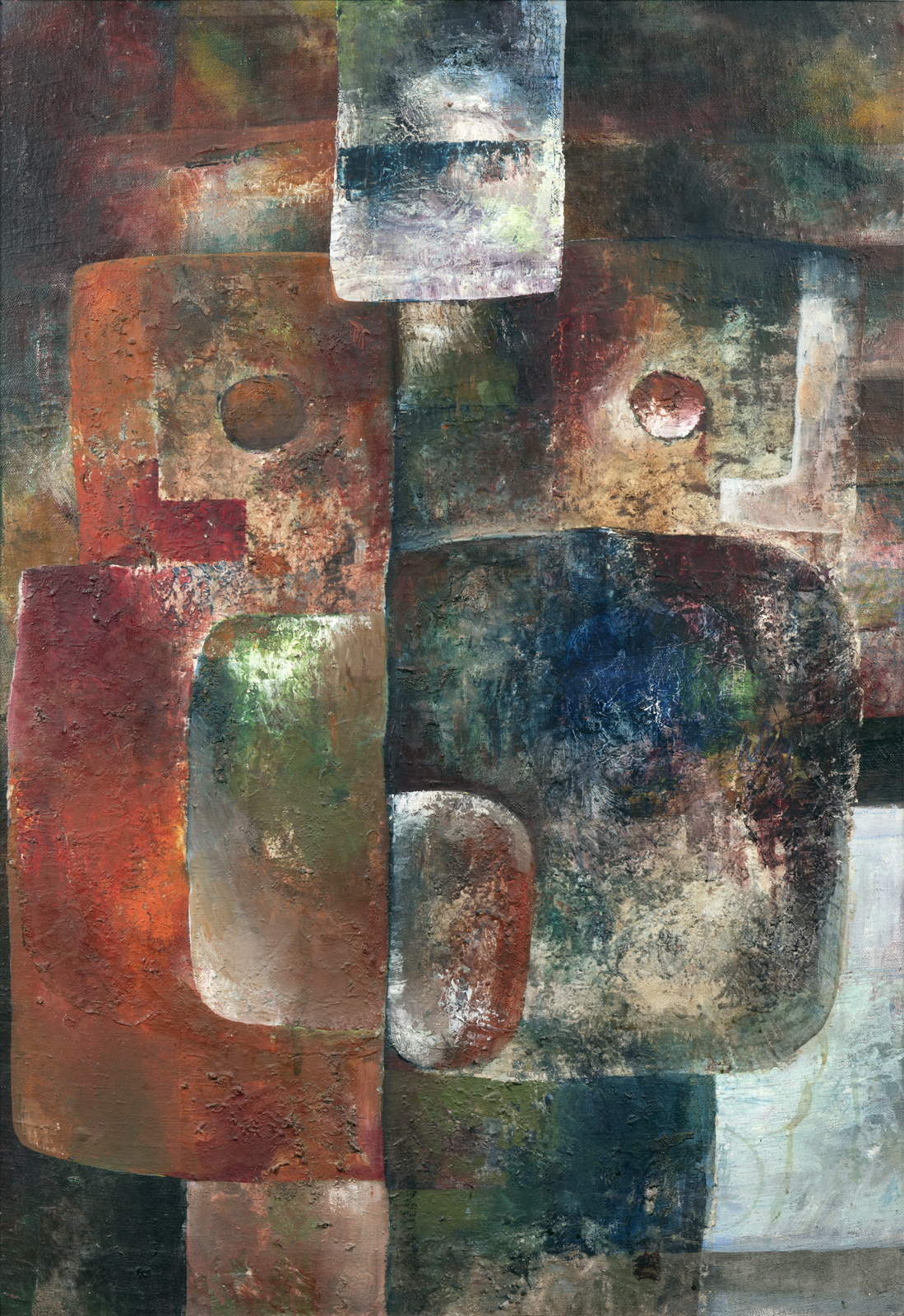
Woman, 1963, oil, 83x57 cm

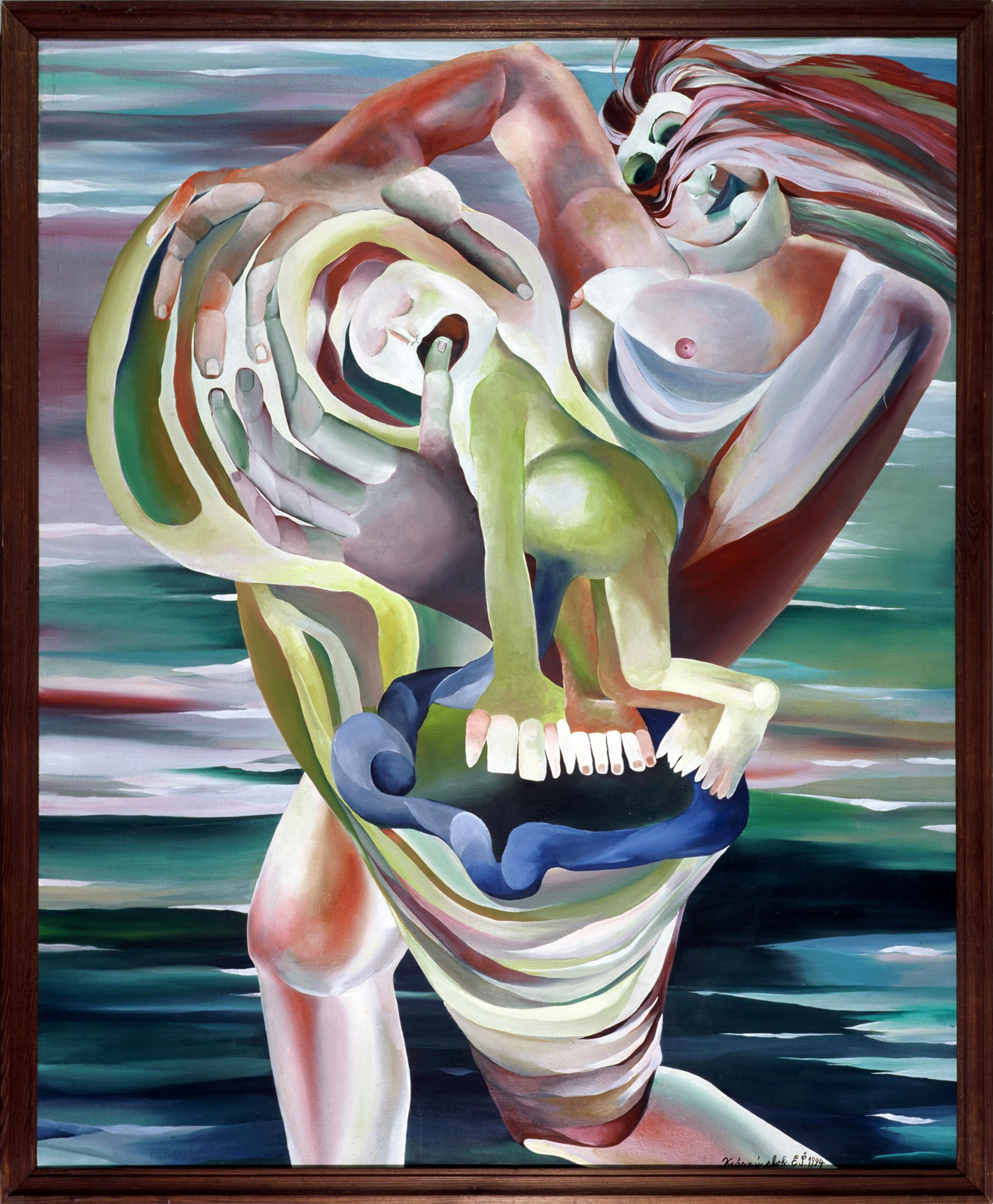
Vanitas - Beautiful Style, 1994, oil, 110x90 cm

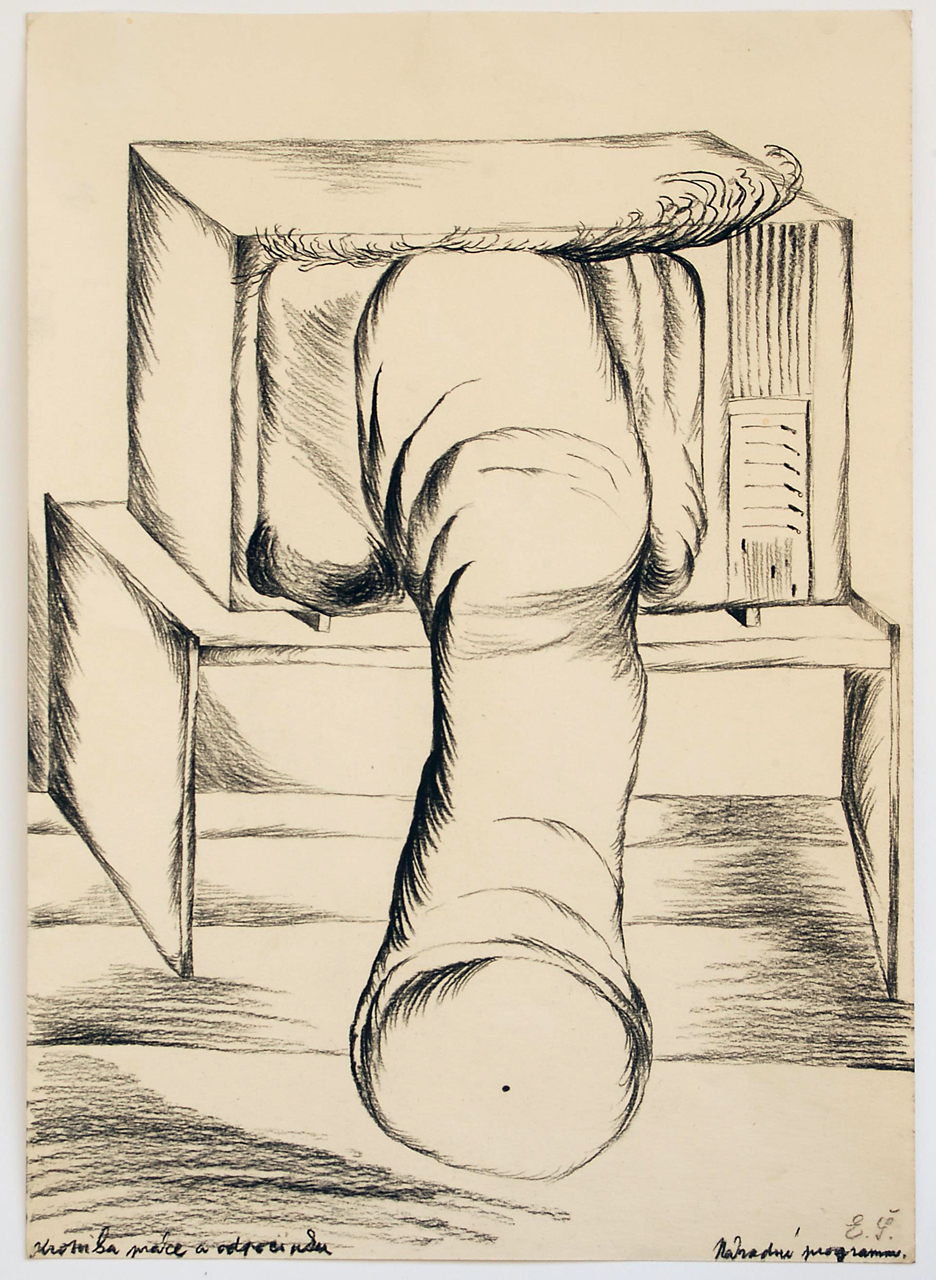
Chronicle of work and rest. Alternative program, pencil on paper

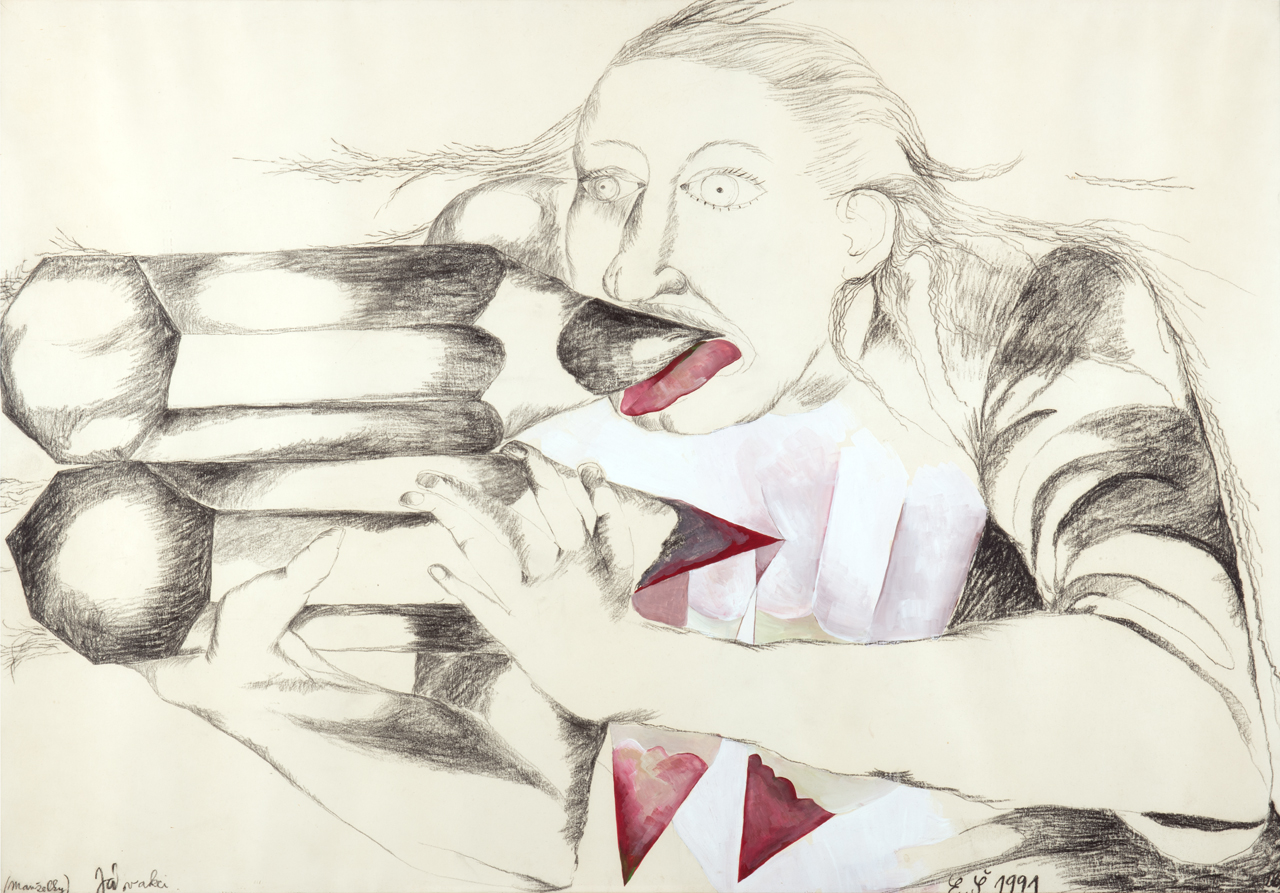
Me in Action, 1991, charcoal, tempera on paper, 88x61cm

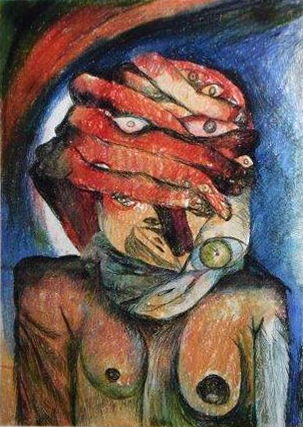
Untitled, mediumistic drawing, pastel

=== Ceramics ===
The art to spin pottery on a potter's wheel and fire it in a kiln Eva learned from local potters in Kostelec nad Černými lesy. From the mid-1970s onwards, she and Jan Švankmajer created objects in their own ceramics workshop that denied the utilitarian function of ceramics and stimulated the imagination. A common feature of the objects made using the majolica technique (ceramic clay and cinnamon white glaze) is the recurring reference to the human body and natural forms, all with a hint of latent animation. Some were made as a continuous series, reminiscent of phase animation (Birth, 1996). Their new applied art is an attempt to return the outwardly utilitarian activity to its magical dimension, to give irrationality back its legitimacy (Erotic Bowl, 1978, Sitting Pitcher, Working Pitcher, 1986).

Since 1995, she has been creating ceramic busts as imaginary portraits of members of the Surrealist group. Her Homage to the Marquise de Sade takes the form of a set of mutually copulating ceramic jugs.

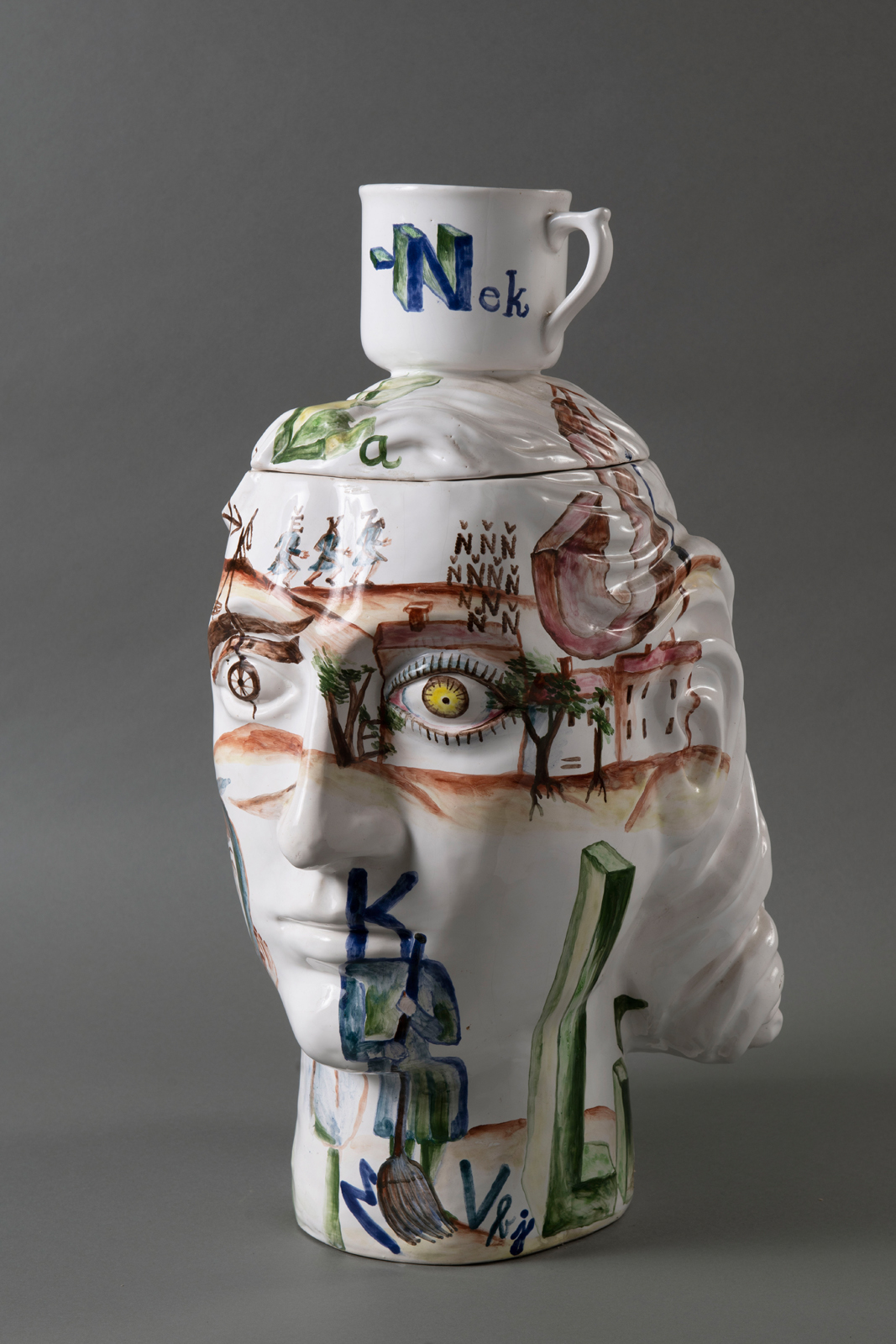
Dona Anna as a rebus (jar), 1978, majolica, 51 cm

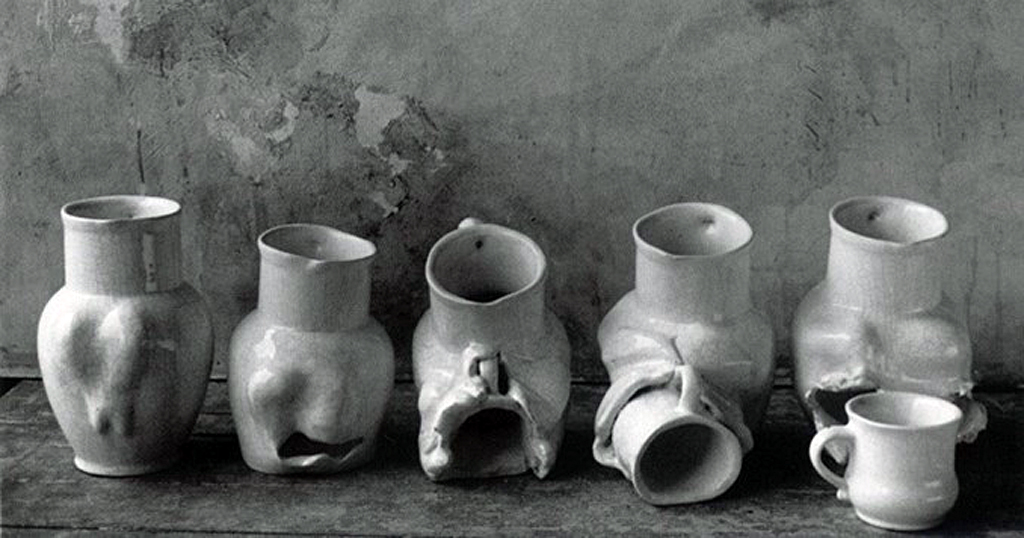
Birth, 1996, majolica

=== Costumes, set design, film posters ===
After her return to Prague from emigration at the end of 1968, she designed the costumes for Alena Vostrá's play On the Edge of the Knife at the Činoherní klub theatre and in 1970 the poster for the Belgian distribution of the avant-garde film Fruit of Paradise by Věra Chytilová. During the normalization period, she made living as a costume designer for theatre (including Candide, The Educator, and the Golden Carriage at the Činoherní klub), set designs for animated films (Jiří Brdečka), and posters for exhibitions. Together with Jan Švankmajer, she created the set and scenery for the 1975 performance The Lost Fairy Tale at Magician's Lantern (directed by Jaromil Jireš). In 1977, Juraj Herz used her drawings in the film fairy tale The Ninth Heart. In 1979, she created the poster for the film Love Between the Raindrops by Karel Kachyňa.

In 1983 she was the author of the set design for the Jan Švankmajer's horror film The Pendulum, the Pit and Hope. Her infernal machine that moves convict toward the death pit has figurative moving panels inspired by medieval paintings depicting hell. Eva Švankmajerová also contributed to the artwork for all of Jan Švankmajer's feature films until 2005, starting with Alice (1988), then Faust (1994) and Little Otik (2000). She designed the costumes and the puppet-fetish for Conspirators of Pleasure (1996). Jan Švankmajer's final film in which she participated as a set and costume designer was Lunacy (2004).

In 1987, she created the sets for the animated part of the performance Ulysses at Magician's Lantern (directed by Evald Schorm).

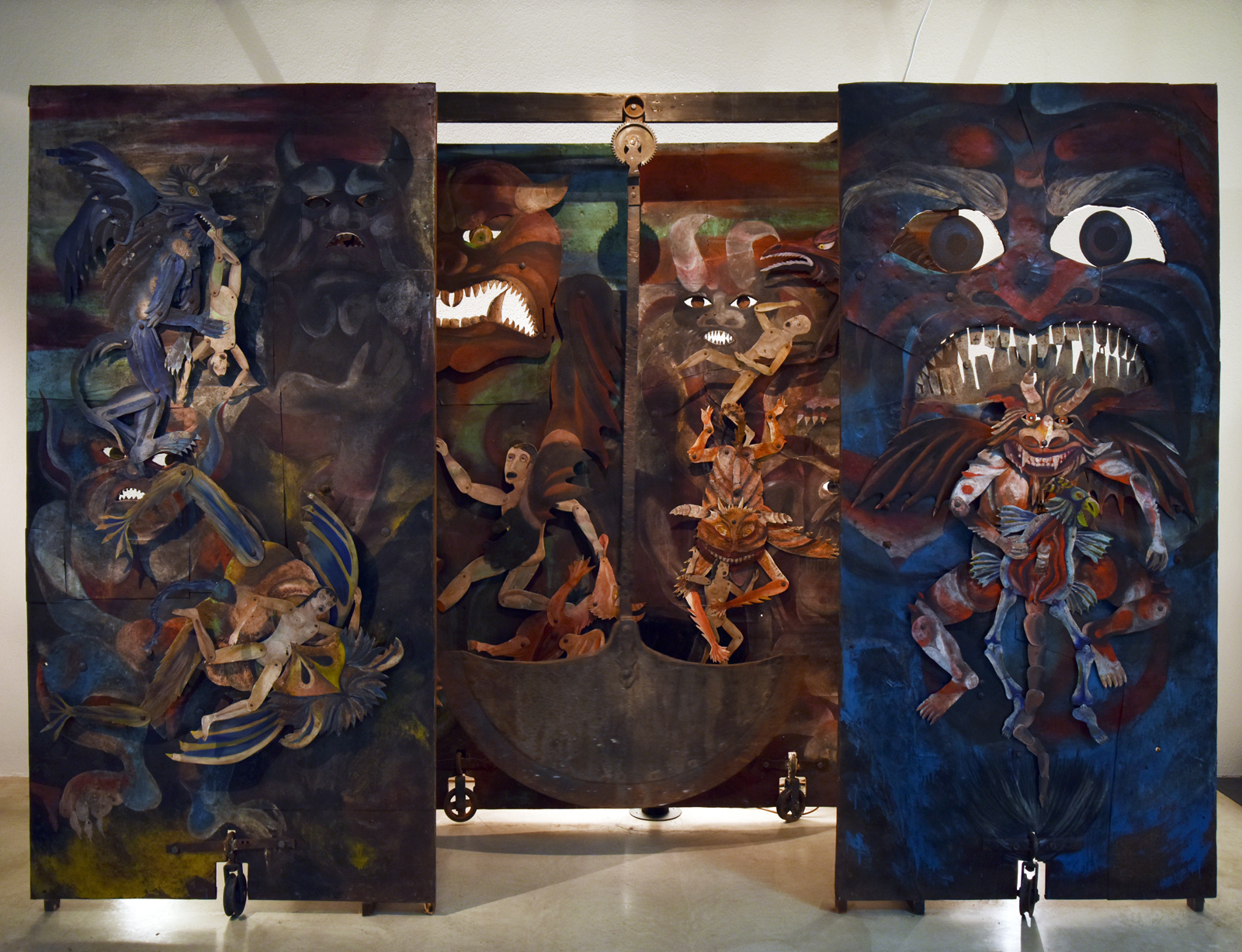
Metal wall with moving elements for the film The Pendulum, the Pit and Hope (1983)

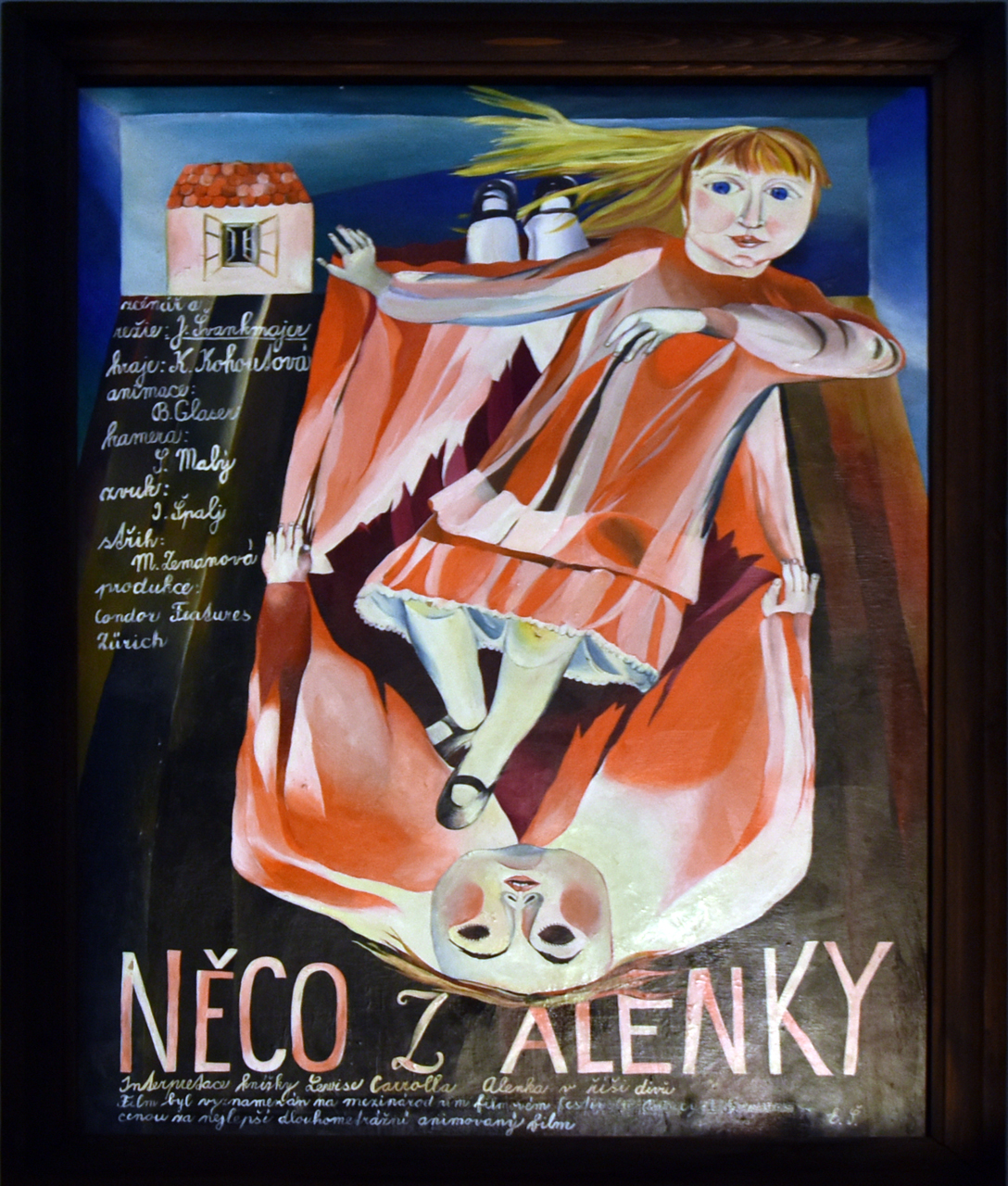
Alice, film poster (1988)

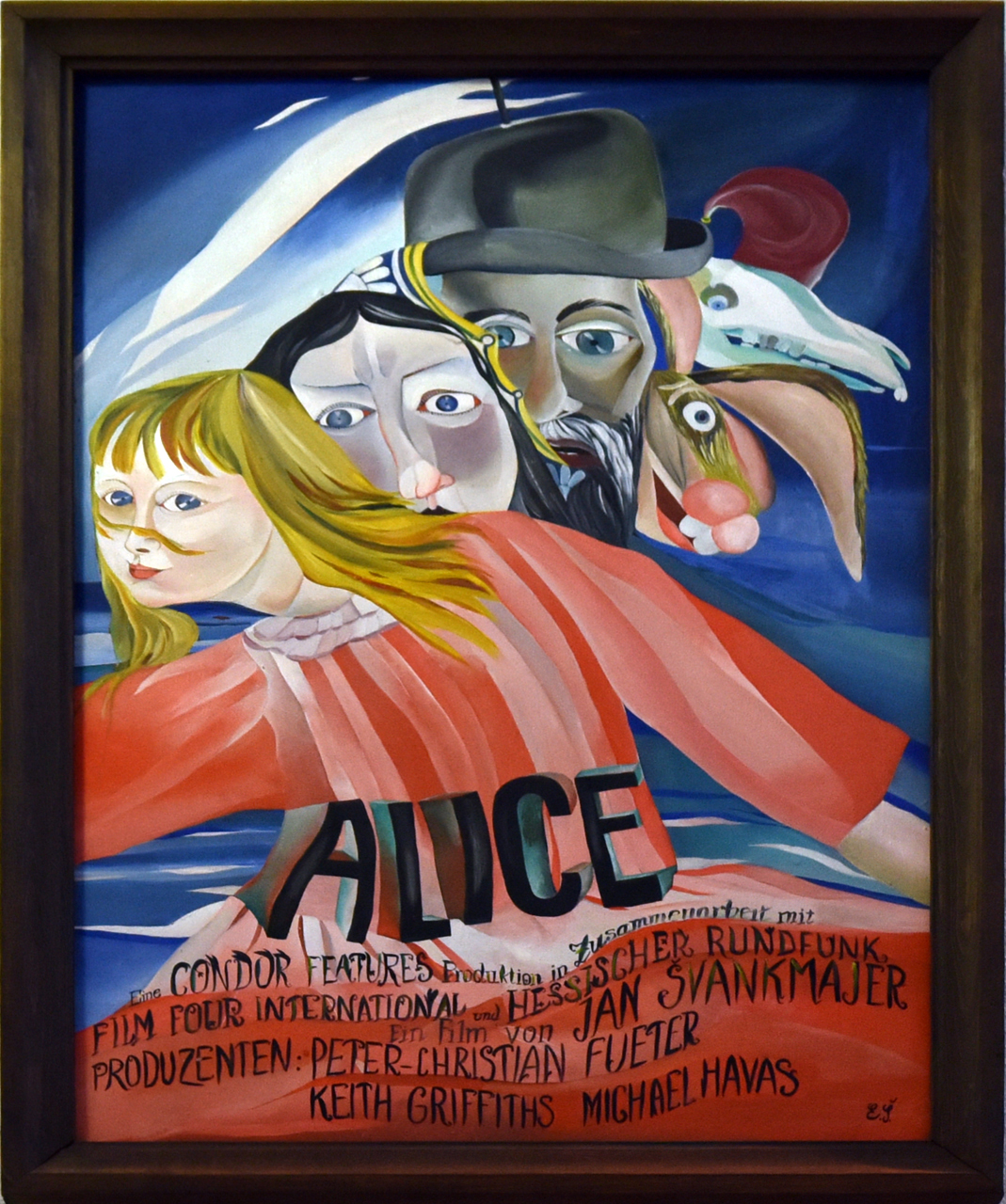
Alice, film poster (1988)

=== Literary work ===
In 1970, at Eva Švankmajerová's solo exhibition at Nová síň Gallery, someone stole the manuscript of her unpublished literary debut Anna's Heart. The Surrealist group in Czechoslovakia organised a collective inquiry on eroticism and in 1977 published as a samizdat the single copy of the anthology Erotism in Contemporary Times, which later became part of the object-book Night Table. At a meeting of the Surrealist Group, she brought a text written in the style of Marquis de Sade and invited Vratislav Effenberger to continue. The correspondence eventually led to the novel Whips of Conscience, completed in 1978 and published by dybbuk publishing house in 2010.

In 1976 she wrote a play, Judgement, which was not printed until 2021. In 1981 she published a book, The Baradla Cave, as a printed samizdat with illustrations under the protection of the publishing house Le La in Geneva. The book is one of the highlights of Czechoslovak post-war surrealism and a completely unique concept of deconstruction of the ideas about the social role of women. In 1986, Eva's poems were published in the anthology Opposite of the Mirror / Surrealist Poetry and in 1987 separately in the collection Solitudes and Quotations under the label of the Geneva publishing house Le La.

She wrote the script for the animated film Little Otik (Czech: Otesánek) based on Karel Jaromír Erben folktale. Jan Švankmajer eventually decided to make Little Otik as a feature film with actors and integrated the animation into it.

In Eva Švankmajerova's texts, both admitted and unacknowledged and then denied vulnerability, to which is attached the infantile need to find the guilty party, manifests itself in an almost sadomasochistic urge to project one's own frustrations and traumas onto the immediate surroundings. This results in frenzied, even paranoid, as well as cold and calculatingly critical constructs in which the boundaries between reality and fantasy are blurred, despair is conflated and confused with hope, crying with laughter and rage with desire. In her painted and annotated journals there are thus fatal confessions and anecdotal stories, partial observations of simple particulars and generalising maxims, sarcastic polemics, kindly blasphemies and hateful epistles.

=== Cinema ===
- Ztracená pohádka / The Lost Fairy Tale (1976), Magician's Lantern, art designer, director: Jaromil Jireš
- Odysseus Magician's Lantern (1987) art designer of animated parts, director: Evald Schorm

=== Filmography ===
==== Short films ====
- The Last Trick (1964), assistant of production
- The Garden (1968), costume designer
- Jsouc na řece mlynář jeden / There was a miller on the river (1971), art designer, animated film by Jiří Brdečka
- The Pendulum, the Pit and Hope (1983), partnership on production design
- Jost Bürgi – Demystifikace času a prostoru / Demystification of time and space (1986) designer of animated parts, director: Michael Havas

==== Feature films ====
- The Ninth Heart, special effects, poster (director: Juraj Herz)
- Something from Alice (1988), production design
- Faust (1994), co-production Eva Švankmajerová
- Conspirators of Pleasure (1996), costumes
- Little Otik (2000), costumes
- Lunacy (2005), costumes, Czech Oscar nomination

=== Bibliography ===
- Samoty a citace / Solitudes and Quotations, poems, samizdat, Le La, Geneva, Surrealist Group Prague 1984
- Jeskyně Baradla / The Baradla Cave, novel, samizdat, Geneva 1981; Analogon Association: Capricorn, Prague 1995, ISBN 80-238-0583-5
- Anima Animus Animace / Anima Animus Animation, Arbor Vitae and Slovart, Prague 1997 (with Jan Švankmajer)
- Otesánek / Little Otik, Suiseiša, Tokio 2001
- G. Dierna, ed., Memoria dell´animazione - Animazione Della memoria, Milano 2003
- Dosud nenamalované obrazy / Paintings Not Yet Painted, poems, Torst Prague 2003, ISBN 80-7215-195-9
- Otesánek / Little Otik, leporelo, 24 p., Arbor Vitae, 2004, ISBN 80-86300-40-4
- Biče svědomí / Whips of Conscience, Dybbuk, Prague 2010 (with Vratislav Effenberger)
- Zvuk dýní v zákulisí / The Sound of Pumpkins Behind the Scenes, Dybbuk, Prague 2021

==== Anthology ====
- F. Dryje, P. Řezníček (eds.), Letenka do noci / The Flight Ticket into the Night (anthology of surrealist poetry), Petrov, Brno 2003, pp. 77–90
- S. Glovjuk, D. Dobiáš (eds.), Z věku na věk / From Age to Age (anthology of Czech poetry), Moscow 2005, pp. 190–195
- J. Nejedlý, R. Kopáč (eds.), Jezdec na delfíně / Rider on a Dolphin (anthology of Czech erotic literature 1990–2005), Concordia, Prague 2005
- P. Rosemont, ed., Surrealist Women: An International Anthology, Univ. Texas, Austin 1998, pp. 399–404
- Z. Gabrišová, ed., Milá Mácho / Dear (she) Mácho - Anthology of Czech Women Poets 1857-2014, Větrné mlýny, Brno 2022

=== Representation in collections ===
- National Gallery Prague
- Tate Gallery
- Czech Museum of Fine Arts in Prague (currently Gallery of the Central Bohemian Region in Kutná Hora)
- South Bohemian Gallery in Hluboká nad Vltavou
- Gallery of Art Karlovy Vary
- Klatovy-Klenová Gallery
- Museum of Art Olomouc
- private collections at home and abroad

=== Exhibitions (selection) ===
==== Authors ====
- 1967 Eva Švankmajerová: Obrazy z let 1964–1966 / Paintings from 194-199, Youth Gallery, Mánes Prague
- 1969 Eva Švankmajerová, Regional Museum Písek
- 1970 Eva Švankmajerová, Nová síň Gallery, Prague
- 1972 Eva Švankmajerová, Galerie Mensch, Hamburg
- 1973 Eva Švankmajerová, Laden Galerie, Berlin
- 1977 Eva Švankmajerová, Jan Švankmajer: Infantile Lüste, Galerie Sonnerring, Münster
- 1982 Eva Švankmajerová: Desátý dům / The Tenth House, Film Club, Prague
- 1985 Eva Švankmajerová: Utajené vary / Secret Boils, Junior club, Prague
- 1987 Eva Švankmajerová, Jan Švankmajer: Bouillonnements Cachés, Brussels, Tournai
- 1991 Eva Švankmajerová, Jan Švankmajer: La Contamination des sens, Annecy
- 1991/1992 Eva Švankmajerová: Císařský řez / Caesarean section, Václav Špála Gallery, Prague
- 1992 Eva Švankmajerová a Jan Švankmajer: Cyfleu breuddwydion / The Communication of Dreams, Cardiff, Bristol
- 1994 Eva Švankmajerová a Jan Švankmajer: El llentguatge de l'analogia, Sitges, Spain
- 1995 Eva Švankmajerová a Jan Švankmajer: Athanor, Telluride, Colorado, United States
- 1997 Eva Švankmajerová a Jan Švankmajer: Sixty One Pieces, London, Mluvící malířství, němá poezie / Speaking Painting, Silent Poetry, Obecní galerie Beseda, Prague, Přírodopisný kabinet / Natural History Cabinet, Jan Sudek Gallery, Prague
- 1998 Eva Švankmajerová a Jan Švankmajer: Anima, Animus, Animace, U bílého jednorožce, Klatovy, Egon Schiele Art Centrum, Český Krumlov, Regional gallery of Highlands, Jihlava, East Bohemian Gallery, Pardubice
- 1998 Eva Švankmajerová, Jan Švankmajer: Paracabinet, Gallery of Modern Art, Hradec Králové
- 2001 Eva Švankmajerová, Jan Švankmajer: Imaginativní oko, imaginativní ruka / Imaginative eye, imaginative hand, Jiří and Běla Kolář Gallery, Prague
- 2002 Eva Švankmajerová, Jan Švankmajer: Bouche à bouche, Annecy
- 2003 Eva Švankmajerová, Jan Švankmajer, Galerie les yeux fertiles, Paris
- 2003 Eva Švankmajerová, Jan Švankmajer: Mediumní kresby a fetiše / Mediumistic drawings and fetishes, Nová Paka, Animazione della memoria - Memoria dell´animazioonne, Palazzo Pigorini and Galleria San Ludovico, Parma
- 2004 Eva Švankmajerová, Jan Švankmajer: Paměť animace, animace paměti / Memory of animation, animation of memory, City Gallery, Plzeň
- 2004 Portrét / Portrait, Exhibition Hall Sokolovská 26, Ostrava
- 2004 Eva Švankmajerová, Jan Švankmajer: Jídlo, retrospektivní výstava 1958–2004 / Food, a retrospective exhibition, 1958-2004, Prague Castle Riding Hall
- 2005 Eva Švankmajerová, Jan Švankmajer: Gaudia, The Museum of Modern Art, Hayama, Nitsu Museum of Art, Japan
- 2006 Eva Švankmajerová, Deník 1963–2005 / Diary 1963-2005, Václav Špála Gallery, Prague
- 2007 Jan Švankmajer, Eva Švankmajerová, Laforet Harajuku, Tokyo
- 2010 Transmutación de los sentidos, Muces, European film festival Segovia
- 2011 Jan Švankmajer, Eva Švankmajerová, Laforet Harajuku, Tokyo
- 2012 Jan Švankmajer, Eva Švankmajerová, Bunka Hakubutsukan, Kyoto
- 2012 Jiný vzduch, Skupina československých surrealistů / Other Air, Czechoslovak Surrealist Group, Old Town Hall, Prague, Czech centrum, Brussels
- 2014 Metamorphosis, Centre de la Cultura Contemporania de Barcelona
- 2015 Eva Švankmajerová 75-10/ Obrazy a kresby / Paintings and drawings, Old Town Hall, Prague
- 2018 Eva Švankmajerová, Vše marno / All in vain, Kostelec nad Černými lesy
- 2018-2022 Wonderland, Melbourne, Wellington, Singapore, Perth
- 2019 The Medium´s Medium, The Gallery of Everything, London
- 2019/2020 Eva Švankmajerová a Jan Švankmajer, Move Little Hands, Move!, Kunsthalle im Lippsiusbau, Dresden
- 2024 Eva Švankmajerová a Jan Švankmajer, Disegno Interno, Gallery of the Central Bohemian Region, Kutná Hora
- 2024 Eva Švankmajerová, Emancipation (1967/69), The Gallery of Everything, Frieze Masters London
- 2025 Eva Švankmajerová, retrospective, DOX, Prague

=== Awards ===
- 1994 Czech Lion Award for the best artistic achievement (Faust)
- 2001 Czech Lion Award for the best artistic achievement (Little Otik)
- 2001 Czech Lion Award for the best film poster (Little Otik)
- 2005 Czech Lion Award for the best film poster (Lunacy)
- 2005 Czech Lion Award for the best artistic achievement (Lunacy), film was nominated for Academy Awards

== Sources ==
=== Monographs ===
- Eva Švankmajerová. Jsem malířka / I am a painter., text F. Dryje, B. Schmitt, J. Švankmajer, Š. Wilkström Svěrák, 408 pp., KAVKA, Prague 2023, ISBN 978-80-908575-9-9 3 min. video
- František Dryje: Eva Švankmajerová, Arbor Vitae and Athanor, Prague 2006, ISBN 80-86300-71-4

=== Catalogues (selection) ===
- Imaginativní oko, imaginativní ruka / Imaginative eye, imaginative hand (with Jan Švankmajer), Vltavín, Prague 2001, ISBN 80-902674-7-5
- Dagmar Magincová (ed.), Evašvankmajerjan / Anima Animus Animace, Arbor Vitae and Slovart, 1997, ISBN 80-901964-3-8
- Desátý dům / The Tenth House, catalogue of the banned exhibition by Eva Švankmajerová, samizdat, Le La, Prague 1982
- Infantile Lüste, catalogue of the exhibition, Galerie Sonnenring, Münster 1977 (with Jan Švankmajer)

=== General sources ===
- Stanislav Drvota, Osobnost a tvorba, Avicenum Praha 1973

=== Encyclopedias ===
- Anděla Horová (ed), The New Czech Encyclopedia of Fine Arts N-Z, 558 s., Academia, publishing house of the Academy of Sciences of the Czech Republic 1995, ISBN 80-200-0522-6
- Dictionary of Czech and Slovak Visual Artists 1950-2003 (XI. Pau - Pop), Chagall Art Centre, Ostrava 2003

=== Articles ===
- Marianna Placáková, "Teď když už mám druhé dítě, vypadám lépe. Tváře mi plandají pravidelně (Now that I have my second child, I look better. My cheeks are sagging regularly)." Eva Švankmajerová, Art & Antiques, April 2024
- Marianna Placáková, Emancipation Despite Circumstances: The Prague Spring, (Dis)engagement on the Art Scene and the Emergence of Feminist Consciousness among Women Artists, Art vol. 70, 2022 (4), p. 383
- Mirka Spáčilová, RECENZE: Vše o Evě. Film o Švankmajerovi se mění v milostné vyznání (REVIEW: All About Eva. A film about Švankmajer turns into a declaration of love), iDNES 4.12.2020 on line
