= Mass media in the Czech Republic =

The mass media in the Czech Republic refers to mass communication methods through broadcasting, publishing, and the Internet and their influence on population.

== History ==
In November 1989, Czechoslovakia transitioned to a liberal democracy through the peaceful "Velvet Revolution" (led by Václav Havel and his Civic Forum). In the following years the country went through a rapid economic transformation. This also affected the media that became free of the heavy-handed control of the Communist Party of Czechoslovakia and were able to develop in a competitive environment. However, even before the Velvet Revolution and despite the persecutions, there were illegally published magazines within the Samizdat phenomenon, which allowed for the circulation of dissident ideas among people who possessed positions of cultural power and authority. Václav Havel – the last president of Czechoslovakia from 1989 until its dissolution in 1992 – was one of them. Since the Soviet Union’s dissolution, most Czech media outlets have been owned by non-Czech western companies. This situation changed after the 2008 financial crisis and the Great Recession, when many of them were acquired by Czech firms. In early 2014, eight out of the ten most influential figures in the media were Czech or Slovak.

== Media outlets ==
=== Print and online media ===
Czech Republic has four main daily newspapers: Lidové noviny (former dissident publication); Mladá fronta DNES (with a centre-right orientation); Právo (with a centre-left political position) and Blesk, all based in Prague. Both Lidové noviny and Mladá fronta DNES are a part of the MAFRA publishing group, owned by Andrej Babiš, the current Prime Minister of the Czech Republic. As of 2018, the MAFRA group is a part of a trust fund along with other Babiš's companies.

Blesk, a tabloid newspaper, with more than 1 million readers per average issue is the most-read national daily newspaper. Blesk’s publisher Czech News Center also publishes Aha!, another tabloid newspaper which focuses on the news about the Czech celebrities. Overall the country accounts for 7 print news outlets and over 20 online news portals.

There has been a decline in circulation on Czech daily newspapers since 2009, which slowed down in 2016. In the same year Seznam Zpravy and Info.cz were launched. The first one, a news site combining daily video, text-based news and video commentaries, was introduced by the country’s leading web portal and second-biggest search engine Seznam.cz and has quickly become the top online news media in the country. On the other hand, Info.cz was launched by the Czech News Center as a news server with the aim of emphasising quality information.

Finally, the Czech News Agency (Česká tisková kancelář or ČTK in Czech), previously the national state press agency, is the first and main Czech media with domestic and foreign information services. As it is not financed with state budget, its income derives from selling news to subscribers.

=== Television and radio ===
Commercial television has a major place in the Czech media landscape and attracts almost half of the total advertising spend. Before the collapse of communism, the only broadcaster in Czech Republic was the Czechoslovak Television, which was transformed into the public service broadcaster “Czech Television” in 1992. Czech Television operates two terrestrial public broadcast channels: mainstream CT1 and cultural channel CT2, while CT24 (for news) is a digital public channel. The first national commercial licence was granted to Television Nova in 1993. The TV station soon gained a dominant position on the television market managing to keep it so far. Prima televize is the second private national TV channel. Broadcast media regulatory authority is the Council for Radio and Television Broadcasting (RRTV), while public-service ČT is regulated by its own council.

== Legal framework ==
Freedom of the press and freedom of speech are guaranteed by the Charter of Fundamental Rights and Freedoms. In Division Two of the Charter, Article 17, these expression rights are defined: however, the Charter prohibits speech that might infringe on national security, individual rights, public health, or morality. Defamation is still a crime in the country, although in 2005 the Constitutional Court ruling found that value judgement is legally protected. Cross-ownership in the media industry is legally limited under the Law on Radio and Television Broadcasting No. 231 of 2001, which defines the license and regulation policy for broadcasting and the role of Council for Radio and Television Broadcasting. However, these ownership restrictions do not apply to foreign ownership and are considered to be “minimal” by some observers. Other important regulations are the Press Law (No. 46/2000), the Act on Czech Television No. 483 and the Act on Czech Radio No. 484. Both began to apply in 1991 and have been amended several times. They provide on the so-called “small” councils that control only Czech Radio and Czech TV (ČT). Moreover, Law No. 106 of 1999 regulates the Free Access to Information, Law No. 45 of 1995 regulates Advertisements and the discipline regarding copyright is provided by Law No. 35 of 1996.

== Media freedom and censorship ==
In 2021 Reporters without Borders (RSF) ranked Czechia 40 out of 180 countries in its 2021 World Press Freedom Index, down from 13 in 2015. However RSF also underlined the fact that in recent years there had been a “rise of the oligarchs” in the media landscape, and stated that the public broadcaster Czech Television "is facing an upheaval after some of the members of its supervisory board were replaced by well-known figures who are very critical of investigative reporting". In its 2016 report, Freedom House stated that criminal defamation, concentrated media ownership as well as ownership of media by politicians as the main obstacles for media freedom. In 2021 Freedom House stated that Prime Minister Andrej Babiš had been increasing his control over Czech media since 2013, when he bought Mafra media group. During the Covid-19 pandemic Mafra benefited disproportionately from state aid. Some notable incidents concerning censorship and media freedom took place in the country:

- Legislative ambiguities and contradictions emerged at the time of the banning of Adolf Hitler's Mein Kampf, in 2000.
- In 2003 Karel Srba, a former general secretary of the Czech Foreign Ministry, has been convicted of plotting to murder Sabina Slonková – an investigative reporter of daily newspaper Mlada Fronta Dnes who had been writing about corruption inside the Ministry.
- In 2011, a raid by military police took place in the offices of Czech Television in Prague.
- In 2017, a leaked audio recording caught the leader of ANO 2011 party, former Deputy Prime Minister and Finance Minister Andrej Babiš, instructing a journalist on how to attack his political rivals. Many European parliamentarians condemned the alleged actions of Andrej Babiš, but also stressed that this case resembles more a failure of a single politician, rather than a manifestation of the government’s systematic abuse of media.
- Current general manager of Czech Television Jan Souček has courted controversy in his tenure given his attack on free media and his attacks on employees of Czech Television. Souček compared himself to Milada Horáková after strong criticism of his managerial skills from Czech Television Council. Souček later commented that it was silly from him. In an interview on 5. 9. 2023‌ Souček, as the incoming director general, stated: "I am constantly asking for money. A press conference of the Ministry of Culture has been announced for Tuesday, where the ministerial commission should reveal how it envisions the reform of financing public service media. According to my information, our call will be heard for the most part." During his tenure, Souček constantly asks for more money from the public fees, however it seems that he is not able to use money economically while blacking out financial documents to hide it from the public.

== Disinformation ==
According to the Prague Security Studies Institute, there is a pro-Russian disinformation campaign originating from numerous pro-Russian websites, social media communities, printed periodicals as well as radio broadcasts targeting Czechs and Slovaks.

Following the 2022 Russian invasion of Ukraine, the private association CZ.NIC, which administers the .cz web domains, blocked 8 websites considered to be used for Russian propaganda. David Kotora, from Transparency International Czech Republic, confirmed that the sites blocked have been used by Russia to spread propaganda for many years. He however also warned against censorship type of measures that should be limited in time in order not to stifle the freedom of speech.

== Media ownership ==
Under the leadership of the Communist Party of Czechoslovakia, all mass media in Czechoslovakia were governed by the state, state organisations or political parties. Since the Soviet Union's dissolution, most Czech newspapers used to be owned by non-Czech western conglomerates: until 2007, 70% of Czech magazines and newspapers were owned by German and Swiss corporations. The process of the media returning to Czech ownership started with the 2008 financial crisis. The restructuring of ownership culminated in 2015 when the German Verlagsgruppe Passau, the last major non-Czech European media group in the country, left the market: it sold its local publishing house Vltava Labe Media to Penta Investments, which owns media holdings both in the Czech Republic and in Slovakia. Despite this media ownership turmoil, research shows that journalists are not affected by the ownership change and tend to view journalism ethics and the ability of journalism to exert power more seriously than before. The new ownership structure of Czech media led to an increase in live news coverage, tabloid-style content and so-called Google journalism, although investigative journalism is still strong in the country. On the other hand, the increase of the ownership concentration presents a threat to the media pluralism of the country. Andrej Babiš, former Czech Prime Minister, owns two of the most influential daily newspapers (Lidové Noviny and Mlada Fronta Dnes) and one of the most popular news website iDnes.cz. However, some experts consider the Czech Republic to be one of the hubs in the EU territory for the few Pan-European media companies controlling large part of broadcasting market in Europe.

== See also ==
- List of newspapers in the Czech Republic
- List of radio stations in the Czech Republic
- Battle of Czechoslovak Radio
