= Czech Media Invest =

Czech media holding company

- Industry: Mass media
- Founded: 2011
- Headquarters: Prague, Czech Republic
- Key people: Daniel Křetínský (chairman)
- Products: Newspapers, magazines, books, radio broadcasting, digital media
- Revenue: 487,235,000 euro (2023)
- Operating income: −43,101,000 euro (2023)
- Net income: −88,452,000 euro (2023)
- Total assets: 12,549,000,000 Czech koruna (2022)
- Owner: EP Group (50%); J&T Capital Partners (40%); TYMON (10%)
- Number of employees: 2,302 (2023)
- Subsidiaries: Czech News Center; Czech Radio Center; Czech Video Center; International Media Invest; CMI News
- Website: www.czechmediainvest.cz/en/

Czech Media Invest a.s. (CMI) is a Czech media holding company with interests in newspaper and magazine publishing, radio broadcasting and digital media. Its businesses include Czech News Center, Czech Radio Center, CMI France and the French book publisher Editis. The group operates in the Czech Republic and France, with additional operations in Romania. The company is one of the most influential media houses in the Czech Republic.

== History ==
CMI's Czech publishing business originated with Daniel Křetínský and Patrik Tkáč's acquisition of Ringier Axel Springer Media's Czech operations (Ringier Axel Springer CZ a.s.). Announced in December 2013 and completed in April 2014, the deal included the newspapers Blesk (the most-read and best-selling national daily newspaper in the Czech Republic), Aha! and Sport, and the weekly magazine Reflex.

CMI expanded into radio broadcasting in 2018, acquiring Lagardère's operations in the Czech Republic, Poland, Slovakia and Romania for €73 million. The acquisition included the Czech stations Evropa 2 and Frekvence 1. That year, CMI also acquired the French magazine Marianne and an indirect stake in Le Monde.

The group's French publishing business grew with the acquisition of Télé 7 Jours and the French edition of Elle from Lagardère in 2019. CMI then acquired Editis in November 2023. Subsequently CMI launched the French television channel T18 in June 2025.

As of June 2026, the shareholders of CMI were EP Group (50%, controlled by Daniel Křetínský), J&T CAPITAL PARTNERS, a.s. (40%, part of J&T Private Equity Group) and TYMON a.s. (10%, controlled by Roman Korbačka).
