= List of newspapers in the Czech Republic =

In 1995 there were eight national newspapers in the Czech Republic and their total circulation was about 1.8 million copies. The number of daily newspapers was 96 in 2004.

== Major national newspapers ==
Name	Publisher	Type	Circulation in thousands (2018)	Readership in thousands (2015)
Metro	MAFRA	freesheet, regional	276	470
Blesk	Czech News Center	tabloid	199	1,028
Mladá fronta DNES	MAFRA	serious, right	116	654
Deník	Vltava-Labe-Press	regional	107	652
Právo	Borgis	serious, left	69	303
Aha!	Czech News Center	tabloid	44	233
e15	Czech News Center	freesheet, economy	44	70
Hospodářské noviny	Economia	serious, economy	34	157
Sport	Czech News Center	sport only	33	256
Lidové noviny	subsidiary of MAFRA	serious, centre-right	32	210
Haló noviny	Futura	serious, far left	?	N/A
Denník N	N Media a.s.	serious	?	?

Paid classified advertising newspaper Anonce is published four times per week, with a circulation of 306 thousand copies in 2015.

This is a list of weekly newspapers published in the Czech Republic, not including magazines.

Name	Publisher	Type	Press run in thousands (2018)	Readership in thousands (2012)
5plus2	AGF Media	freesheet	738	918
Nedělní Blesk	Czech News Center	tabloid	101	594
Nedělní Aha	Czech News Center	tabloid	39	156
Katolický týdeník	Katolický týdeník s.r.o.	religious	36	200
Nedělní Sport	Czech News Center	sport only	18	147

== German newspapers in the Czech Republic ==
- Landeszeitung der Deutschen in Böhmen, Mähren und Schlesien (bi-weekly)
- Prager Zeitung

== Defunct newspapers of the Czech Republic ==
- Brno Noppeisen, bilingual Czech-German newspaper (1872–1873)
- České slovo (1945–1996)
- Ostrauer Volksblatt, German-language social democrat newspaper, later a communist newspaper (1912–1922)
- Prague Business Journal, English-language journal (1996–2003)
- The Prague Post, English-language newspaper, printed 1991–2013
- Munkás, Hungarian-language Communist newspaper

== See also ==
- List of magazines in the Czech Republic
