= Andrej Poleščuk =

Mgr. Andrej Poleščuk
- Born: 1993 (age 32–33)

Mgr. Andrej Poleščuk is a Czech lawyer and activist, a native of Belarus, a well-known figure on Czech Twitter, and an analyst for the association Evropské hodnoty (European Values). He is devoted to the issues of Eastern Europe, the EU, and the post-Soviet space.

On Twitter, he regularly informs about the events in Ukraine and the Russian-Ukrainian conflict, and since the invasion, in February 2022 he writes his summaries practically every day. He dealt with the Ukrainian situation earlier in the post-Euromaidan era.

As a volunteer, he actively organizes fundraising for Ukraine and has been decorated for this in Ukraine.

== Life ==
Andrej Poleščuk is originally from Belarus; he was born in 1993 and has been living in the Czech Republic with his family since August 2003. He has been a Czech citizen since 2014. He is studying law and jurisprudence at the Faculty of Law of Palacký University in Olomouc. He photographs Sudeten panoramas.

As a volunteer, he organizes collections for Ukraine. In December 2022 he visited Ukraine in person, including Bakhmut in the Donbas region. For his work he was decorated with an award intended for volunteers.

== Political action ==
In 2015, he was member of Pirate party. In 2017, he was a supporter of the Svobodní political party. From 2019 is registered supporter of the STAN party.

In an interview for Reflex magazine, he admitted that he chose a party and aggregates Ukrainian propaganda in his posts. He criticized Amnesty International for its August 2022 report on Ukraine.

== Twitter activity ==
His Twitter account @andrewofpolesia was followed by over 80,000 people in 2022 with a total reach of contributions, including sharing, of up to 400,000 people. Each daily Twitter thread begins with the "good news" that Ukraine has survived another day and the "bad news" that Vladimir Putin is still alive.

He publishes, among other things, comments about the killed Russian soldiers in style: "He was and is no longer. Congratulations." He does his "war reporting" in his spare time.
