= Germans in the Czech Republic =

Ethnic group in the Czech Republic

German citizens in the Czech Republic (recent history)
Year	Pop.	±%
1994	4,195	—
2000	4,968	+18.4%
2005	7,187	+44.7%
2010	13,871	+93.0%
2015	20,464	+47.5%
2018	21,267	+3.9%
2020	20,861	−1.9%
2021	14,792	−29.1%
2022	14,032	−5.1%

There are various communities of Germans in the Czech Republic or Germans in Czechia (Czech: Německá menšina v Česku, German: Deutsche Minderheit in Tschechien, Deutsche in Tschechien, Deutschböhmen (historical)). After the Czech Republic joined the European Union in the 2004 enlargement and was incorporated into the Schengen Area, migration between the two countries became relatively unrestricted. Both countries share a land border of 815 kilometers (506 mi).

== History ==
German Bohemians (German: Deutschböhmen und Deutschmährer, Czech: čeští Němci a moravští Němci, i.e. German Bohemians and German Moravians), later known as Sudeten Germans (German: Sudetendeutsche, Czech: sudetští Němci), were ethnic Germans living in the Czech lands of the Bohemian Crown, which later became an integral part of Czechoslovakia. Before 1945, over three million German Bohemians constituted about 23% of the population of the whole country and about 29.5% of the population of Bohemia and Moravia.

There have been ethnic Germans living in the Bohemian crown lands since the Middle Ages. In the late 12th and in the 13th century the Přemyslid rulers promoted the colonisation of certain areas of their lands by German settlers from the adjacent lands of Bavaria, Franconia, Upper Saxony and Austria during the Ostsiedlung migration. Under Austrian rule, much of what is now modern day Czech Republic was administered from Vienna, which promoted an influx of German settlers into the 19th century.

After the revolutions of 1848 and the rise of ethnic nationalism, nervousness about ethnic tensions in Austria-Hungary resulted in a prevailing equality between Czechs and German Bohemians. Each ethnicity tried to retain, in regions in which it was the majority, sovereignty over its own affairs. Czechs and Germans generally maintained separate schools, churches and public institutions. Nevertheless, despite the separation, Germans often understood some Czech, and Czechs often spoke some German. Cities like Prague, however, saw more mixing between the ethnicities and also had large populations of Jews; Germans living with Czechs fluently spoke Czech and code-switched between German and Czech when talking to Czechs and other Germans. Jews in Bohemia often spoke German and sometimes Yiddish.

The end of World War One brought about the partition of the multiethnic Austria-Hungary into its historical components, one of them, the Bohemian Kingdom, forming the west of the newly created Czechoslovakia. Czech politicians insisted on the traditional boundaries of the Bohemian Crown according to the principle of uti possidetis juris. The new Czech state would thus have defensible mountain boundaries with Germany, but the highly industrialised settlement areas of three million Germans would now be separated from Austria and come under Czech control. Many Sudeten Germans were opposed to their inclusion into the new Czech State. After the Czechoslovak Republic was proclaimed on 28 October 1918, the German Bohemians, claiming the right to self-determination according to the tenth of US President Woodrow Wilson’s Fourteen Points, demanded that their homeland areas remain with Austria, which by then had been reduced to the Republic of German Austria. The German Bohemians relied mostly on peaceful opposition to the occupation of their homeland by the Czech military, which started on 31 October 1918 and was completed on 28 January 1919. Fighting took place sporadically, resulting in the deaths of a few dozen Germans and Czechs.

On 13 March 1938, the Third Reich annexed Austria during the Anschluss. Sudeten Germans reacted with fear to the news of Austrian annexation, and the moderate wing of SdP grew in strength. Hitherto pro-Henlein German newspaper Bohemia denounced the SdP leader, arguing that his call for Sudeten Anschluss goes against the wish of his voters and supporters: "His present call to irredentism saddles the Sudeten Germans with all the consequences of treason to the State; for such a challenge the electors gave him neither their votes nor their mandate". On 22 March, the German Agrarian Party, led by Gustav Hacker, merged with the SdP. German Christian Socialists in Czechoslovakia suspended their activities on 24 March; their deputies and senators entered the SdP parliamentary club. However, the majority of Sudeten Germans did not support annexation into Germany. Contemporary reports of The Times found that there was a "large number of Sudetenlanders who actively opposed annexation", and that the pro-German policy was challenged by the moderates within the SdP as well; according to Wickham Steed, over 50 % of Henleinists favoured greater autonomy within Czechoslovakia over joining Germany. P. E. Caquet argues that in case of a fair plebiscite, a majority of the Sudetenland population would have voted to remain in Czechoslovakia. The municipal elections of May 1938 were marred with voter intimidation and street fighting - officially the SdP won about 90 percent of the Sudeten vote, but about a third of Sudeten Germans were prevented from casting a free vote.

However, after the annexation of Czechoslovakia by Nazi Germany, many Czech Germans joined the Nazi Germany's expansionism. As a result, the Czech Government in Exile as well as the Allied Powers agreed to the Expulsion of Germans from Czechoslovakia which resulted in the deportation of nearly 2.4 million Sudeten Germans into what is now modern Germany.

As of 2025, the Czech government has committed itself to implement measures to protect the German language in the Cheb District, Karlovy Vary Region, Sokolov District, Liberec District, Ústí nad Labem District, Český Krumlov District, Opava District, and the Svitavy District. According to these measures, kindergartens and schools are to be made bilingual.

== Statistics ==
In the 2001 census, 39,106 Czech citizens, or around 0.4% of the Czech Republic's total population, declared German ethnicity. In 2011 the census methodology changed and it was newly possible to declare multiple ethnicities or none at all: 25% of the citizens chose the option of not declaring ethnicity. In this census 18,658 citizens declared German as their sole ethnicity, while another 6,563 in combination with another ethnicity. According to regional statistics the largest number of citizens with German ethnicity is 4,431 in Karlovy Vary Region (1.5% of total population in this region). On district level the largest share is in Sokolov District (2.3%) followed by Karlovy Vary District (1.2%), both in Karlovy Vary Region. Today's Germans in the Czech republic form a small minority, remaining after the expulsion of the Sudeten Germans who had formed a majority in several areas of Czechoslovakia.

The following municipalities had ethnic Germans at over 6% of the population in 2011:

- Horská Kvilda/Innergefild (Klatovy District) - 9.72%
- Měděnec/Kupferberg (Chomutov District) - 9.49%
- Kryštofovy Hamry/Christophhammer (Chomutov District) - 8.64%
- Mikulov/Niklasberg (Teplice District) - 7.80%
- Tatrovice/Dotterwies (Sokolov District) - 7.74%
- Abertamy/Abertham (Karlovy Vary District) - 7.42%
- Horní Blatná/Bergstadt Platten (Karlovy Vary District) - 7.38%
- Pernink/Bärringen (Karlovy Vary District) - 6.37%
- Stříbrná/Silberbach (Sokolov District) - 6.22%
- Josefov/Josefsdorf (Sokolov District) - 6.14%
- Vejprty/Weipert (Chomutov District) - 6.07%

Government statistics also showed 21,478 German citizens living in the CR as of December 31, 2019, with largest number of these in Ústí nad Labem Region (7,525) and Prague (4,146).

== Education ==
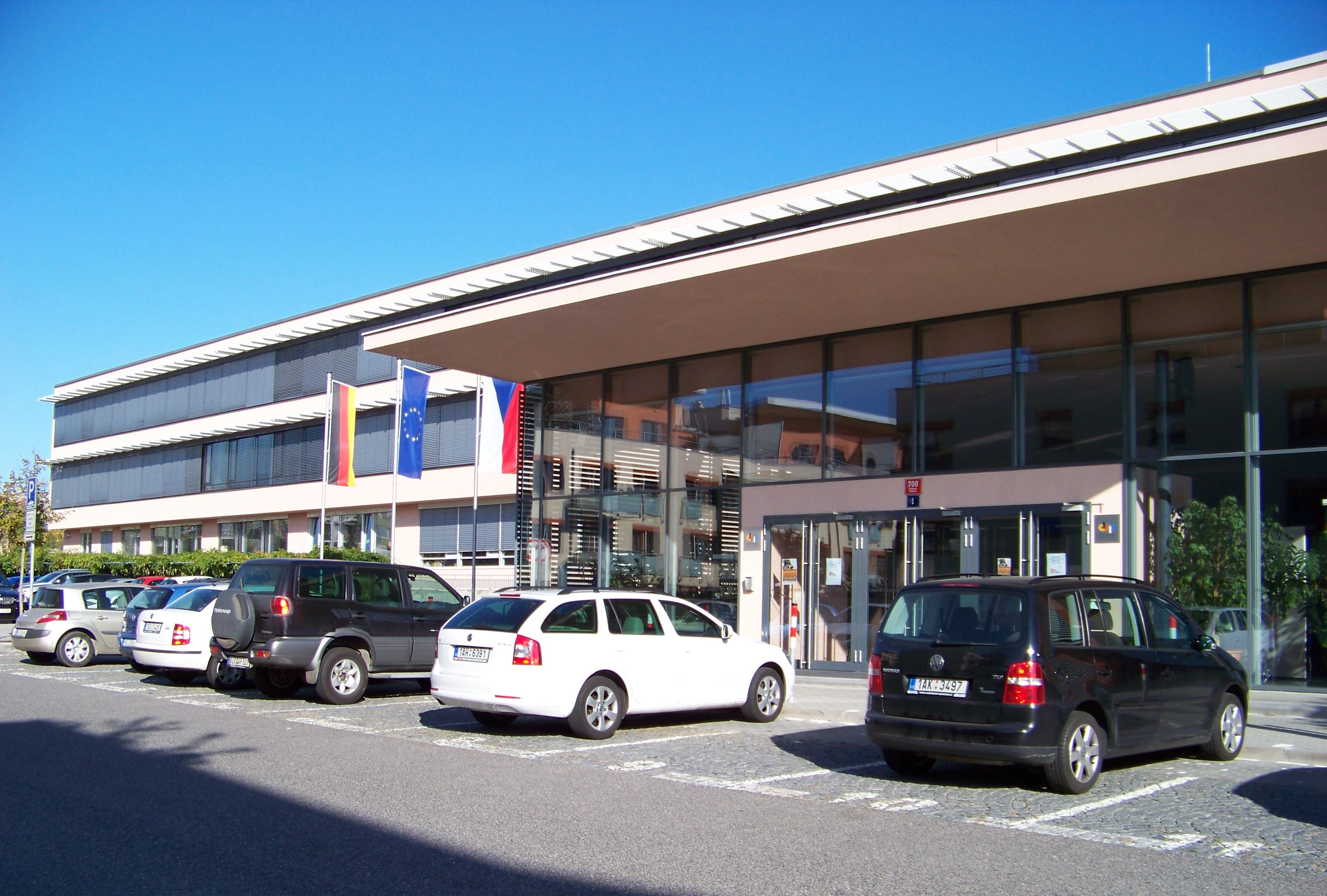
Deutsche Schule Prag

The Deutsche Schule Prag is a German international school in Prague.

== Media ==
- Landeszeitung der Deutschen in Böhmen, Mähren und Schlesien
- Prager Zeitung

== Notable people ==
- Hirsch Bär, rabbi and philosopher
- Hermann Edler von Zeissl, dermatologist
- Oswald Ottendorfer, journalist
- Bruno Adler, art historian and writer
- Gertrud Schoenberg, opera librettist
- Emilie Schindler, humanitarian
- Oskar Schindler, industrialist and humanitarian
- Walter Becher, politician
- Heidi Lück, politician
- Marie Christine von Reibnitz, member of the British royal family
- Robert Reichel, professional ice hockey player
- Jan Koller, former professional footballer
- Patrik Berger, former professional footballer
- Vladimir Eminger, professional ice hockey player
- David Kämpf, professional ice hockey player
- Patrik Schick, professional footballer

== See also ==
- Czech Republic–Germany relations
- Sudeten Germans
- Expulsion of Germans from Czechoslovakia
- Czechs in Germany
