= Denní Telegraf =

- Type: Daily newspaper
- Owner: N Press
- Editor: Václav Musílek
- Founded: 1994
- Ceased publication: 1997
- Political alignment: Right-wing
- Headquarters: Prague

Denní Telegraf was a newspaper based in the Czech Republic. It was published from 1994 to 1997. It served as a newspaper of the Civic Democratic Party. It was published by Nový Telegraf, s.r.o.

== History ==
Denní Telegraf was founded in 1994 as a newspaper of the Civic Democratic Party. It has never been successful and Denní Telegraf ceased to exist in 1997.

== See also ==
- List of newspapers in the Czech Republic
