= E15 (newspaper) =

Czech newspaper

e15
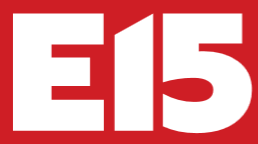
- Type: Daily newspaper
- Format: Compact
- Owner: Czech Media Invest
- Publisher: Czech News Center
- Editor-in-chief: Nikita Poljakov
- Founded: 19 November 2007; 18 years ago
- Language: Czech
- Headquarters: náměstí Marie Schmolkové 3493/1, Prague 10
- Country: Czech Republic
- ISSN: 1803-4543
- Website: www.e15.cz

e15 is a national daily newspaper published in the Czech Republic. Focused on business and the economy, the newspaper was founded in 2007. It was initially published by Mladá fronta until being bought by Czech Media Invest in April 2016.

== Circulation and distribution ==
Founded in 2007, e15 was initially a free newspaper, distributed mainly to office buildings in Prague and the Central Bohemian Region. Distribution extended to Brno and Ostrava, the Czech Republic's next two biggest cities by population, in 2009. e15 appeared for the first time in data from the ABC ČR in January 2013, when circulation was 46,786. Of those, an average of 651 were sold, at a price of 10 Czech koruna. Circulation in 2015 was reported to be 53,485 copies.

From 2020, the free distribution model was changed; although the newspaper continued to be offered for free in cafes or on trains, it introduced a daily charge for the electronic PDF format. At the same time, physical distribution was made available at the Geco tobacconist chain. In 2024 the printed version was discontinued, with the title moving to online-only publishing.

== Editors-in-chief ==
Tomáš Skřivánek was the first editor-in-chief of e15, serving from the autumn of 2007 until stepping away from day-to-day operations in June 2014. Having worked at e15 since its foundation, and having served as deputy editor-in-chief from 2010, Tereza Zavadilová was appointed editor-in-chief in July 2014, remaining in her role until announcing her resignation in October 2020. On 1 February 2021 she was replaced by Nikita Poljakov, who joined from Hospodářské noviny.

== See also ==
- List of newspapers in the Czech Republic
