= France Dimanche =

French weekly celebrity news magazine

- Categories: News magazine
- Frequency: Weekly
- Publisher: Czech Media Invest
- Total circulation: 575,000 (2007)
- Founded: 1946; 80 years ago
- Country: France
- Based in: Paris
- Language: French
- Website: Official website
- ISSN: 0015-9549

France Dimanche (English: France Sunday) is a French weekly celebrity news magazine published by Czech Media Invest with a circulation of about 150.00 copies. Similar to British tabloids, but with a weekly circulation, it covers celebrity gossip and scandals since 1946.

== History ==
France Dimanche was established in 1946, at the end of World War II with the aim of providing entertainment for the masses. It publishes every Sunday and uses colourful pictures and headlines providing details on the lives of celebrities such as their health, financial status and personal relationships. Its writers work under pseudonyms. General news and literary content are not covered extensively.

The demographics of its readers mainly include older people and women aged between 35 and 50. Along with Ici Paris, France-Soir and Paris-Match it is considered part of the presse de sensation, i.e. the sensationalist media. It is also considered a part of the presse indiscrète, the French equivalent of the tabloid press. François Truffaut was a writer for the magazine who also worked as a photographer for the publication.

In 2010, France Dimanche published an article which it said to be an interview of the deaceased Claude François by a medium.

In 2019, Hachette sold France Dimanche and other magazines to Czech Media Invest, parent of Czech News Center.

== Circulation ==
In 1949 the circulation of France Dimanche was 450,000 copies. Its circulation in the mid-1990s was about 650,000 copies. In 2001 the magazine had a circulation of 566,000 copies. In 2004 the magazines sold 537,011 copies. Its circulation was 575,000 copies in 2007.

== Star coverage ==
In 1956 the news magazine carried pictures of Brigitte Bardot embracing affectionately with Roger Vadim under the headline "Et pourtant si! Il divorcent!" (And yet it's true, the divorce is on!). A 1960s article under the headline "La Défaite des mauvaises femmes" (The downfall of the bad women) chronicles the separations of Maria Kallas, Eva Bartok and Brenda Lee from the "men they seduced", as the magazine claimed at the time. Another article of the same decade carries the headline "Sooner or later Love is defeated by Scandal". During that era the magazine enumerated the love affairs of Brigitte Bardot, all the while keeping moralising criticism of the star to a minimum.

== Seizure ==
In 1949, copies of the news magazine were seized during the weekend in France, prior to their distribution, because they were carrying pictures of Princess Margaret and her entourage, during her vacation at the island of Capri, which were deemed to be an insult. The seizure of the papers occurred under orders of Police inspector Finault of the Paris prefecture who claimed that the pictures "would have angered the King of a great and friendly country".

One of the pictures in contention showed the back of a nude female sitting on the rocks. The news magazine had announced at the time that the identity of the nude female in that picture could not be determined. Another picture showed the princess boarding a boat but the bathing suit could not be discerned.

The seizure was made under a law covering "insults to the head of a foreign state". The paper issued a statement protesting "such an attack on the Liberty of the Press. Max Corre, general manager of France Dimanche at the time, had stated that the seizure was illegal and that he was preparing legal action. Corre also said that the pictures had also been published in Italy and that a modified edition of France Dimanche would be available on Tuesday.

The French Ministry of External Affairs had said at the time that it ordered the police to seize the papers at the request of the British Embassy. In turn, a spokesman of the British Embassy denied that the prefect of police had acted pursuant to a complaint launched by then British ambassador to France Sir Oliver Harvey.

The French press union issued a statement condemning the "publication in a weekly newspaper of photographs claiming to represent a distinguished personality belonging to the family of the chief of state of a friendly nation". The union did not specify France Dimanche by name so it was nor clear if the statement referred to it or Samedi Soir which had also published the pictures at the time.

The newspaper Ce Matin called the photographer "irresponsible" and commented that the pictures would cause a scandal in Britain, "not because they showed the splendid figure of the young princess, but because T. C. Harvey, the Queen's private secretary, was wearing a hat while leading the Princess", an action which the newspaper called "a little off-hand".

== Lawsuits ==
The paper was sued in 1955 by Marlene Dietrich for publishing personal details about her.

In 1965, Gérard Philipe sued the magazine for publishing an article about his son's illness.
