= Editis =

French publishing company

- Parent company: Czech Media Invest
- Founded: 20 December 2002
- Country of origin: France
- Headquarters location: Paris
- Key people: José Manuel Lara (chairman)
- Publication types: Books
- Revenue: ▲€856 million Euros (2021)
- No. of employees: 2600 (as of 2010)
- Official website: www.editis.com

Editis is a French group of publishing companies, subsidiary of Czech Media Invest. It is the second-largest French publishing group, after Hachette Livre.

In June 2023, after acquiring a majority stake in Hachette's parent company, the Lagardère Group, Vivendi chose to keep Hachette, while selling Editis to Czech Media Invest, which is owned by Czech billionaire Daniel Křetínský. The sale was finalised that November in the same year.

== History ==
Editis was created on 20 December 2002 after Vivendi sold Vivendi Universal Publishing to Natexis Banques Populaires subsidiary Investima 10 (a financial ad hoc structure that was holding onto VUP on behalf of Lagardère Group while antitrust approval was pending) and renamed it VUP-Investima 10. This company got its current name on 14 October 2003 and throughout 2004, 40% of Editis' assets went to Lagardère while 60% went to financial investment group Wendel (which also acquired the company itself).

In May 2008, Editis integrated with the Planeta Group, the main Spanish-speaking publisher. In January 2019, Vivendi reacquired Editis from Planeta for €900m.

In November 2023, Czech Media Invest acquired Editis from Vivendi for €653m. The total amount of funds received by Vivendi was €654 million including the reimbursement of Editis's debt to Vivendi at closing.

== Group members ==
As of 2009 the main subsidiaries were:

- Bordas
- CLE International
- Comptoir du Livre
- DNL
- Éditions First
- First Interactive
- Interforum
- La Découverte, formerly Éditions Maspero
- Le Cherche Midi éditeur
- Dictionnaires Le Robert
- Éditions Nathan
- Syros (French publishing house).
- Éditions de l'Atelier
- Éditions Perrin
- Place des éditeurs
- Acropole
- Éditions Belfond
- En Voyage Editions
- Hors Collection
- Le pré aux clercs
- Lonely Planet France
- Omnibus
- Presses de la Cité
- Solar
- Plon
- Presses de la Renaissance
- Retz
- Éditions Robert Laffont - NiL Éditions - Éditions Julliard - Seghers
- SEJER
- SOGEDIF
- 10/18, Fleuve noir, Langues Pour Tous, Pocket, Pocket Jeunesse
- XO éditions
- Oh! Editions
- Éditions Gründ
- Paraschool
