= Reflex (magazine) =

Czech weekly magazine

- Frequency: Weekly
- Publisher: Czech News Center
- Total circulation: 64,008 (2011)
- First issue: 1990; 36 years ago
- Country: Czech Republic
- Based in: Prague
- Language: Czech
- Website: reflex.cz
- ISSN: 0862-6634

Reflex is a Czech weekly magazine focusing on political, social and cultural topics. It was founded in 1990 and is currently owned by company Czech News Center. It is one of the Czech Republic's most controversial and widely read social-political magazines; its print circulation of 60,000 copies (as of January, 2010) reaches approximately 270,000 readers. Polls conducted by the Czech Publishers Association (Unie vydavatelů) in 2005, 2006, 2007 and 2008 placed Reflex first in its category.

== Background ==
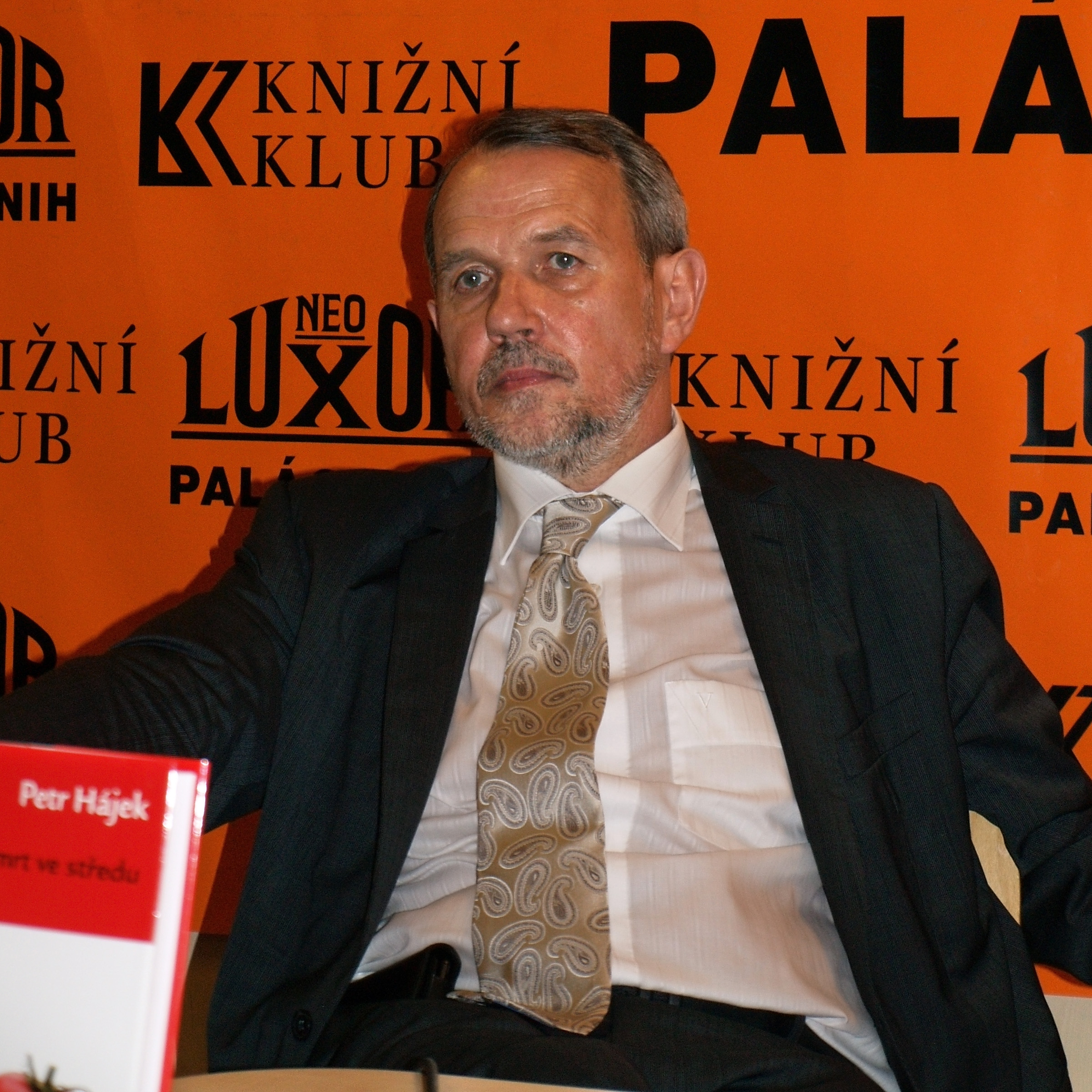
Petr Hájek, founder of Reflex.

Reflex was founded in 1990 following the Velvet Revolution in Czechoslovakia. Its first editor-in-chief, Petr Hájek and a group of promising, like-minded Czech journalists established its combination of political news journal and life style magazine. The result was an original and distinctively Czech approach to current affairs. Hájek's ideas and format were vindicated as Reflex gradually created its own niche within an expanding and increasingly competitive market for Czech periodicals. In 1993 Hájek won the disapproval of some of his colleagues when he sold Reflex to the Swiss corporation Ringier without prior consultation: Josef Klíma, a co-founder of Reflex and a prominent Czech investigative journalist, remembers Hájek as "the greatest disappointment in my life" Hájek left to work as a media consultant in marketing and advertising. From 2003 - 2008 he was campaigner and spokesman for his long-standing political ally, Czech President Václav Klaus.

In 1995, Ringier appointed Petr Bílek as Reflex' editor-in-chief. During Bilek's 13 year tenure the magazine's style and orientation shifted profoundly. According to him, Reflex's position in the early 1990s was "idyllic, due to non-existent competition". Its early editions ran to around 200,000 copies; Reflex and a single significant competitor, Respekt, dominated the free media market. According to Bílek, early Reflex journalism was founded on a "very uncompromising", critical approach to Czechoslovakia's communist past and the surviving remnants of communist attitudes and institutions. As Czech society changed, Reflex kept pace under Bilek, whose editorial policy shifted focus away from the past towards contemporary political events and social changes but its earlier "idyllic" position was eroded by an increasingly competitive, diversified market. Part of its earlier readership was apparently lost to a revamped and modernised Respekt but it retained a substantial share of the market and remains popular with readers and advertisers: independent estimates found a likely target readership of approximately 270,000 for its January 2010 print circulation of 60,000 copies, making it the most successful advertising vehicle of 2010 among Czech political-social magazines. In 2008, Bílek stepped down. He was replaced by Pavel Šafr, former editor-in-chief of the newspapers Mladá fronta DNES and Lidové noviny: from 2010, Bílek served Reflex as an external editor. In 2010, the NY Times described Reflex as one of the leading weekly periodicals in the Czech Republic.

== Style ==
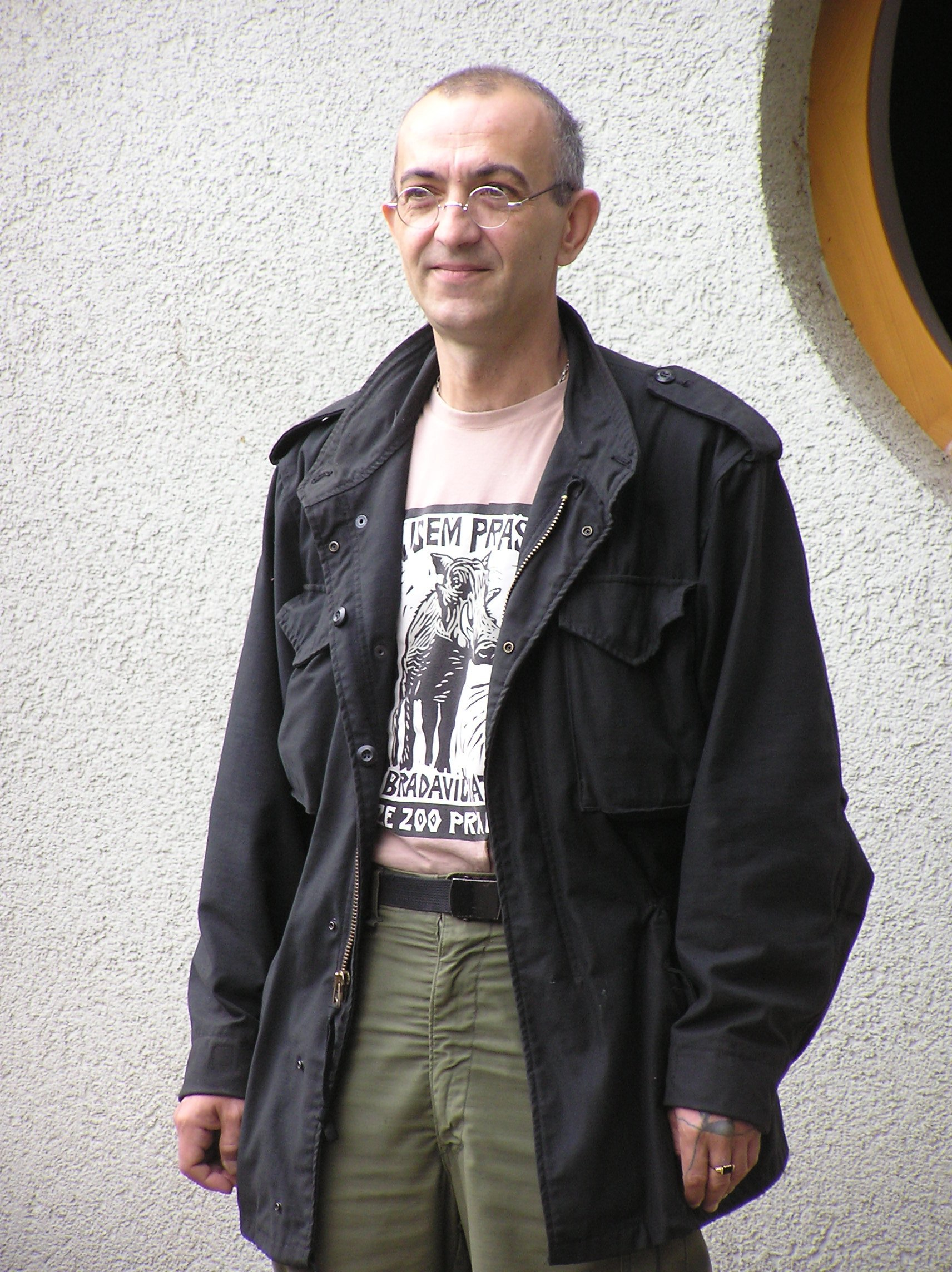
Jiří X. Doležal

Reflex has been described as conservative and anti-leftist; its 20th anniversary issue included a manifesto against left-wing ideology and Czech Social Democratic Party politics. On the website Britské listy, Czech media expert Jan Čulík positions it between tabloid commercialism and quality journalism. Jiří Pehe describes it as popular but untrustworthy, a right-leaning and rather pro-Civic Democratic Party forum.

=== Content and controversy ===
Reflex regularly covers controversial political and social issues in a controversial manner. Regular Reflex contributor Jiří X. Doležal campaigned for the decriminalization of small growers and users of cannabis, and organised an annual contest through the magazine. A Reflex Cannabis Cup was awarded for the best reader's photos of home grown cannabis. In 2010, the Czech legislature adopted more tolerant cannabis laws; Doležal announced the end of the contest: "...in future, the contest should be organized by the cannabis business, not by a social magazine". Some of magazine's covers have made controversial suggestions about prominent figures in Czech public life and politics.

In 2001, Zelený Raoul, a Reflex satirical comic strip illustrated by Štěpán Mareš, showed the former Social-democratic minister Karel Březina in a naked sexual embrace with his wife, the writer Bára Nesvadbová. Březina sued, and won damages and a public apology.

=== AAA Auto Praha ===
In 2002, Reflex reported alleged malpractice by AAA Auto Praha, a major Czech used car dealership. Copies of the magazine sold unusually fast: this led to speculation in the major national media (Czech Television, Blesk, and Mladá fronta DNES) that the company's management had tried to buy the entire print run to avoid public exposure. Anthony James Denny, general manager of the company, denied all the allegations. Reflex reprinted the original report in its next issue.

=== Jiří Paroubek ===
The magazine cover with images of the Chairman of the Czech Social Democratic Party (ČSSD) Jiří Paroubek and his wife in simulation of a well-known 1980 photo of Yoko Ono and John Lennon. The title of the magazine says: Pre-election Reality Show. Public Love. Jiří Paroubek Loving and Fighting.

Jiří Paroubek, former Czech Prime Minister and current Chairman of the Czech Social Democratic Party (ČSSD), was involved in a lawsuit against Reflex. In 2009, the magazine published a report describing Paroubek's election campaign as an attempt to employ his private life as a part of political marketing. According to Reflex, the carefree marriage and the proliferating family were the main trump cards in the Paroubek's election campaign, instead of political ideas. Additionally, Reflex published an article comparing the developing pregnancy of Paroubek's wife (Petra Paroubková) with political developments in the Czech Republic. The magazine cover posed images of Paroubek and his wife in simulation of a well-known 1980 photo of Yoko Ono and John Lennon. According to Paroubek, the article so seriously disturbed his pregnant wife that she had to be hospitalized. Petra Paroubková sued Reflex in her own right in 2009, when she and her husband were intimately depicted in the Zelený Raoul comic strip. Paroubková labelled the series as "disgusting and insulting porn comics". Reflex refused to apologize, stating that "pornography is about sex, but we're talking about serious political topics". In 2009, the courts rejected Paroubková's description of the comic as pornographic, and rejected her case.

=== David Rath ===
In February, 2009, Reflex published an article called "Arbeit Macht Rath", containing criticism of a former minister of health for the Czech Republic and current (2010) governor of Central Bohemian region, David Rath, by some of his Social Democratic Party colleagues. The issue cover caricatured Rath as Adolf Hitler and the article title referred to Rath's statement to the newspaper Lidové noviny: "Hitler solved the crisis by starting armament, by which he gave people jobs and fired up the economy. He won the election with that. Later that resulted in a war. But liberal economists tend to forget that." In August 2009, Rath filed a lawsuit against Reflex but lost the case. The court considered the caricature neither inappropriate nor uncivil: judge Tomáš Novosad found it justified by Rath's published statement. The editor-in-chief of Reflex, Pavel Šafr, wrote: "we have depicted Mr. Rath as a combination of a clown and a dictator, as a cross-breed of Adolf Hitler and Charlie Chaplin."

=== Pavel Bém ===
Pavel Bém, Mayor of Prague and member of the Civic Democratic Party was subject of a Reflex article on alleged corruption within Prague's municipal government. The magazine's cover showed Bém with a pig's snout and the article was illustrated with a photomontage of him with a rolled banknote and a line of white powder on a table. Bém planned to sue Reflex, but did not. Instead, he sent Reflex a letter protesting his own innocence and their use of a single, unreliable source. Reflex published his letter in its 21 January 2010 issue.

== Contributors ==
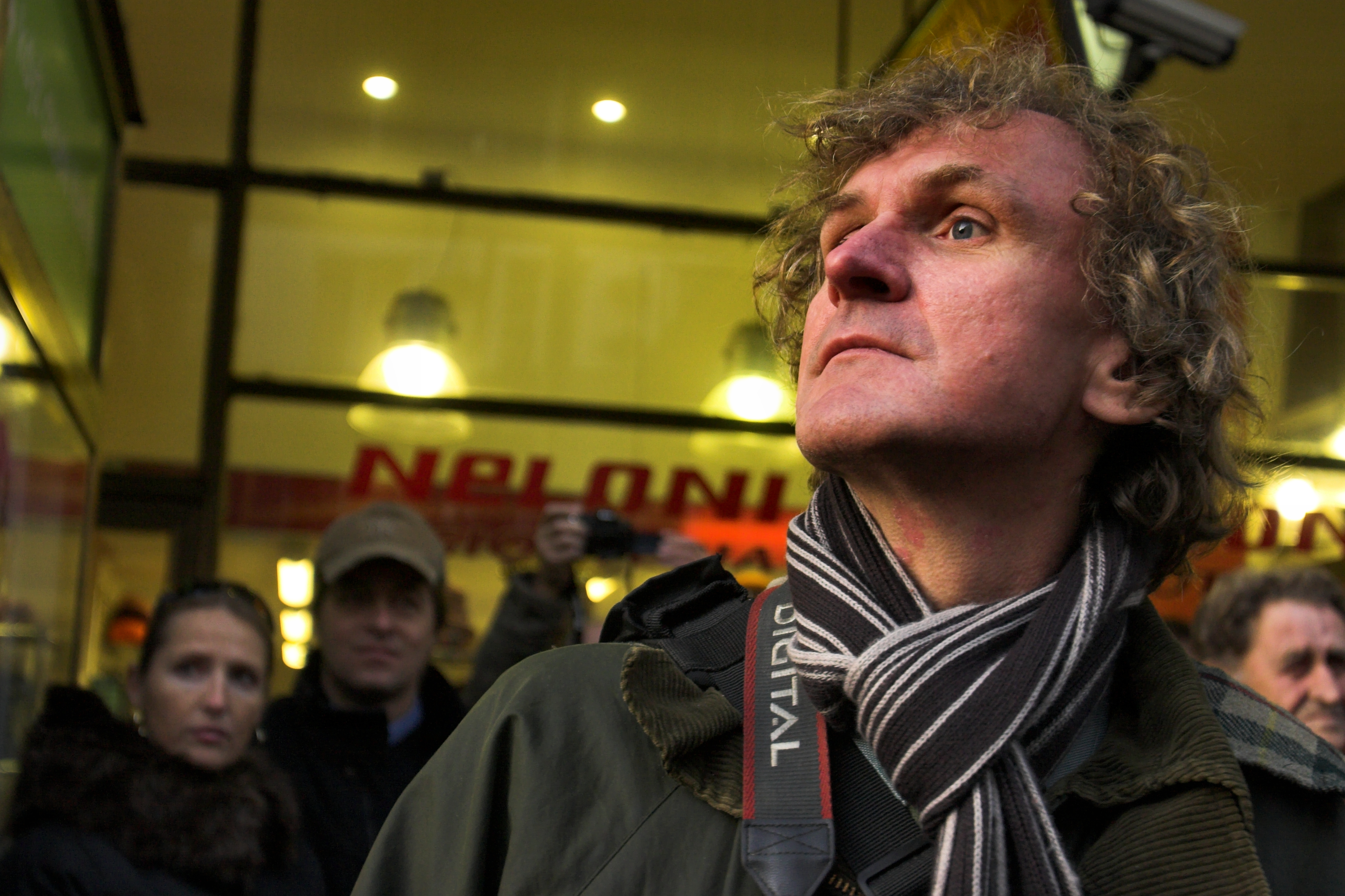
Jan Šibík, former main photographer of Reflex.

- Radek Bajgar - former editor-in-chief
- Jiří X. Doležal - former reporter
- Tomáš Feřtek
- Pavlína Wolfová
- Tomáš Baldýnský
- Miloš Čermák
- Jan Potůček
- Lucie Tomanová
- Andrej Halada
- Veronika Bednářová
- Bohumil Pečinka
- Jan Šibík - main photographer
- Petr Bílek - former editor-in-chief
- Pavel Šafr - former editor-in-chief

== See also ==
- List of magazines in the Czech Republic
