= Dispersal of ownership =

Media ownership standpoint

Dispersal of ownership (also ownership dispersal, dispersed media ownership) is a standpoint that opposes concentration of media ownership and mergers of media conglomerates. This position generally advocates smaller and local ownership of media as a way to realize journalistic values and inclusive media public sphere in society.

== Background ==
Media ownership concentration is a state that fewer individuals or organizations control many and various media entities. For decades, this consolidation of media ownership has been progressive and also controversial in the United States. A recent study shows that many media industries in many areas and countries are highly concentrated and dominated by a very small number of firms. Such media conglomerates own large numbers of companies in various media domains, such as television, radio, publishing, movies, and the Internet. For example, the Walt Disney Company, the largest media conglomerate in the United States in terms of revenue, owns the ABC television network, cable channels (for example, ESPN, Disney Channels Worldwide, and ABC Family), and eight television stations. Moreover, they have radio stations such as ESPN Radio, and publishers like Marvel Comics.

One of the most prominent critics on this issue, Robert W. McChesney, points out that these media conglomerates can have a strong and harmful impact on media culture. According to him, media giants are most likely to be politically conservative, because they usually take advantage of the current social structure, and “any upheaval in property or social relations, particularly to the extent that it reduces the power of business, is not in their interest”. He warns possible lack of views that can oppose current societal structure.

Other criticism comes from the aspects of mass media as business activities. U.S. Federal Communications Commission (FCC) Commissioner, Michael J. Copps criticize concentrating and highly commercializing media ownership by mentioning that “when TV and radio stations are not longer required by law to serve their local communities and are owned by huge national corporations, viewers and listeners have become the products that broadcasters sell to advertisers.”

== Rationale for the standpoint ==
In 2003, then FCC Chairman Michael K. Powell pushed to relax the FCC's long-standing rules on media concentration, which regulate the market share of cable networks in a market, the number of television stations owned by national networks, and newspaper-TV cross ownership. Powell planned to allow a single company to own up to three television stations, eight radio stations, a local newspaper, a monopolized cable provider and an internet service provider in a single market. He insisted that although FCC had a historic role to protect the diversity of news and information, the recent circumstances surrounding newspaper publishing and television industries forced them to form centralized institutions, for their own survival.

C. Edwin Baker, the Nicholas F. Gallicchio Professor of Law and Communication at the University of Pennsylvania Law School, proposes rationale for the standpoint of media owner dispersal, in challenging this FCC's attempts of deregulating media ownership restrictions.

=== Democratic distributive value ===
This normative value is based on the egalitarian premise of democracy, the "One man, one vote" requirement. Baker advocates that this premise should be applied to voice in the public sphere, since voice influences and forms public opinion, more than vote does. In other words, voice can form public opinion and it can also provide the possibility of public deliberation. Consequently, this view leads to discussion that dispersal of media power should be maximized because the media is regarded as the central institution of domestic public sphere. Therefore, according to this value, concentration of media ownership does essentially harm basic principle of democratic society. These are the backbones of the recommendation for a maximization of dispersed media power, which is ultimately represented by the ownership.

Regarding this egalitarian "equal voice" goal, Baker noted three caveats.

==== Not everyone has the same ability or the same desire to engage in public communication ====
The democratic distribution value that maximizes dispersal of media power must not overwhelm the competing value of allowing effective speakers to accumulate large audiences. However, Baker notes, this does not mean that a single man can own multiple media outlets and entities. It only suggests that effective speakers are allowed to appeal to and obtain a great size of audiences. This “equal voice” goal should be understood as individual's guaranteed media experience, where they freely express themselves and see themselves and their views are included in public discourse.

==== Increasing media ownership dispersal requires policy measures ====
Dispersed media ownership contributes to equalizing the distribution of media power. Still, other policy measures will be needed because people who have the similar values, experiences, and perspectives tend to control media entities. Government should take care of these demographic commonalities and try to include different demographic groups in public discourse.

==== Some media usefully aim to embody diverse discourses ====
Similar to the second point above, even legal efforts are also required to assure that different voices are represented in media entities.

=== Democratic safeguard value ===
This view argues that wide dispersed media ownership function work as safeguard for democratic society. Baker suggests four examples on how this dispersed media ownership contributes to sound democratic society.

==== Avoid the danger of demagogic power ====
Media conglomerates influence public opinion and may try to control influence over the public sphere. Dispersed ownership can prevent such abuse of power --- the "Berlusconi effect.". The existence of the consolidated media power within the public sphere is a real danger. Democratic society cannot accept this risk of power abuse. Many countries have experienced abuse of the concentrated power implicit in conglomerate media ownership. In fact, in past, German media conglomerate allowed and even supported the rise of Hitler.

==== Increase the number of people with power as a watchdog ====
Simply, dispersal media ownership results in putting more people and organizations into being watchdogs of the society. More people and organizations work as a watchdog, broader range of perspectives and more different insights, which can detect possible problems, will be brought to the society. As a result, more malfeasance and incompetence of the powerful can be scrutinized under the dispersed media ownership structure. FCC also explained this aspect of diversified ownership in 1970 as follows:

A proper objective is the maximum diversity of ownership.... We are of the view that 60 different licensees are more desirable than 50, and even that 51 are more desirable than 50.... If a city has 60 frequencies available but they are licensed to only 50 different licensees, the number of sources for ideas is not maximized. It might be the 51st licensee that would become the communication channel for a solution to a severe local social crisis.

==== Reduce the risk of effective external corruption ====
A dispersed media structure increases the number of people who influence over potential corrupters.

==== Alleviate undermining journalistic integrity caused by the conflicts of interest ====
Media concentration worsens the problems of interest conflicts. Journalism is sometimes distorted by such conflicts of interest. In short, journalism is vulnerable to outside pressure. These journalistic distortions tend to occur with other media companies or multi-industry conglomerates for the promotion of other (commercial, financial, or political) interests.

For example:

- Commercial interests decide news. In November 1999, NBC affiliate stations did not regard ABC's popular quiz show, Who Wants To Be a Millionaire, as newsworthy. In contrast, ABC's affiliates mentioned the show in 80.2% of their local news programs.
- When The New York Times began an exposé series criticizing the pharmaceutical industry, pharmaceutical companies threatened the publisher by implying to withdraw all advertisements from medical magazines that the New York Times owned. The New York Times resisted the threats and continued the exposé series, but they resulted in selling the medical magazines consequently
- When Knight-Ridder's Detroit paper sought Attorney General Ed Meese's approval on a joint operating agreement with another Detroit paper, Knight-Ridder had to stop campaigns against Ed Meese in his another paper, The Miami Herald.
- U.S. President Richard Nixon tried to retaliate against The Washington Post by creating troubles in its broadcast license renewal.
- NBC, owned by General Electric, clearly has an incentive to support its owner's economic interests, for example, nuclear plant stations.
- An oil company, Atlantic Richfield, purchased a British broadsheet, The Observer, during the period when it was seeking North Sea oil leases, which received harsh media criticism.

Dispersal of ownership can reduce such conflicts.

=== Media quality value ===
Media conglomerates' primary focus is placed on the bottom line, sacrificing quality of journalistic reporting. According to Baker, executives of conglomerate, especially private and publicly traded companies, without stable management structure, such as family or in-group ownership, tend to value profits over journalistic values. It is understandable because these executives in those media giants are most likely to be required to maximize the profit rather than to serve their community by high standard reporting. These executives are rewarded (or fired) on the basis of their ability (or inability) to increase the bottom line. They often take some of identity from their achievements of profit-making. These bottom-line concerns are encouraged by day-to-day interactions, such as business trades, not with the people of a community that they are supposed to serve, but with other stakeholders and other executives who also value higher profits than journalism.

Two structural reasons can be suggested to explain why these executives and media owners are not only less inclined, but also less free to make the choice of sacrificing profits for journalism.

- An executive of a publicly traded company faces obligations and intense pressure to serve the bottom line.
- In merging other companies, whether or not the merger will be successful is only examined by the calculations of the property's potential future profits. This forces media companies to focus on producing profits to pay the debt created by the purchase. Therefore, media conglomerates purchasing other companies tend to emphasize the bottom line, rather than journalistic or cultural values of the property.

Contrarily, smaller, local owners who take aspects of identity from their contributions to their community and their journalistic outputs they produce; workers who take professional and journalistic pride in the quality of their reports; non-profit organizations whose goals are to serve their community tend to value journalism over financial profits.

Therefore, dispersal of ownership enhances quality of media contents.

== Criticism ==
Daniel Ho, an Assistant Professor of Law & Robert E. Paradise Faculty Fellow for Excellence in Teaching and Research at Stanford Law School and Kevin Quinn, an Associate Professor in Department of Government and Institute for Quantitative Science at Harvard University, criticize the claim that media consolidation reduces viewpoint diversity. They argue this “convergence hypothesis” is not empirically proven, but it has been recognized as “empirical bedrock” of FCC's regulation on media concentration. By adopting statistical techniques to previous five merger cases, they discuss that these media mergers, such as the merger of The New York Times and The Boston Globe, did not show any statistical correlation with reduction of viewpoint diversity on the media.

Responding to their point, Baker argues back that they mistakenly pay attention to the impacts of mergers on viewpoint diversity. Baker argues that source diversity should be focused instead.
