= Cross ownership =

Pattern of ownership of stock in business partners

Cross ownership is a method of reinforcing business relationships by owning stocks in the companies with which a given company does business. Heavy cross ownership is referred to as circular ownership.

In the US, "cross ownership" also refers to a type of investment in different mass-media properties in one market.

== Cross ownership of stock ==
Countries noted to have high levels of cross ownership include:

- Japan
- Germany

Examples of the positives of cross ownership:

- Closely ties each business to the economic destiny of its business partners
- Promotes a slow rate of economic change

Cross ownership of shares is criticized for:

- Stagnating the economy
- Wasting capital that could be used to improve productivity
- Expanding economic downturns by preventing reallocation of capital
- Lessening control of shareholders over corporate leadership.

A major factor in perpetuating cross-ownership of shares is a high capital gains tax rate. Companies have less incentive to sell cross-owned shares when taxes are high, as the tax liability reduces the net proceeds from the sale.

For example, a company owns $1000 of stock in another company that was originally purchased for $200. If the capital gains tax rate is 25% (as in Germany), the $800 profit ($1000 - $200) would result in a tax liability of $200 ($800 × 0.25). After paying the tax, the company would retain a net gain of $600 ($800 profit - $200 tax). However, the immediate tax expense may discourage the company from selling, as holding the stock defers the tax liability and preserves the full value of the assets on paper.

Long term cross ownership of shares combined with a high capital tax rate greatly increases periods of asset deflation both in time and in severity.

== Media cross ownership ==
Cross ownership also refers to a type of media ownership in which one type of communications (say a newspaper) owns or is the sister company of another type of medium (such as a radio or TV station). One example is The New York Times's former ownership of WQXR Radio, and the Chicago Tribune's similar relationship with WGN Radio (WGN-AM) and Television (WGN-TV).

To prevent one license holder from having too much local media ownership, the Federal Communications Commission generally does not allow cross ownership unless the license holder obtains a waiver. Examples include News Corporation and the Tribune Company, both in New York.

The mid-1970s cross-ownership guidelines grandfathered already-existing cross ownerships, such as Tribune-WGN, New York Times-WQXR and the New York Daily News ownership of WPIX Television and Radio.
