= Právo =

Czech daily newspaper

- Type: Daily newspaper
- Format: Broadsheet
- Publisher: Borgis
- Editor: Petr Šabata
- Founded: 1991; 35 years ago
- Political alignment: Centre-left, social democrat, pro-Social Democratic Party
- Headquarters: Prague
- Circulation: 112,000 (as of 2012)
- Website: pravo.cz

Právo (lit. 'Right') is a Czech-language daily newspaper published in Prague, Czech Republic.

== History and profile ==
Právo emerged in 1991 following the Velvet Revolution, when some editors of the daily Rudé právo founded a new company unaffiliated with the Czechoslovak Communist Party but taking advantage of the existing reader base. The paper is not directly linked to any political party, but is ideologically close to the Czech Social Democratic Party. It maintains a left-wing stance and tends to focus on social issues.

In 2019, Právo allowed the Chinese embassy to produce an eight-page paid supplement to the paper labelled as a "theme and commercial supplement". The articles featured exclusively positive coverage of China and were signed by the paper’s reporters.

Právo is published in Prague by Borgis, a stock company that issues only Právo and its supplements, owned for 91% by the paper's editor-in-chief, Zdeněk Porybný. The paper is published in broadsheet format.

On 18 July 2023, Porybný was replaced as editor-in-chief by his deputy Petr Šabata, former editor-in-chief of ČRo Plus.

== Circulation ==
The circulation of Právo was 205,000 copies in 2002, making it the third best selling newspaper in the country. In October 2003 the paper had a circulation of 189,583 copies and was again the third most read newspaper in the Czech Republic. In December 2004 the circulation of the paper was 189,583 copies.

The 2007 circulation of Právo was 164,157 copies. The circulation of the paper was 145,031 copies in 2008 and 138,476 copies in 2009. It was 128,404 copies in 2010 and 120,449 copies in 2011. Between April and September 2012 Právo had a circulation of 112,000 copies.

== See also ==
- List of newspapers in the Czech Republic
