= Deník =

Regional daily newspaper in the Czech Republic

- Type: Daily newspaper
- Format: Tabloid
- Founded: 2006
- Language: Czech
- Website: denik.cz

Deník is a regional daily newspaper in the Czech Republic.

== History ==
Originally owned by German publishing company Verlagsgruppe Passau (VGP), Deník has been owned by Penta Investments since 2015. VGP has a monopoly on the Czech regional press. In September 2006, regional newspapers across the Czech Republic were rebranded to Deník with a regional adjective appended, including Pražský deník (lit. 'Prague Daily Newspaper'). Apart from the Prague-based version, further 72 regional newspapers were branded as part of this launch.

The 2007 circulation of the paper was 328,319 copies, making it the second most read paper in the country. The circulation of Deník was 295,307 copies in 2008 and 247,987 copies in 2009. It was 224,122 copies in 2010 and 204,084 copies in 2011.

== See also ==
- List of newspapers in the Czech Republic
