= Aha! (tabloid) =

Czech daily newspaper

- The front page of Aha! dated 16 May 2012
- Type: Daily newspaper
- Format: Tabloid
- Owner: Czech News Center
- Publisher: Czech Print Center
- Founded: 1 October 2004; 22 years ago
- Language: Czech
- Headquarters: Prague
- Sister newspapers: Blesk
- Website: Aha!

Aha! is a daily tabloid newspaper published in Prague, the Czech Republic. It has been in circulation since 2004.

== History and profile ==
Aha! was established in October 2004 and its owner was Ebika. The daily was bought by Ringier, more specifically Ringier Axel Springer Czech Republic, in October 2007.

The owner of the paper is the Czech News Center, which acquired it in 2013. The publisher is the Czech Print Center, a subsidiary of the CNC.

The paper focuses on the news about the Czech celebrities. The major audience of the daily is the Czech youth. It is published in tabloid format and has a right-wing stance.

Aha! has been sued by several Czech public figures, including Michal Viewegh, a Czech writer, due to its allegedly false reports.

Ringier stated that Aha! was the second best-selling tabloid in the country after Blesk which was also owned by it. The 2006 circulation of Aha! was 91,000 copies and it was 140,022 in August 2007. The circulation of the paper was 114,238 copies in 2008 and 107,271 copies in 2009. It was 100,397 copies in 2010 and 88,671 in 2011.

== See also ==
- List of newspapers in the Czech Republic
