= Prager Zeitung =

German newspaper in the Czech Republic

- Type: Weekly newspaper
- Publisher: Prago Media
- Founded: 1991; 35 years ago
- Political alignment: Liberal
- Language: German
- Headquarters: Prague
- Website: www.pragerzeitung.cz

The Prager Zeitung was a German newspaper in the Czech Republic issued weekly in Prague; it now publishes online only.

== History and profile ==
Prager Zeitung was founded in 1991. It considers itself as a successor of the Prager Tagblatt, a German-language daily in Bohemia published from 1876 to 1939.

Prager Zeitung, published by Prago Media spol, is an independent publication and has a liberal political leaning. It provides political news and puts special emphasis on the relations between the Czech Republic and its German-speaking neighbors. Its former editors include Egon Erwin Kisch and Max Brod.

The weekly is also distributed in Germany, Austria and Switzerland. It is the largest non-Czech newspaper published in the Czech Republic.

== See also ==
- Germans in the Czech Republic
- Deutsche Schule Prag
