= Britské listy =

Czech-language cultural and political internet daily

- Frequency: Daily
- First issue: 1996
- Country: Czech Republic, United Kingdom
- Based in: Prague, Glasgow
- Language: Czech
- Website: blisty.cz
- ISSN: 1213-1792

Britské listy is a Czech-language cultural and political internet daily. It is published by a reader-financed NGO Britske Listy o.s. (Czech: Občanské sdružení Britské listy) based in Prague.

The website was founded in July 1996 by Jan Čulík, Senior Lecturer in Czech Studies at the University of Glasgow, Scotland. Since it began, the website has argued that the purpose of its journalism is to introduce ideas from the outside world into a fairly enclosed, circular, Czech-language dependent political and cultural discourse within the Czech Republic. The main purpose of Britské listy has been to challenge ideas which it claims circulate uncritically within the Czech Republic.

Britské listy is one of several Knowledge Exchange projects operated by Glasgow University.

A poll of the readership conducted in 2007 showed a disproportionately high representation of urban men with higher education and high income.

Since April 2015, in cooperation with Regionální televise.cz, a Czech cable TV station, Britské listy broadcasts weekly fifteen-minute interviews on topical political and cultural issues.

In 2001, a Britské listy journalist, Tomas Pecina, was arrested and charged for criticising a new law passed in the Czech Republic prohibiting sympathy for the September 11 attacks in New York City.

== Publications ==
Britské listy has published four book collections of its articles

- Jak Češi myslí (The Way Czechs Think), Chomutov: Millenium Publishing, 1999
- Jak Češi jednají (The Way Czechs Act), Chomutov: Millenium Publishing 2000, (with Tomáš Pecina)
- V hlavních zprávách: Televise (On the Main News: Television), Prague: ISV, 2001
- Jak Češi bojují (The Way Czechs Fight), Prague, Libri, 2003.
