= Jan Čulík =

Czech journalist and academic

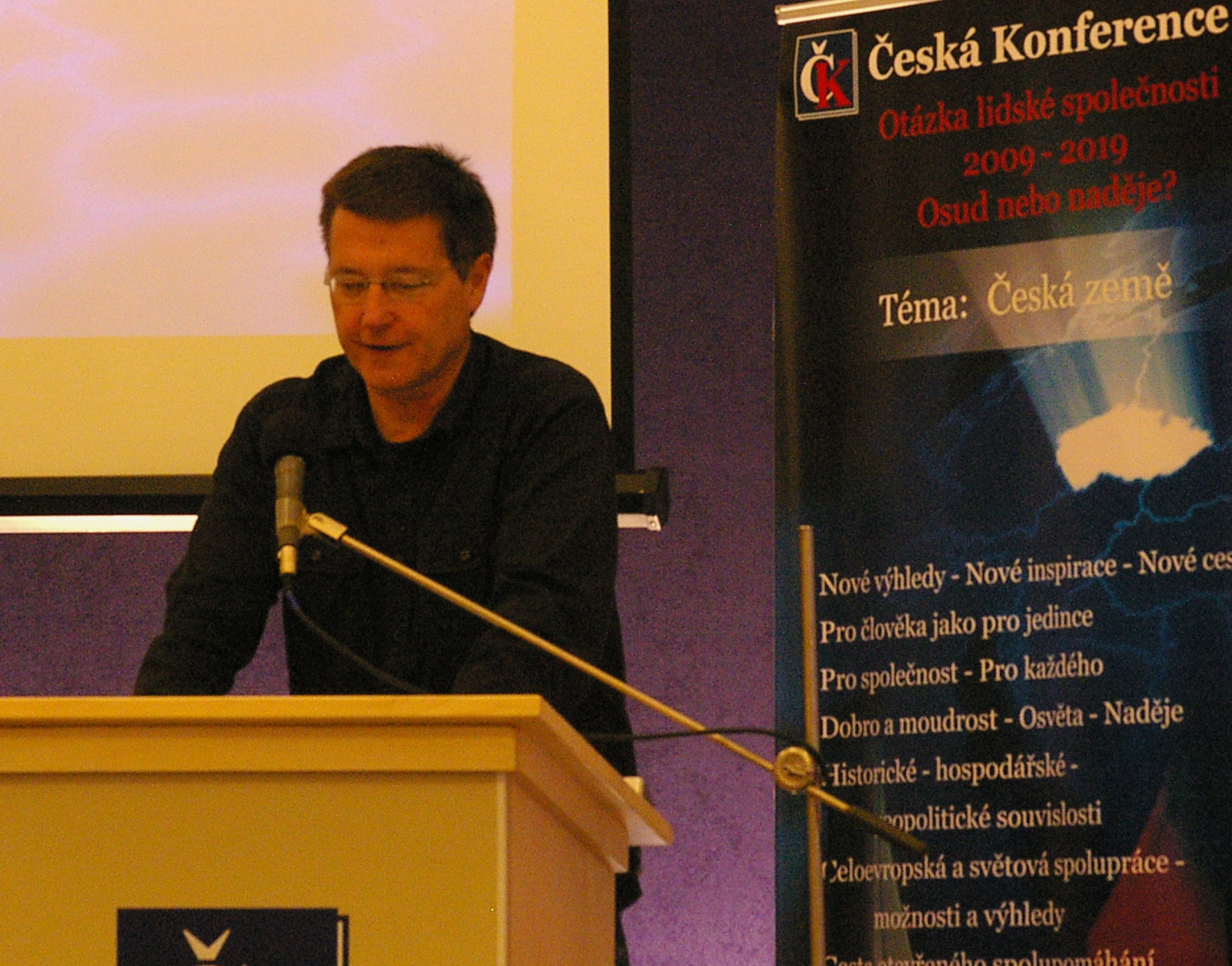
- Jan Čulík in 2010
- Born: 2 November 1952 (age 73)
- Occupations: Academic and independent journalist
- Known for: Founder and editor of Britské listy

Jan Čulík (born 2 November 1952 in Prague) is a Czech academic and independent journalist. He is the founder and editor of the independent Czech Internet daily Britské listy since 1996.

== Early career ==
Čulík is a graduate of Czech studies and English studies at the Faculty of Arts, Charles University in Prague (1977, PhDr 1978.) In the 1980s, he worked as a television producer in the United Kingdom, making films for Channel 4. He also worked with a number of Czech dissident organisations in the West, helping to disseminate information about pre-1989 oppression in Czechoslovakia. Beginning in 1989, Čulík worked as an investigative journalist for the Czech service of Radio Free Europe.

== Recent activity ==
Čulík is Senior Lecturer in Czech Studies at the University of Glasgow, Scotland, and the author of several publications in this field, including the first detailed study of Czech émigré literature, Books behind the Fence: Czech Literature in Émigré Publishing Houses 1971-1989, and a series of collections of articles from Britské Listy: Jak Češi Myslí (How Czechs Think), Jak Češi Jednají (How Czechs Act), Jak Češi Bojují (How Czechs Fight) and V Hlavních zprávách: Televize (On the Main News: Television). In November 2007, he published an extensive monograph about Czech cinema since the fall of Communism. In November 2012, he published a monograph dealing with the stereotypes disseminated by post-communist Czech feature film entitled A Society in Distress: The Image of the Czech Republic in Contemporary Czech Feature Film, and in September 2013 he published, in cooperation with six other international scholars, a monograph entitled National Mythologies in Central European TV Series: How J.R. won the Cold War.

== Books ==
- 1985 - Orpheus Through the Ages: An Introduction to the History of the Orpheus Myth, Channel Four Television Limited, London, ISBN 9781851440009
- 1991 - Knihy za ohradou: Česká literatura v exilových nakladatelstvích 1971-1989 (Books Behind the Fence: Czech Literature in Émigré Publishing Houses 1971–1989), Trizonia Publishers, Prague
- November 2007 - Jací jsme: Česká společnost v hraném filmu devadesátých a nultých let (What we are like: Czech society in feature film of the 1990s and 2000s), Host, Brno, ISBN 978-80-7294-254-1
- November 2012 - A Society in Distress: The Image of the Czech Republic in Contemporary Czech Feature Film, Sussex Academic Press, ISBN 978-1-84519-551-9
- September 2013 - National Mythologies in Central European TV Series: How J.R. won the Cold War, Sussex Academic Press, ISBN 978-1-84519-596-0
