= Youth in the Czech Republic =

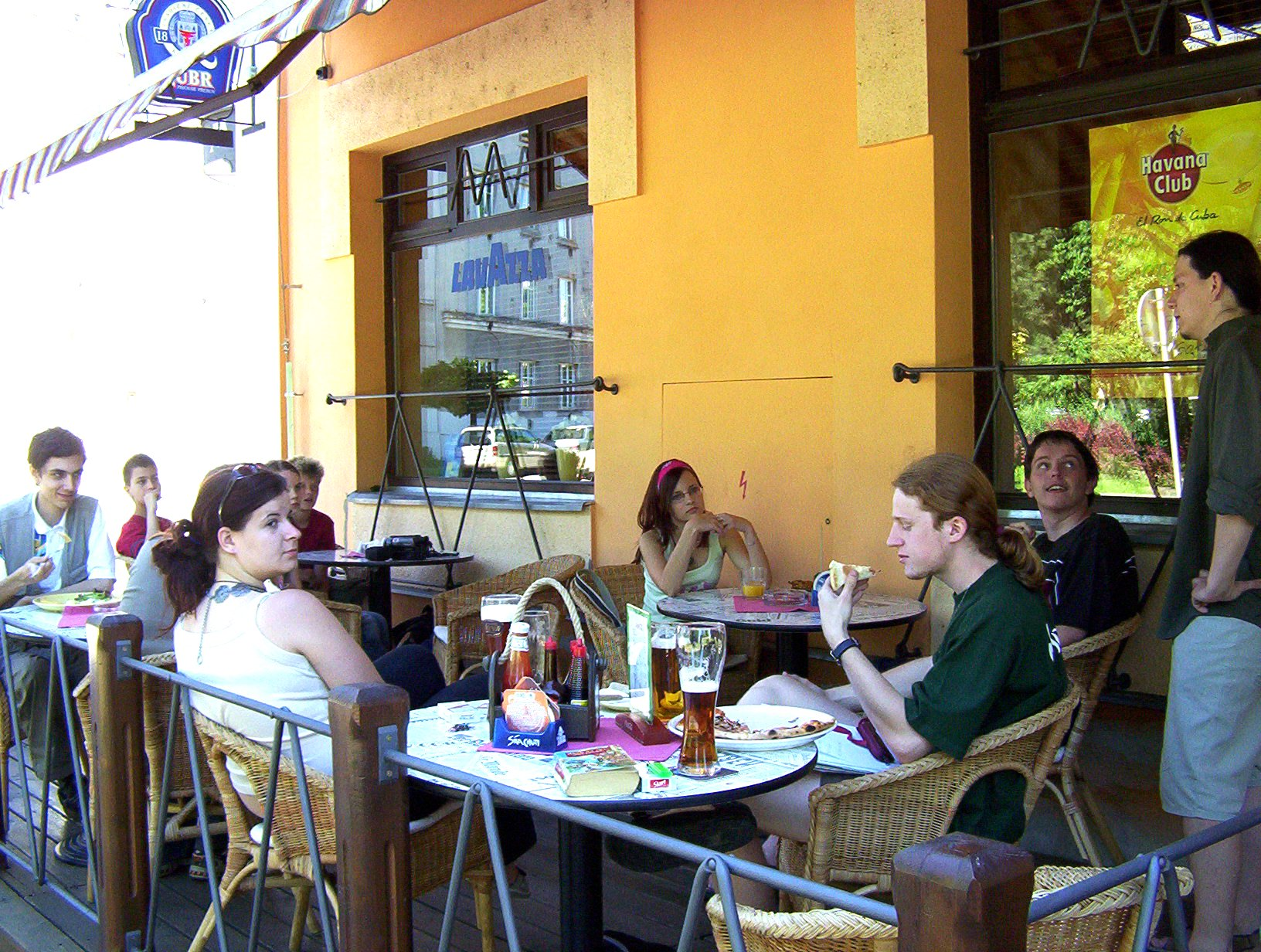
Czech youths enjoy a meal together.

In the Czech Republic, 15–32 years old is the commonly used range for youth. The transition from youth to adulthood can be affected by increased years in non-compulsory education to the point of becoming financially independent. Estimated projections in 2013 of the total population of this range will be 1.8 million or 5.6% of the total population with 877,000 females and 923,000 males.

With the fall of communism and the Velvet Revolution in 1989, the experiences of youth in the post-revolutionary Czech Republic have been recognized as useful markers of cultural, political, and social trends. Consumption in the Czech economy has led to a need for individualization of youth. This consumption also leads to a connection between youth lives through common biographies during a time of rapid change.

== Family ==
Parents do not expect younger youths to contribute to housework or family finances. They are encouraged to join organizations, such as scouting, or sport clubs, such as soccer or hockey. A working youth is likely to spend their income on themselves rather than contribute to the family.

Dating and courtship are common behaviors among Czech youth, usually starting at age 15 or 16. Younger Czechs are likely to pay for their own expenses on a date. With older Czechs, it is common for the male to pay the expenses. There are few taboos for dating, and Czech youths can date anyone they are interested in regardless of ethnicity or religion. Parental approval is not usually sought after for the selection of a dating partner.

The average age Czechs marry vary slightly between gender groups. Females will normally marry in their early to mid-twenties, while males usually marry in their mid to late twenties. A wedding at a church is selected by some Czechs, and incorporation of traditional customs is expected. The husband is looked at as the head of the household, but couples commonly make decisions and split tasks together.

== Religion ==
Although the Czech Republic has traditionally been linked to Roman Catholic or Protestant values, atheism is the cultural norm. Almost 90% of youth report never having participated in a religious group of any kind. Compared to the rest of Eastern Europe and to other regions of the world, this is relatively low participation.

== Education ==
Education is required between the ages of 6 and 16. Many private and religious schools started in the post-revolutionary Czech Republic although enrollment in university overall is at least half when compared to other European countries such as Germany, Austria, and Poland.

The Department of Physical Education and Sports has a compulsory curriculum of physical education from primary school through university level.

Students around 15–18 can continue educational pursuits in general secondary schooling to prepare for university as well as attend a vocational or technical school. Over 90% of boys and girls attend secondary school. A gender gap emerges in tertiary education, with 2013 data reporting over 70% of girls but only 51% of boys attending. Similar patterns exist throughout Eastern Europe.

== Employment ==
In 2010 3.8% youths aged from 15 to 19 and 13.6% of those aged from 20 to 24 were not in education or employment (NEET). There is a strong correlation between the accomplishments in education and employment. The unemployment rate of students with a post-secondary education was just above 5% in 2011 compared to that of 28% of students with only basic or no education. The average time spent on transition from school to work, 4.1 months, is faster than the European Union average.

In 2011, almost 25% of youths between 15–24 were considered employed. Globally in 2011, youths between 16–24 were around 17.5% unemployment.

Czechs will generally start working at the age of 18 but often they will start employment in their early to mid-twenties. Traditionally, most workers would stay at a job for life, but today Czechs can change jobs at will.

== Crime ==
At the age of 15, youths are considered to have diminished criminal responsibility and reach the age of full criminal responsibility at 18. In the 10 years prior to and including 2006, there were 4,000 projects, the majority aimed at juvenile crime, introduced to increase cooperation between citizens, municipal bodies, and the Czech police. The goal of these programs is to increase education, training, and crime prevention within the communities by providing youth with several leisure and sports activities.

Boys are the victims of robbery four times that of girls but for both boys and girls, the risk of victimization of robbery decreases with grade level.

== Health ==
A 2009–2010 Health Behaviour in School-aged Children (HBSC) survey found that 16% of boys and 20% of girls at age 15 report smoking daily. That same study found that 31% of boys and 30% of girls of the same age reported using cannabis at least once.

In a 2006 collection of surveys, 18- to 24-year-olds have a percentage of 20.1% when it comes to heavy episodic drinking events which is higher than the general adult population.
