= Censorship in Czechoslovakia =

Censorship in the Czech Republic had been highly active until 17 November 1989 and the fall of Communism in the former Czechoslovakia. Czech Republic was ranked as the 13th most free country in the World Press Freedom Index in 2014.

== Overview ==
Censorship in the Czech Republic was most prevalent during the Nazi era and communist governance. These regimes enforced a strict system of censorship to ensure that the dissemination of messages to the masses aligned with political objectives. However, the ‘Velvet Revolution’ in 1989 sparked a shift to democracy, where public discourse was freed from state control, signalling the end of censorship restrictions in the Czech Republic.

== Censorship during the Nazi Era/World War II ==
Censorship restrictions in the Czech Republic were most prevalent during the German occupation of Czechoslovakia between 1938 and 1945. During this time, Czech civilians experienced Nazi indoctrination exercised through mass media, where messages distributed reinforced obedience to the ‘Fuhrer’. Censorship was institutionalised in 1938, where the Nazi occupation of the Czech Republic meant that the army and the Gestapo assumed authority to censor all media.

=== Censorship of Radio ===
The Reich Minister of Propaganda, Goebbels, utilised the radio as a mouthpiece for the regime. The radio was a mechanism for disseminating propaganda maintained through a strict system of censorship. The government imposed harsh restrictions on Czech civilians that owned a radio. The foreign minister of Germany (Konstantin von Neurath) espoused that anyone intentionally distributing news that did not align with Nazi ideologies would be imprisoned or killed. Following this announcement, listening to foreign broadcasts became illegal in 1940. Despite this law, as the Reich Protector's Office acknowledged, locating radio-listeners was nearly impossible. Nazi officials attempted to control radio listeners through intimidation tactics, whereby officials sent those who owned a radio a gold-plated plate the words engraved, “listening to foreign broadcasts is punishable by death”. Despite these regulations, Czech national loyalty prevailed over censorship restrictions. Civilians carried disassembled radio parts in their pockets, and once reassembling the pieces, could listen to foreign broadcasts.

=== Censorship of Literature ===
Within the realm of literature, the boundaries between political and social spheres were blurred, where all published books mirrored Nazi ontologies. To ensure this, the Nazi government censored all literature to make sure civilians were engaging with literary works that adhered to Nazi ideals. During the Nazi occupation of Czechoslovakia, the Gestapo confiscated any material that encapsulated negative aspects of Nazi life, these books were mainly “decadent literature”. The communist government produced lists of libri prohibiti and composers faced harsh penalties for not complying with censorship standards, such as imprisonment. Books that explored explicit themes of a sexual nature were also banned, such as pornography. The Nazi ideology that sexual intercourse was solely for procreation was reinforced through literature. Adhering to a Nazi perspective, the role of women was to become mothers, sexual ethical issues surrounding contraception and birth control methods were censored. Authors that published works that explored such topics were listed as “parasites of the people” because they subverted Nazi ideologies and culminated opposition. The Nazis wanted to orchestrate all literature to reinforce Nazi ideologies, disseminating these ideals throughout the Czech Republic.

=== Censorship of Music ===
Censorship restrictions also applied to music, transitioning towards ‘Gleichschaltung’ (the coordination or economic, political and social sectors) meant that officials policed the broadcasting of music. The Reich Chamber of Culture aimed to reintroduce the neo-Wagnerian genre - folk music which was popular in Germany during 1920. Aryan singers, like Wagner, were broadcast on radio programs, promoting conservative values and stimulating nationalistic pride. The Nazi government endorsed this genre of music as opposed to American Jazz which governments banned in the Czech Republic in 1938. The Reich Chamber of Culture established a separate unit within the chamber, specially composed of senior members assigned the responsibility of supervising and censoring social performances, such as opera or church music. In the Czech Republic, music broadcast on radio programmes consisted mainly of opera, as Nazi officials promoted a return to conservatism. Censorship of theatre performances also existed in the Czech Republic, with the passing of the Reich's theatre Act in 1934 which facilitated this. Theatre drama reflected and reinforced Nazi doctrines, the idea of individual sacrifice for the betterment of society and obedience to the Fuhrer were common themes embedded in plays. ‘Pillars of Society’ by Ibsen is an example of this, composed for propaganda purposes, exploring ideas of extreme nationalism and the glorification of war.

== Censorship during the Cold War ==
Censorship under the authority of the Communist Party of Czechoslovakia (CPC) was more relaxed than that of the Nazi regime. However, in 1968, the CPC agreed to the Moscow Protocols, a document between Soviet and Czech leaders to authorise the stationing of troops in the Czech Republic, making the Czech Republic a satellite state of Soviet Union (USSR). The USSR invasion of Czechoslovakia prompted strict censorship regulations, as the USSR feared the influence of Americanisation on civilians and its potential to destabilise communist ideologies. Political scientist Joseph Nye's theory of ‘Soft Power’ (1980) - a country's tendency to propagate a desired self-image to attain superiority over other countries, was employed through American cultural manifestations such as rock ‘n’ roll to culminate support for democratic societies.

=== Self-censorship ===
Following the Moscow Protocols in 1968, media practitioners adopted ‘self-censorship’ which was the responsibility appointed to media producers in censoring their own content, who “... created such media content as they supposed was required by the ruling power”. Media practitioners, such as journalists or film producers, protected themselves from potential penalisation by projecting the communist lifestyle in a positive light, creating an “atmosphere of silent pressure…”. However, journalists whose works were deemed ambiguous or containing an underlying satirical tone, in regards to communist governments and their regulations, resulted in unemployment and possible imprisonment. Communist authorities endeavoured to ‘clean’ the media industry of any journalists who were opposed to the communist regime, replacing them with writers who were supporters and promoted socialist and communist governments.

=== Censorship of Rock 'n' Roll ===
Rock’ n’ roll during the Cold War period played a role in the collapse and disintegration of the Communist regime. Rock ‘n’ roll served as an instrument employed by democratic America to destabilise communist ontologies, depicting the democratic lifestyle in a glamorous light. Communist authorities viewed rock music as representative of democratic ideologies and Western culture. Mikhail Gorbachev (a Czech civilian) recounted that rock and roll was "our quiet way of rejecting the system while conforming to most of its demands". The emergence of rock bands which gained popularity and a large fanbase prompted communist authorities to impose restrictions on rock ‘n’ roll music, where the leader of the Department of Art published a “Trojan list” which consisted of 35 rock music bands that officials banned in the Czech Republic.

The communist response was to create alternatives, creating propaganda media campaigns to undermine the popularity of rock culture. For example, comparing rock to the “devil's music” in an attempt to prompt civilians to adopt more conservative taste in music. To suppress the influence of Americanisation, the CPC banned the smuggling and distribution of ‘bone music’, which was gramophone recordings made from X-ray films. Bone music played prohibited rock ‘n’ roll music banned from broadcast in the Czech Republic, such as Elvis Presley's records. The tension between Czech communist leaders and youth was evident in the 1968 Prague Spring, which was a period of political liberalisation. The Prague Spring resulted in the formation of ‘The Plastic People of the Universe’, a band that was an emblem of anti-communist values and Czech's underground culture. The Plastic People of the Universe rejected communist ideologies through music, where Pareles stated that fans “...endured police beatings and other reprisals just to hear what the band had to say”.

=== Censorship of Film ===
The Czech film industry suffered significantly after WW2 and film distributors couldn't keep up with the demand for new movies. This posed ample opportunities for America to infiltrate the Czech film industry, strengthening the presence of America over the Iron Curtain, threatening the authority of communism. America utilised their superiority in the film industry and cinematic achievements as an advantage to influence the public opinion of Soviet civilians. The American film industry had an active interest in penetrating foreign markets, such as the Czech Republic. From 1947, the US government established the ‘House of Un-American Activities Committee’ which interrogated film producers for any links with communist organisations over the Iron Curtain, removing all communist sympathisers. As a result, American film distributors produced motion pictures that illuminated explicit anti-communist themes. Communist authorities could not escape or suppress the influence of Americanisation which seeped through and penetrated the film industry, where almost 60% of movies showcased in the Czech Republic were foreign origin. During 1946–1949, foreign films were popular in the Czech Republic, referred to as ‘trophy films’. These trophy films were produced and written in America, although communist authorities manipulated the meaning of these films through censorship. For example, changing subtitles to align with communist ideals. Soviet authorities attempted to suppress the impact of Hollywood and Americanisation on Czech civilians, through the release of Soviet films throughout 1950 and 1960s, spreading a positive depiction of Soviet lifestyle.

== End of censorship ==
=== Velvet Revolution ===
The Velvet Revolution was a non-violent uprising in the Czech Republic capital, Prague, from November to December 1989. The Velvet Revolution became a statement of resistance against the communist regime, which eventually led to its overthrow and establishment of a democratic government. Revolution sparked when university students protested in the streets of Prague on 17 November 1989. Due to the dissemination of nonconformist messages, police brutally attacked the university students. This police attack evoked mass opposition, where the coalition Civic Forum unified civilians, bringing 75% of the population in a general strike followed by street demonstrations. By the end of these demonstrations, the Communist Party of Czechoslovakia relinquished its power, and Vaclav Havel was now the president of democratic Czechoslovakia. This new pressure to eradicate communism in the Czech Republic prompted the abolishment of censorship restrictions, meaning that public discourse was free from political control. Previously, the media was the primary propaganda mechanism for the communist party, where officials chose the information to be distributed and excluded, presenting events in the world in compliance with official ideologies.

=== Democratic Czech Republic ===
The president of the Czech Republic, Havel, diminished censorship restrictions that were mandated by Soviet authorities. This afforded more artistic freedom and expression, making the media a separate institution from the state. In terms of the film industry, more than 50% of the Czech press was owned by foreign bodies, mostly Soviet corporations. Havel introduced broadcasting laws, ‘The Law on Radio and Television Broadcasting’ in 1991, which abolished the government's monopoly on broadcasting programmes, such as television or radio. This allowed producers to compose works devoid of government influence or pressures. The newly formed democratic government of the Czech Republic reorganised the Barrandov Film Studio in Prague, the largest film studio in Europe, reaffirming the new freedoms and liberties that are afforded under the democratic government. This remains the case today, where the Czech Republic has a relatively low rate of censorship restrictions - having the 23rd lowest rate of internet censorship out of a ranking of 179 countries.
