= Landeszeitung der Deutschen in Böhmen, Mähren und Schlesien =

German-language magazine in the Czech Republic

LandesEcho is a German-language magazine in the Czech Republic issued every 14 days by the Landesversammlung der deutschen Vereine in der Tschechischen Republik in Prague.
