= Czech News Center =

Media house in the Czech Republic

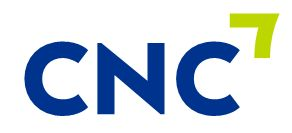
- Type: Akciová společnost
- Industry: Mass media
- Predecessor: Ringier Axel Springer CZ a.s.
- Founded: November 21, 2013; 12 years ago
- Headquarters: Prague, Czech Republic
- Area served: Czech Republic
- Key people: Martina Říhová (CEO and chair)
- Revenue: 2.050 billion Kč (2024)
- Operating income: −422.0 million Kč (2024)
- Net income: −421.5 million Kč (2024)
- Total assets: 2.546 billion Kč (2024)
- Number of employees: 933 (2024)
- Parent: Czech Media Invest a.s.
- Website: www.cncenter.cz/en/

Czech News Center a.s. (CNC) is a Czech mass media company based in Prague and part of Czech Media Invest. It is one of the largest publishing groups in the Czech Republic, with a portfolio that includes the daily newspapers Blesk, Sport and Aha!, the magazines Reflex and Svět motorů, and the business news outlet e15, alongside numerous digital media brands.

The company is the legal successor to Ringier Axel Springer CZ, whose Czech publishing operations were acquired from Ringier and Axel Springer by Daniel Křetínský and Patrik Tkáč in 2014.

== History ==
The company's predecessor, Ringier Axel Springer CZ, was the Czech subsidiary of Ringier Axel Springer Media, a joint venture between the Swiss publisher Ringier and Germany's Axel Springer SE. In December 2013, Ringier Axel Springer Media agreed to sell its Czech operations, including Ringier Axel Springer CZ and its stake in the press distributor První novinová společnost, to Czech businessmen Daniel Křetínský and Patrik Tkáč. The company was valued at €170 million.

The acquisition was completed in 2014, and the Czech publishing business became part of Czech News Center. Its portfolio included the daily newspapers Blesk, Aha! and Sport, together with magazines and online media.

In 2016, the group expanded its portfolio with media assets formerly published by Mladá fronta, including the business newspaper E15 and more than a dozen magazines and websites.

== Operations ==
Czech News Center publishes newspapers, magazines and digital media. Its principal news and magazine brands include the tabloid daily Blesk, the sports daily Sport, Aha!, the weekly Reflex, the business news outlet e15 and the automotive magazine Svět motorů. The company also publishes children's, lifestyle, automotive and specialist titles, including ABC, Mateřídouška and Lidé a Země.

The company's publications are accompanied by a substantial digital-media operation. Its main online properties include Blesk.cz, iSport.cz, Reflex.cz and e15.cz.

Printing is carried out through Czech Print Center, which operates printing facilities in Prague and Ostrava. The facilities produce newspapers and other publications for Czech News Center as well as external customers.

Czech News Center also holds a 27.02% interest in První novinová společnost (PNS), one of the main distributors of newspapers and magazines in the Czech Republic. The other major shareholders are Mafra and Vltava Labe Media.
