= Vltava Labe Media =

Czech company

Vltava Labe Media, a.s.
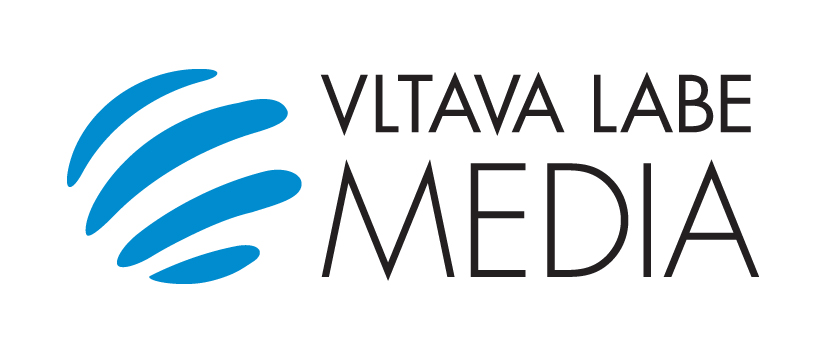
- Company type: Joint-stock company
- Founded: 1 March 2013
- Headquarters: Prague, Czech Republic
- Revenue: 2,121,383,000 Czech koruna (2019)
- Operating income: −52,299,000 Czech koruna (2019)
- Net income: −119,647,000 Czech koruna (2019)
- Total assets: 2,084,203,000 Czech koruna (2019)
- Owner: Penta Investments
- Number of employees: 908 (2019)
- Website: www.vlmedia.cz

Vltava Labe Media (formerly Vltava-Labe-Press) is a Czech publishing house - the second biggest in the Czech Republic. Since November 2015 it belongs to investment company Penta Investments which acquired it from the German publishing groupe Verlagsgruppe Passau. It was created in 2000 by the merger of a number of companies including publishing companies Labe and Vltava. VLP assumed control of all regional print media in the Czech Republic in 2001, including national publications Zemské noviny and Slovo. As well as publishing regional daily newspaper Deník, the company also publishes fortnightly women's lifestyle magazine Glanc and nationwide tabloid Šíp. In 2013 VLP bought Sanoma Magazines and merged it with Astrosat - the magazine subsidiary which is from 49% owned by German publisher Bertelsmann. Since November 2015 Michal Klíma became the Chairman and CEO of the company. The company Vltava Labe Media, Inc. is the legal successor of company Vltava-Labe-Press, Inc., and Astrosat Media, Ltd., two publishing houses operating on the Czech media market, especially in the print media since 1992. Vltava Labe Media became the owner of the publishing house Media Tablet in 2015.
