= Blesk =

Czech newspaper

- Type: Daily newspaper
- Format: Tabloid
- Owner: Czech News Center
- Editor-in-chief: Radek Lain
- Founded: 14 April 1991; 35 years ago
- Language: Czech
- Headquarters: Prague
- Circulation: 97,000 (as of 2024)
- Sister newspapers: Aha!
- Website: blesk.cz

Blesk (Czech for "Lightning") is a Czech daily tabloid newspaper published by Czech News Center. Founded in 1992, it has become the most-read and best-selling national daily newspaper in the Czech Republic. It covers celebrity and entertainment news, crime and current affairs.

Blesk was launched by the Swiss media company Ringier and later became part of Ringier Axel Springer Media. Its Czech operations were sold to Czech investors in 2013 and subsequently became part of Czech News Center. The Blesk brand also includes the news and entertainment website Blesk.cz.

== History and profile ==
Blesk was founded by journalist Petr Schönfeld with backing from the Swiss media company Ringier, and its first issue appeared on 13 April 1992. The newspaper initially had eight pages and cost two Czechoslovak korunas. It quickly gained a large readership, and by January 1993 its print run had reached 500,000 copies for the first time. A television magazine was introduced in 1992, followed by the Sunday edition Nedělní Blesk in March 1993.

The newspaper adopted a mass-market tabloid format influenced by Ringier's Swiss daily Blick and the German newspaper Bild. Its coverage has traditionally focused on celebrity and entertainment news, crime, current affairs and consumer topics.

In 2010, Ringier's Czech publishing operations became part of Ringier Axel Springer Media, a joint venture between Ringier and Axel Springer SE. In December 2013, the company agreed to sell its Czech business, including Blesk, to investors Daniel Křetínský and Patrik Tkáč. The acquisition was completed in April 2014, and Ringier Axel Springer CZ was renamed Czech News Center in June 2014.

== Circulation ==
The circulation of Blesk was 378,000 copies in 2002, making it the best selling newspaper in the country. In October 2003 the paper had a circulation of 485,334 copies and was the most read newspaper in the Czech Republic. Its circulation was 458,000 copies in 2003, making it the best selling newspaper in the country. In December 2004 the paper had a circulation of 500,840 copies. It was 514,000 copies for 2004 as a whole.

In 2006, Blesk ranked first with the circulation of 480,000 copies. The 2007 circulation of the paper was 432,170 copies, making it the most read paper in the country. The circulation of Blesk was 435,505 copies in 2008 and 412,238 copies in 2009. It was 384,991 copies in 2010 and 347,566 copies in 2011. In 2012, its circulation was down to 305,600 copies. In 2013, the paper had the second highest circulation in the country.

== See also ==
- List of newspapers in the Czech Republic
