= FNE =

FNE may refer to

- Fane Airport in Papua New Guinea
- Fear of negative evaluation (also known as Atychiphobia)
- Federation of North-American Explorers
- Finance New Europe
- France Nature Environnement, a federation of environmental groups in France
- Free nerve ending
- National Federation of Energy, a former trade union in France
