= List of magazines in the Czech Republic =

In 1989, there was a total of 180 weekly magazines in the Czech Republic. As of 1995 the magazine sector in the country was small and fragmented. In 2010, the number of magazines was nearly 1800.

There are foreign magazine publishing companies in the country, including Sanoma Magazines Praha, which is a subsidiary of Sanoma.

The following is an incomplete list of current and defunct magazines published in the Czech Republic. It also include those published in Czechoslovakia. They may be published in Czech or in other languages.

== 4 ==
- 4Fleet

== A ==
- A2
- abc
- Arbeiter-Illustrierte-Zeitung
- Aspen Review Central Europe

== B ==
- Bydlení

== C ==
- Czech Business Weekly

== D ==
- DTest

== F ==
- Fantastická fakta
- Finance New Europe

== K ==
- Der Kampf

== L ==
- La Gonzo Magazine
- LeveL
- Loutkář
- Lumír
- Lidé a Země

== M ==
- Mariannne Bydlení
- Mladý svět

== O ==
- Orer

== P ==
- Prague.TV, Living Like a Local
- The Prague Tribune
- Pravý Domácí
- Přítomnost

== R ==
- Reflex
- Reporter
- Respekt
- Revolver Revue

== S ==
- SPY
- Světozor
- Svĕt motorů
- Svět sovětů

== T ==
- Těšínsko
- Trifid
- Týden

== V ==
- Vedem
- Vlasta

== X ==
- X-Ink

== Z ==
- Ženské listy
- Zwrot
- ZX Magazín

== See also ==
- List of newspapers in the Czech Republic
