= Bezno =

- Market town
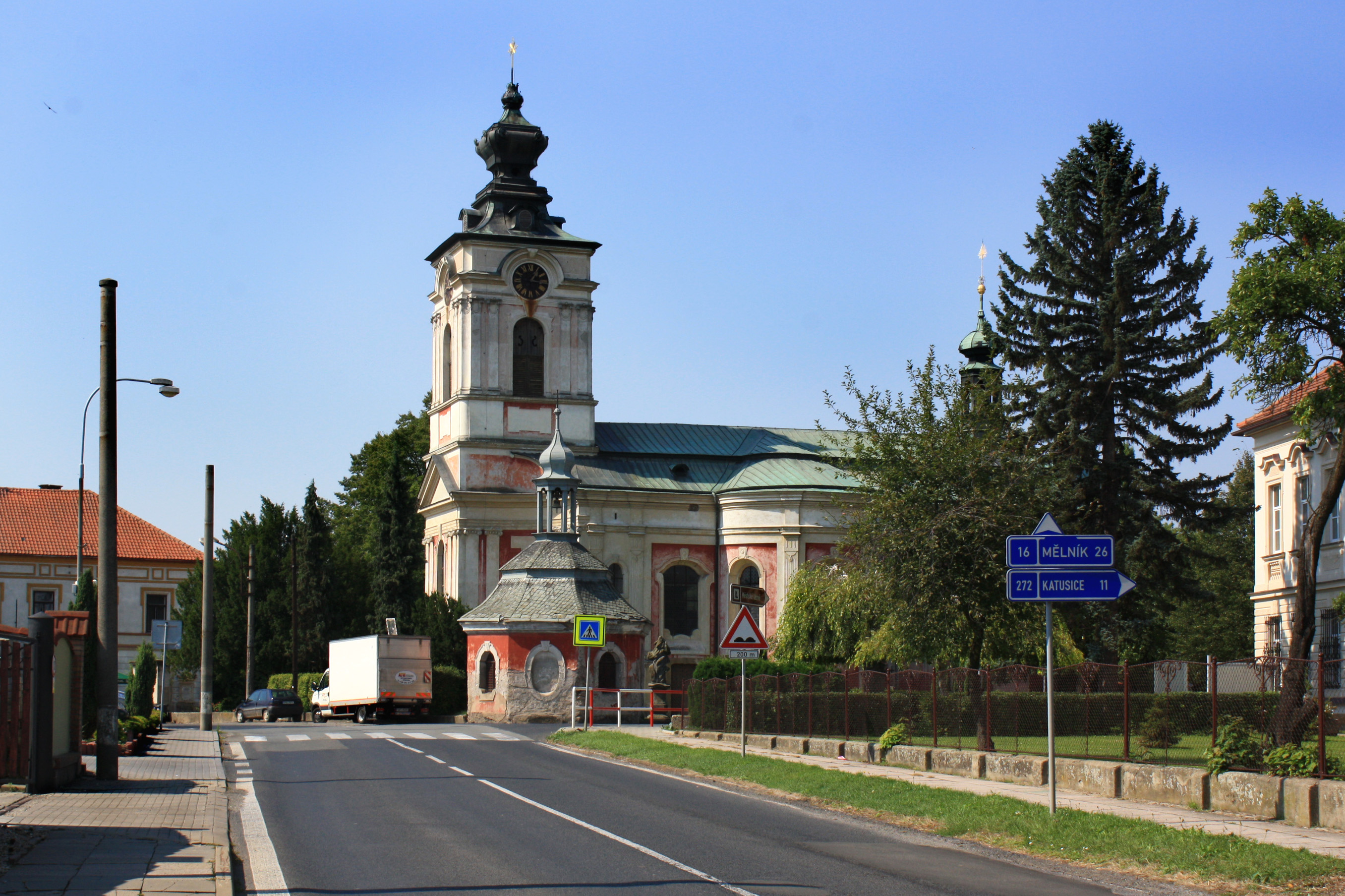
- Church of Saints Peter and Paul

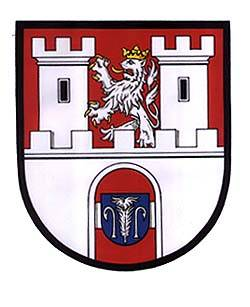
- Flag Coat of arms

- Location in the Czech Republic
- Coordinates: 50°22′2″N 14°47′45″E
- Country: Czech Republic
- Region: Central Bohemian
- District: Mladá Boleslav
- First mentioned: 1088

Area
  - Total: 9.26 km^{2} (3.58 sq mi)
- Elevation: 288 m (945 ft)

Population (2026-01-01)
  - Total: 993
  - Density: 107/km^{2} (278/sq mi)
- Time zone: UTC+1 (CET)
  - Summer (DST): UTC+2 (CEST)
- Postal code: 294 29
- Website: www.bezno.cz

Bezno (Czech pronunciation: [ˈbɛzno]) is a market town in Mladá Boleslav District in the Central Bohemian Region of the Czech Republic. It has about 1,000 inhabitants.

== Etymology ==
The name is derived from the Czech word bez, i.e. 'elderberry'.

== Geography ==
Bezno is located about 9 kilometres (6 mi) southwest of Mladá Boleslav and 34 km (21 mi) northeast of Prague. It lies in a flat landscape in the Jizera Table. In the centre of Bezno is a fishpond called Kal.

== History ==
The first written mention of Bezno is from 1088. From 1460 to 1694, Bezno was owned by the knights of Bzenský of Proruba. The greatest development occurred during the rule of the Pachta family, who bought Bezno is 1742. They had built here a new castle and had rebuilt the church.

== Demographics ==
Historical population

Year	Pop.	±%
1869	765	—
1880	866	+13.2%
1890	933	+7.7%
1900	943	+1.1%
1910	978	+3.7%

Year	Pop.	±%
1921	922	−5.7%
1930	990	+7.4%
1950	821	−17.1%
1961	866	+5.5%
1970	841	−2.9%

Year	Pop.	±%
1980	837	−0.5%
1991	834	−0.4%
2001	858	+2.9%
2011	875	+2.0%
2021	948	+8.3%

Source: Censuses

== Transport ==
The I/16 road, which connects the D10 motorway with Mělník, passes through the municipality.

== Sights ==
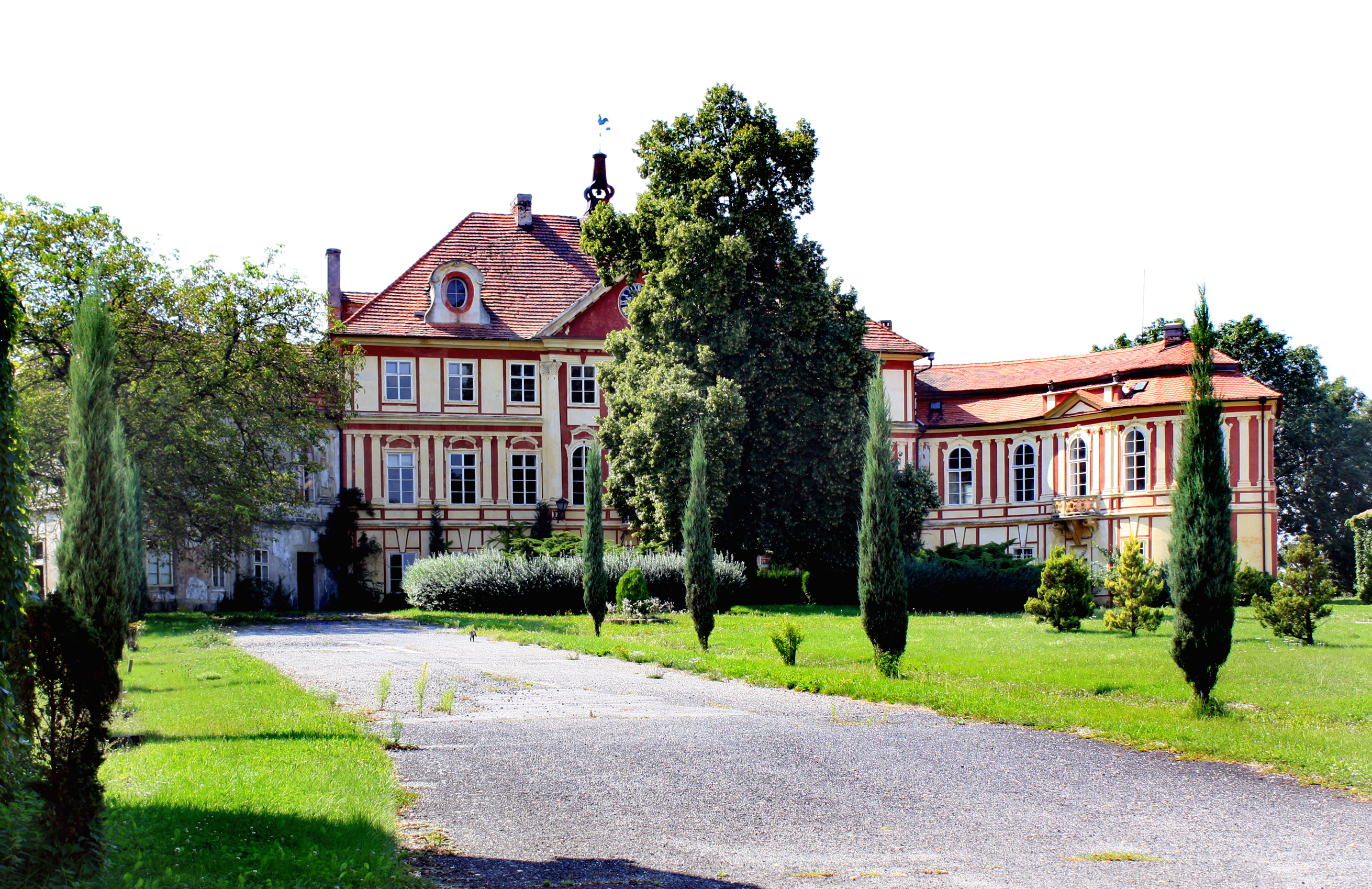
Bezno Castle

The Bezno Castle is a Baroque complex from the mid-18th century, built on the site of an older fortress. Its current form dates from 1817, when it was reconstructed after a fire. Today it is privately owned and unused.

The landmark of the town square is the Church of Saints Peter and Paul. It was built in the Baroque style in 1750–1763.

A valuable building is the former Renaisannce granary. It dates from 1605.

== Gallery ==
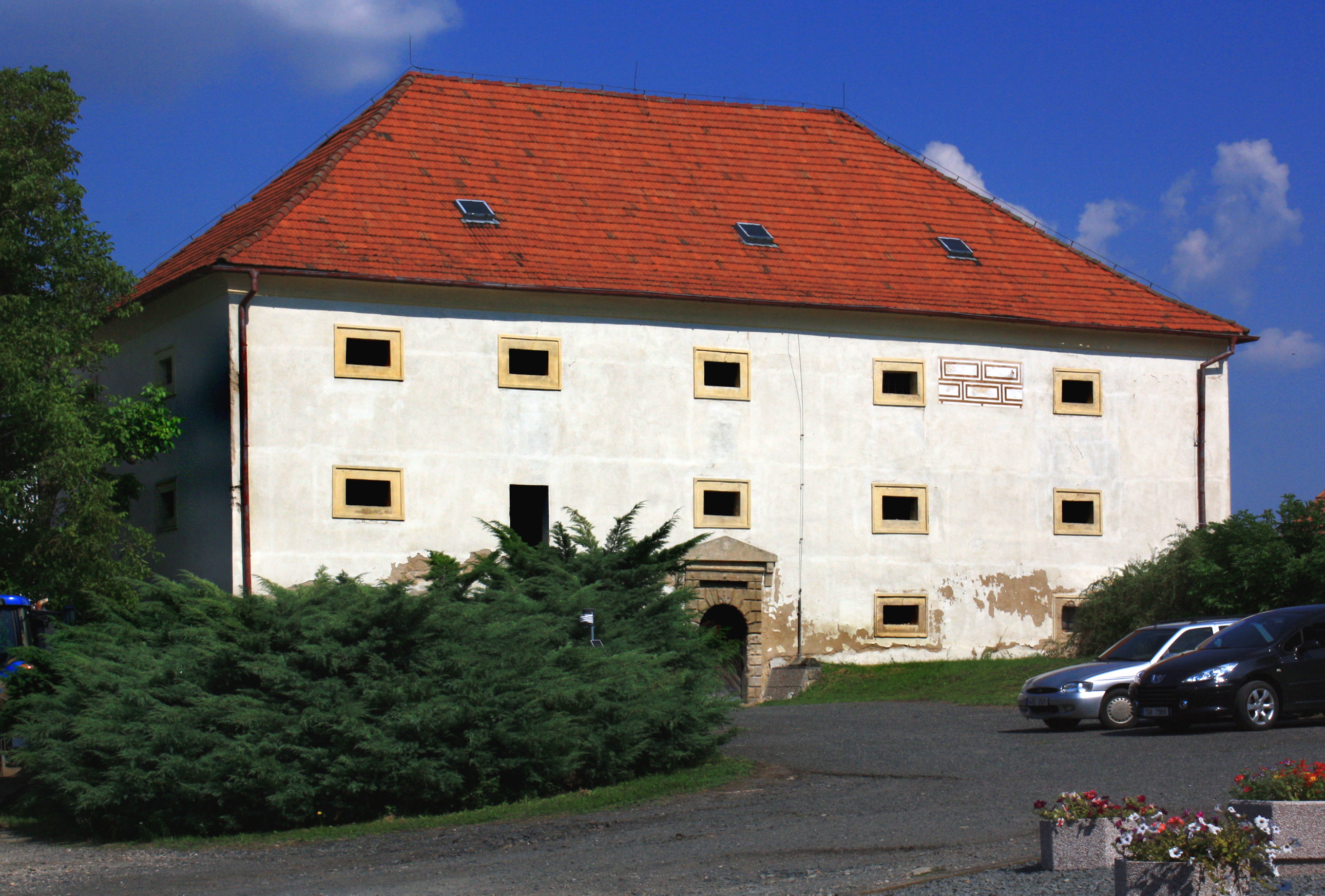
Former granary

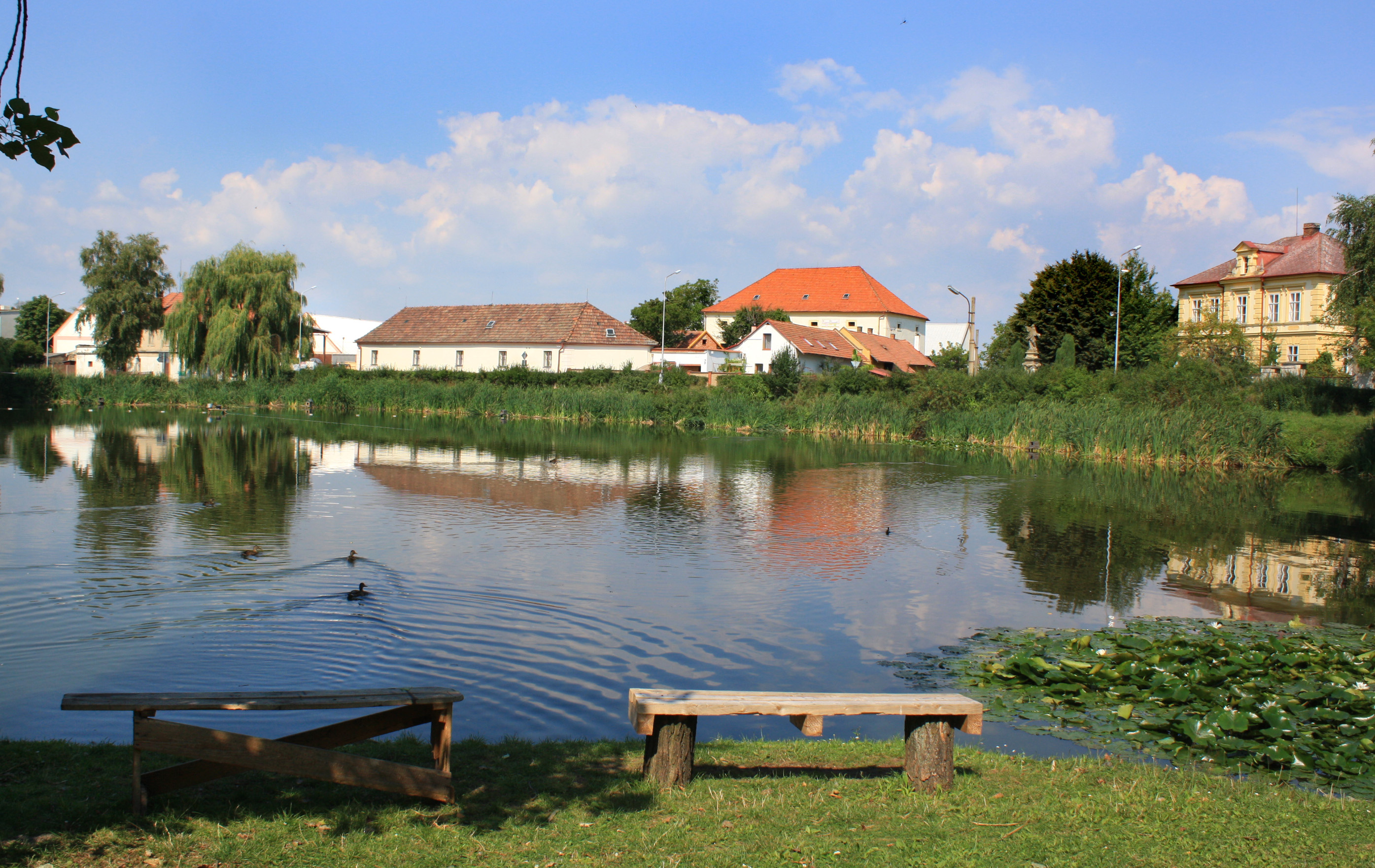
Kal pond

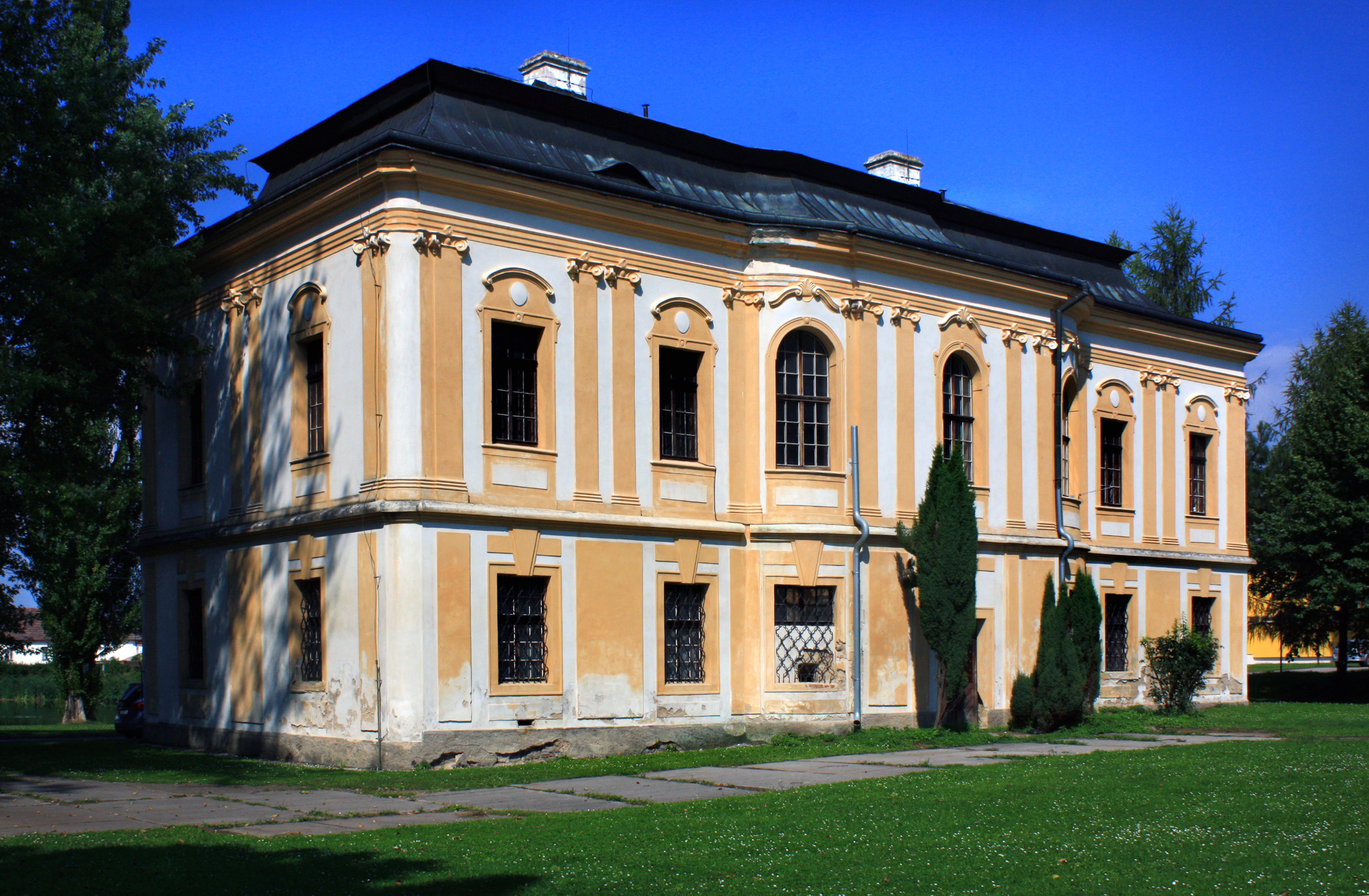
Rectory
