= Svijany Brewery =

Czech brewery

Pivovar Svijany

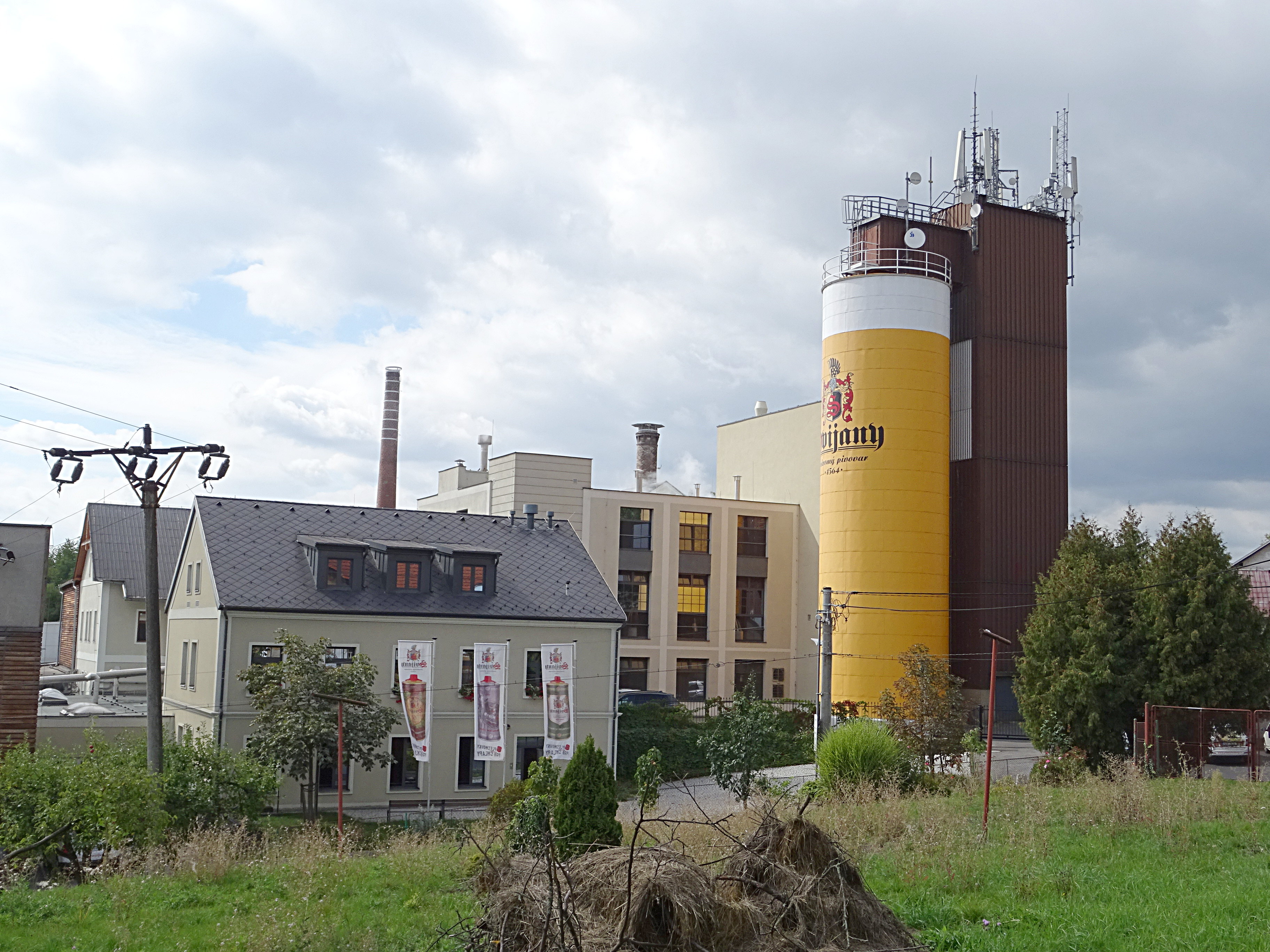
- Location: Svijany, Czech Republic
- Coordinates: 50°34′27″N 15°03′22″E
- Opened: 1564
- Website: https://www.pivovarsvijany.cz/

Svijany Brewery (Czech pronunciation: [ˈsvɪjanɪ]) is a brewery in Svijany in the Czech Republic. Established in 1564, it is one of the oldest Czech breweries.

The brewery produces an extensive range of unpasteurised lagers, mostly light in color and ranging in strength between 3.2% and 6.5% ABV.

In common with the breweries in Náchod and Rohozec, Svijany is owned by the Liberec Investment Fund.

== Production ==
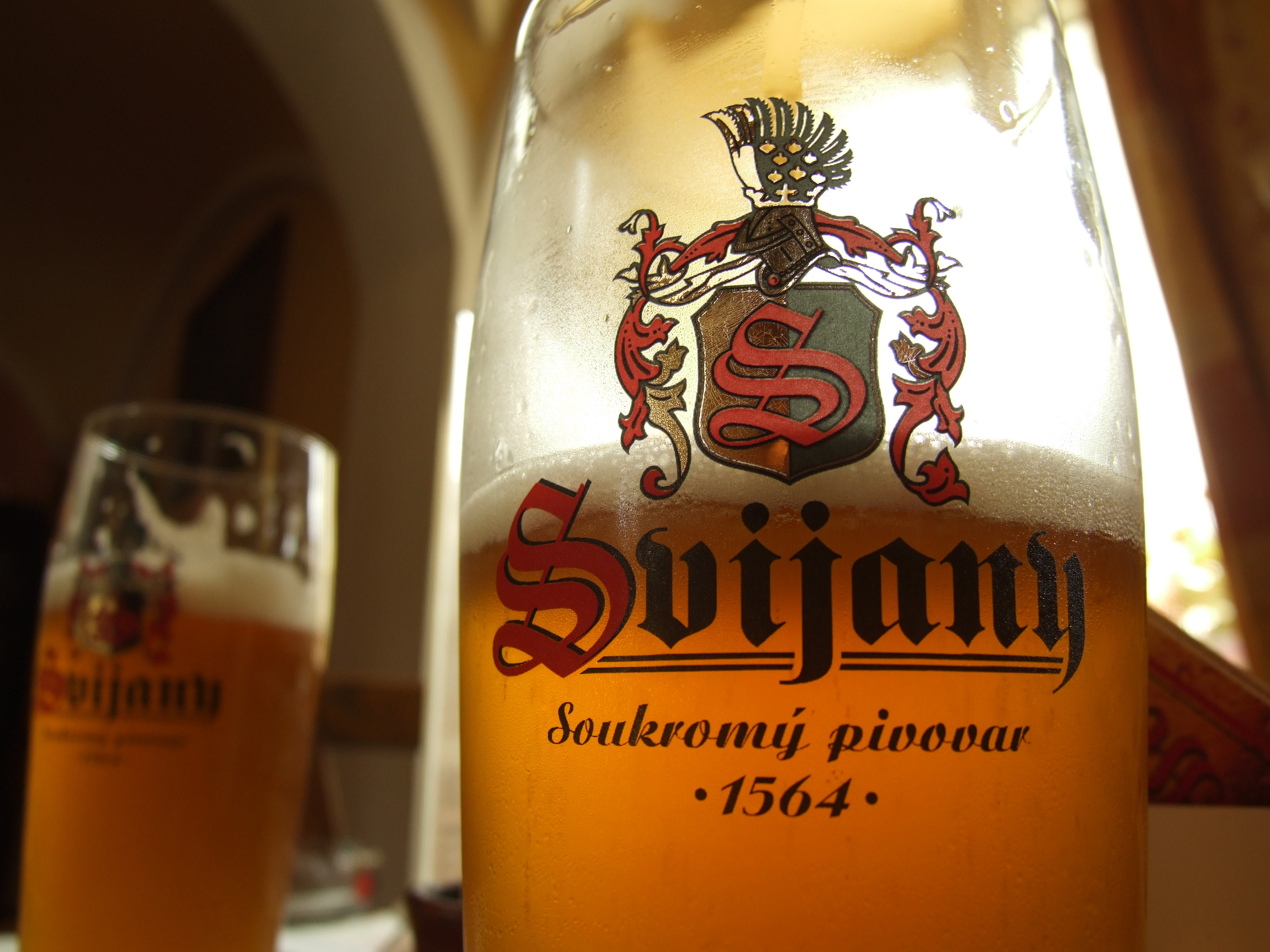
Svijanský Máz in the brewery pub

Svijany are available as a 10°-15°, dark and as a special variant.

- Svijanská Desítka is a deeply fermented 10° pale beer which is 3.8% alcohol by volume (ABV).
- Svijanský Máz a flagship product, it is an 11° typical pale lager which is 4.8% ABV.
- Svijanský Fanda is a special 11° lager, it is mixed dark and light beer.
- Svijanský Rytíř (Knight) is a 12° pale lager which is 5.0% ABV.
- Svijanská Kněžna (Duchess) is a dark 13° beer which is 5.2% ABV.
- Svijanský Kvasničák is a 13° unfiltered beer.
- Svijanský Kníže (Duke) is a 13° pale beer which is 5.5% ABV.
- Svijanský Baron is a special 15° pale beer which is 6.5% ABV.
- Svijanský Fitness is a special light beer which is 3.2% ABV.
- Svijanský Vozka (Driver) is a non-alcoholic beer.
- Svijanský Weizen is a 12° wheat beer.

== History ==
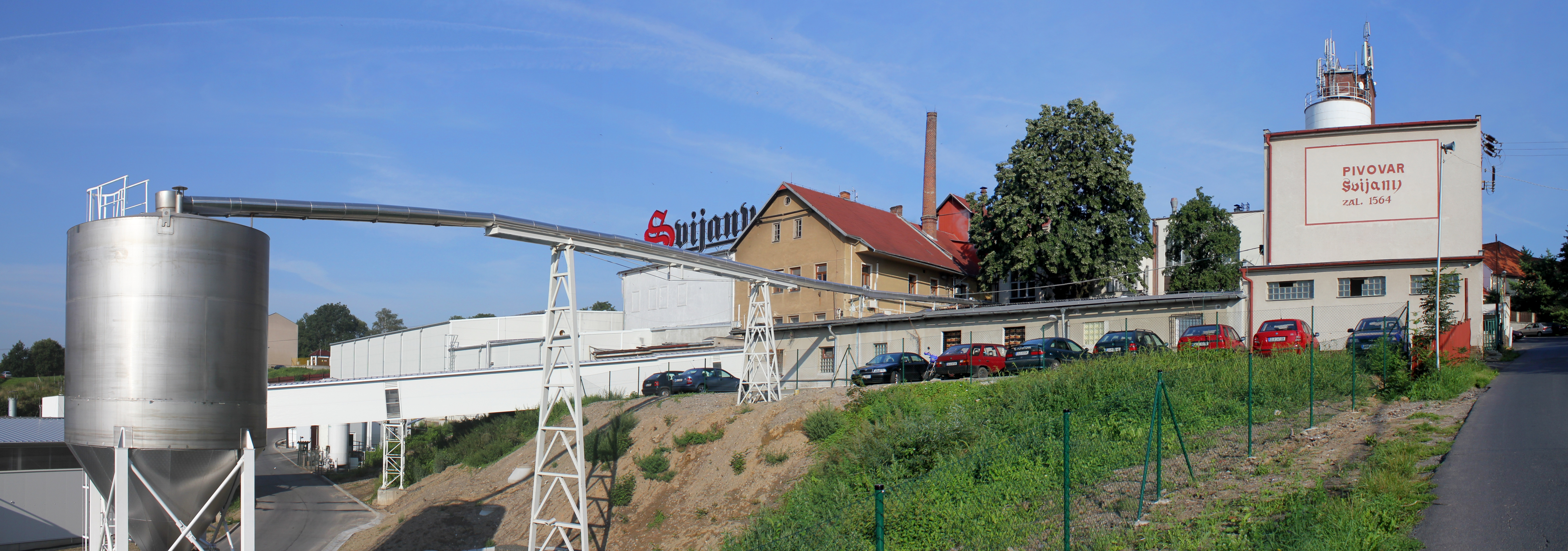
Svijany Brewery

The brewery started to operate in 1564. In 1565, the village of Svijany with the brewery was acquired by Jaroslav of Wartenberg. Upon Jaroslav's death in 1602, the village and brewery passed to Joachim Andreas von Schlick. As a rebel against Habsburg rule of Bohemia, he was executed in 1621, and Svijany came under control of the Wallenstein family through 1814. In 1820, Svijany passed to control of the Rohan family. They sold the brewery to their tenant, Antonín Kratochvíle, whose family continued to operate it until 1939, at which point they were compelled to sell it back to the Rohan family.

In 1945 the brewery was confiscated and nationalized as part of the state-owned Severočeské pivovary, which was dissolved in 1990, at which point Svijany became part of the state-owned breweries of Vratislavice nad Nisou. Later threatened with closure due to a sales crisis, Svijany was sold to the newly established Pivovar Svijany (Svijany Brewery Ltd.) in 1998. This was converted to a joint-stock company in 1992 and incorporated into Pražské Pivovary (Prague Breweries) in 1997. At that time Pražské Pivovary had come under control of the English brewer Bass company. In 2002, Pražské Pivovary became part of the Belgium-based Interbrew group, changing their name in 2003 from Pražské Pivovary to Pivovary Staropramen. In 2004, Interbrew merged with AmBev to form Inbev. In 2009, the private equity fund CVC Capital Partners bought all of Anheuser–Busch InBev's holdings in Central Europe, renaming the operation StarBev. In 2010, Svijany came under ownership of the Liberec Investment Fund, which bought 55% of the company's shares from StarBev and the remaining 45% from Pivovary Lobkowicz.

In September 2011, the brewery's Svijanská Kněžna (Duchess of Svijany) beer was the winner in the category of special semi-dark and dark beers, in the third annual contest of special and unusual beers at the Znojmo Grape 2011 gastronomic festival. Also in September 2011, Svijany's brewing expert Ladislav Černý and longtime brewery manager František Horák were inducted into the Czech Brewing and Malting Hall of Fame. In 2013, the brewery sued dTest, a consumer magazine, for publishing reports that claimed high levels of mould in one of its brews. The brewery argued additional testing found no increased levels, questioning the magazine's accuracy.

== See also ==
- Beer in the Czech Republic
