= ORER =

ORER may refer to:

- Orer (magazine) - An Armenian-European Magazine published in Prague, Czech Republic.
- Erbil International Airport - the main airport of Erbil in the Kurdistan Autonomous Region in northern Iraq.
