= Malý Újezd =

- Municipality
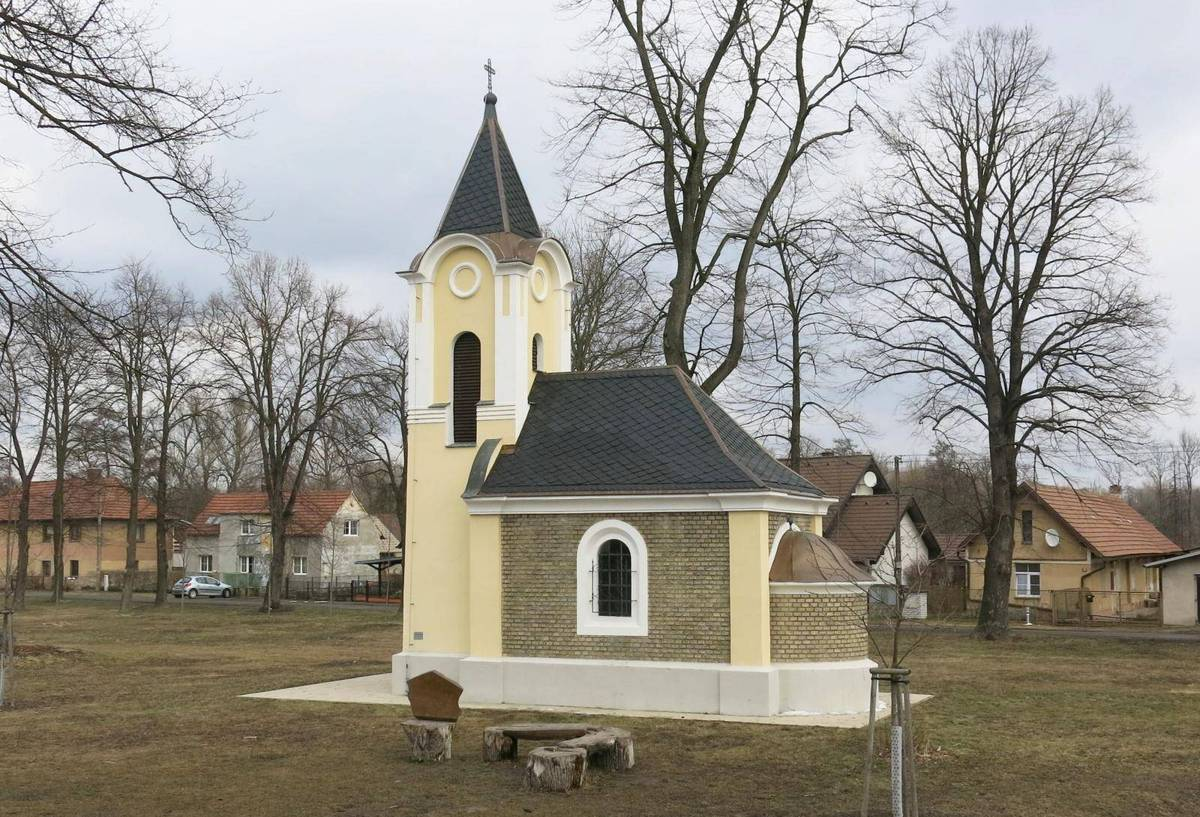
- Chapel in the centre of Malý Újezd

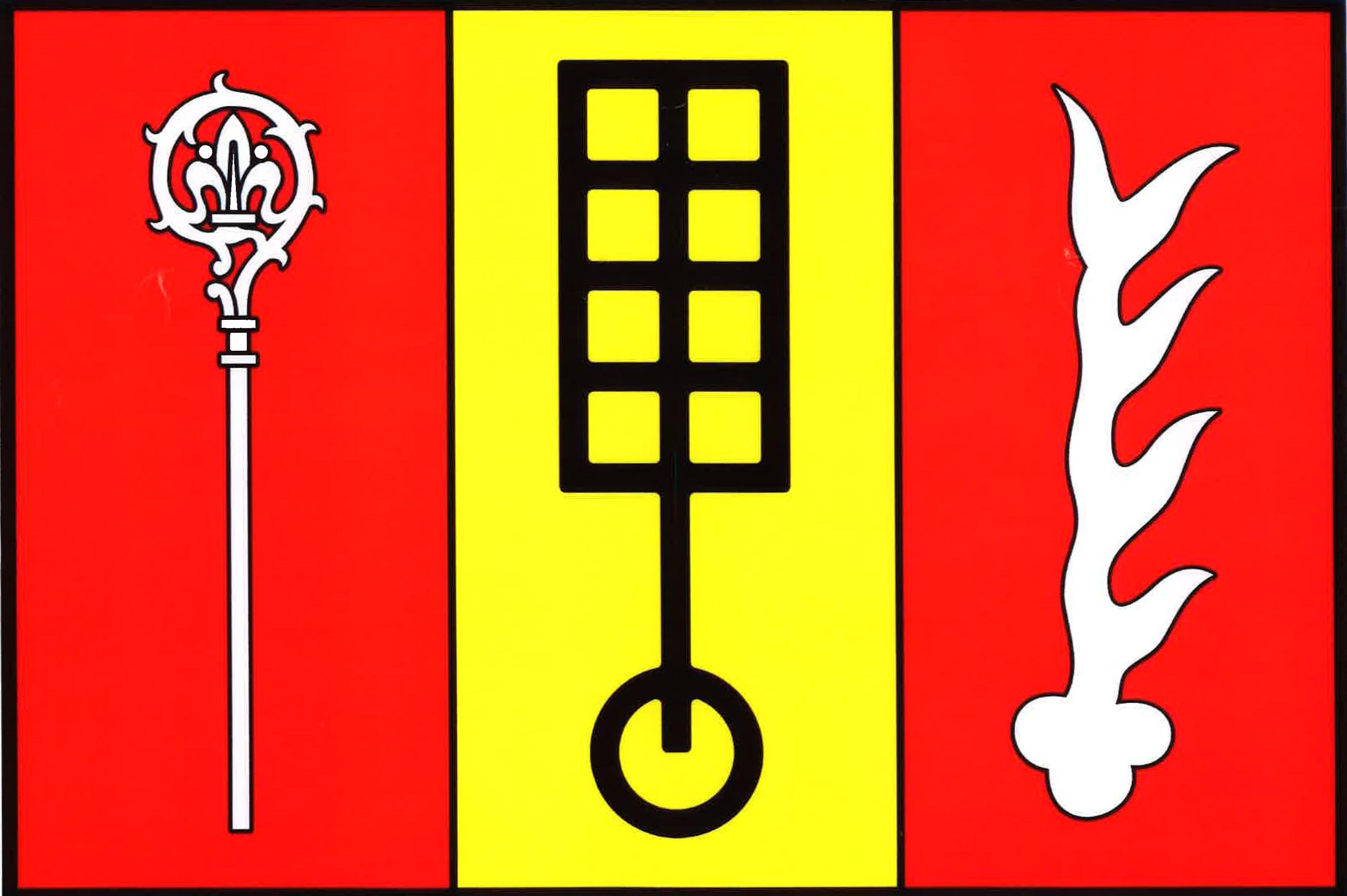
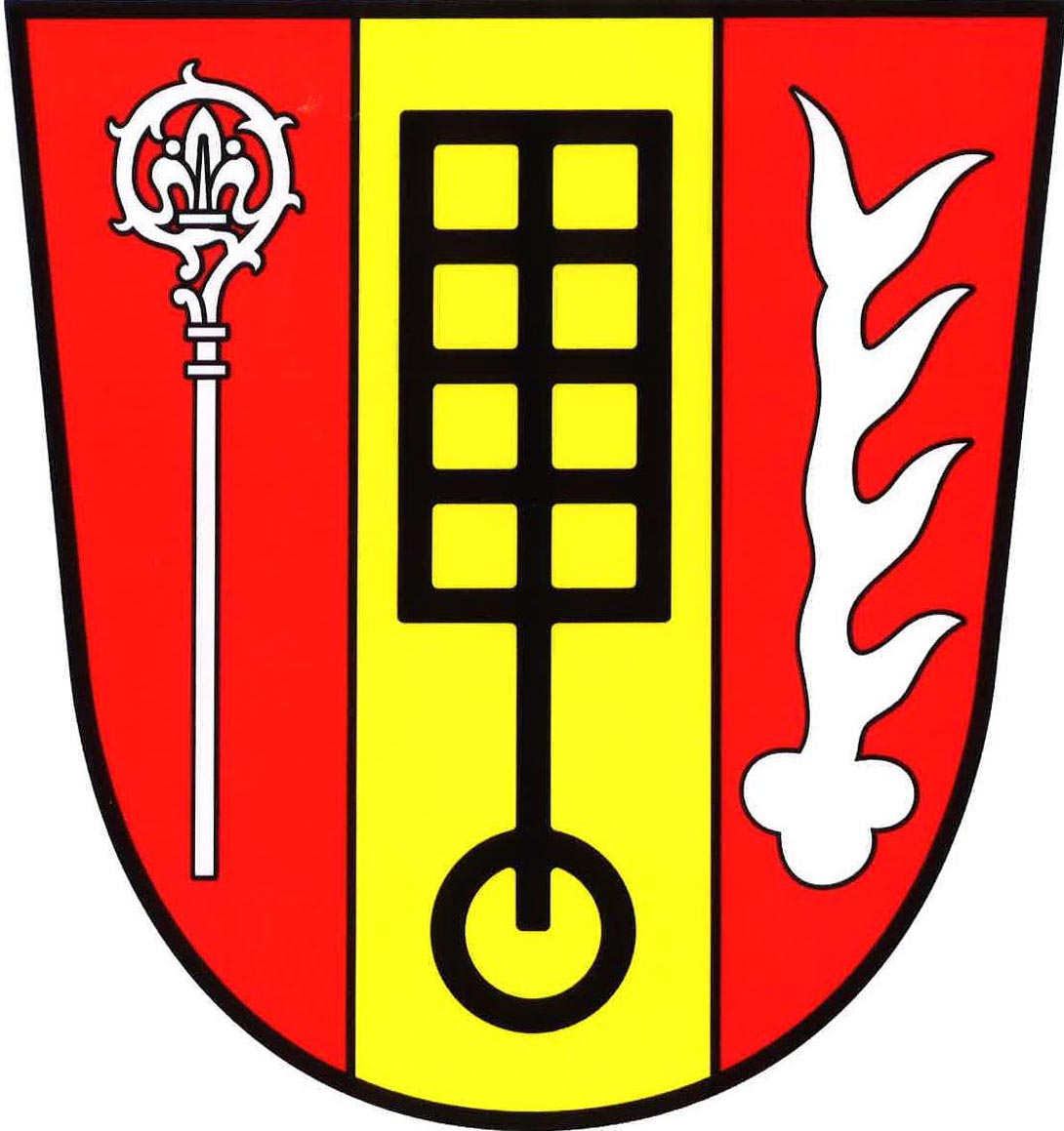
- Flag Coat of arms

- Location in the Czech Republic
- Coordinates: 50°19′57″N 14°31′47″E
- Country: Czech Republic
- Region: Central Bohemian
- District: Mělník
- First mentioned: 1517

Area
  - Total: 12.25 km^{2} (4.73 sq mi)
- Elevation: 193 m (633 ft)

Population (2026-01-01)
  - Total: 1,154
  - Density: 94.20/km^{2} (244.0/sq mi)
- Time zone: UTC+1 (CET)
  - Summer (DST): UTC+2 (CEST)
- Postal code: 277 31
- Website: www.malyujezd.cz

Malý Újezd is a municipality and village in Mělník District in the Central Bohemian Region of the Czech Republic. It has about 1,200 inhabitants.

== Administrative division ==
Malý Újezd consists of three municipal parts (in brackets population according to the 2021 census):

- Malý Újezd (351)
- Jelenice (291)
- Vavřineč (449)

== Etymology ==
The name means 'little Újezd' in Czech.

== Geography ==
Malý Újezd is located about 3 kilometres (2 mi) southeast of Mělník and 23 km (14 mi) north of Prague. It lies mostly in the Central Elbe Table, only the northeastern part of the municipality extends into the Jizera Table. The highest point is at 231 m (758 ft) above sea level. The Pšovka Stream flows along the northern municipal border.

== History ==
The first written mention of Malý Újezd is from 1517, when it was owned by the Mělník Chapter. Jelenice was first mentioned in 1361 and Vavřineč in 1545.

== Demographics ==
Historical population

Year	Pop.	±%
1869	528	—
1880	647	+22.5%
1890	683	+5.6%
1900	673	−1.5%
1910	790	+17.4%

Year	Pop.	±%
1921	838	+6.1%
1930	948	+13.1%
1950	734	−22.6%
1961	771	+5.0%
1970	726	−5.8%

Year	Pop.	±%
1980	727	+0.1%
1991	718	−1.2%
2001	789	+9.9%
2011	942	+19.4%
2021	1,091	+15.8%

Source: Censuses

== Transport ==
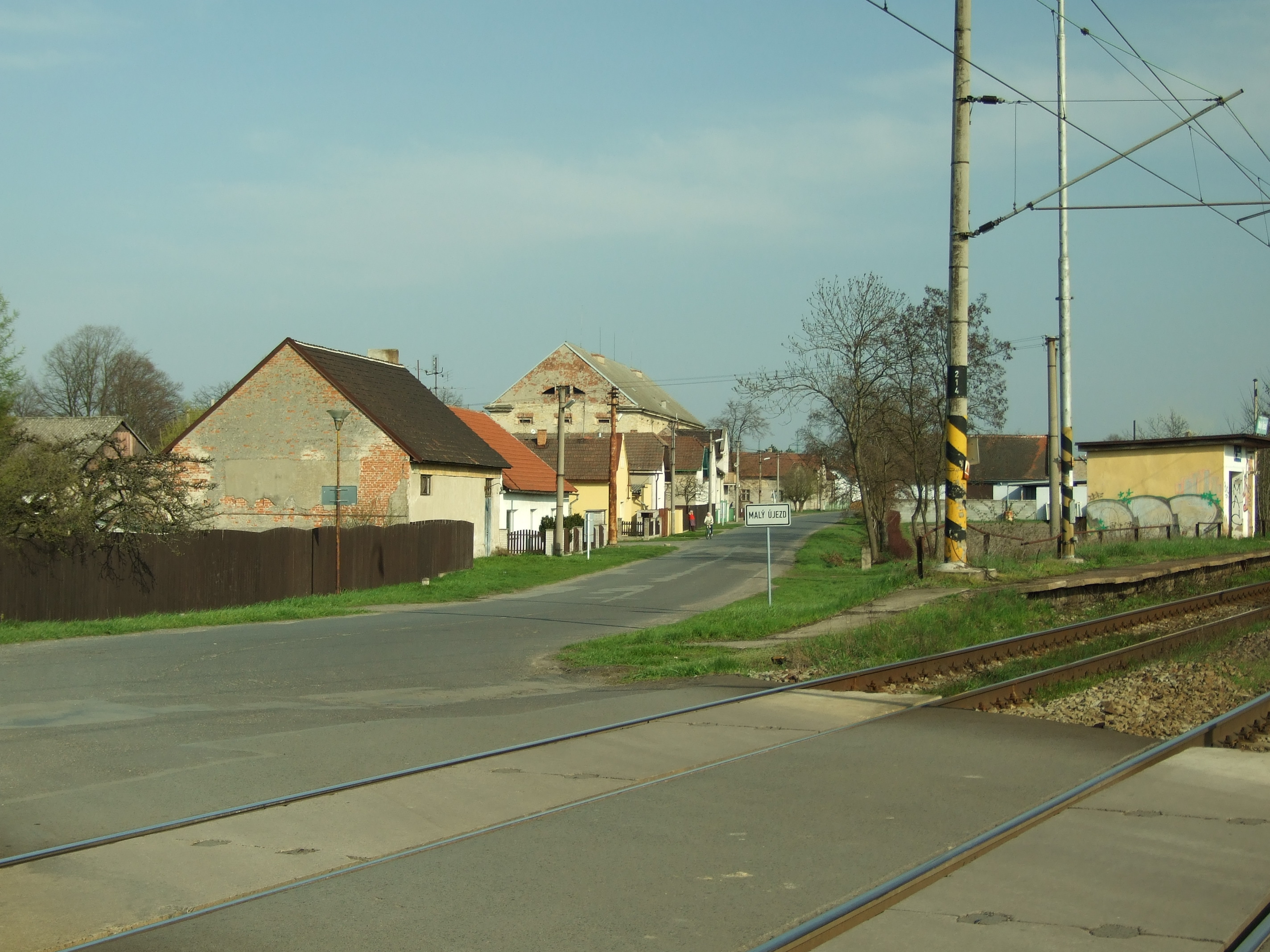
Entrance to Malý Újezd and train stop

The I/16 road, which connects the D10 motorway with Mělník, runs through the municipality.

Malý Újezd is located on the railway lines Prague–Mělník and Ústí nad Labem–Lysá nad Labem.

== Sights ==
There are no protected cultural monuments in the municipality.
