= Vollmann =

Vollmann is a surname. Notable people with the surname include:

- Korbinian Vollmann (born 1993), German footballer
- Peter Vollmann (born 1957), German footballer and manager
- William T. Vollmann (born 1959), American writer and journalist

== See also ==
- Mark Volman, American rock singer and guitarist
- Volkmann
