= Volkman =

Surname list

Volkman is a surname. Notable people with the surname include:

- Aja Volkman (born 1981), American musician
- Alisa Volkman (fl. 2000s), American online magazine co-founder (see Babble.com)
- Ed Volkman (fl. 2000s), American radio personality (see Eddie & JoBo)
- Eric Volkman (fl. 2000s), Czech financial magazine publisher (see Finance New Europe)
- Ernest Volkman (1940–2025), American journalist, author
- Harry Volkman (1926–2015), American meteorologist
- Karen Volkman (born 1967), American poet
- Ronald Volkman (born 2002), Australian rugby league footballer
- Kyle Volkman (fl. 2000s), American musician (see Shook Twins)

== See also ==
- Volkmann
