= Olgoi-Khorkhoi =

Olgoi-Khorkhoi could refer to:

- Olgoi-Khorkhoi, a local name for the cryptid Mongolian Death Worm.
- Olgoi-Khorkhoi, a short story by Ivan Yefremov.
