= Fantastická fakta =

Czech magazine

Fantastická fakta (Fantastic facts) is a Czech monthly paranormal magazine. It deals with unexplained phenomena, UFOs, and urban legends.

== History and profile ==
Fantastická fakta was first published in August 1997. The headquarters is in Prague. The magazine is published on a monthly basis. The launching editor-in-chief was Vladimír Mátl. Ivan Mackerle was the chief editor from 1998 to 2002.

== See also ==
- List of magazines in the Czech Republic
