= Armenians in the Czech Republic =

Czech Armenians
Total population
- 1,879 (2018)

Languages
- Armenian, Russian, Czech

Religion
- Christianity

Related ethnic groups
- Armenians, Czechs

Armenians in the Czech Republic (Armenian: Հայերը Չեխիայում, romanized: Hayery Ch'ekhiayum; Czech: Arménská menšina v Česku) are ethnic Armenians living in the modern Czech Republic. As of 2018, there were 1,879 Armenian citizen with a residence permit in the Czech Republic.

== History ==
Unlike Armenian communities throughout eastern and central Europe, the Armenian community of the Czech republic is made up entirely of recent immigrants, as there are no previous history of Armenian communities in the region. Most have come to the region after the dissolution of the Soviet Union, others fleeing poor economic conditions in the Armenian Republic.

The Armenian Community in the Czech Republic is still growing, as signified with the opening of an Armenian Saturday school in Prague in 1996, the establishment of an Armenian Cultural Center and the later establishment of the Orer (Օրեր) magazine (1999), edited by Hakob Asatryan, a former journalist for the Azg (Ազգ) paper in Yerevan who moved to Prague around 1998.

== Language ==
Armenian migrants freely speak the Russian language which was a subject needed at Czech schools until the end of the 1980s. This has had some impact on the language integration of the Armenian community. The knowledge of Russian may make it easier for Armenians to communicate with locals, and those of the older generation.

Level of Armenian migrants’ knowledge of the Czech language

High level	31%
Middle Level	42%
Low level	27%

== See also ==
- Armenia–Czech Republic relations
- Armenian diaspora
- Orer Armenian European Magazine - A bimonthly Armenian-European magazine published in Prague since 1999.

== Links ==
- CZECH ARMENIANS: A SMALL COMMUNITY WITH A STRONG POTENTIAL
