= Ivan Mackerle =

Czech cryptozoologist and explorer

- Born: 12 March 1942; Plzeň, Protectorate of Bohemia and Moravia
- Died: 3 January 2013 (aged 70); Prague, Czech Republic
- Years active: 40
- Spouse: Ivona Paličková
- Children: Danny Mackerle
- Parent: Father: Julius Mackerle

Ivan Mackerle (12 March 1942 – 3 January 2013) was a Czech cryptozoologist, author, design engineer and explorer. He organized expeditions to search for the Loch Ness monster of Scotland, the Tasmanian tiger in Australia, and the elephant bird in Madagascar. He was most notable for his search of the Mongolian death worm, and he conducted three trips to Mongolia in 1990, 1992, and 2004. He authored numerous books and publications and from 1998 until 2002 he was chief editor of the Czech paranormal magazine Fantastická fakta ("Fantastic Facts").

== Early life ==
Mackerle was born on 12 March 1943 in Plzeň in Protectorate of Bohemia and Moravia, the son of an automotive constructor. When he was three, the family moved to Kopřivnice. He spent his childhood in Plzeň. He developed a fascination with legendary creatures from a young age, especially the Mongolian death worm (Allghoi khorkhoi), and extensively read adventure books by Jaroslav Foglar, and the children's magazines Vpřed and Junák, illegal reading material under communist Czechoslovakia at the time. Other authors that influenced him were the Russian paleontologist and science fiction author Ivan Yefremov, and also Charles Fort, the American investigator of the "unexplained" who was nicknamed the “patron saint of cranks.”

Mackerle moved to Prague at the age of 16, where he attended the Czech Technical University in Prague, studying mechanical engineering, having already learned much about zoology and electronics. After graduation, Mackerle worked as a designer and was a director of an automobile firm before he decided to take up cryptozoology more seriously.

== Career ==
With former colleague Michal Brumlik he began investigating allegedly haunted castles throughout Czechoslovakia. For his expeditions, he purchased a German amphibious jeep (the Volkswagen 166 Schwimmwagen) dating from World War II and refitted it to suit his work. He used this vehicle for his explorations in Transylvania, in search of Count Dracula's castle. At 27, he made special efforts to get permission from the government of Czechoslovakia, at the time behind the Iron Curtain, to go Scotland to investigate the Loch Ness Monster. In his brief visit, he met another Loch Ness investigator, Robert H. Rines, and was impressed by his use of underwater photography and ultrasound. In the 1980s, he developed a reputation in Czechoslovakia for his lectures and audiovisual performances; of particular note was his Beautiful Mysteries of Our Planet. Sale of his popular book the Cesty za příšerami a dobrodružstvím ("Quests for Monsters and Adventure"), in addition to his lectures and columns in newspapers and journals, helped him to raise funds.

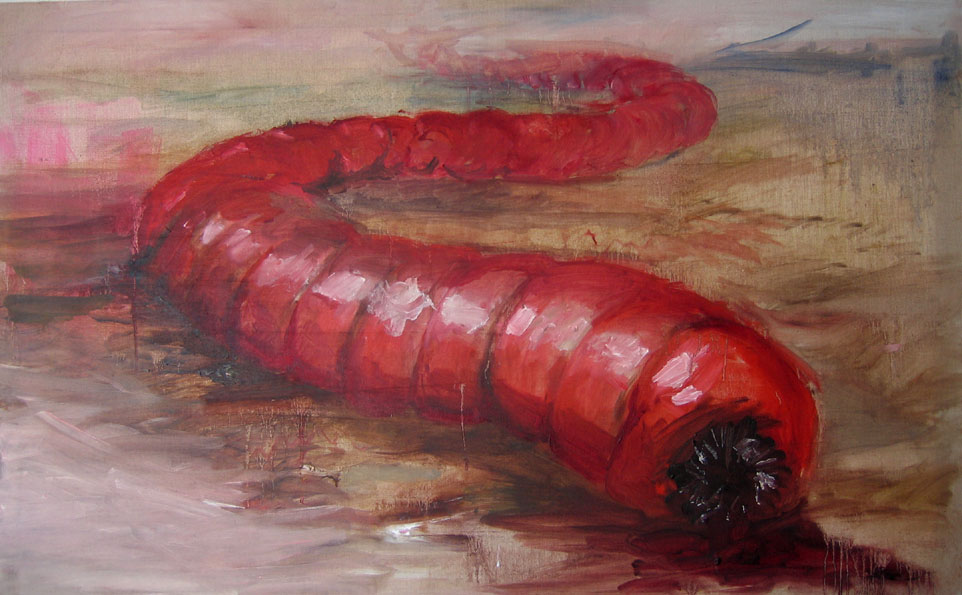
An interpretation of the Mongolian Death Worm

In 1989, Mackerle stood on Wenceslas Square with his friend Jiří Skupien, attending a big demonstration during the Velvet Revolution, and spoke of their desire to go to Mongolia; he made his first trip to Mongolia the following year in 1990. His team began an eight-week search for a large, lethal dark-red worm-like creature believed to inhabit the Gobi Desert, the Mongolian death worm. Mackerle believed that it resembled the amphisbaenian of South America. He described the animal from second-hand reports as a "sausage-like worm over half a metre (20 inches) long, and thick as a man's arm, resembling the intestine of cattle. Its tail is short, as [if] it were cut off, but not tapered. It is difficult to tell its head from its tail because it has no visible eyes, nostrils or mouth. Its colour is dark red, like blood or salami..."

He surmised that the worm extracted its venom from the goyo plant and was capable of delivering lethal electric shocks to its victims. In 1992, Mackerle made a second eight-week trip to Mongolia, during which he was warned at a Buddhist monastery that the worm was a creature of "supernatural evil" and that he was endangering his life searching for the creature. Mackerle recalls having a vivid dream about the worm, and states that he woke up with unexplained blood-filled boils on his back. He collected enough photographs, footage and data to make a documentary on his trips to Mongolia, broadcast on Czech television in 1993 as The Sand Monster Mystery.

Mackerle's expeditions also included a futile search for man-eating death blossoms in Madagascar and a scuba diving exploration off a Micronesian island in search of a mausoleum of platinum coffins. From 1998 to 2002 he was chief editor of the Czech magazine Fantastická fakta (Fantastic Facts), writing about strange phenomena and the paranormal. He was also a consultant for the TV series production titled Záhady a mystéria (Enigmas and mysteries), between 1998 and 2000.

In the early 2000s, he suffered from heart problems but recovered by 2004 and launched his third expedition to Mongolia in the late summer of that year. He scoured the desert with ultralight pilot Jiří Zítka, a video camera attached to the aircraft, but to no avail. He concluded that the creature was likely mythical, the figment of imagination or a "psychological problem" as he put it, brought about by the extreme heat of the desert.

== Personal life ==
He authored several books and was a long-term contributor to numerous magazines including the Fortean Times. In his spare time he was also interested in historical military vehicles.

At 20 he married Ivona Paličková, and they had a son, Danny. Dan had also joined his father in many expeditions in the amphibious Schwimmwagen.

== Death ==
Mackerle died on 3 January 2013, after a long illness. He was survived by his wife Ivona and son Dan.

== Bibliography ==
=== Films ===
Mackerle has directed the following movies for TV:

- Ivan Mackerle (1992). Záhada písečného netvora [The sand monster mystery] (in Czech). Czechoslovakia.
- Ivan Mackerle (2000). Tajemná Austrálie [Mysterious Australia] (in Czech). Czech Republic.
- Ivan Mackerle (2001). Mongolské záhady [Mongolian mystery] (in Czech). Czech Republic.
- Ivan Mackerle (2002). Ztracené město v Pacifiku [Lost City in the Pacific] (in Czech). Czech Republic.
- Ivan Mackerle (2006). Plavba do Údolí smrti [Voyage to the Valley of Death] (in Czech). Czech Republic.
- Ivan Mackerle (2007). Tajemná světla z Kumaonu [Mysterious lights of Kumaon] (in Czech). Czech Republic.
- Ivan Mackerle (2007). Skrytá tvář Srí Lanky [Hidden Face of Sri Lanka] (in Czech). Czech Republic.
- Ivan Mackerle (2009). Mato Grosso - brána do neznáma [Mato Grosso - Gateway to the Unknown] (in Czech). Czech Republic.

=== Articles ===
- — (December 2007). "Valley of Death". The Fortean Times. Archived from the original on 11 January 2013.
- — (April 2008). "Hunting for the Elephant Bird". Fate. Archived from the original on 31 December 2010.

=== Books ===
- — (1992). Tajemství pražského Golema [Secrets of the Golem of Prague] (in Czech). Magnet Press. ISBN 9788085434163.
- — (2001). Mongolské záhady [Mongolian mystery] (in Czech) (1st ed.). Praha: Ivo Železný. ISBN 9788024021676.
- — (2005). Cesty za příšerami a dobrodružstvím [Quests for Monsters and Adventure] (in Czech). Motto. ISBN 9788072462865.
- — (2011). Návrat nejistý - Po stopách největších záhad [Return uncertain - In the footsteps of the great mysteries] (in Czech). ISBN 978-80-7388-480-2.
