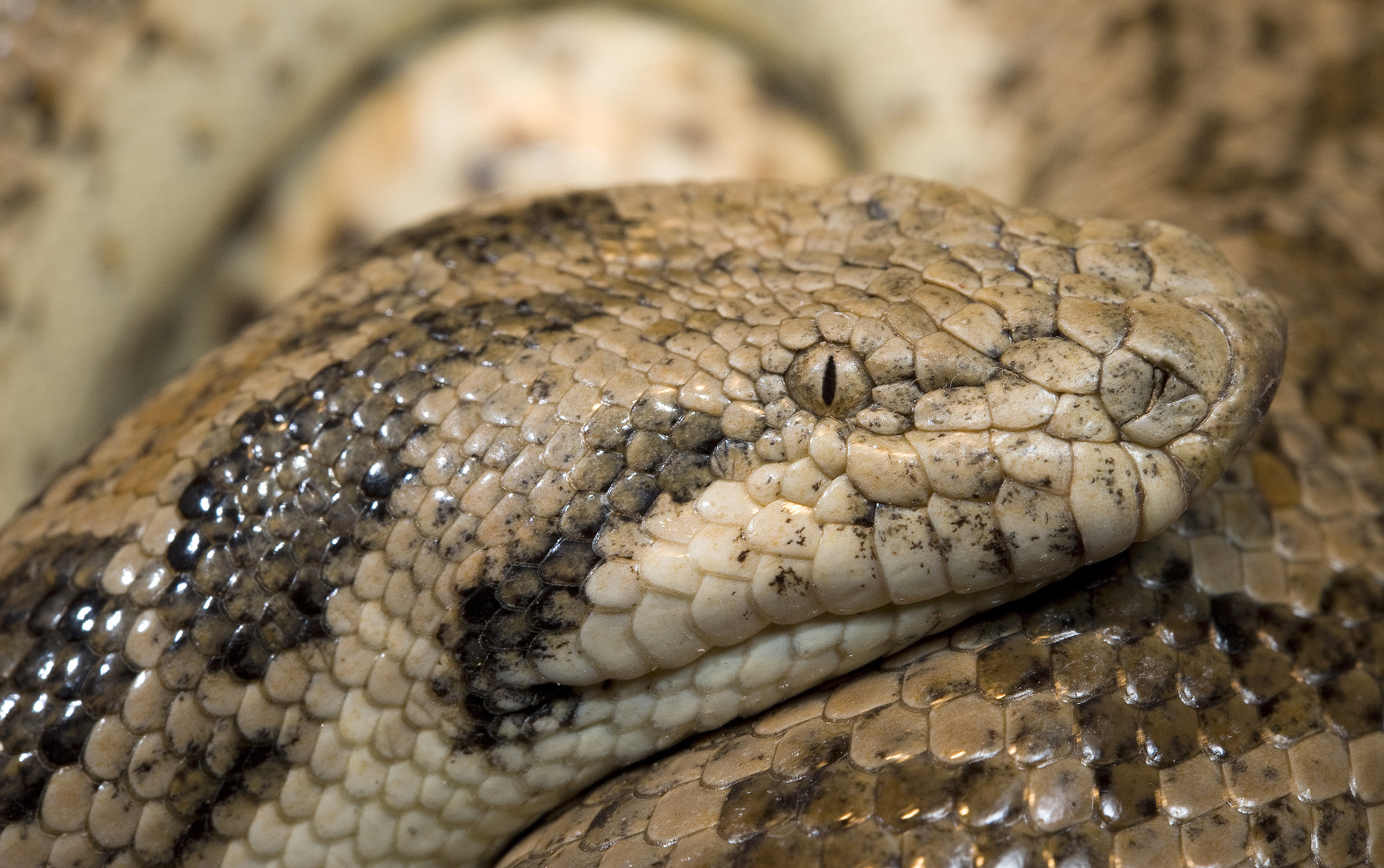
- Sand boa, Eryx miliaris (closeup of head).

Conservation status
- Least Concern (IUCN 3.1)

Scientific classification
- Kingdom: Animalia
- Phylum: Chordata
- Class: Reptilia
- Order: Squamata
- Suborder: Serpentes
- Family: Boidae
- Genus: Eryx
- Species: E. miliaris

Binomial name
- Eryx miliaris (Pallas, 1773)

Synonyms
- Anguis miliaris Pallas, 1773; Eryx miliaris — Eichwald, 1831; Eryx tataricus

= Eryx miliaris =

Species of snake, dwarf sand boa

Eryx miliaris, known as the dwarf sand boa, desert sand boa, and if formally synonymised with Eryx tataricus, as Tartar sand boa, is a widely distributed, largely Asian species of snake of the Boidae (boa, Erycidae) family. On behalf of the International Union for Conservation of Nature (IUCN), scientists assessed the populations of E. miliaris/tataricus across its range of habitats for the IUCN Red List of Threatened Species in April 2016, assigning them the status of "Least Concern".

The IUCN, the Reptile Database (RBD), and other contributing sources paint a relatively consistent picture of the distribution of these and other synonymous species, ranging from Iraq and Iran in the west, along the western shore of the Caspian Sea through all of central Asia, south into Afghanistan and Pakistan, and north and east into southern Russia, Mongolia, and Inner Mongolia in northern China.

The species may be the inspiration for a cryptid of legend, the Mongolian death worm.

== Description ==
=== Phylogeny, naming, synonymy ===
Eryx miliaris (deemed synonymous with E. tataricus based on mtDNA and morphologic analyses) is commonly known as the dwarf sand boa and desert sand boa (and via E. tataricus, the Tartar sand boa), and is a species of snake in the Boidae (Erycinae, Erycidae, boa) family. Formal subspecies—sometimes termed direct children—include E. miliaris miliaris [Pallas 1773] and E. miliaris nogaiorum [Nikolsky 1910]. Common names that E. miliaris is reportedly known by are the mountain sand boa, and various geographical names including Russian and Turkmen sand boas. As well, the various subspecies have sometimes been given distinct common names, e.f., E. miliaris nogaiorum as the black sand boa.

=== General physical description ===
The appearance of E. miliaris is described by WCH-University of Adelaide as usually having an adult length of 30 centimeters, extending to a maximum of approximately 90 centimeters.

Venchi and Sindaco (2006) suggest anatomical characteristics to differentiate E. miliaris from other Eryx species, specifically, that if a specimen is:

- "stout bodied, with [a] blunt tail..." [with] "widened ventral scales covering the central part of the belly only, the remaining belly surface covered with small and [un]differentiated scales as [seen for the dorsal scales...]", and if it has
- "eye[s] more or less developed, never covered by scales" and "ventral scales wider than long, very differentiated from all other scales...",

then it can be assigned to Family Boidae. Then, if the specimen has:

- an obtuse tail, and 4-9 scales between its eyes; and
- "3-4 post-internasal shields... 7-9 scales between [its] eyes... [and] 4-5 scales between nasals and the eyes",

then the species can be assigned as Eryx miliaris.

Other sources highlight that, as with most other sand boas, females are larger than males, and that E. tataricus (Tartar sand boa specimens) are the larger variants (the comparison presuming the E. miliaris-E. tataricus synonymy); these sources note that adult Tartar sand boa males rarely reach 75 centimeters in length, while adult females can reach 120 centimeters.

E. miliaris, per se, is reliably described as being, relative to other snakes:

Small in length, [and] cylindrical... [a] stout bodied snake with a very short blunt tail... [Its h]ead is indistinct from [its] neck. [Its s]nout is rounded when viewed from above and pointed and projecting when viewed from the side. [Its e]yes are small in size, located dorsally with vertically elliptical pupils. [Its d]orsal scales are smooth to weakly keeled.

Its body has also been described as strong and round, and its tail as thick. With regard to the coloration of its scales, E. miliaris is presented as a mixture of brown, red and black, which turns white on both sides.

=== Behaviour ===
==== Activity, diet ====
The WCH-University of Adelaide describe E. miliaris as "[t]errestrial and mainly diurnal... with nocturnal tendencies in [its habitat's] hottest months". The IUCN description of the species, which specifically refers to E. miliaris (distinctly, from E. tataricus and E. speciosus), presents it as "nocturnal during the hot part of the year", indicates that it is "common on the surface in spring", and states that it is active from "March to October over most of its range" (and the more proscribed April to September in Kazakhstan and the eastern Ciscaucasia).

With regard to its diet and prey, the WCH-University of Adelaide describes E. miliaris as feeding "mainly on rodents and lizards". Elsewhere its prey have been described as including small birds, desert lizards, and other small animals.

==== Reproductive (viviparity) ====
E. miliaris is described as being viviparous in an IUCN description, and as ovoviparous by Peter Uetz and Jakob Hallermann at the Reptile Database. D.G. Blackburn of Trinity College has noted that this term has been used discrepantly in the herpetology literature, arguing that use of the term be avoided "in favour of unambiguous alternatives that explicitly distinguish patterns defined on the basis of reproductive products at deposition from patterns based on sources of nutrients for embryonic development" [italics added].

In the case of genus Eryx, and restricting use of terminology to the simple oviparous reproduction for egg-laying cases and viviparous reproduction for live-bearing cases (as these are applied in discussions of the presence or absence of egg-laying behaviour in Eryx species), Eryx is described as a genus as being viviparous (bearing young live), with the exception of species Eryx jayakari (and, by association, Eryx muelleri, both characterised as egg-laying); this analysis and generalisation places the titular subject, Eryx miliaris in the category of viviparous.

The IUCN—again limiting its description just to the dwarf/desert sand boa (E. miliaris, and not the synonymous species presented by the RDB)—describes the viviparity of the species as having females giving birth in July-August (without any geographical qualification), in numbers in the range of 4 to 15 young. The Tartar sand boa has also been described as viviparous, with the female giving birth to 7-10 young.

==== Other behaviours ====
E. miliaris has been compared to the Indian sand boa for its behaviour of rounding its body when threatened.

== Habitat, distribution, threat status ==
In the geographic regions Eryx miliaris occupies, the WCH-University of Adelaide describes it being found at "[e]levations up to about 2700 met[ers above mean sea level], mainly in arid and semi-arid sandy regions with bush vegetation" but that it will also "tolerate harder soils and rocky slope terrain". The International Union for Conservation of Nature (IUCN) describes it as occupying elevations from sea level to approximately 1200 meters above it. With regard to the IUCN's observed species in Mongolia referred to as E. tataricus—see earlier Reptile Database (RDB) statements on the synonymy of species E. miliaris, E. tataricus, etc.—E. tataricus was observed to occupy elevations from 80 to 1600 meters above sea level; and the IUCN's putative subspecies referred to as E. tataricus vittatus, from 700 to 1400 meters above it.

The RDB describes the geographic range of E. miliaris, per se, as being:

- throughout Iraq;
- throughout Kazakhstan, Uzbekistan, Turkmenistan, and Afghanistan;
- in southern Russia, from the Caspian Sea to its border with Kazakhstan;
- in China, from Xinjiang, through Gansu and Ningxia to Inner Mongolia; and in
- Mongolia itself.

The RDB further presents E. miliaris nogaiorum. a subspecies (alongside E. miliaris miliaris), as being found in the Nogai [Nogay] Steppe area of Russian Chechnya, between the Terek and Kuma rivers, based on an early 20th century source (Nikolsky).

The IUCN description of E. miliaris' range presents the same information as bulleted for the RDB above, regarding China (from the same sources), likewise for Afghanistan and the three Central Asian nations (Kazakhstan, Uzbekistan, and Turkmenistan). For Russia it describes the range as being the eastern Ciscaucasia, including in Chechnya, Dagestan, and Kalmykia, and it omits Iraq but adds northern Iran. Finally, with regard to Mongolia, it states as uncertain the presence of E. miliaris there (noting conflicting literatures), and refers instead to an "Eryx miliaris-tataricus complex", noting that "many authors attribute all Mongolian records [of identified Eryx species] to E. tartaricus" (the RDB-stated E. miliaris synonym).

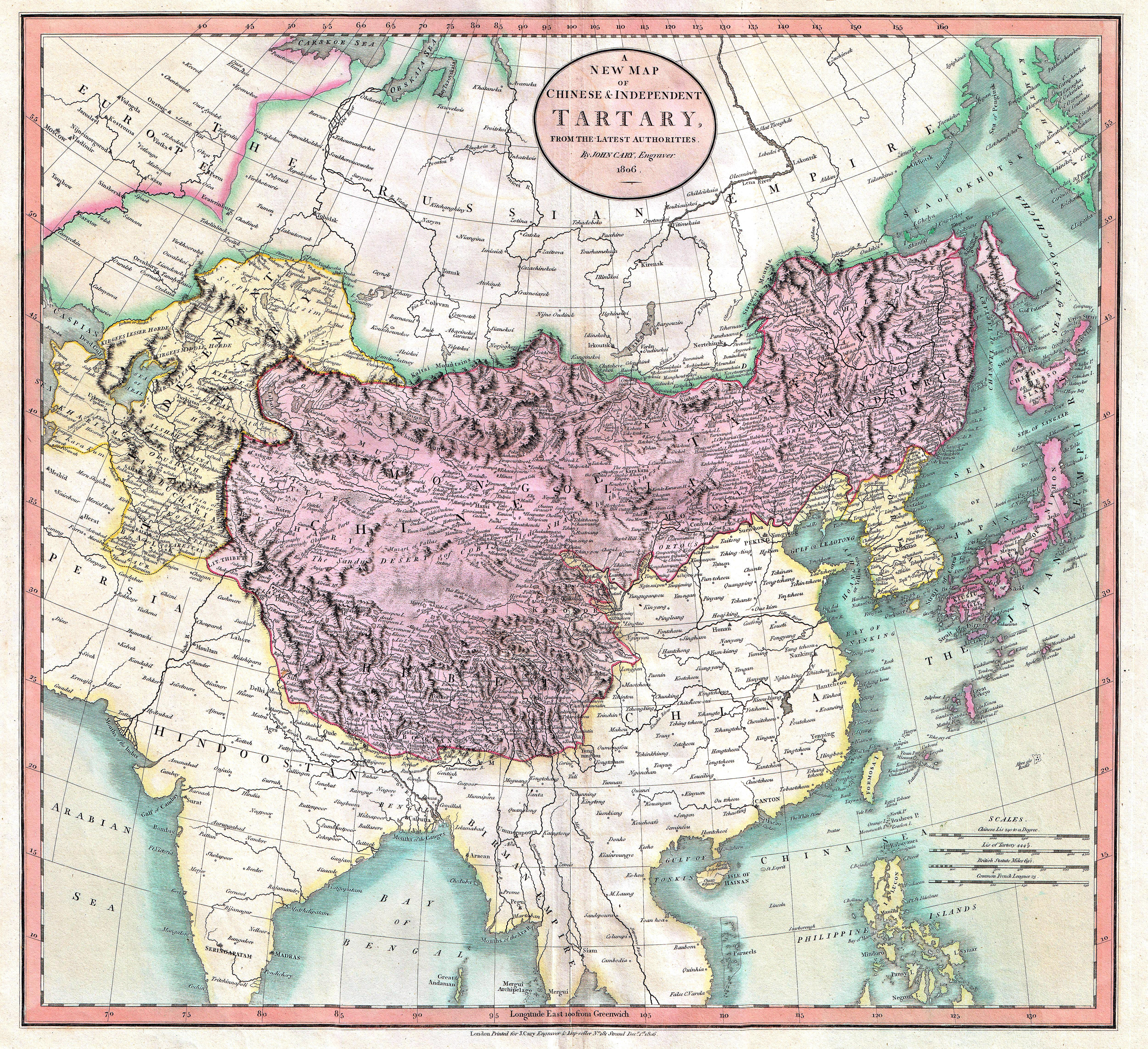
Cary's 1808 map of independent Tartary (in yellow) and Chinese Tartary (in violet).

The RDB then presents the range of the synonymous E. tataricus (whose species name it indicates is "invalid"), as overlapping with that described for E. miliaris, specifically,

- from Iran, through western Pakistan into Afghanistan, Tajikistan, and Kyrgyzstan;
- into eastern Kazakhstan, and Uzbekistan, and eastern Turkmenistan;
- into the areas in China identical to E. miliaris (based on same original source); and in
- southern Mongolia.

[The RDB describes the locality for this Eryx species as "Tataria" (Tatary, Tartary).]

The IUCN description of E. tataricus' range presents its distribution in southern Mongolia and China identically to that of the RDB, citing the same sources. It likewise presents its range as extending from Iran, although qualified, stating northern and central. In summary, like the RDB, it mentions the range extending south through Afghanistan into Pakistan (specifically, "northwestern Baluchistan" province), and to all five central Asian nations (but without designating smaller parts thereof)—with Iran and these having the Caspian Sea as a boundary.

Finally, the RDB presents E. speciosus, a species it describes as synonymous with E. tataricus (speciosus being another name it indicates is "invalid"), as having a range overlapping with E. tataricus—in Pakistan and Tajikistan (the latter, refining it to the Vakhsh River valley). The IUCN, on the other hand, presents E. speciosus as a subspecies of E. tataricus (i.e., as "restricted-range subspecies E. tataricus speciosus"), and states a range limited to Tajikistan (and there, to perhaps 200 km^{2}).

Somewhat conflictingly overall, distribution information is summarised by the Integrated Taxonomic Information System (ITIS), which assigns E. miliaris to the geographic divisions of Southern Asia, Europe, and Northern Asia (excluding China).

=== Species threat status ===
Eryx miliaris was assessed in April 2016, for The IUCN Red List of Threatened Species, and assigned the status of "Least Concern", likewise for E. tataricus (wherein this authority excludes specific report regarding E. speciosus).

== Popular culture ==
The Eryx miliaris species present in Mongolia, referred via the synonym Eryx tataricus, may be the inspiration for a legendary cryptid, the Mongolian death worm. A specimen described as E. tataricus was shown to inhabitants of the Gobi Desert in Mongolia, who claimed to have seen that cryptid, locally referred to as "olgoi-khorkhoi" ("large intestine worm"), and stated it to be the same animal.

== Notes ==
a: E. tataricus synonymy. The RDB, Uetz & Hallermann (2025), op. cit., states that

[Reynolds & Henderson 2018] consider [E.] tataricus as questionable and [E.] speciosus as synonym of [E.] tataricus. Reynolds et al. (2014) found that E. tataricus nests within E. miliaris and [E. tataricus] was considered a synonym of [E.] miliaris by [Eskandarzadeh et al. (2013)], and formally synonymised by [Eskandarzadeh et al. (2020)]. [See Uetz & Hallermann (2025), RDB, op. cit.]

Hence, Uetz & Hallermann conclude that E. miliaris and E. tataricus are synonyms (i.e., are the same species), based on Eskandarzadeh et al. (2020) and the preponderance of earlier perspectives.

b: Central Asian countries. As listed from the RDB, Uetz & Hallermann (2025), op. cit., these are Kazakhstan, Kyrgyzstan, Tajikistan, Turkmenistan, and Uzbekistan (though differently divided/ordered where this source is cited, in the "Distribution..." section). See also IUCN Staff (11 April 2025), "Tartar Sand Boa: Eryx tataricus—Text Overview", op. cit.

c: For a full discussion, see the "Distribution..." section below, and the International Union for Conservation of Nature (IUCN), Reptile Database (RDB), etc. sources cited therein.

d: Venchi & Sindaco (2006) on tail differentiation. These authors state the foregoing, in distinction to the specimen having a conical, pointed tail that "ends in a conical scale, and [that] has 11-15 scales between eyes... and its head covered with very small scales", which together instead characterise species Gongylophis colubrinus, see Venchi & Sindaco (2006), op. cit., p. 318.

e: Head scales are also referred to as plates or shields., see Greene (1997), op. cit., p. 22. To further understand the Venchi & Sindaco (2006) description of tests to anatomically differentiate genus Eryx from other genera, the following explanation regarding the nomenclature of head scales may serve as a starting point [italics added]:

Boas, pythons, and many vipers have small, irregularly arranged head scales, in contrast to the large, symmetrical head scales... of most advanced snakes. Moving from front to back over the head, these large scales are the rostral (covering the snout), internasals (usually paired, behind the rostral), prefrontals (usually paired, behind the internasals), supraoculars (often fragmented, just over the eyes), frontal (between the supraoculars), and parietals (paired, behind the frontal). Supralabial (upper) and infralabial (lower) lip scales border the mouth... on each side. Behind each nasal scale (including or adjacent to the nostril) are loreal or preocular scales, or both, and behind each eye, between the supralabials and parietals, are postocular and temporal scales. On the underside of the head, an anterior mental scale generally is followed by large, paired chin shields and smaller gular scales. Most snakes have a longitudinal mental groove between the rows of chin scales... [Greene (1997), op. cit., p. 22.]

f: Blackburn (1994) on discrepant ovoviparity literature. Blackburn notes that the

chief feature that these patterns [in the discrepant literature use of ovoviparous] have in common is that [they represent that] eggs begin to develop in some sort of association with one of the parents; however, the nature and duration of this association varies, as does the parent with which the association occurs... [Blackburn (1994), op. cit.]

He further notes that the term has been used to "represent at least five distinct reproductive patterns" that might have been "more clearly... referred to as aplacental viviparity, oviparous egg-retention, egg-tending, pseudoviviparity, and lecithotrophy", the relationships of which to the case of Eryx are not established by this source.

g: Lynch & Wagner (2009) on Eryx viviparity ancestry. As these authors state, op. cit., their phylogenetic analysis—"of boid snakes based on a concatenated multigene study of all genera of erycines, New and Old World boines"—presents results that argue for the "strong probability that the ancestor of this clade was viviparous" and that in cases where egg-laying is observed, e.g., in the case of E. jayakari, that their "data strongly support the conclusion that [the far less representative case] oviparity... re[-]evolved" (p. 6, op. cit.). The authors go on to note that "[u]nlike all other oviparous snakes", E. jayakari retains similarity to its viviparous relations (other boids) in that they likewise do not have an egg-tooth (which most oviparous snakes have to aid unhatched progeny emerge from their eggs; p. 7, op. cit.). E. jayakari shares its lack of this anatomical feature with E. muelleri, which is likewise believed to have derived from a viviparous (live young-bearing) ancestor, and to have re-evolved its oviparous characteristic (bearing young via egg-laying; p. 7, op. cit.). Lynch & Wagner (2009) conclude that "viviparity is reversible and oviparity has re[-]evolved in Eryx jayakari" (p. 1,5, op. cit.).

h: That is, exclusive of their stated synonymous species, E. tataricus and E. speciosus; see the trio of references given regarding "the synonymy of species" immediately above.

i: IUCN bounds to E. tataricus' range. The IUCN bounds its range in Iran by the two qualifiers presented in the text. It also explicitly mentions the Central, Zanjhan, East and West Azarbaijan, Khuzistan, and Khorasan Provinces (but suggests for the Khorasan that data for E. tataricus and E. miliaris are confounded), see IUCN Staff (11 April 2025), "Tartar Sand Boa: Eryx tataricus—Text Overview", op. cit. It goes on to describe, somewhat discrepantly, the habitats in Iran of E. tataricus as deserts and plains of north, east, northeast, and central Iran; foothills south of the Alborz mountains; desert on the central Iranian Plateau in Isfahan province; and forest of Golestan province; see IUCN Staff (ibid.).
