= Volkmann =

Volkmann is a German surname. Notable people with the surname include:

- Alfred Wilhelm Volkmann (1801–1877), German physiologist
- Elisabeth Volkmann (1936–2006), German actress
- Jens Volkmann (born 1967), German middle-distance runner
- John Volkmann (1905–1980), American scientist
- Johannes Volkmann (born 1996), German politician
- Paul Oskar Eduard Volkmann (1856–1938), German physicist and philosopher
- Richard von Volkmann (1830–1889), German surgeon
- Robert Volkmann (1815–1883), German composer

== See also ==
- Volkmann's contracture, a disease causing stiffness of the hand
- Volkmann's fracture, a type of bone fracture of the fibula
- Volkmann's canals, microscopic structures in animal bone
- Volkman
