= Svijany =

- Municipality
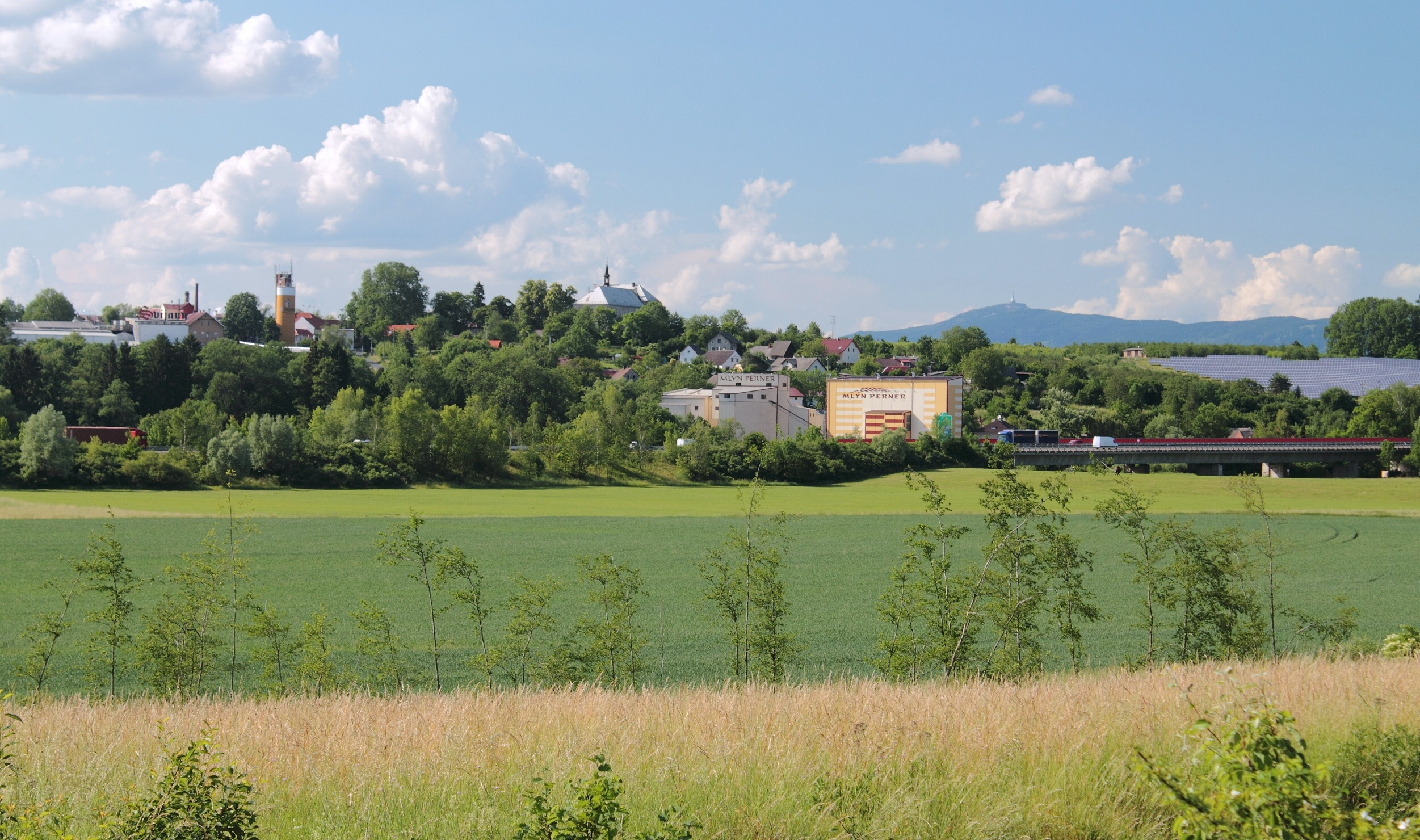
- General view

- Flag Coat of arms

- Location in the Czech Republic
- Coordinates: 50°34′21″N 15°3′25″E
- Country: Czech Republic
- Region: Liberec
- District: Liberec
- First mentioned: 1345

Area
  - Total: 2.70 km^{2} (1.04 sq mi)
- Elevation: 255 m (837 ft)

Population (2026-01-01)
  - Total: 373
  - Density: 138/km^{2} (358/sq mi)
- Time zone: UTC+1 (CET)
  - Summer (DST): UTC+2 (CEST)
- Postal code: 463 46
- Website: www.obecsvijany.cz

Svijany (Czech pronunciation: [ˈsvɪjanɪ]) is a municipality and village in Liberec District in the Liberec Region of the Czech Republic. It has about 400 inhabitants. It is known for the Svijany Brewery.

== Etymology ==
The initial name of the village was Sviňany. The name was derived either from the Czech word svině (i.e. 'swine'), which would mean that swines were raised here, or from the personal name Sviňa. In the 17th century, the name changed to Svijany.

== Geography ==
Svijany is located about 20 kilometres (12 mi) south of Liberec. It lies in the Jičín Uplands. The highest point is at 269 m (883 ft) above sea level. The municipality is situated on the right bank of the Jizera River, which forms the southern municipal border.

== History ==
The first written mention of Svijany is from 1345, when the village was owned by a Cistercian monastery in Mnichovo Hradiště. In 1565, Svijany was acquired by Jaroslav of Wartenberg, who had built a Renaissance castle here. Upon Jaroslav's death in 1602, the village passed to Joachim Andreas von Schlick. As a rebel against Habsburg rule of Bohemia, he was executed in 1621, and in 1623, Svijany came under control of Albrecht of Wallenstein. His family owned Svijany until 1814. From 1820, the village was in possession of the Rohan family, who were its last aristocratic owners.

In 1945, the castle and the brewery were confiscated and nationalised. The castle was rebuilt into apartments and gradually fell into disrepair.

== Demographics ==
Historical population

Year	Pop.	±%
1869	532	—
1880	544	+2.3%
1890	516	−5.1%
1900	526	+1.9%
1910	501	−4.8%

Year	Pop.	±%
1921	444	−11.4%
1930	432	−2.7%
1950	326	−24.5%
1961	355	+8.9%
1970	340	−4.2%

Year	Pop.	±%
1980	365	+7.4%
1991	279	−23.6%
2001	281	+0.7%
2011	291	+3.6%
2021	361	+24.1%

Source: Censuses

== Economy ==
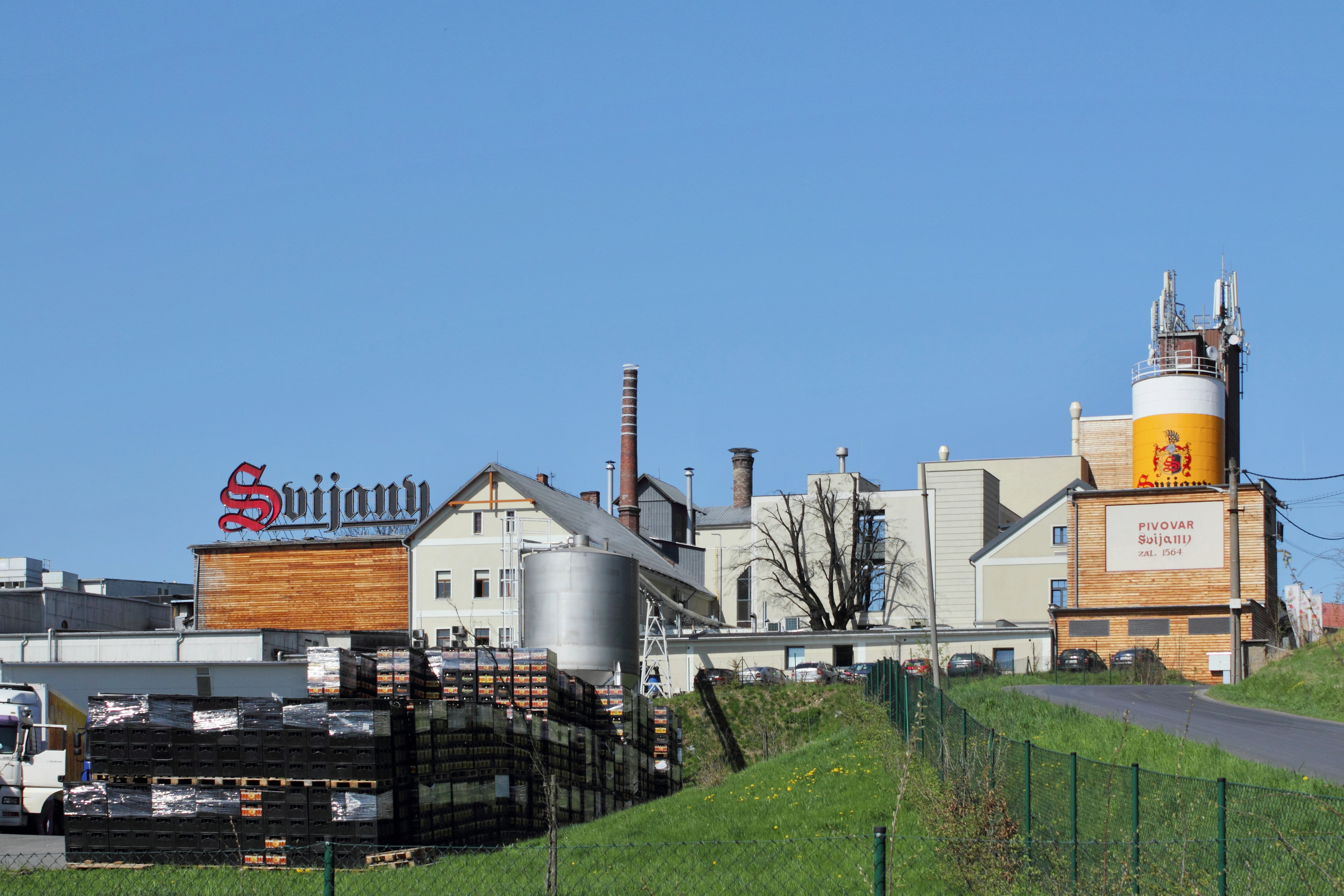
Svijany Brewery

Svijany is known for the Svijany Brewery, which was founded in 1564. It is one of the oldest continuously operating breweries in the Czech Republic.

== Transport ==
The D10 motorway from Prague to Turnov runs through Svijany.

== Sights ==
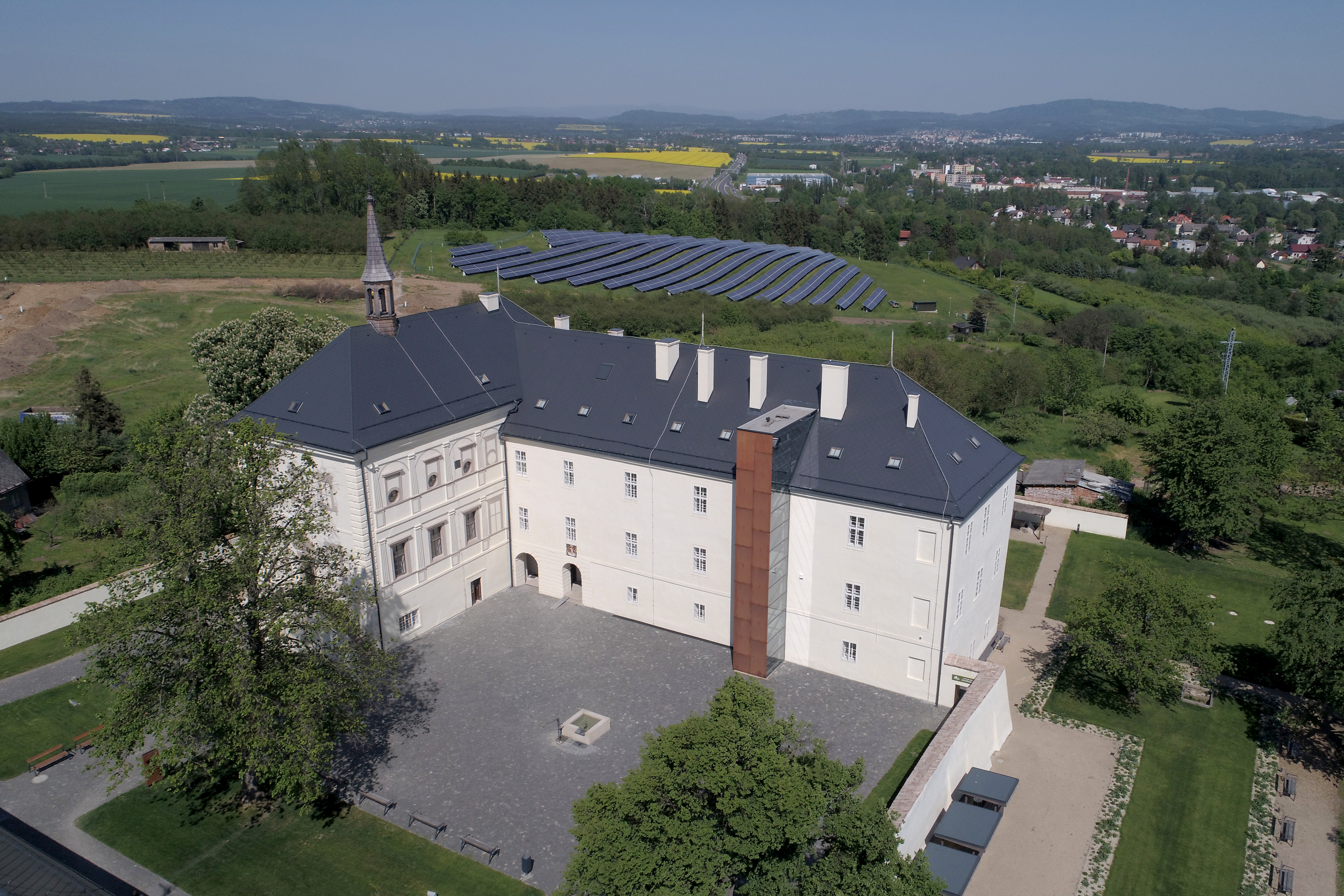
Svijany Castle

The most notable monument is the Svijany Castle. It was built in 1578, and rebuilt and extended during the rule of the Waldstein family. Since 1998, the castle has been owned by the brewery, which had reconstructed it. Today the castle is open to the public, contains several exhibitions, and is also used as a hotel and restaurant.
