= Svět sovětů =

Propaganda magazine in Prague (1932–1968)

- Categories: Propaganda magazine
- Frequency: Weekly
- Founder: Union of Czechoslovak-Soviet Friendship
- Founded: 1932
- Final issue: 1968
- Based in: Prague
- Language: Czech

Svět sovětů (Czech: The World of the Soviets) was an illustrated magazine published in Prague between 1932 and 1968. It is known as a propaganda magazine supporting close relations with the Soviet Union.

== History and profile ==
Svět sovětů was established by the Union of Czechoslovak-Soviet Friendship in 1932. The goal of the magazine was to reinforce friendship between Soviet and Czech citizens. It frequently contained propaganda material supporting the Soviet government. It was published on a weekly basis in Prague. Its subtitle was Illustrated weekly of friends of the USSR after 1945. In the late 1950s the magazine was redesigned, and its format was enlarged. It also began to cover more color photographs.

The circulation of Svět sovětů was around 3,000 copies in 1967. The magazine ceased publication in 1968.
