= ZX Magazín =

Czech magazine

- June 1993 cover
- Categories: Computer magazine
- First issue: 1988
- Final issue: 2005
- Country: Czech Republic
- Language: Czech
- ISSN: 1210-4833

ZX Magazín was a Czech magazine for users of home computers ZX Spectrum, Didaktik, Delta, SAM Coupé and compatible computers. It was published from 1988 to 2005. It was published by different companies. When its publisher was the company Proxima - Software, the magazine was issued bimonthly.

== Magazine content ==
The magazine was not oriented only to computer games, the game topics was only about one-third of the whole content. The other topics that the magazine was focused to were the manuals to user programs and utilities, hardware description (either own ZX Spectrum hardware, either peripherals), courses of programming, introduction to electronics. Some issues contains reportages from actions organized by ZX Spectrum community and interviews with authors of ZX Spectrum programs.

As a speciality, the magazine Intro was put at the last page of the magazine.

== Magazine issuers ==
- 1988 – 1991 – David Hertl
- 1992 – 1994 – Proxima - Software,
- 1995 – 1997 – Zbyněk Vanžura (Heptau) (Note: No issue was published in 1997)
- 1998 – 2005 – Matěj Kryndler (Matsoft).

The ISSN 1210-4833 was given to the magazine in 1993. (Note: magazine could have given ISSN sooner, but it is printed in the magazine since 1993. Since 1998, it is not printed in the magazine.) (Note: According to WorldCat, ISSN was given to the journal only until 1996.)
