= Orer =

Orer Armenian European Magazine Օրեր համաեվրոպական անկախ ամսագիր
- Issue No. 7-9/65/2012
- Editor: Hakob Asatryan
- Categories: News magazine
- Frequency: Bimonthly
- Publisher: Information Centre Caucasus-Eastern Europe
- First issue: September 1999
- Company: Orer Armenian European Magazine
- Country: Czech Republic
- Based in: Prague
- Language: Armenian, Czech, English
- Website: Orer.eu

Orer, Armenian European Independent Magazine (Armenian: Օրեր Համաեվրոպական անկախ ամսագիր) was established in September 1999 in Prague. The publisher is the Information Centre Caucasus-Eastern Europe, an international non-governmental organisation with the editor-in-chief Hakob Asatryan. The bimonthly magazine not only covers the life of Armenians living in the Czech Republic, but also the community life, sports, cultural, and political life of Armenians throughout more than 30 European countries as well as ongoing events in Armenia.

ORER (Armenian: Օրեր - Days) highlights Armenian-European relations & bilateral diplomatic and political ties. Czech-Armenian projects, economic cooperation are widely covered, interviews with Czech famous people, government officials and public figures. Pages are devoted to the art and important cultural events taking place in Armenia & in Europe as well as new books published, Armenian and foreign artists, musicians & writers. Sports articles are released giving information on the accomplishments and achievements of Armenian athletes.

ORER is distributed in 25 countries of Europe; the Czech Republic, Germany, Poland, Hungary, Slovakia, Italy, Greece, France, Russia, the United Kingdom, Sweden, Switzerland, Spain, Cyprus, the Netherlands, Belgium and others.

ORER Armenian European Magazine Issues

Orer Armenian European Magazine, Issue no. 5-6/64/2012 - Special Issue devoted to 500th Anniversary of Armenian Typography

Orer Armenian European Magazine, Issue no. 3-4/63/2012 - Special Issue devoted to Czech Armenian Relations

Orer Armenian European Magazine, Issue no. 3-4/57/2011 - Special Issue devoted to Art

== See also ==
- List of magazines in the Czech Republic
