= Mongolian death worm =

Legendary cryptid in the Gobi Desert

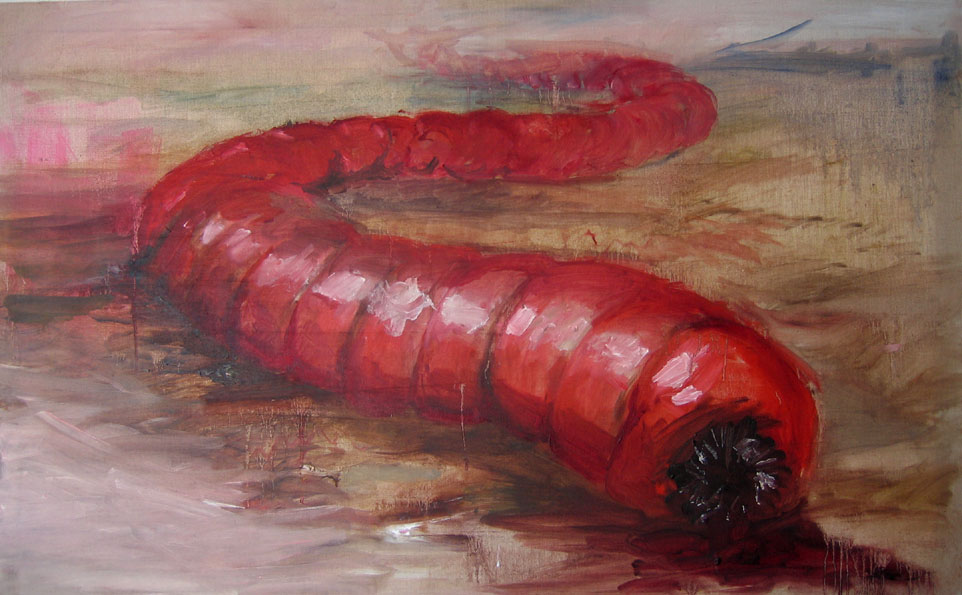
An interpretation of the Mongolian death worm by Belgian painter Pieter Dirkx.

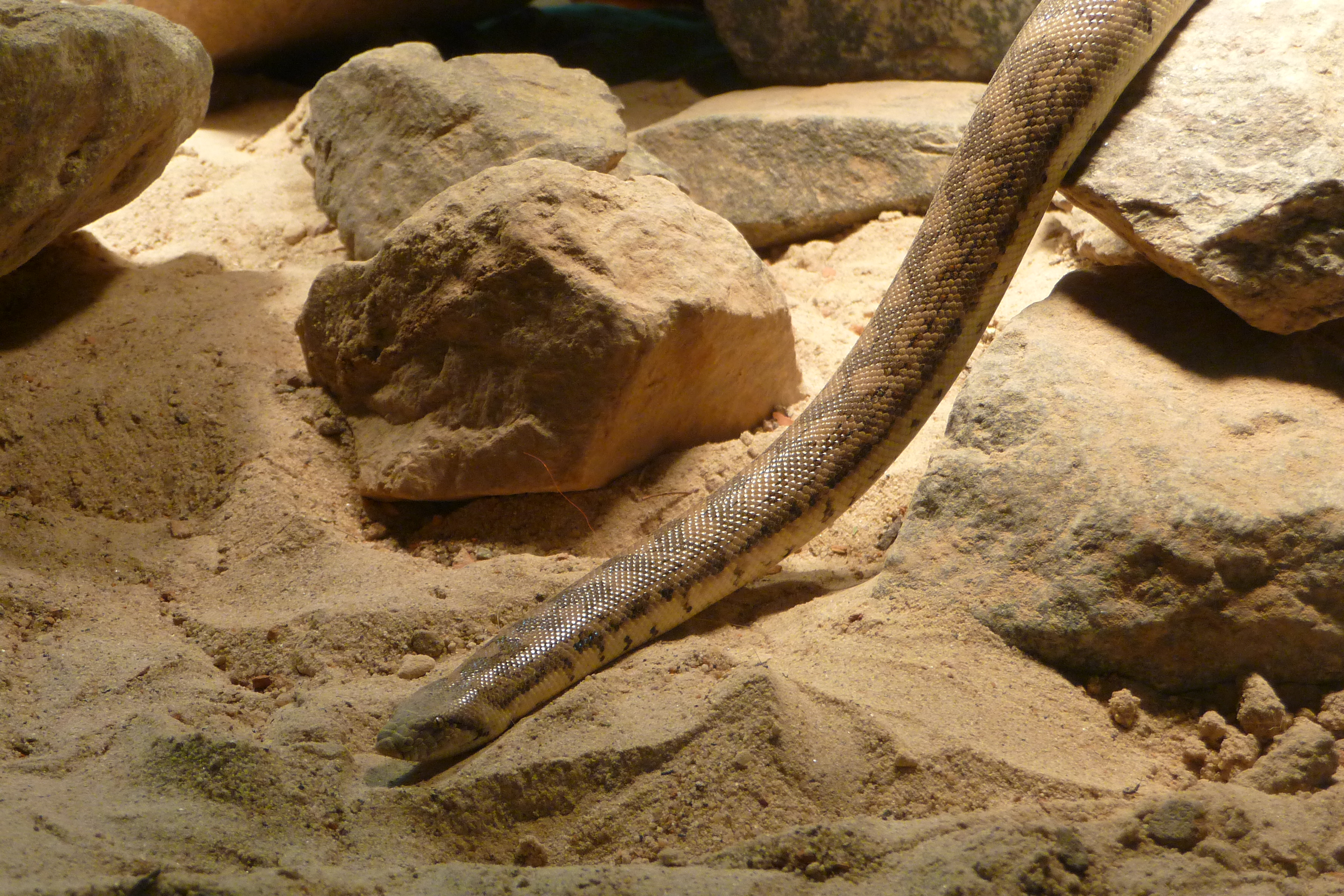
A Tartar sand boa, possible inspiration for the legend

The Mongolian death worm (Mongolian: олгой-хорхой, olgoi-khorkhoi, "large intestine-worm") is a cryptid of Mongolian folklore, said to live in the Gobi Desert.

Tales of the alleged animal first came to Western attention as a result of Roy Chapman Andrews's 1926 book On the Trail of Ancient Man. The American paleontologist described second-hand tales of the monster that he heard at a gathering of Mongolian officials: "None of those present ever had seen the creature, but they all firmly believed in its existence and described it minutely."

In 1983, a specimen of Tartar sand boa (Eryx tataricus) was shown to locals who claimed to have seen "olgoi-khorkhoi" and they confirmed that this was the same animal.

== Appearances ==
In On the Trail of Ancient Man, Andrews cites Mongolian prime minister Damdinbazar who, in 1922, described the worm:

It is shaped like a sausage about two feet long, has no head nor legs and is so poisonous that merely to touch it means instant death. It lives in the most desolate parts of the Gobi Desert.

In 1932, Andrews published this information again in the book The New Conquest of Central Asia, adding: "It is reported to live in the most arid, sandy regions of the western Gobi." Andrews, however, did not believe in the creature's existence.

The worm is said to inhabit the western or southern Gobi. In the 1987 book Altajn Tsaadakh Govd, Ivan Mackerle cites a Mongolian legend that described the creature as travelling underground, creating waves of sand on the surface which allow it to be detected. It is said it can kill at a distance, either by spraying a venom at its prey or by means of electric discharge. It primarily lives and burrows underground, only rarely coming to the surface. Some reports suggest the creature emerges after rainfall and lives near sources of water.

== Investigations ==
The animal was the basis of a short story, Olgoi-Khorkhoi (1944), by Russian paleontologist and science fiction writer Ivan Yefremov, written under the impression of Andrews's book. Between 1946 and 1949, Yefremov was studying fossils in the Gobi desert and wrote that he heard the legend of olgoi-khorkhoi many times, but nobody claimed to have seen it.

In 1990 and 1992, Ivan Mackerle led small groups of companions into the Gobi Desert to search for the worm. Inspired by Frank Herbert's novel Dune, in which giant fictional sandworms could be brought to the surface by rhythmic thumping, Mackerle constructed a motor-driven "thumper" and even used small explosions to try to find it.

In 2005, zoological journalist Richard Freeman of the Centre for Fortean Zoology mounted an expedition to hunt for the death worm but came up empty-handed. Freeman's conclusion was that the tales of the worm's powers had to be apocryphal, and that reported sightings likely involved an unknown species of worm lizard or amphisbaena.

Reality-television series Destination Truth conducted an expedition from 2006 to 2007.

A New Zealand television entertainment reporter, David Farrier of TV3 News, took part in an expedition in August 2009, but came up empty-handed as well. He conducted interviews with locals claiming to have seen the worm and mentioned on his website that sightings peaked in the 1950s.

== See also ==
- Graboid
- Hotheaded Naked Ice Borer
- Lambton Worm
- Sandworm (Dune)
- Lindworm
- Augerino
