= Paul Volkmann =

German physicist (1856–1938)

Paul Oskar Eduard Volkmann (12 January 1856 - 20 April 1938) was a German physicist, philosopher, and historian of science. He worked at the University of Königsberg. Influenced by Emmanuel Kant, he believed that knowledge was based on interaction between subject and object and that all concepts are relative.

Volkmann was born in Blaidau near Heiligenheil where his father was a clergyman. He went to the Friedrichkollegium in Königsberg (1864 - 1875) and then studied physics at the University of Königsberg where his teachers included Heinrich Weber and Woldemar Voigt. After his doctorate (1880) he worked with Voigt, succeeded him as assistant professor of theoretical physics in 1886. He later moved to deal with epistemology and the history of science. In 1894 he examined if physics could be reduced to axioms in an essay "Hat die Physik Axiome?" He argued that there could not be axioms in physics and that principles in physics are retroactively consolidated. He argued that the "conceptual system of physics should not be conceived as one which is produced bottom-up like a building. Rather it is like a thorough system of cross-references, which is built like a vault or the arch of a bridge, and which demands that the most diverse references must be made in advance from the outset, and reciprocally, that as later constructions are performed the most diverse retrospections to earlier dispositions and determinations must hold. Physics, briefly said, is a conceptual system which is consolidated retroactively". He influenced David Hilbert and was a supervisor of Emil Wiechert. In 1896 he published "Erkenntnistheoretische Grundzüce der Naturwissenschaften" which was given a bad review by Karl Pearson.
