= Fane Airport =

Airport in Fane, Central, Papua New Guinea

- IATA: FNE; ICAO: AYFA

Summary
- Location: Fane, Papua New Guinea
- Elevation AMSL: 4,300 ft / 1,311 m
- Coordinates: 08°33.07′S 147°05.11′E

Map
- Location of airport in Papua New Guinea

Runways
Direction	Length		Surface
Direction	m	ft	Surface
01/19	451	1,480
- Source: PNG Airstrip Guide

Fane Airport is an airfield serving Fane, in the Central Province of Papua New Guinea.
