= DTest =

Czech monthly magazine

dTest
- Editor: Ida Rozová
- Frequency: Monthly
- Publisher: Občanské sdružení spotřebitelů TEST
- Founded: 1992; 34 years ago
- Country: Czech Republic
- Language: Czech
- Website: www.dtest.cz

dTest is a Czech monthly magazine established in 1992. The magazine is the official organ of the Czech Association of Consumers. It focuses on testing products and services and also provides help with consumer and seller rights, informs about new laws, warns against sharp practices of sellers and against suspicious commercials, advertisements, etc. There are also clues and tips for making complains. The products are bought directly in retail shops to make sure it is disinterested. The tests are then performed in independent laboratories in the Czech Republic as well as abroad.

dTest does not contain any advertisements and is fully financed by the income from sales and public sources. The selection of the tested products is not based on their manufacturers and is made on the basis of market analyses and consumer wishes.

dTest is a member of the BEUC since 2010. Until 2008 the magazine had only one staff, Ida Rozova who is the founder and chair of the Czech Association of Consumers. It had nearly 25 staff and the number of its subscribers was 54,000 as of 2012.

== See also ==
- List of magazines in the Czech Republic
