= Finance New Europe =

English language magazine and website

Finance New Europe is an English language magazine and website based in Prague, Czech Republic. It has been published since 2003 and is known to be the only business magazine focused on the central and eastern European (CEE) region as a whole, rather than on one single country.

== Format ==
The magazine is a bi-monthly (issued once every two months), and is printed on glossy color paper stock. Starting with the October–November 2006 issue, the main FNE magazine is accompanied by a stand-alone special supplement on a topic of interest to its readers. FNE's most recent printed issues were the February–March 2007 and the December 2006 – January 2007 editions, the latter of which featured its annual Achievement Awards. FNE's main magazine totals 64 interior pages, and has regular features such as the Focus omnibus of stories, Regional roundup (brief news bulletins separated by country), Eye on banks, two pages of statistics and one non-business feature, Almost the last page.

== Countries covered ==
True to its title, FNE emphasizes business in the "New" Europe, i.e. recent European Union inductees Czech Republic, Hungary, Poland, the Baltic States, Slovakia, Slovenia, Bulgaria and Romania. It also covers non-EU nations of the former Soviet bloc such as Russia, Ukraine, Belarus and the countries comprising the former Yugoslavia. From time to time, it also prints articles about Turkey.

== Distribution ==
The December 2006 – January 2007 edition of Finance New Europe had a print run of 13,000 copies and a distribution of approximately 9,600. Around 75% of this total went to readers in CEE, while the bulk of the remainder went to Western Europe. FNE distributes actively at business conferences organized by the top companies in the European conference sphere, such as Marcus Evans and Jacob Fleming.

== Staff and company premises ==
Finance New Europe has a full-time staff of 19 people, and its offices are in the Prague district of Holešovice. FNE's owner, Finance New Europe s.r.o., is a company registered in the Czech Republic. The magazine's publisher is Eric Volkman; its three editorial staffers are reporters Renate Zoeller, Dominic Swire and designer Blanka K. Špičáková.

== See also ==
- List of magazines in the Czech Republic
