= D10 motorway (Czech Republic) =

Czech motorway

D10 Motorway
- Dálnice D10

Route information
- Part of E65
- Length: 73 km (45 mi)

Major junctions
- From: D0 in Prague
- To: D35 near Turnov

Location
- Country: Czech Republic
- Regions: Prague, Central Bohemian, Liberec
- Major cities: Prague, Mladá Boleslav

Highway system
- Highways in the Czech Republic
← D8	→ D11

D10 motorway (Czech: Dálnice D10) is a motorway in the Czech Republic, running north-east, from Prague to Mladá Boleslav and Turnov. It forms part of the European route E65.

== Chronology ==
The construction of today's D10 motorway began in 1967 with the construction of an 8 kilometres (5.0 mi) long section between Bezděčín and Chudoplesy.

The sections leading away from Prague have been built since the 1970s, and at that time, it was planned to build the expressway to the Polish border. As part of a reassessment of the concept of motorway and expressway construction carried out in 1993, the plans for a continuation from Turnov, towards Harrachov and towards the Polish border were removed. Thus, it is considered to be the first completed expressway in the Czech Republic.

The motorway, formerly known as R10 Expressway (Czech: rychlostní silnice R10) was officially redesignated as the D10 on 1 January 2016.

=== Future developments ===
The D10 motorway is completed in its entire length according to the current motorway network concept. Therefore, all upcoming projects concern only construction modifications of already completed sections.

One project in development is the reconstruction of the Kosmonosy MÚK from a tubular intersection to a ring intersection over the motorway, which is being carried out by Eurovia at an approximate cost of CZK 737 million. The opening was planned for 2025.

== Gallery ==
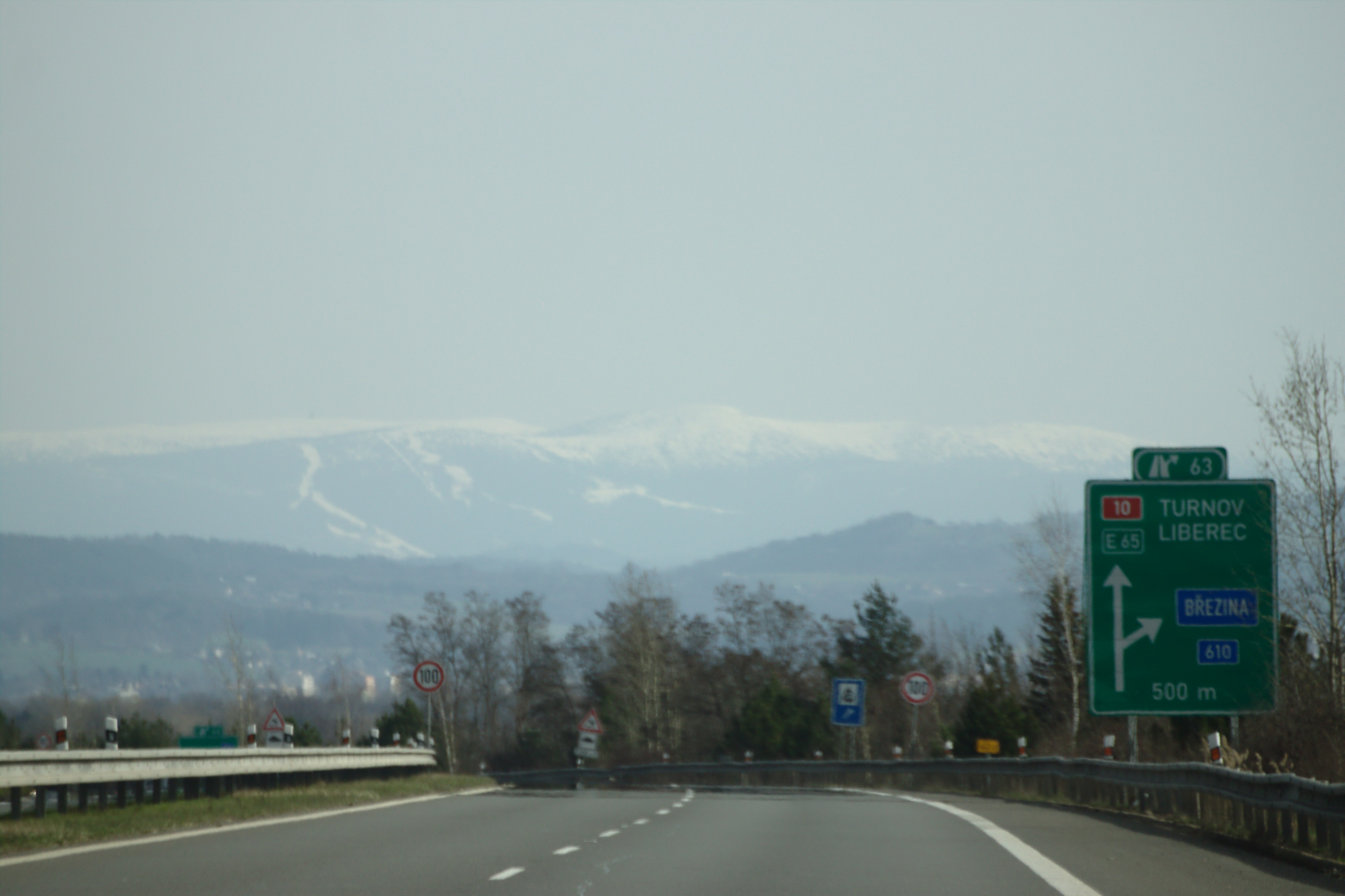
D10 near Svijany with the Giant Mountains in the background

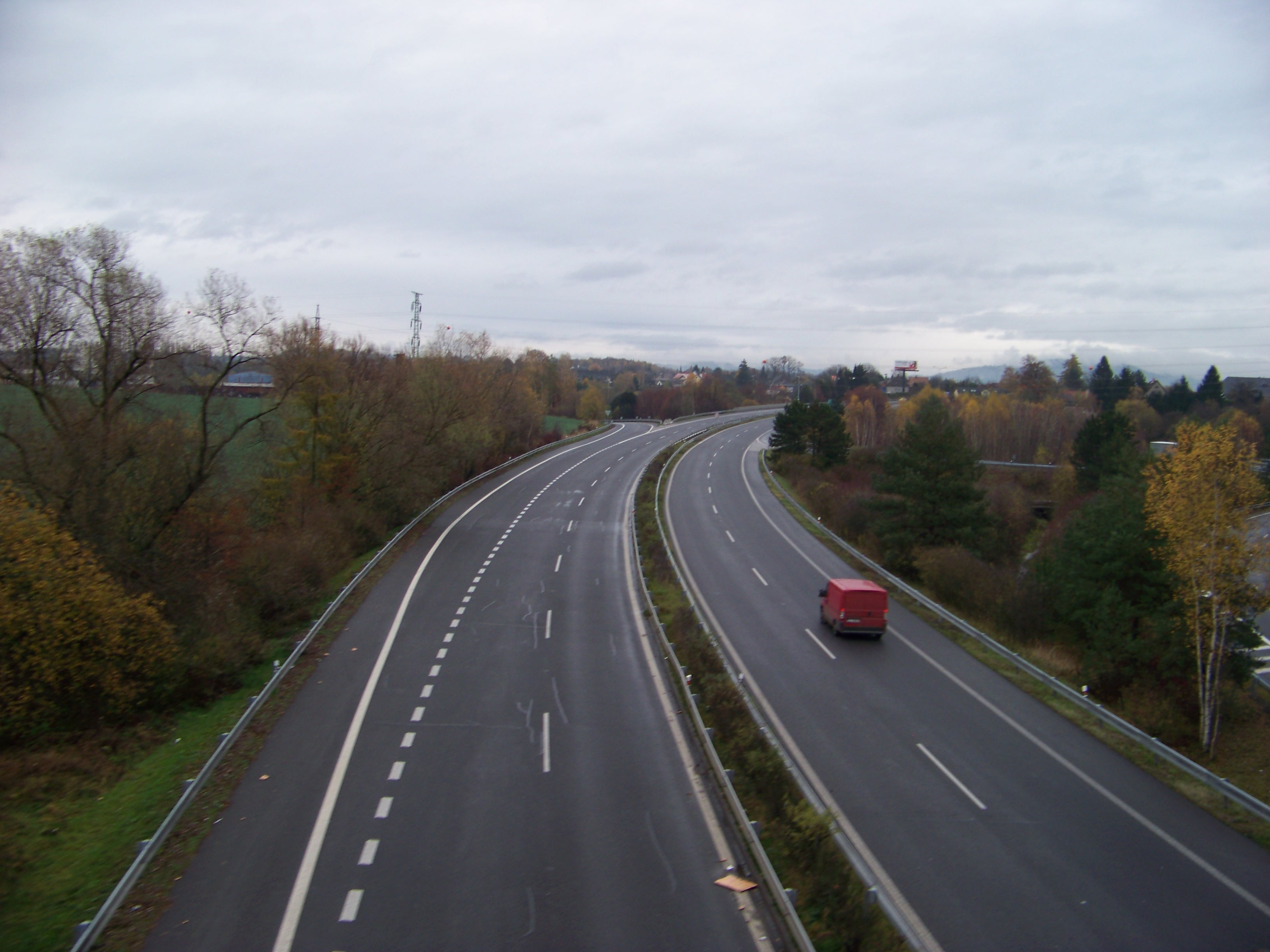
D10 in Ohrazenice

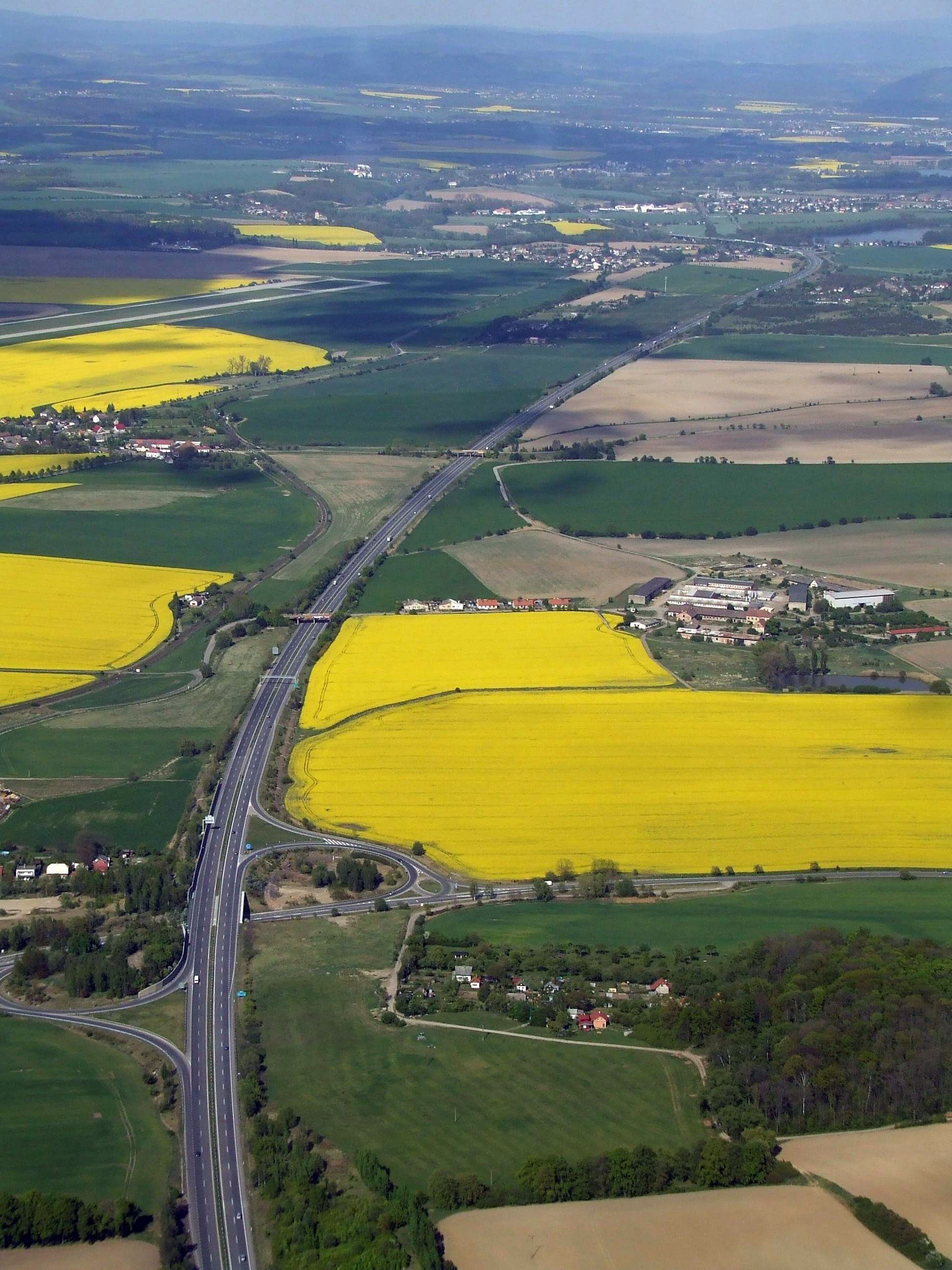
D10 near Mnichovo Hradiště
