= Bakala =

Bakala may refer to:

== People ==
- Břetislav Bakala - a Czech conductor, pianist, and composer.
- Zdeněk Bakala - a Czech entrepreneur, investor and philanthropist.
- Rastislav Bakala - a Slovak football midfielder.
- Ian Bakala - a Zambian footballer.

== Places ==
- Bakala (Central African Republic) - a sub-prefecture and town in the Ouaka Prefecture of the southern-central Central African Republic.
- Baba Bakala - a historical town and Tehsil in the Amritsar district in Punjab, India.

== Others ==
- Bakala Foundation - an educational group based in the Czech Republic
- Bakala (spider) - a genus of spiders
- Baba Bakala Assembly Constituency - a Punjab Legislative Assembly constituency in Amritsar district of India.

== See also ==
- Baklava
