= Zdeněk Bakala =

Czech businessman (born 1961)

- Born: 7 February 1961 (age 65); Opava, Czechoslovakia
- Citizenship: Czech Republic, United States
- Education: University of California, Berkeley; Tuck School of Business
- Known for: former ownership of OKD
- Spouse: Michaela Bakala

Zdeněk Bakala (born 7 February 1961) is a Czech-American businessman, investor and philanthropist. After a career in investment banking in the United States and the United Kingdom, he returned to Czechoslovakia in 1991 and founded Patria Finance in 1994. In 2004, an investor group led by Bakala acquired Karbon Invest, the majority owner of the coal-mining company OKD. The mining business was later reorganized under New World Resources (NWR), which was listed on the London, Prague and Warsaw stock exchanges in 2008. The same year, Bakala acquired the Czech media company Economia.

Bakala's ownership of OKD and NWR later became controversial, particularly because of disputes over the former OKD housing portfolio and payments made by the mining company before its insolvency. Several major legal claims connected with these disputes were subsequently dismissed by Czech courts. Bakala and his wife Michaela also established the Bakala Foundation in 2007, which supports education and journalism.

== Early life and education ==
Bakala was born in Opava, Czechoslovakia, in 1961. In 1980, at the age of 19, he left communist Czechoslovakia and moved to the United States. He studied microeconomics at the University of California, Berkeley, and later attended the Tuck School of Business at Dartmouth College, where he received an MBA in 1989.

After graduating, Bakala began a career in investment banking in New York, working for Drexel Burnham Lambert and Bank of America, before joining Credit Suisse First Boston in London. He returned to Prague in 1991.

== Business career ==
After returning to Prague in 1991, Bakala worked for Credit Suisse First Boston. In 1994, he founded Patria Finance, an investment banking company that became part of the Belgian KBC Group in 2000. Bakala remained its chief executive until January 2002.

In 2004, a group of investors led by Bakala acquired Karbon Invest, which controlled the Czech coal-mining company OKD. The mining business was later reorganized under New World Resources (NWR), with OKD as its main operating company. NWR was listed on the London, Prague and Warsaw stock exchanges in 2008. Bakala and his partners withdrew from NWR in 2016 as the company underwent financial restructuring.

Bakala also became active in the Czech media industry. He acquired the weekly Respekt in 2006 and, two years later, the publishing company Economia, whose publications include Hospodářské noviny, Ekonom and the news website Aktuálně.cz. Bakala remains Economia's sole shareholder. In 2023, Economia sold Respekt to a consortium of investors that included members of the magazine's editorial staff.

His later investments have been managed principally through Bakala Capital, with areas including real estate and media.

== Philanthropy ==
In 2007, Bakala and his wife Michaela Bakala established the Bakala Foundation, which supports education, journalism and civil society. Its programs include scholarships for Czech students attending universities abroad, support for secondary-school study overseas, and journalism training. By 2026, its Scholarship program had supported more than 220 students.

The Bakalas have also supported institutions including the Václav Havel Library and Aspen Institute Central Europe. In 2019, the Bakala Foundation USA donated $25 million to the Tuck School of Business at Dartmouth College to support its global learning program; Tuck described it at the time as the largest gift in the school's history.

== Disputes related to OKD and NWR ==
Bakala's involvement with OKD became the subject of long-running public and political controversy. In 2004, the Czech government sold its remaining 45.88% stake in OKD to majority shareholder Karbon Invest for CZK 4.1 billion. The sale price was later investigated, but the European Commission concluded in 2011 that it did not involve unlawful state aid. Czech criminal proceedings over the valuation also ended in acquittals, upheld in 2021.

A separate dispute concerned about 44,000 former OKD apartments. Bakala had discussed giving tenants an opportunity to buy their homes on preferential terms, but the housing business was later sold to other investors. In 2020, Czech courts ruled that neither the privatization agreement nor Bakala's statements created a legal obligation to sell the apartments to tenants.

After OKD entered insolvency in 2016, the company sued Bakala and New World Resources (NWR) for more than CZK 24.5 billion, alleging improper payments including dividends. The claim was dismissed in 2021, and the decision was upheld on appeal in 2024.

== See also ==
- List of Czechs by net worth
