= Zuzana Kultánová =

Czech novelist

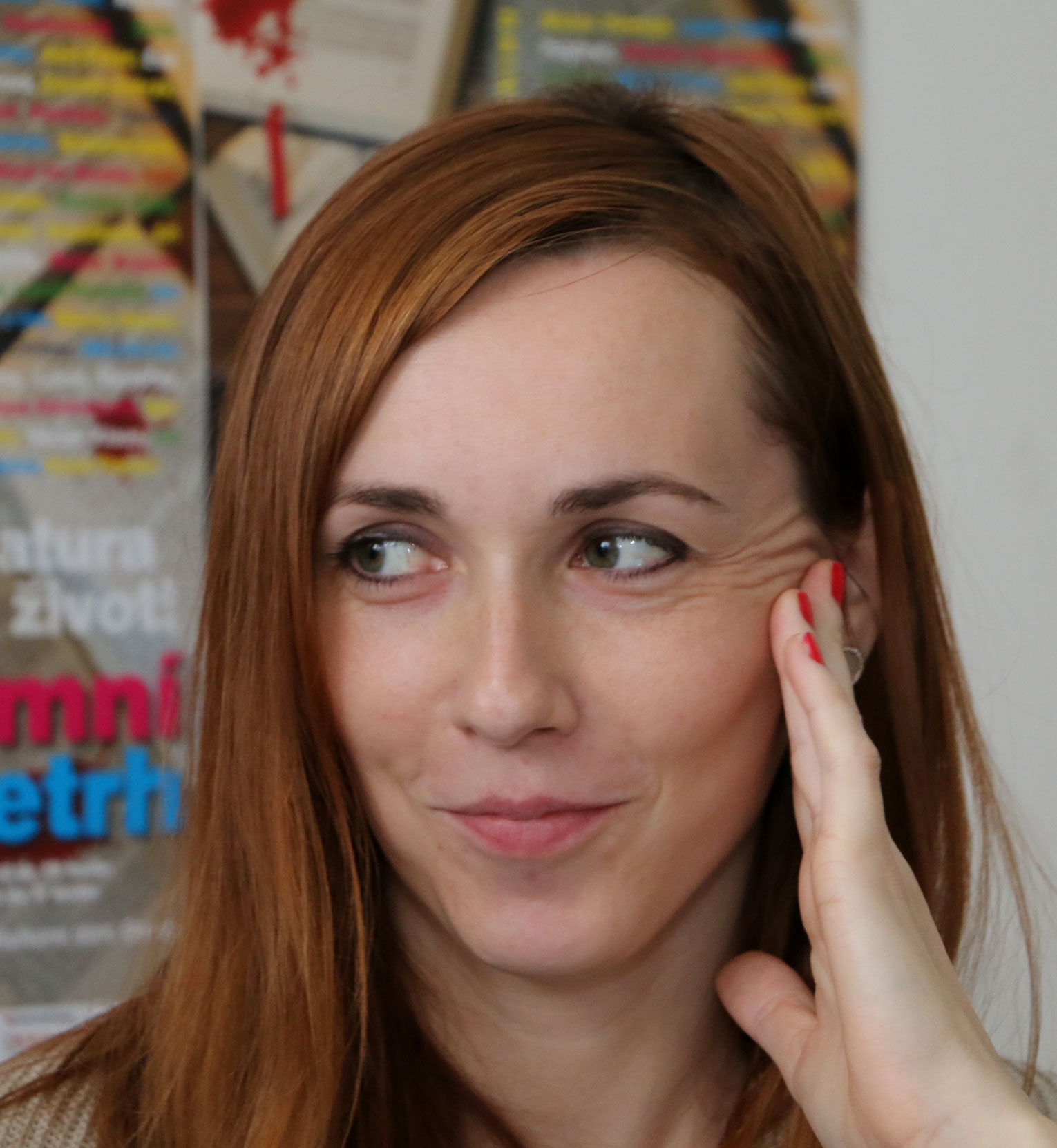
Zuzana Kultánová in 2017.

Zuzana Kultánová (born 1986) is a Czech novelist. For her debut novel, Augustin Zimmermann, she received the 2017 Jiří Orten Award given to the author of a work of prose or poetry who is no older than 30 at the time of the work's completion.

== Life and career ==
Zuzana Kultánová studied Czech language and literature at the University of Ostrava. Her debut novel, Augustin Zimmerman (ISBN 978-80-7473-421-2), was published by Kniha Zlín in 2016. It won the 2017 Jiří Orten Award. The novel was also nominated for the literary prize Magnesia Litera in the "Discovery of the Year" category.

== Awards ==
- 2017 Jiří Orten Award
