= Gymnázium Jana Keplera =

School in Prague, Czech Republic

- Gymnázium Jana Keplera

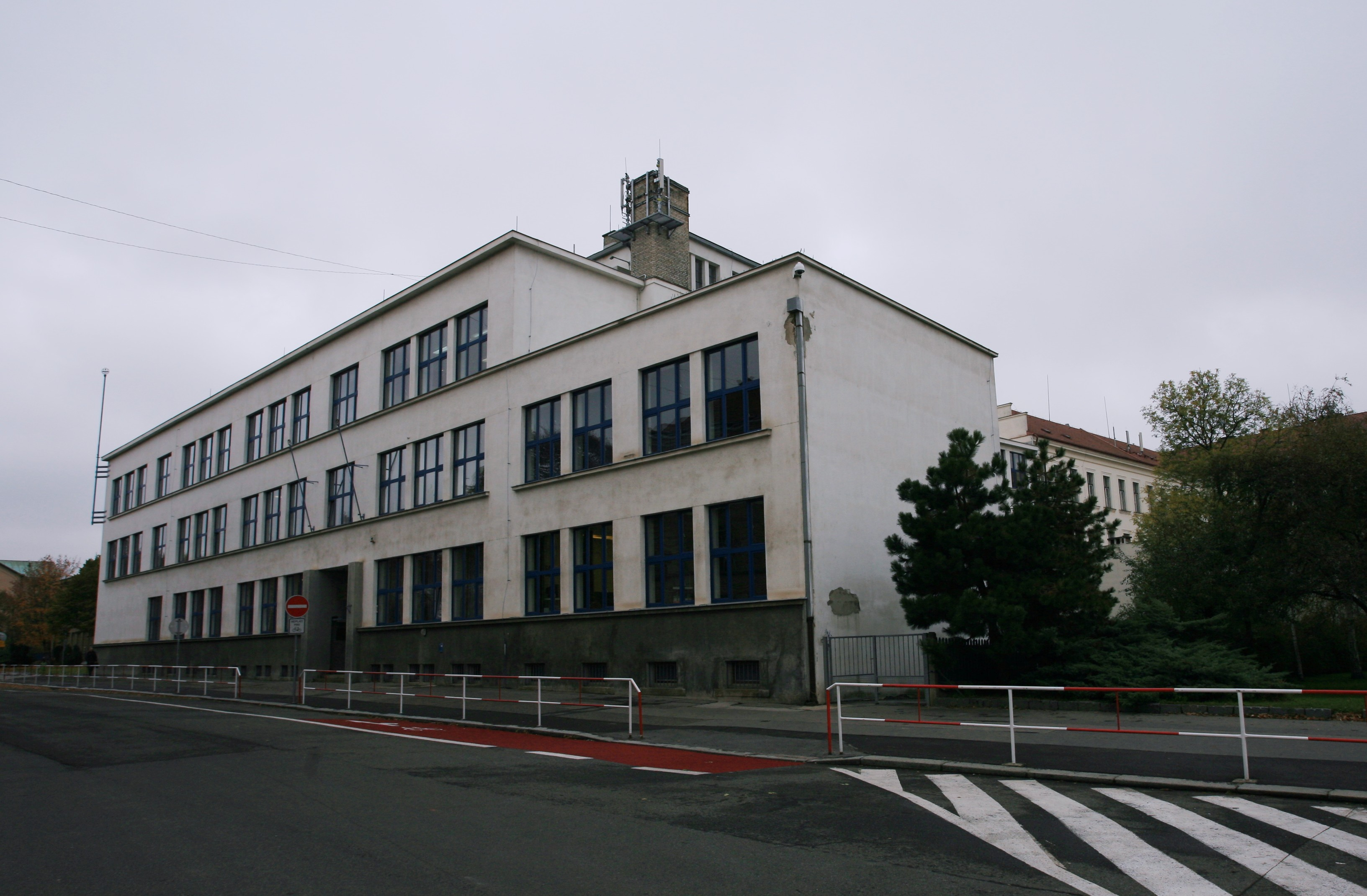
- Main entrance on Parléřova Street

Location
- Parléřova 2/118; Prague, 169 00; Czech Republic; 50.08792833°N 14.3869944°E

Information
- Other name: Johannes Kepler Grammar School
- School type: Public, Gymnasium
- Motto: Per aspera ad astra
- Established: 1932; 94 years ago
- Director: Karel Žďárek
- Enrollment: 582 (2024–25)
- Capacity: 600
- Classes: 20
- Language: Czech
- Website: gjk.cz

Gymnázium Jana Keplera (GJK; English: Johannes Kepler Grammar School) is a public gymnasium in Prague 6, Czech Republic. It offers four-year and eight-year programmes of general secondary education leading to the maturita examination. In the 2024–25 school year, the school had 582 students in 20 classes. Admission is selective, and the school has a reputation for great academic performance. In 2024, it was described as having a reputation as one of the most prestigious and academically demanding gymnasiums in the Czech Republic.

The school has borne the name of astronomer Johannes Kepler since 1971, reflecting his historical connection with the site, where he worked with Tycho Brahe. Its campus near Pohořelec developed from two originally separate school buildings that were connected in 1995. A modern sports hall was added in 2009. Notable former students include architect Jan Kaplický and politician and former prime minister Petr Pithart.

== History ==
The school occupies a site at Pohořelec that has a long educational and scientific history. An older school building on Hládkov was completed in 1901, while a second building on Parléřova Street was completed in 1932 in the Functionalist style. The site had previously included the Renaissance residence of imperial vice-chancellor Jacob Kurz von Senftenau, where astronomers Tycho Brahe and Johannes Kepler carried out astronomical observations in the early 17th century.

The present school developed through several reorganizations of Czechoslovak secondary education. In 1953, the Reálné gymnázium Na Hládkově was reorganized as an eleven-year school and moved into the Parléřova building. After another school reform in 1960, the secondary school operated as Střední všeobecně vzdělávací škola Parléřova. It became Gymnázium Parléřova in 1968.

In 1971, the school was renamed Gymnázium Jana Keplera in honour of Johannes Kepler and his historical connection with the site. The Hládkov and Parléřova buildings, which had previously been used separately, were joined during a reconstruction in 1995. The campus was expanded again in 2009 with the addition of a new sports hall.

== Education ==
Gymnázium Jana Keplera offers four-year and eight-year programmes of general secondary education, both leading to the maturita examination. Its school curriculum, titled Per aspera ad astra, combines compulsory subjects with a broad range of electives, particularly in the later years of study. Students can specialise according to their interests, and some subjects, including mathematics, are taught in groups divided by level.

Admission is competitive, particularly to the eight-year programme. It's been described as the most sought-after multi-year gymnasiums in Prague, with the number of applicants at times reaching several times the number of available places.

The Czech School Inspectorate has highlighted the school's emphasis on developing students' individual abilities. In its report it noted the extensive use of elective subjects and level-based teaching, particularly for gifted students. Students also regularly participate in academic competitions and certified foreign-language examinations.

=== Student life ===
Since 1997, students have organised Symposion, an annual multi-day forum held around International Students' Day. Each edition centres on a broad theme and features lectures and discussions with figures from academia and public life, alongside concerts and film screenings. Students are responsible for much of the organisation, including communication with speakers and programme preparation.

Other traditions include the annual Majáles, a student-organised spring festival featuring themed class campaigns and Kepler na Točníku, an annual school gathering at Točník Castle.

== Campus and architecture ==
The school campus consists of several buildings, with the oldest, on Hládkov, completed in 1901. Building on Parléřova Street, designed by Mečislav Petrů and Karel Beneš, was completed in 1932 in the Functionalist style. The two buildings originally operated separately and were connected during a reconstruction in 1995.

The campus has a library with more than 17,000 volumes, specialist classrooms and laboratories, a school restaurant Primirest, an outdoor sports field, a climbing wall and a fitness room.

A new sports hall, designed by the Prague architectural studio Sporadical, was added to the campus in 2009. The extension uses muted grey tones to complement the older Functionalist building, while its green roof forms a terrace accessible from the school library. The project received the Mayor of Prague 6 Award for the best new building in the district in 2009.

== Academic achievements ==
Students of Gymnázium Jana Keplera have regularly represented the Czech Republic at international academic olympiads, particularly in mathematics and physics. At the 2021 International Mathematical Olympiad, four of the six members of the Czech team attended GJK; Matouš Šafránek won a gold medal, while Magdaléna Mišinová and Samuel Rosiar won silver medals. In 2022, Šafránek won silver and Michal Janík and Rosiar won bronze, accounting for all three medals won by the Czech team.

In 2025, Martin Kudrna won gold at the International Olympiad on Astronomy and Astrophysics and silver at the International Physics Olympiad, while Jakub Trčka won bronze at the International Mathematical Olympiad. The school's students have also achieved international results in other scientific disciplines.

Students and alumni have also received scholarships for study at leading universities abroad, including the University of Cambridge, University of Oxford, ETH Zurich and Imperial College London. In 2016, four scholarships awarded by the Bakala Foundation went to students or graduates of GJK. More recently, GJK alumnus Martin Kudrna received support from both the Bakala Foundation and The Kellner Family Foundation for studying computer science at the University of Cambridge in 2025.

== Notable alumni ==
- Petr Pithart – politician and former prime minister and president of the Senate
- Pavel Rychetský – lawyer and politician, and former president of the Constitutional Court of the Czech Republic
- Jan Kaplický – architect and co-founder of Future Systems
- Lukáš Pollert – physician and Olympic champion in canoe slalom
- Jan Zahradil – politician and former member of the European Parliament
- Petra Buzková – lawyer and politician, and former minister of education
- Pavel Bobek – singer and architect
- Petra Hůlová – novelist and playwright
- Petr Borkovec – poet and translator
- Eduard Stehlík – military historian
- Jakub Szántó – journalist and foreign correspondent
- Michal Bursa – astronomer and director of the Astronomical Institute of the Czech Academy of Sciences
- Jakub Michálek – lawyer and politician
