= OKK Koksovny =

OKK Koksovny, a.s.

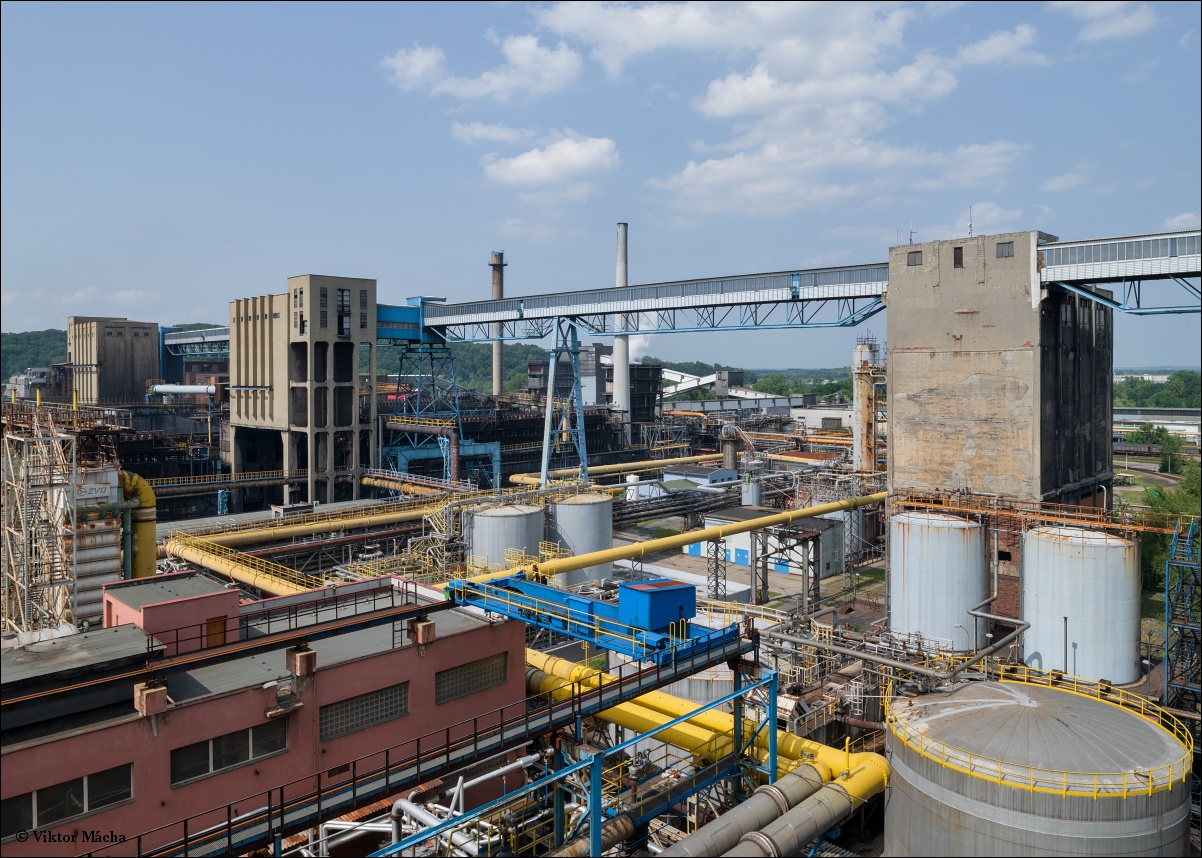
- The Svoboda Coking plant Complex
- Company type: Joint-stock company
- Industry: Coking
- Founded: 1994
- Headquarters: Ostrava, Czech Republic
- Key people: Zdeněk Durčák, CEO
- Products: Coke
- Revenue: 4,473,000,000 Czech koruna (1994)
- Net income: −44,000,000 Czech koruna (1994)
- Number of employees: 720 (2010)
- Parent: MTX Koksovny a.s.
- Website: www.koksovny.cz/en

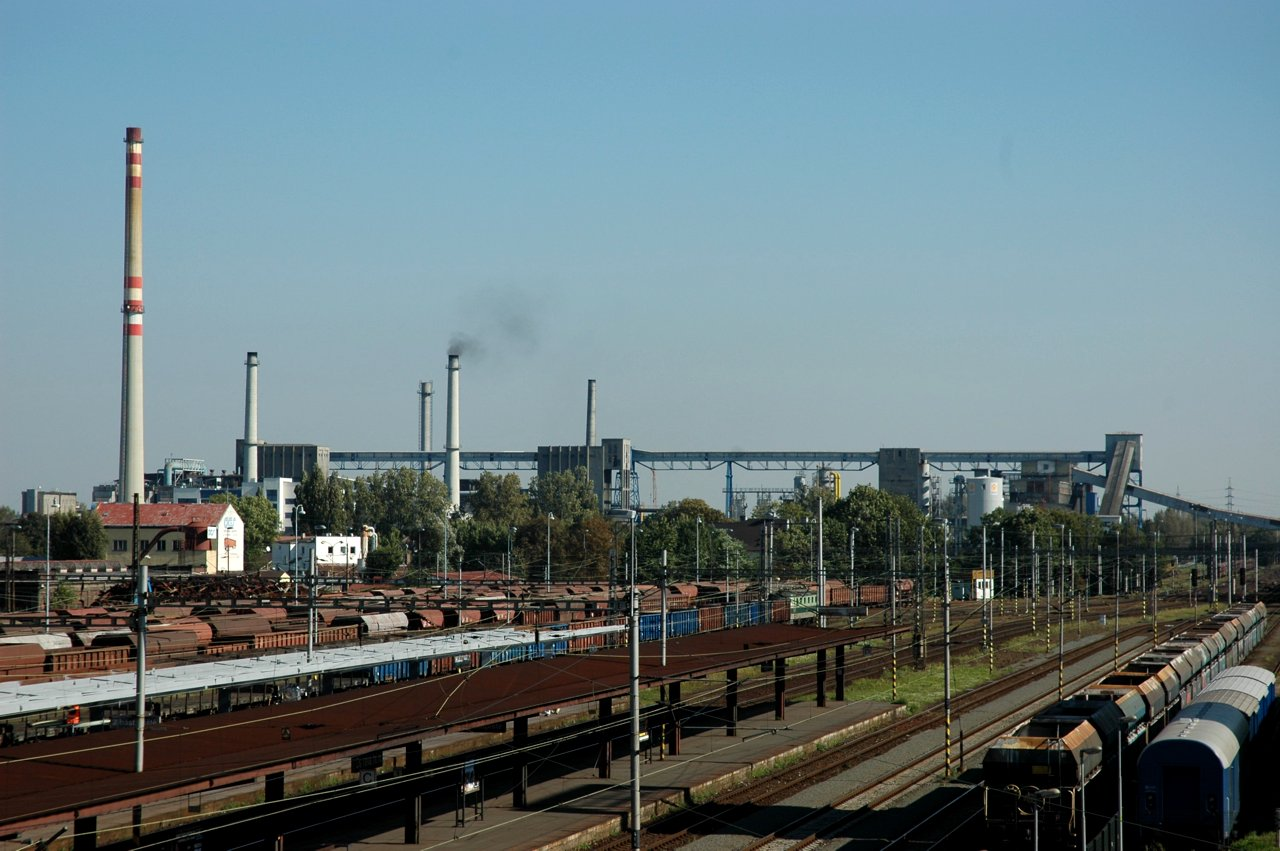
The Svoboda Coking plant Complex, heating plant and the rail track in Ostrava

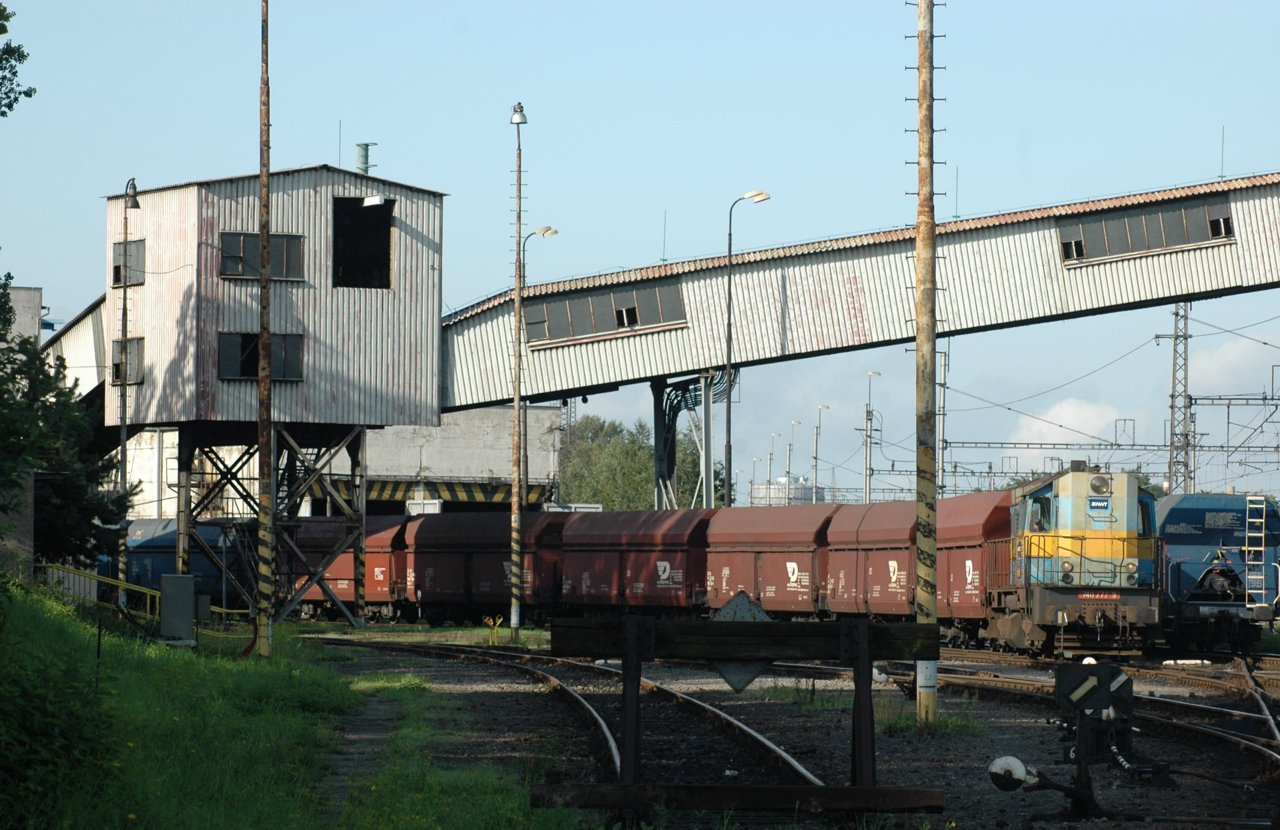
Coal unloading for Svoboda Coking plant

OKK Koksovny, a.s. (former names OKD, OKK, a.s. and Ostravsko-karvinské koksovny, akciová společnost) is a Czech coke producer. It is the largest producer of foundry coke in Europe. The company operates one plant in the city of Ostrava called 'Svoboda' facility.

== History ==
The production of coke in the Ostrava area dates back to the 1840s. In 1843 a coking plant named "Jan" (later renamed "President Beneš" and then "Czechoslovak Army" was founded. It later became a part of OKK. In 1952, the company OKK was founded and all operating coking plants were merged under one head office, having previously existed as separate state enterprises, except for the metallurgical coking plants (in the Ostrava quarter Vítkovice, in the cities of Třinec and Kladno, and the coking plant Nová Huť [New Smelting Works] founded in the same year). OKK included the coking plants in Ostrava: Svoboda, Jan Šverma, Karolina, Trojice, Czechoslovak army, and Lazy.

In 1994, the joint-stock company OKD, OKK was established on 1 January 1994 by the allocation of OKD, a. s. assets. It became a wholly owned subsidiary of OKD, a. s. The annual turnover of the company was around CZK 5.5 billion. The new enterprise was created by merging two mining coking plants located within the city of Ostrava and one more plant located in the Karviná region.

In 2008 after property changes the New World Resources Plc Company ("NWR") became a new owner of the OKD, OKK, a.s. NWR was also the owner of the OKD, a.s., a hard coal mining company.

Currently (2011) the OKK Koksovny, a.s. operates only one coking plant called 'Svoboda' facility.

== Company products ==
The main business of OKK Koksovny, a. s. is the production of coke. The company produces coke from virtually all types of coal suitable for coking. Coal is sourced from OKD mines as well as from abroad.

OKK Koksovny, a. s. is the largest European producer of foundry coke. The firm offers a broad assortment of coke types for foundry and metallurgical manufacturing, for special metallurgy, heating and other purposes. It also sells chemical products from the high-temperature coal carbonisation that takes place during the coking process.

== Production ==
Production fell between 2008 and 2009 by 34%, to 843,000 metric tons .

In 2011, their capacity was about 400,000 metric tons of coke.

== See also ==
- Energy in the Czech Republic
- Energy law
