= Marie Šťastná =

Czech poet (born 1981)

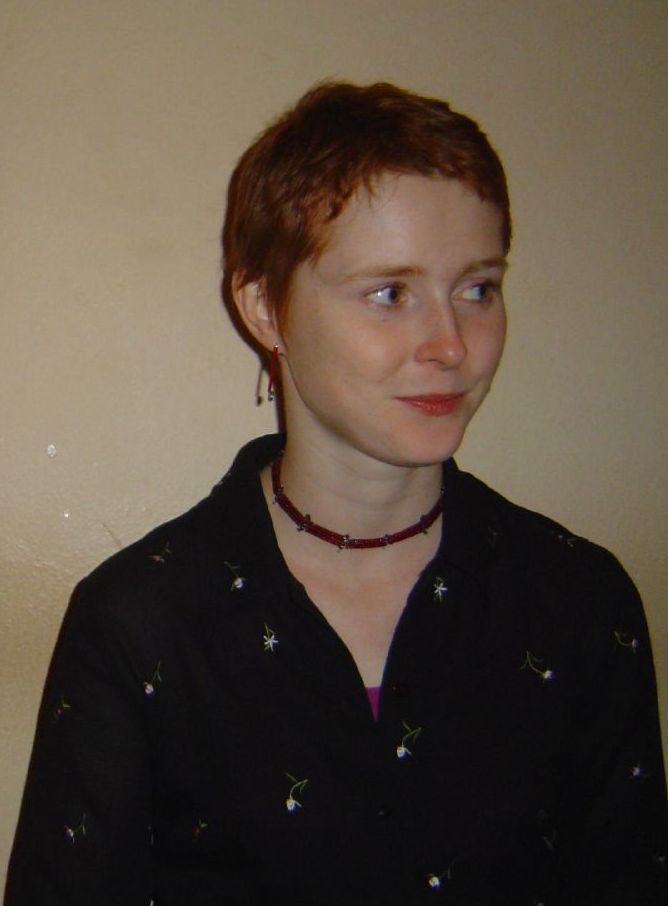
- Marie Šťastná
- Born: 6 April 1981; Valašské Meziříčí
- Occupation: Poet
- Writing career
- Period: 1999–present

Marie Šťastná (6 April 1981, Valašské Meziříčí, Czechoslovakia, now Czech Republic) is a Czech poet. She has a degree in Art History and History of Culture from the University of Ostrava.

She participated in Ortenova Kutná Hora, a literary competition for poets under 22 years of age.

- 1999-Third place
- 2000-Honourable mention
- 2001-Second to third place
- 2002-Honourable mention
- 2003-First place

In 2004 she received the Jiří Orten Award, a prestigious award for authors under thirty years, for her collection of poems, Krajina s Ofélií (Scenery with Ophelia). Juror Ivan Binar said "The unsightly book with a suspicious title was a great surprise and pleasure for me. I began reading, and didn't stop until I reached the end".

In 2010 she was awarded the Dresdner Lyrikpreis.

Šťastná regularly holds public readings of her works in Ostrava and Brno, but also attends larger literature events such as "Literature May". She lives in Prague, Czech Republic.

== Works ==
Years link to corresponding "[year] in poetry" articles:

- 1999: Jarním pokrytcům ("To Spring Hypocrites")
- 2003: Krajina s Ofélií ("Scenery with Ophelia")
- 2006: Akty ("Nudes"),
