= Economia =

Czech media company

Economia a.s.
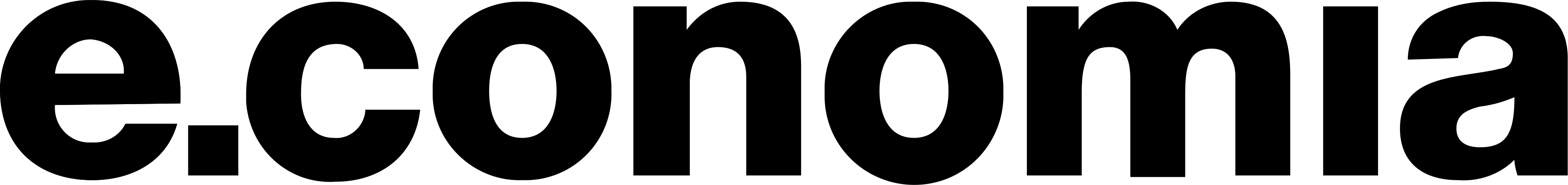
- Type: Joint-stock company
- Founded: 1990
- Headquarters: Prague, Czech Republic
- Area served: Czech Republic; Slovakia
- Revenue: 570,100,000 Czech koruna (2025)
- Operating income: 502,000 Czech koruna (2025)
- Net income: −2,975,000 Czech koruna (2025)
- Total assets: 342,396,000 Czech koruna (2024)
- Owner: Zdeněk Bakala
- Number of employees: 234 (2023)
- Website: www.economia.cz

Economia a.s. is a Czech media company based in Prague. It publishes the business daily Hospodářské noviny and the weekly magazine Ekonom, and operates online services including Aktuálně.cz, HN.cz and Centrum.cz. Its sole shareholder is businessman Zdeněk Bakala.

Founded in 1990, Economia came under the control of Zdeněk Bakala in 2008 and expanded its online operations through the acquisition of Centrum Holdings in 2013. It published the weekly magazine Respekt until its sale in 2023.

== History ==
Economia was founded in 1990. The German publishing group Verlagsgruppe Handelsblatt was its principal shareholder from 1994 until 2008.

In 2008, Respekt Media controlled by Zdeněk Bakala acquired Handelsblatt Investments B.V., the Dutch holding company through which Verlagsgruppe Handelsblatt held its 88.36% stake in Economia.. In July 2010, Bakala-controlled Handelsblatt Investments acquired the 10.8% stake held by the Czech News Agency (ČTK), increasing the controlling shareholder's holding to 99.2%.

In 2011, the group was consolidated, with the original Economia, Handelsblatt Investments and several related companies merged into a successor company that continued under the Economia name.

Economia also operated in Slovakia through its subsidiary Ecopress, publisher of the Slovak Hospodárske noviny. In April 2013, Economia sold Ecopress to Agrofert, as part of a restructuring that focused the company more closely on the Czech media market.

Later in 2013, Economia acquired Centrum Holdings, substantially expanding its online operations. The acquisition included the news website Aktuálně.cz and other online services operated by the group. Centrum Holdings and Respekt Publishing were formally merged into Economia in 2014.

Economia published the weekly magazine Respekt until 1 November 2023, when it sold the title to the newly established Respekt Media.

== See also ==
- Czech News Center
- Mafra (company)
