= Daniel's World =

2014 documentary film by Veronika Lišková

- Czech: Danielův svět
- Directed by: Veronika Lišková
- Screenplay by: Veronika Lišková
- Produced by: Zdeněk Holý
- Cinematography: Braňo Pažitka
- Edited by: Hedvika Hansalová
- Release date: 2014
- Running time: 75 minutes
- Country: Czechia
- Language: Czech

Daniel's World is a Czech documentary feature film about a year in the life of a young man who identifies as a paedophile, but has never sexually abused children. It premiered during the 2014 edition of the Ji.hlava International Documentary Film Festival, where it won the audience award. It was also screened in the Panorama section of the 2015 Berlinale. It was nominated for best documentary in 2015 Czech Film Critics' Awards, but did not win.

== Content ==
The film follows the main protagonist, Daniel, for a year. Daniel is a young student who has published fiction dealing with the subject of paedophilia. He attends a pride parade, meets his friends in the paedophile community, interacts with children of his friends or visits a sexologist. These scenes often have a voiceover recorded separately by the main protagonist.

== Critical reception ==
Kamil Fila of Respekt wrote that the film is “one of the saddest films in recent years, suggesting that while the film helps to de-demonize paedophilia, due to its taboo subject, it cannot be truly satisfying. On the other hand, Josef Chuchma of Lidové noviny wrote that the film is "too literary, descriptive both in audio and video" and that it is too long because its outreach motivation took precedence over its artistic merits.
