= Jaroslav Pížl =

Czech writer and musician (born 1961)

Jaroslav Pížl (born 5 November 1961) is a Czech poet, prose writer, lyricist and musician.

== Life and career ==
Jaroslav Pížl studied acting and writing at the Prague Conservatory. Since 1995 he has worked at the Jaroslav Ježek Conservatory in Prague where he teaches acting and singing interpretation. In 1992 he received the Jiří Orten Award for the book of Manévry. During the 1990s he released four poetry collections: Exteriéry (Exteriors) (1994), Svět zvířat (Animal World) (1996), Vodní hry (Water Games) (1998), and Rodinný život (Family Life) (2000). He teaches poetry both in the Czech Republic and abroad (Germany, Austria, Denmark, France, USA).

== Awards ==
- 1992 Jiří Orten Award

== Bibliography ==
- Manévry. Praha: Nakladatelství Q, 1992. ISBN 80-900674-2-5.
- Exteriéry. Praha: Bonaventura, 1994. ISBN 80-85197-08-1.
- Svět zvířat. Praha: Torst, 1996. ISBN 80-85639-83-1.
- Vodní hry. Brno: Petrov, 1998. ISBN 80-7227-017-6.
- Rodinný život. Brno: Petrov, 2000. ISBN 80-7227-075-3.
- Sběratelé knih. Brno: Petrov, 2004. ISBN 80-7227-195-4.
- Adrenalin. Brno: Druhé město, 2010. ISBN 978-80-7227-296-9.
