= Zapisovatelé otcovský lásky =

Czech novel by Michal Viewegh

- Author: Michal Viewegh
- Language: Czech
- Publication date: 1998

Zapisovatelé otcovský lásky is a Czech novel, written by Michal Viewegh. It was first published in 1998.
