= Kateřina Kováčová =

Czech poet

Kateřina Kováčová (born 16 July 1982) is a Czech poet. For her debut poetry collection, Hnízda, she won the 2005 Jiří Orten Award given to the author of a work of prose or poetry who is no older than 30 at the time of the work's completion.

== Life and career ==
From 2001-2006, she studied Czech and English at the Pedagogical Faculty of JE Purkyně University in Ústí nad Labem.

== Awards ==
- 2005 Jiří Orten Award

== Bibliography ==
Poetry

- Sem cejtila les. Opava: Perplex, 2015. (9788087370155)
- Soumračno. Praha : Protis, 2007. (9788073860004)
- Hnízda. Ústí nad Labem : CKK sv. Vojtěcha, 2005. (ISBN 8023956221)

Children's Books

- Byliny malé čarodějky. Praha: Slovart, 2015. (9788075290274)
- O Lucince a kouzelné lucerně. Praha : Junák - svaz skautů a skautek ČR, 2011. (9788086825601)
