= The Case of Unfaithful Klara =

2003 novel by Michal Viewegh

Případ nevěrné Kláry ("The Case of Unfaithful Klara") is a Czech novel, written by Michal Viewegh. It was first published in 2003.

The book was made into a film of the same name in 2009.
