= Vít Kremlička =

Czech poet and writer (born 1962)

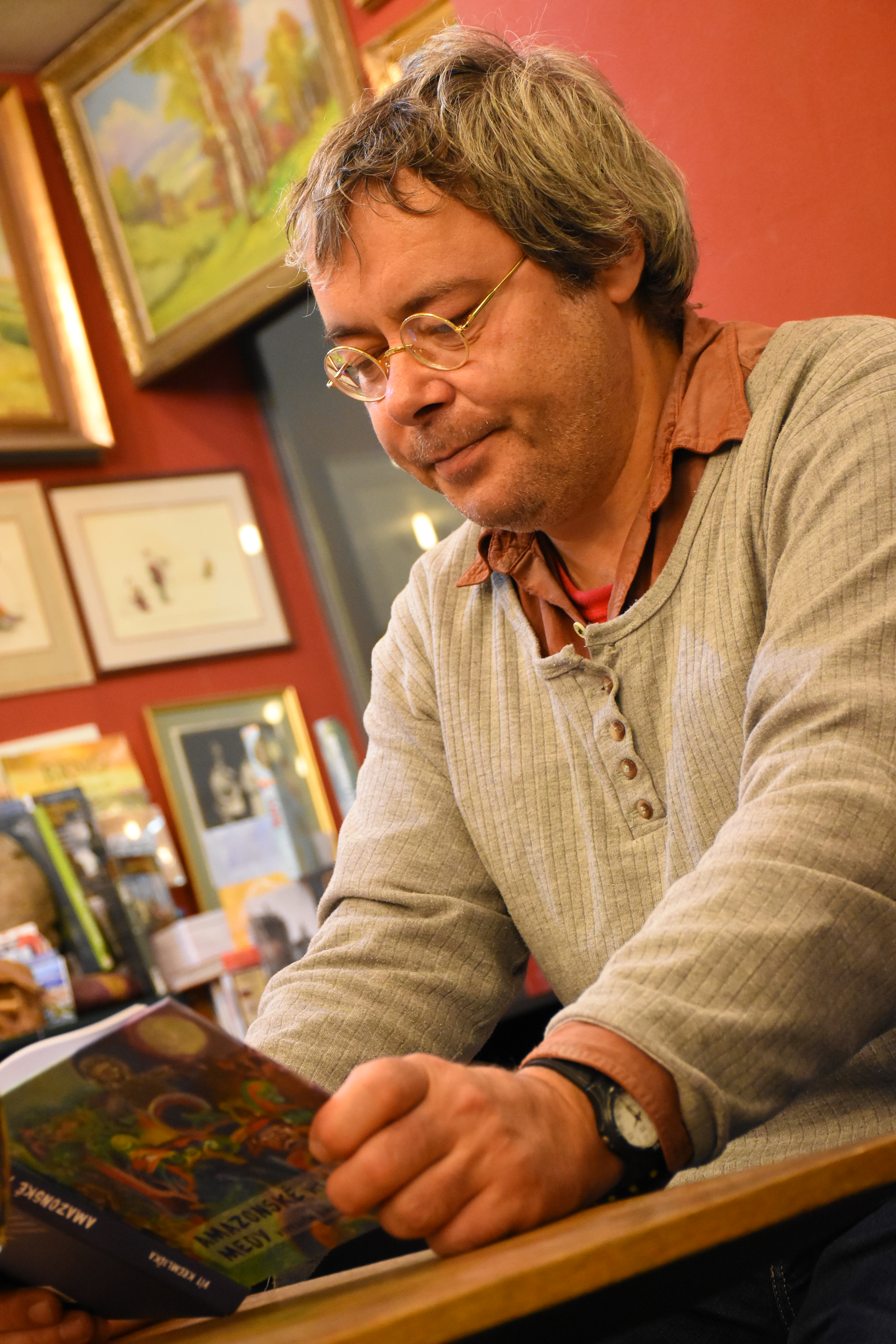
- Vít Kremlička, 2015
- Born: 22 October 1962 (age 63)
- Occupations: writer, poet

Vít Kremlička (born 22 October 1962) is a Czech poet and a writer.

== Life ==
Vít Kremlička is Czech poet and writer, laureate of Jiří Orten Prize (1991).

== Work ==
- Lodní deník, Nezávislé tiskové středisko, 1991 — Jiří Orten Award
- Cizrna, Torst, 1995
- Starý zpěvy, Revolver Revue, 1997
- Zemský povídky, Hynek, 1999
- Prozatím, Petrov, 2001
- Amazonia, Klokočí a Knihovna Jana Drdy, 2003
- Manael, Protis, 2005
- Země Noc, básnická sbírka, Clinamen 2006
- Tajná cikánská kronika, Pavel Mervart (Edice současné české poezie) 2007
