= Ondřej Macl =

Czech poet and actor (born 1989)

Ondřej Macl (born 1989) is a Czech poet and actor. He studied acting at DAMU, the Academy of Performing Arts in Prague in the Faculty of Theatre. He graduated in comparative literature at Charles University in Prague, had a six-month internship at Paris-Sorbonne IV, and studied social work and journalism at the Masaryk University in Brno. He won the Jiří Orten Award in 2018 for his debut book of poetry, Miluji svou babičku víc než mladé dívky.

== Awards ==
- 2018 Jiří Orten Award
