= Michal Viewegh =

Czech author (born 1962)

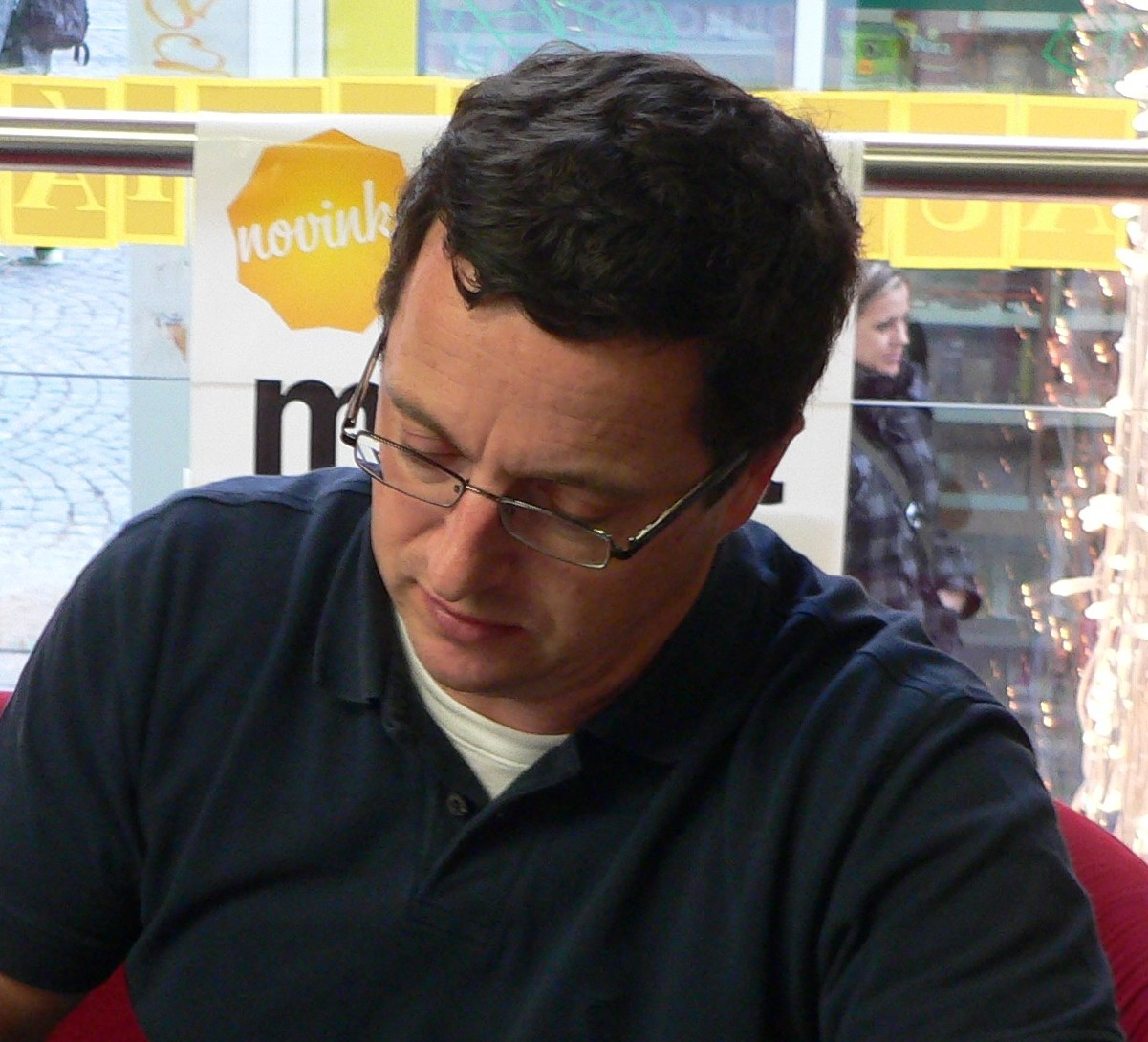
- Viewegh in 2008
- Born: 31 March 1962 (age 64); Prague, Czechoslovakia
- Education: Pedagogy
- Alma mater: Charles University
- Occupation: Writer
- Children: 3
- Writing career
- Notable works: Báječná léta pod psa; Výchova dívek v Čechách; Účastníci zájezdu; Román pro ženy
- Website: michalviewegh.com

Signature
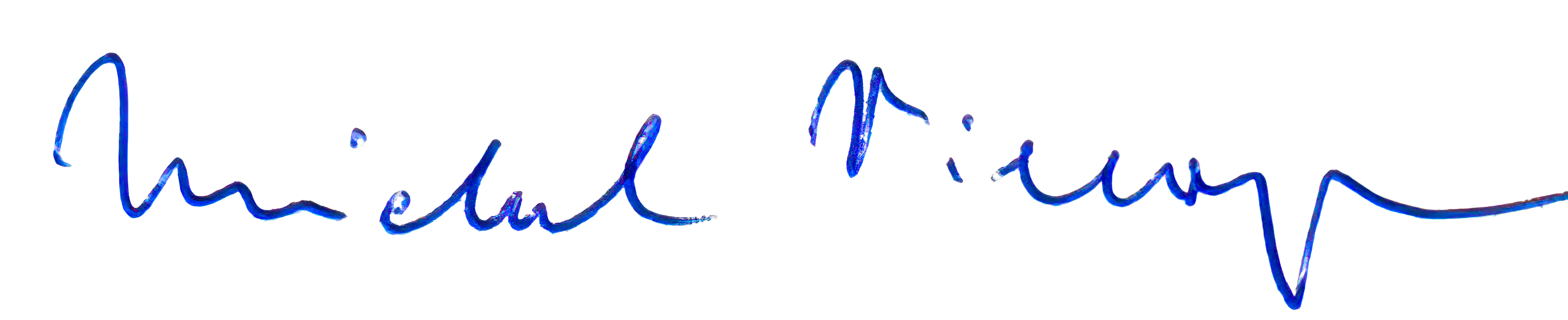

Michal Viewegh is a Czech writer. He is the most published Czech author of all time, with over a million books sold. In 1993, he earned the prestigious Jiří Orten award for Czech writers 30 years old or younger.

Viewegh survived a traumatic aortic rupture in 2012.

== Life ==
Michal Viewegh was born in Prague on 31 March 1962. His mother is a lawyer. His father was a chemical engineer, and then the mayor of Sázava.

Viewegh graduated from Benešov Gymnazium in 1980. He studied economics at the Prague University of Economics and Business, but dropped out. He then completed a degree in Czech and in pedagogy at Charles University in the Philosophy department in 1988. While in school, Viewegh began publishing short stories in Mladá fronta, with his first story published in 1983.

After graduating from university in 1988, Viewegh worked as an elementary school teacher until 1993. In 1993, he was awarded the Jiří Orten award for young Czech authors. For two years, he worked as an editor at the publishing company Český spisovatel; after that, he was able to support himself as a professional author.

Viewegh has been married twice, first to Jaroslava Macková, with whom he has one daughter, Michaela. In 2002, he married Veronika Vieweghová (née Kodytková). They have two daughters, Sára and Barbora. They divorced in 2015.

On 12 December 2012, Viewegh suffered a traumatic aorta rupture. He suffered from depression and memory loss during his rehabilitation and was unable to write. However, it also helped him gain a new perspective on the relative importance of some of his problems before the accident. Viewegh said that when he thinks about the fact that 90% of people with a ruptured aorta do not survive, he does not worry about criticism, the tabloids, or politics anymore.

He has lived most of his life in Sázava, a village in central Bohemia.

== Works ==
Viewegh's first book was the novella Názory na vraždu (Opinions on a Murder), published in 1990. His first full-length novel was Báječná léta pod psa (The Wonderful Years that Sucked), a semi-autobiographical novel which portrayed Czechoslovakia between the Prague Spring in 1968 and the fall of communism in 1989. In 1997, it was adapted into a very successful film, directed by Petr Nikolaev.

Viewegh has published novels almost every spring since the late 1990s. He sells around 50,000 copies per book and has sold over a million books total, making him the most published Czech author of all time. His works have been translated into 23 languages. His most famous works include Báječná léta pod psa, Výchova dívek v Čechách (Bringing Up Girls in Bohemia, 1994), and Román pro ženy (A Novel for Women, 2001).

In addition to novels, which make up the majority of his work, Viewegh has also published several other genres of literature. Nápady laskavého čtenáře (Thoughts of a Loving Reader, 1993) and Nové nápady laskavého čtenáře (New Thoughts of a Loving Reader, 2000) are both examples of literary parody, in which Viewegh parodies famous Czech and world authors.

Viewegh has also published collections of short stories. Additionally, he has published several autobiographical works, each capturing a small portion of his life in diary format. Můj život po životě (My Life After Life), published in 2013, details his recovery from his ruptured aorta.

Since the ruptured aorta, Viewegh has been much less prolific and successful as a writer. He still suffers from short-term memory loss, lack of directional awareness, and depression. He publishes at a much slower rate than before the injury. The general consensus is that the quality of his writing has also declined; however, some argue that his works are less successful due to poor promotion from his publisher.

== Relationship with tabloid newspapers ==
For years, Viewegh has fought Czech tabloids in the court system, and criticized them publicly, accusing the tabloids of invading his privacy and of publishing false information about him. In 2009, Viewegh and actor Marek Vašut started a petition Vzkaz bulváru a výzva kolegům (A Message to the Tabloids and an Appeal to Colleagues) criticizing Czech tabloid tactics. Many influential artists, including actress Jiřina Bohdalová, signed the petition.

== Political views ==
Viewegh's 1992 novel Báječná léta pod psa uses humor to criticize conditions in Czechoslovakia under communism.

Viewegh was unhappy as a writer under communism, but likes the liberties of post-communist Czechoslovakia and the Czech Republic. Viewegh has said that "in the eighties I wrote two novels and neither of them were published. They were banned from being printed for the normal ideological reasons. After the revolution came absolute freedom. I was able to write just how I wanted, and to publish whatever I wanted."

Viewegh is also opposed to right-wing former Czech president Václav Klaus. This attitude is most notably displayed in his 2002 novel Báječná léta s Klausem (The Wonderful Years with Klaus), which is a loose continuation of Báječná léta pod psa.

== Scandals ==
In his column for Lidové noviny (Czech newspaper and online news site) published on 1 October 2018, Viewegh criticised Christine Blasey Ford's allegations of sexual assault against Brett Kavanaugh on the grounds that "putting her in an empty room, groping her, covering her mouth while trying to undress her" was an "innocent high-school petting" and that he thanks God that he, as a pubescent, was free to grope his female schoolmates without endangering his future career, without any "North-American cow" complaining about it. He has been criticised in turn by criminologist Pavel Houdek in a published open letter, that his views are what makes victims of sexual abuse keep it to themselves.

== Bibliography ==
- 1990 Názory na vraždu ("Opinions on a Murder")
- 1992 Báječná léta pod psa ("Bliss Was It In Bohemia") - humorous bestseller about the Communist era; adapted to film as Those Wonderful Years That Sucked in 1997 (co-scripted by Jan Novák)
- 1993 Nápady laskavého čtenáře ("Thoughts of a Loving Reader") - collection of literary parodies
- 1994 Výchova dívek v Čechách ("Bringing Up Girls in Bohemia") - translated by A. G. Brain (pseudonym of Gerald Turner) in 1996, ISBN 1-887378-05-7; made into a film in 1997
- 1996 Účastníci zájezdu ("Tourists on an Excursion") - made into a film in 2006, successful at Tribeca Film Festival
- 1998 Zapisovatelé otcovský lásky ("Notes on Fatherly Love")
- 1999 Povídky o manželství a sexu ("Tales of Marriage and Sex") - adapted to film as Shameless in 2008 (co-written with Jan Hřebejk)
- 2000 Nové nápady laskavého čtenáře ("New Thoughts of a Loving Reader") - second collection of literary parodies
- 2001 Román pro ženy ("A Woman's Novel") - made into a film in 2005
- 2002 Báječná léta s Klausem ("Wonderful Years with Klaus") - loose sequel to the first Wonderful Years criticising Václav Klaus before the Czech legislative election, 2002
- 2003 Případ nevěrné Kláry ("The Case of Unfaithful Clara") - the 2009 film of the same name is loosely based on the novel
- 2004 Vybíjená ("Dodgeball")
- 2004 Tři v háji – with Halina Pawlowská and Iva Hercíková
- 2006 Lekce tvůrčího psaní ("The Creative Writing Lesson") - novella
- 2006 Báječný rok ("Wonderful Year") - a diary of 2005
- 2007 Andělé všedního dne ("Angels of the Everyday") - novella with experience about his father's death
- 2008 Román pro muže ("A Man's Novel")
- 2009 Něco na těch Vánocích být musí ("What's So Special About Christmas, Anyway?") - short story collection published in 2010 by Garamond (Czech/English parallel text)
- 2010 Biomanželka ("Eco-Wife")
- 2011 Mafie v Praze ("The Mafia in Prague")
- 2012 Mráz přichází z Hradu ("The Big Freeze from Prague Castle")
- 2013 Můj život po životě ("My Life After Life")
- 2015 Biomanžel ("Eco-Husband")

Collections of newspaper columns:

- Švédské stoly aneb Jací jsme (2000)
- Na dvou židlích (2004)
