= Martin Milan Šimečka =

Slovak journalist and writer (born 1957)

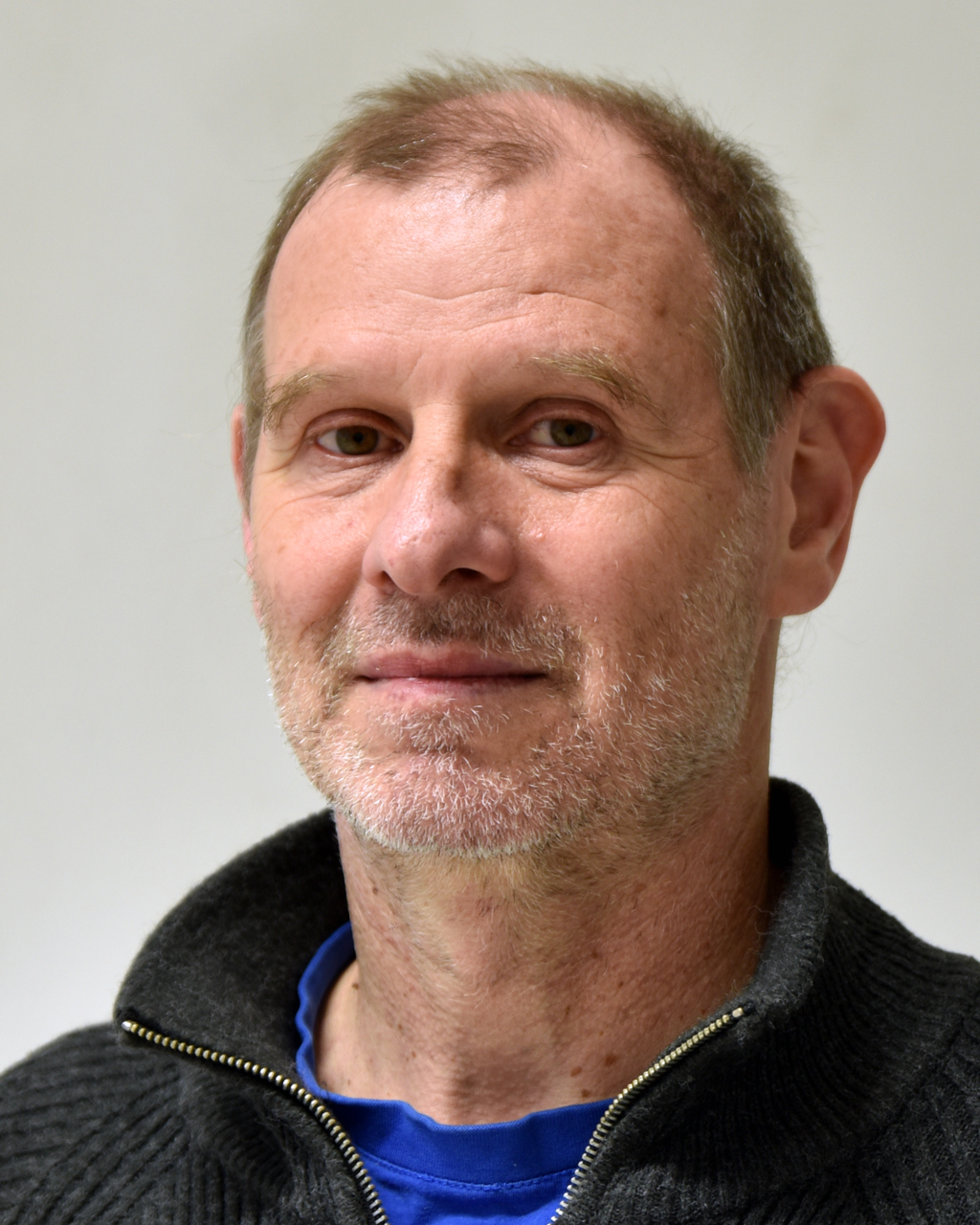
Martin Milan Šimečka in 2022

Martin Milan Šimečka (born 3 November 1957) is a Slovak journalist and writer.

== Life and career ==
Martin Milan Šimečka is the son of Milan Šimečka, a prominent Czech dissident during the Communist regime. He received technical training at the Slovnaft plant in Bratislava, then held a series of odd jobs. Until 1989, all of his works were published and distributed as samizdat.

In 1990 he founded the independent publishing house Archa, where he worked as chief editor until 1996. From 1997 to 1999 he worked as chief editor of Domino forum, a Slovak weekly publication. From 1997 to 2006, he was the editor-in-chief of SME, Slovakia's leading daily newspaper. From 2006 until 2008, he was editor-in-chief of the magazine Respekt, where he served as editor and contributor. Since 2016, he has been an editor at Denník N, a newspaper and internet service.

He received the Jiří Orten Award in 1988 for his autobiographical novel Žabí rok. The Jiří Orten Award is awarded to a work of prose or poetry whose author is no older than 30 at the time of the work's completion. In 2018, he was awarded the Order of Ľudovít Štúr, 1st Class.

== Writing ==
He began publishing in 1980 in samizdat magazines (Content, Contact, Fragment-K) and in editions (Petlice, Fragment-K). In the 1980s, he edited Tatarka's Navrávačky, which was published abroad. As a columnist he has contributed since 1989 to the periodicals Smena, Domino Forum, National Revival, Cultural Life, Slovenské pohľady, Literární noviny, Respekt, Listy, etc. He writes not only prose, but also journalistic works for various Slovak and foreign periodicals. His journalism focuses mainly on the Slovak political and cultural situation. In the field of prose, he emphasizes the authenticity of experiences as opposed to the world of real socialism, which is why his works contain many autobiographical elements.

== Awards ==
- 1988 Jiří Orten Award
- 2018 Order of Ľudovít Štúr, 1st Class

== Bibliography ==
- Žabí rok, 1985. In English translation: Year of the Frog. Touchstone Books, 1996. ISBN 068481367X; ISBN 978-0684813677.
- Džin. Archa, 1990.
- Záujem. Torst, 1997.
- Hľadanie obáv. Kalligram, 1998. ISBN 9788071492016
- Medzi Slovákmi. N Press, 2017. ISBN 9788097239435
- Světelná znamení. Salon, 2018. ISBN 9788097193546
- Telesná výchova. N Press, 2020. ISBN 9788099925671
- Všetko malo byť inak: Slovensko po roku 1945. Centrum environmentálnej an etickej výchovy ŽIVICA, 2020. ISBN 9788097296292
- Príhody tuláka po Slovensku. N Press, 2022. ISBN 9788082301192
