= Sára Vybíralová =

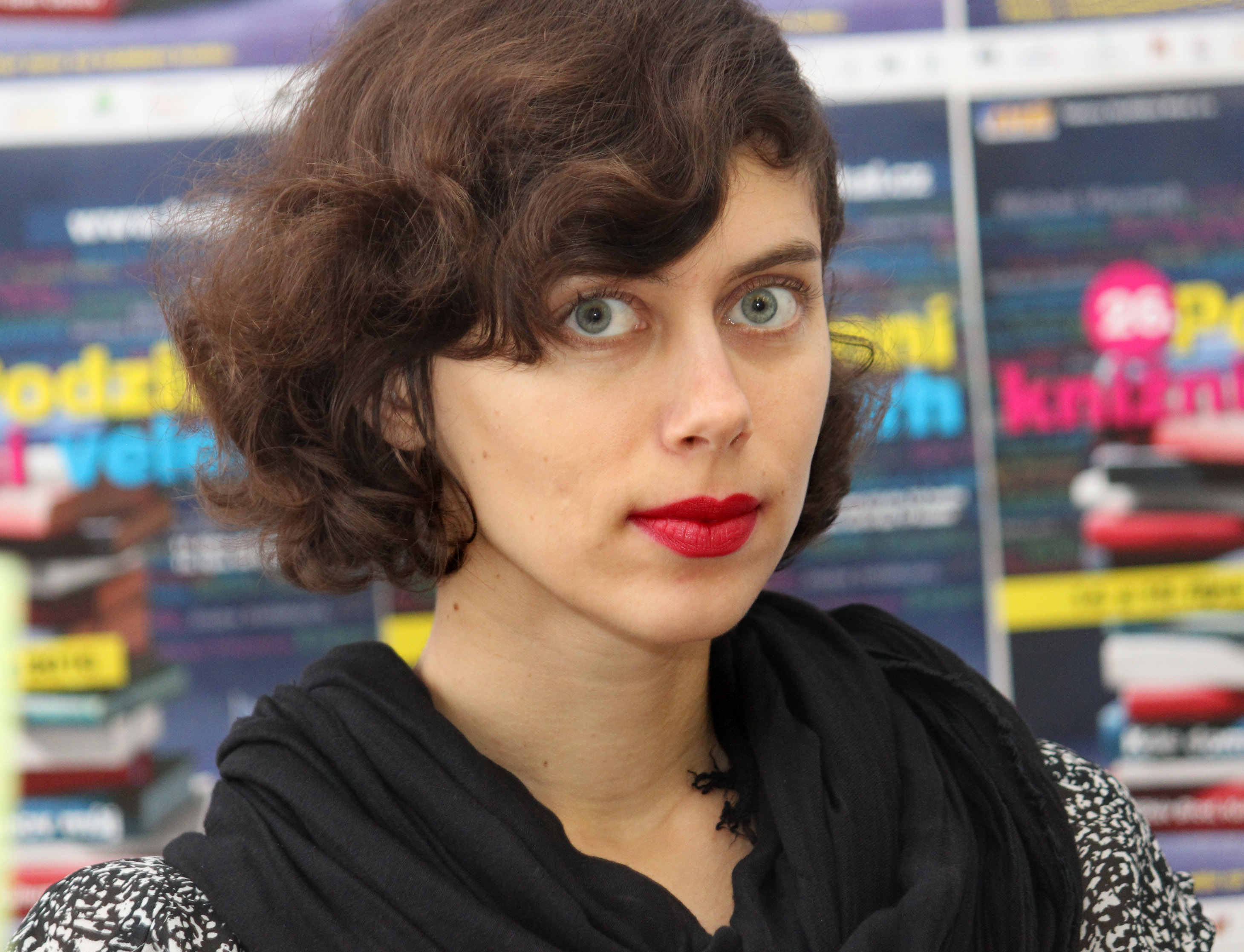
Sára Vybíralová in 2016

Sára Vybíralová (born 27 March 1986) is a Czech writer, translator from French, and editor.

== Life and career ==
Sára Vybíralová was born in Brno, Czechoslovakia, on 27 March 1986. She studied French and History at the Faculty of Philosophy of the Charles University in Prague, Czech Republic. Her debut novel Spoušť received the 2016 Jiří Orten Award given to the author of a work of prose or poetry who is no older than 30 at the time of the work's completion.

== Awards ==
- 2016 Jiří Orten Award

== Bibliography ==
- Spoušť. Brno: Host, 2015. ISBN 9788074914942.

== Translations from French into Czech ==
- Édouard Levé: Suicide, 2008. ISBN 9782846822367. Czech edition: Sebevražda. Rubato, 2015. ISBN 9788087705308.
- Édouard Levé: Oeuvres, 2002. ISBN 9782867449109. Czech edition: Díla. Rubato, 2016, ISBN 9788087705407.
- Leila Slimani: Chanson douce, 2016. ISBN 9782070196678. Czech edition: Něžná píseň. Argo, 2017. ISBN 9788025721421.
- Liliane Giraudon: Fur: nouvelles, 1992. ISBN 9782867442957. Czech edition: Srstí. Rubato, 2017. ISBN 9788087705520.
- Leila Slimani: Paroles d'honneur, 2017. ISBN 9782352046547. Czech edition: Sex a lži. Argo, 2019. ISBN 9788025727386.
- Édouard Louis: Qui a tué mon père, 2018. ISBN 9782021399431. Czech edition: Kdo zabil mého otce. Paseka, 2021. ISBN 9788076372207.
