= Jiří Orten Award =

Czech literature award

The Jiří Orten Award is a Czech literary prize given to the author of a work of prose or poetry who is no older than 30 at the time of the work's completion. The award is named after Czech poet Jiří Orten. The winner is awarded a prize of 50,000 Czech koruna. The award is decided by a five-member jury, whose members are appointed each year by the Association of Czech Booksellers and Publishers.

== Laureates ==
Year	Author	Awarded Work	Reference
2024	Marek Torčík	For the novel Rozložíš paměť (Praha: Paseka, 2023 ISBN 9788076373990.)	
2023	Filip Klega	For the book of poetry Andrstán (Brno: Větrné mlýny, 2022 ISBN 9788074434570.)	
2022	Vojtěch Vacek	For the book of poetry Měňagon (Červený Kostelec : Pavel Mervart, 2021. ISBN 9788074654978.)	
2021	Šimon Leitgeb	For the book of poetry Betonová pláž (JT´s nakladatelství, 2020. ISBN 9788090750449.)	
2020	Hana Lehečková	For the novella Svatá hlava (Vyšehrad, 2019. ISBN 9788076011014.)	
2019	Anna Cima	For the novel Probudím se na Šibuji (Paseka, 2018. ISBN 9788074329128.)	
2018	Ondřej Macl	For the book of poetry Miluji svou babičku víc než mladé dívky (Dauphin, 2017. ISBN 9788072729661.)	
2017	Zuzana Kultánová	For the novel Augustin Zimmerman	
2016	Sára Vybíralová	For the novel Spoušť. (Brno: Host, 2015. ISBN 9788074914942.)	
2015	Alžběta Stančáková	For the book of poetry Co s tím (Prague: Nakladatelství Petr Štengl, 2014. ISBN 9788087563229.)	
2014	Ondřej Hanus	For the book of poetry Výjevy (Brno: Host, 2013. ISBN 9788072947003.)	
2013	Ondřej Buddeus	For the book of poetry Rorýsy (Prague: Fra, 2012. ISBN 9788087429310)	
2012	Vratislav Maňák	Šaty z igelitu	
2011	Františka Jirousová	Vyhnanci	
2010	Jan Těsnohlídek ml.	Násilí bez předsudků	
2009	Jana Šrámková	Hruškadóttir	
2008	Petra Soukupová	K moři	
2007	Petra Hůlová	Umělohmotný třípokoj	
2007	Jonáš Hájek	Suť	
2006	Marek Šindelka	Strychnin a jiné básně	
2005	Kateřina Kováčová	Hnízda	
2004	Marie Šťastná	Krajina s Ofélií	
2003	Radek Malý	Vraní zpěvy	
2002	Martin Langer	Pití octa	
2002	Jaroslav Rudiš	Nebe pod Berlínem	
2001	No prize awarded.		-
2000	Věra Rosí	Holý bílý kmen	
1999	Pavel Brycz	Jsem město	
1998	Bogdan Trojak	Pan Twardowski	
1997	Jan Jandourek	For the poetry collection V jámě lvové	
1996	Božena Správcová	For the poetry collection Výmluva	
1995	Petr Borkovec	Ochoz	
1994	Jaromír Typlt	Ztracené peklo	
1993	Michal Viewegh	For the novel Báječná léta pod psa	
1992	Jaroslav Pížl	For the poetry collection Manévry	
1991	Vít Kremlička	Lodní deník	
1990	Tereza Boučková	Indiánský běh	
1989	Petr Placák	Medorek	
1988	Martin Milan Šimečka	Žabí rok	
1987	Zuzana Brabcová	Daleko od stromu	

== See also ==
- List of Czech literary awards
