= Jan Těsnohlídek =

Czech poet, writer, editor and publisher (born 1987)

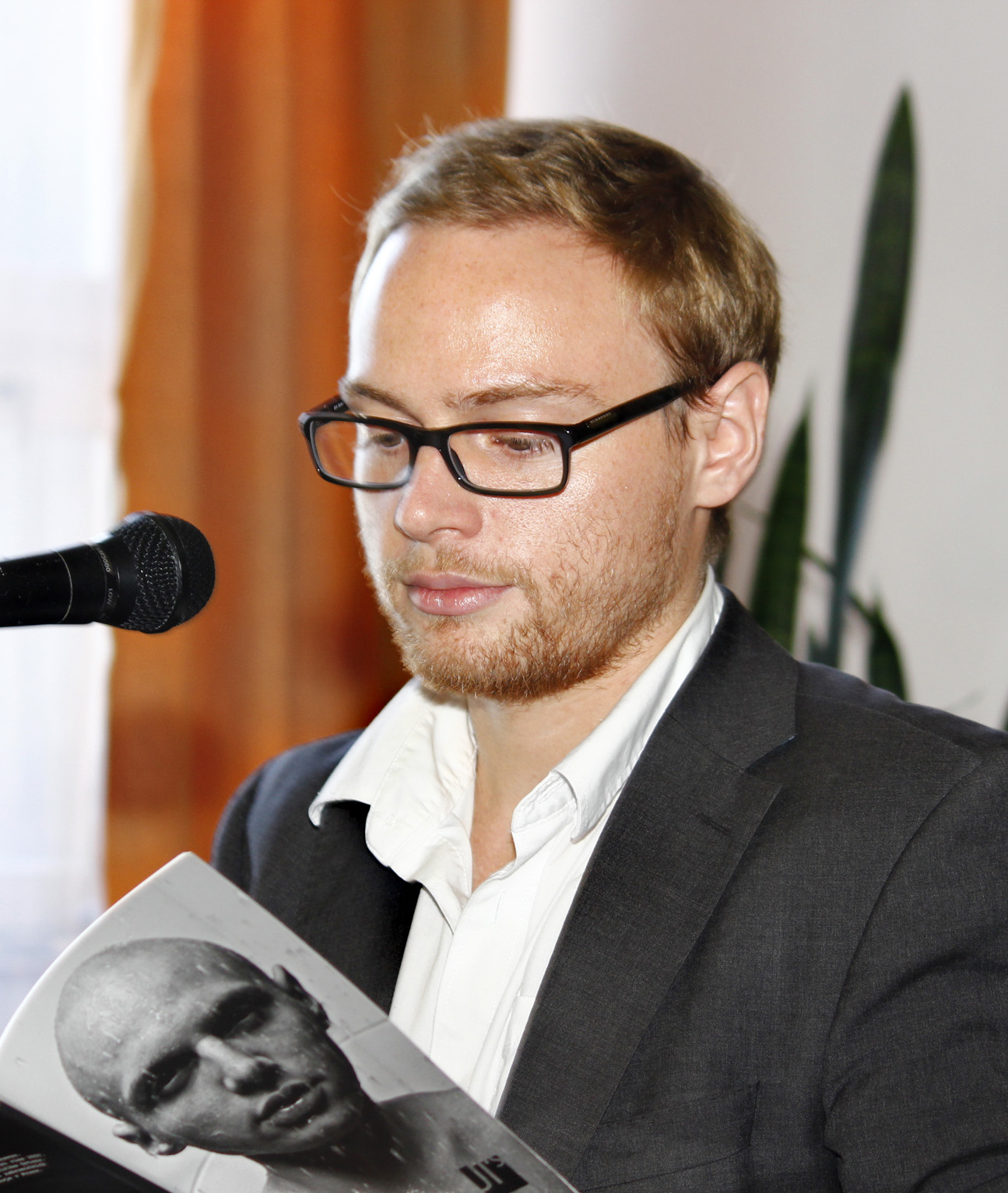
- Jan Těsnohlídek in 2012
- Born: 11 April 1987 (age 39); Havlíčkův Brod, Czechoslovakia
- Citizenship: Czech Republic

Jan Těsnohlídek (born 11 April 1987) is a Czech poet, writer, editor and publisher.

== Life ==
Těsnohlídek was born on 11 April 1987 in Havlíčkův Brod, Czechoslovakia. After K. V. Rais gymnasium in Hlinsko he moved to Prague, where he briefly studied library studies and information studies at the Faculty of Arts of Charles University in Prague. From 2008 to 2011, he was editor and deputy editor of the magazine for contemporary poetry Psí víno. In 2009, he founded with Petr Štengl publishing house called Petr Štengl, and in 2011 he established his own publishing house JT's. His poems have been translated into English, German, Italian, Finnish, Slovenian, Spain, Dutch and Polish, and printed in Czech and foreign journals and anthologies. He cooperated with music bands Umakart and Lesní zvěř. In 2009 he started to organize and since 2011 he is an appointed judge of the literary competition for young poets called Competition Ortenova Kutná Hora. He is the youngest member of Czech PEN Club. From 2012 to 2016 he lived in Kraków, Poland.

== Awards ==
Těsnohlídek was awarded in a number of literary competitions for young writers (among others Ortenova Kutná Hora 2005–2008, Hořovice Václava Hraběte 2006, 2008). His poems were included in the book Best Czech Poems 2009 and 2013. For his debut collection of poems Násilí bez předsudků (Violence without prejudice) he won the 2010 Jiří Orten Award. In 2010 he received one-month-long scholarship in Jyväskylä, Finland. He also received scholarships in Kraków, Poland (2012) and in Prague, Czech Republic (2016) from the International Visegrad Fund.

== Work ==
- Violence without prejudice (Násilí bez předsudků), Psí víno Publishing, 2009, ISBN 978-80-904162-5-3 - a collection of poems
- Violence without prejudice (Násilí bez předsudků), 2nd edition, Petr Štengl Publishing, 2009, ISBN 978-80-904162-6-0 - a collection of poems
- Cancer(Rakovina), JT's Publishing, 2011, ISBN 978-80-905022-1-5 - a collection of poems
- ADA, JT's Publishing, 2012, ISBN 978-80-905022-7-7 - novel
- Still something left to lose(Ještě je co ztratit), JT's Publishing, 2013, ISBN 978-80-905022-8-4 - a collection of poems
- Violence without prejudice (Násilí bez předsudků), 3rd edition, JT's Publishing, 2016, ISBN 978-80-905633-2-2 - a collection of poems
- Save yourself first (Hlavně zachraň sebe), JT's Publishing, 2016, ISBN 978-80-905633-4-6 - a collection of poems
- Poems 2005 - 2013 (Básně 2005 - 2013), Nakladatelství Knihovna Polička, 2017, ISBN 978-80-906832-0-4 - collected poems, contains 4th edition of Violence without prejudice, 2nd edition of Cancer and 2nd edition of Still something left to lose
