= Výchova dívek v Čechách =

1994 novel by Michal Viewegh

First edition

Výchova dívek v Čechách is a Czech novel, written by Michal Viewegh. It was first published in 1994, and translated into English by A. G. Brain (pseudonym of Gerald Turner) as Bringing up Girls in Bohemia in 1996, ISBN 1-887378-05-7. The book was made into a film in 1997.
