= Lekce tvůrčího psaní =

The Creative Writing Lesson
- Author: Michal Viewegh
- Original title: Lekce tvůrčího psaní
- Language: Czech
- Genre: Psychological fiction novella
- Publisher: Petrov
- Publication date: 2005
- Pages: 140
- ISBN: 80-7227-223-3

Lekce tvůrčího psaní (The Creative Writing Lesson) is a Czech psychological novella, written by Michal Viewegh. It was first published in 2005. A Slovenian edition was published in 2010.
