= The Case of Unfaithful Klara (film) =

2009 film directed by Roberto Faenza

- Directed by: Roberto Faenza
- Cinematography: Maurizio Calvesi
- Music by: Gianni Venosta
- Release date: 2009
- Running time: 90 minutes
- Language: English

The Case of Unfaithful Klara (Italian: Il caso dell'infedele Klara, Czech: Případ nevěrné Kláry) is a 2009 Italian-Czech romance-drama film directed by Roberto Faenza. It is loosely based on the novel with the same name by Michal Viewegh.

== Plot ==
Luca, an Italian musician who lives in Prague as a music teacher at an elementary school, is in the grip of uncontrollable jealousy for his girlfriend Klara, an art history student about to graduate. Suspicious of the ambiguous relationship that the girl has with Pavel, her tutor at the university, Luca assigns a detective, Denis, to control her. After the first stalking, carried out with the help of sophisticated technologies, the detective decides to hide some evidence that he considers unimportant, almost as if he wants to protect his client from tormenting himself by unnecessary and unfounded suspicions. Thus begins a refined game of the parts between the two men that will lead them to contaminate each other: the one will transfer into the other elements and feelings that he did not know before. Denis, who lives an extremely open relationship with his wife Ruth and is in love with Nina, his assistant in the agency, loses serenity and professional "detachment". While Luca, engulfed by his passion for Klara, becomes patient and calculating, prompting the detective to follow Klara one last time on a study trip to Venice where Pavel is also present. Here, in disguise, Denis will get to know Klara and end up discovering a singular truth.

== Cast ==
- Laura Chiatti: Klara
- Claudio Santamaria: Luca
- Iain Glen: Denis
- Kierston Wareing: Nina
- Pavlína Němcová: Ruth
- Aňa Geislerová: Professor Smidt
- Miroslav Šimůnek: Pavel

== Production ==
Director Roberto Faenza said in the bathtub sex scene between Laura Chiatti and Claudio Santamaria he left the actors completely alone. "The crew was outside their room and inside there was a camera left alone with the actors, and maneuvered through a hole, so that they did not feel they were being watched. It was like they were actually having sex with each other," Faenza said.
