= Petra Soukupová =

Czech author, playwright and screenwriter

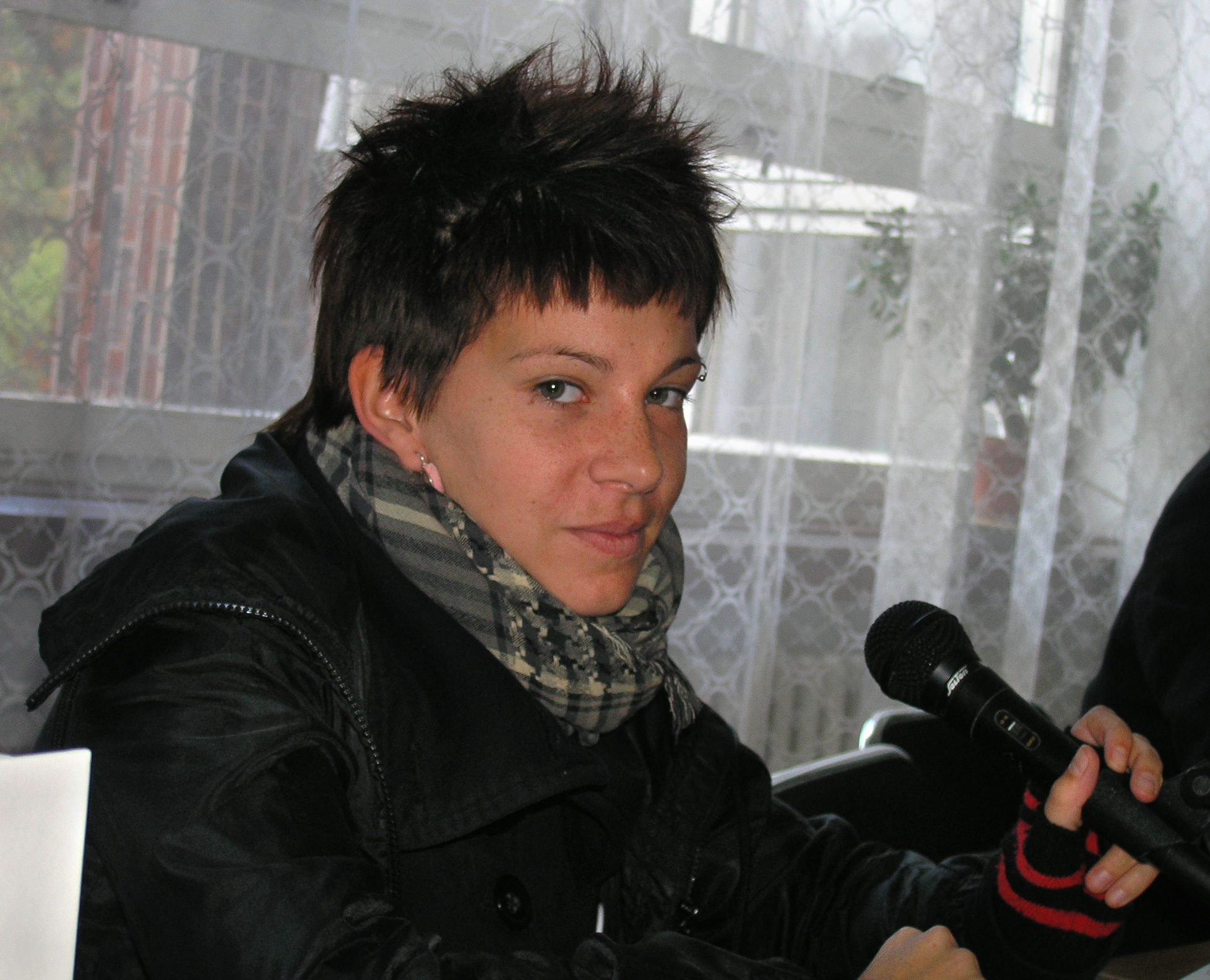
Petra Soukupová at the Autumn Book Fair in Havlíčkův Brod, Czech Republic in 2011.

Petra Soukupová (born 25 July 1982) is a contemporary Czech author, playwright, and screenwriter.

== Life and career ==
Petra Soukupová was born on 25 July 1982 in Česká Lípa, Czechoslovakia. She studied screenwriting and dramaturgy at the Film and TV School of the Academy of Performing Arts (FAMU) in Prague. She is the author of five books for adults and two children's books. She was a screenwriter on the sitcom Comeback (2008-2010) and the series Kosmo (2016). Petra Soukupová lives and works in Prague.

== Awards ==
- 2008 Jiří Orten Award
- 2010 Magnesia Litera Award for Book of the Year

== Bibliography ==
- K moři. Brno: Host, 2007. ISBN 9788072942343
- Zmizet. Brno: Host, 2009. ISBN 9788072943173.
- Marta v roce vetřelce. Brno: Host, 2011. ISBN 9788072945214
- Pod sněhem. Brno: Host, 2015. ISBN 9788074914935
- Nejlepší pro všechny. Brno: Host, 2017. ISBN 9788075774002

Children's Books

- Bertík a čmuchadlo. Brno: Host, 2014. ISBN 9788074912481
- Kdo zabil Snížka? Brno: Host, 2017. ISBN 9788075772268
