= Hospodářské noviny =

Czech newspaper

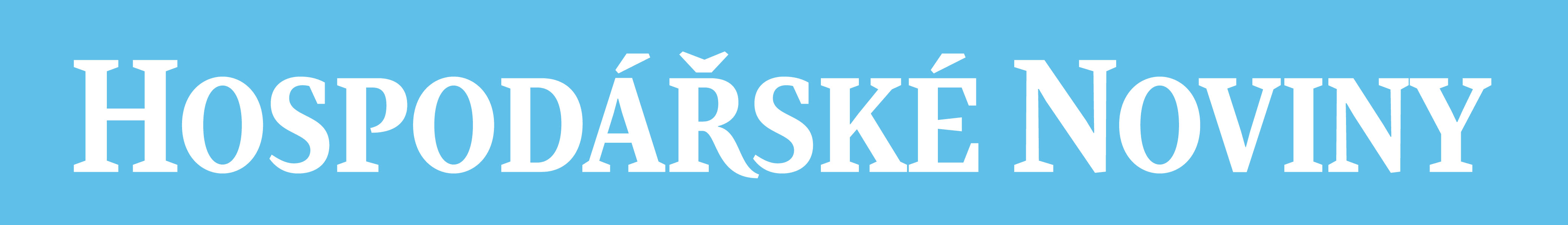

- The 9 December 2010 front page of Hospodářské noviny
- Type: Daily newspaper
- Format: Broadsheet
- Publisher: Economia
- Founded: 21 May 1990; 36 years ago
- Political alignment: Centre-right
- Language: Czech
- Headquarters: Dobrovského 25, Prague
- Country: Czech Republic
- Circulation: 43,000 (as of 2013)
- ISSN: 0862-9587
- Website: hn.ihned.cz

Hospodářské noviny (lit. 'Economic Newspaper') is a national daily newspaper published in the Czech Republic.

== History and profile ==
Hospodářské noviny was first published on 21 May 1990. The paper is headquartered in Prague and has a specific focus on economics. The founder and publisher is a joint company, Economia which is owned by Zdeněk Bakala since 2008. It is published in broadsheet format.

== Circulation ==
The circulation of Hospodářské noviny was 75,000 copies in 2002. In October 2003 the paper had a circulation of 74,195 copies. The circulation of the paper was 66,024 copies in December 2004. It was 67,000 copies for 2004 as a whole.

The 2007 circulation of the paper was 58,783 copies. The circulation of Hospodářské noviny was 57,390 copies in 2008 and 54,285 copies in 2009. It was 44,225 copies in 2010 and 41,933 copies in 2011. As of September 2013 it was the 9th most widely circulated newspaper in the country with the circulation of 43,000 copies.

== See also ==
- List of newspapers in the Czech Republic
- Concentration of media ownership in the Czech Republic
