= Rastislav Bakala =

Slovak football midfielder

Personal information
- Full name: Rastislav Bakala
- Date of birth: 22 April 1990 (age 36)
- Place of birth: Čadca, Czechoslovakia
- Height: 1.82 m (5 ft 11 1/2 in)
- Position: Midfielder

Team information
- Current team: ŠK SFM Senec
- Number: 5

Youth career
- 1998–2001: TJ Snaha Zborov nad Bystricou
- 1996–2007: Inter Bratislava
- 2008–2009: SK Dynamo České Budějovice

Senior career*
Years	Team	Apps	(Gls)
2009–2012	České Budějovice	10	(0)
2013–	Dolný Kubín	14	(1)
2013–	→SFM Senec (loan)	5	(1)
- * Club domestic league appearances and goals as of 31 August 2013

Rastislav Bakala (born 22 April 1990 in Čadca) is a Slovak football midfielder who currently plays for ŠK SFM Senec.

== SK Dynamo České Budějovice ==
In winter 2008, he joined Czech club SK Dynamo České Budějovice. He made his debut for SK Dynamo České Budějovice against FC Baník Ostrava on 17 May 2009.
