= New World Resources =

New World Resources Plc
- Type: Public (LSE: NWR), PSE, WSE
- ISIN: GB00B42CTW68
- Industry: Mining
- Headquarters: Amsterdam, Netherlands
- Key people: Gareth Penny (Executive Chairman)
- Revenue: €676 million (2014)
- Operating income: €56 million (2012)
- Net income: €(1) million (2012)
- Number of employees: 17,000 inc. contractors
- Website: newworldresources.eu

New World Resources Plc ('NWR') was one of Central Europe's hard coal and coke producer. The company produced coking and thermal coal for the steel and energy sectors in Central Europe through its subsidiary OKD, the largest hard coal mining company in the Czech Republic.

NWR NV became listed on the London and Prague stock exchanges in 2008, the largest initial public offering on the LSE that year as well as the only listing on the PSE. NWR is listed in London, Prague and Warsaw. It is a constituent of FTSE Small Cap Index.

Following substantial continuing losses in 2013, 2014 and 2015, the company shares traded at the end of 2015 at 0.18 CZK (0.03% of their original value).

== History ==
Regular mining activities in Silesia in the northeast region of the Czech Crown lands commenced in 1782 and were then nationalized in 1946. The company was established on privatisation of elements of the coal industry of the Czech Republic which started in 1994; in 2004 46% of the business was bought up by Karbon Invest which itself was acquired by RPG Group (owned by Mr Zdenek Bakala, a Czech billionaire), shortly thereafter. In 2005 the coal and coke businesses of that company were restructured as New World Resources B.V. and were the subject of an initial public offering as New World Resources N.V. in 2008. In 2013 NWR sold its coke subsidiary, OKK Koksovny, a.s.

In September 2018, Bakala filed a lawsuit in federal court in Beaufort, South Carolina in which he claims that a controversional Slovak businessman Pavol Krúpa has initiated frivolous lawsuits, promoted death threats on Facebook and instigated criminal investigations targeting him. The lawsuit also says that Krupa threatened to send soccer hooligans to protest in front of Bakala's home in Switzerland and ultimately demanded a payment of 500 million Czech koruna (US$23 million) in 2017, as a compensation for losses suffered by buying the New World Resources stock, to stop. According to the complaint, when Bakala rejected that offer, Krupa hired Beverly Hills, California-based Crowds on Demand “to bring his campaign of defamation, extortion, and harassment to the U.S.”

== Operations ==
The company's main operations comprised OKD (a coal mining business) and NWR KARBONIA (a Polish coal and coke business). It mined in the Moravian-Silesian Region of the Czech Republic in the Ostrava Basin and has two development projects in Poland.

According to its website, NWR had 58 million tonnes and 186 million tonnes of Joint Ore Reserves Committee reserves in the Czech Republic and Poland, respectively, and, headquartered in the Netherlands, it employed 14,000 people (incl. contractors).

According to its website, NWR supplied to a blue chip customer base in the region, major customers include ArcelorMittal, ČEZ, Veolia Energie, Moravia Steel, U. S. Steel Košice, Verbund, voestalpine and ThyssenKrupp.

== See also ==
- Energy in the Czech Republic
