= University of Ostrava =

Public university in the Czech Republic

- Ostravská univerzita
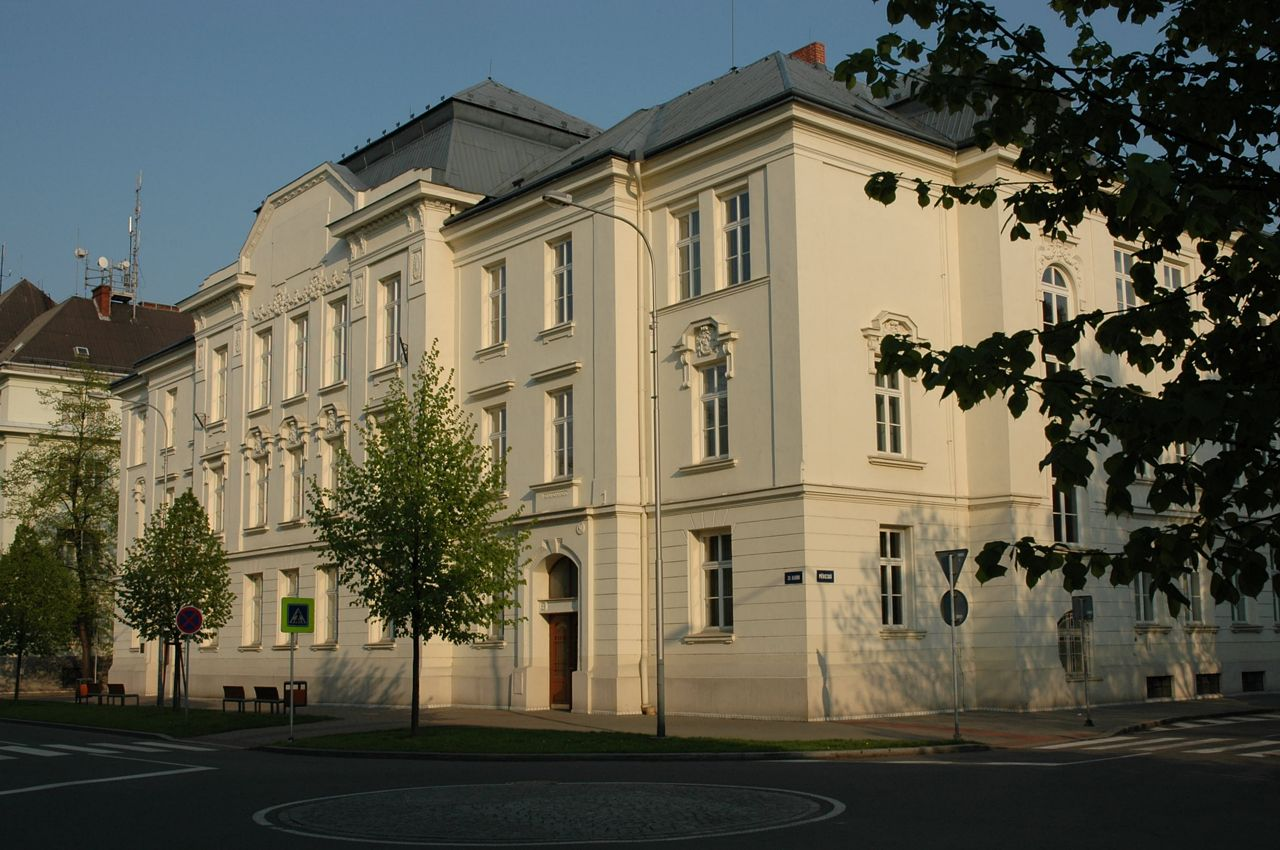
- Faculty of Science
- Type: Public
- Established: 1991
- Rector: Petr Kopecký
- Administrative staff: 833
- Students: 8,543
- Doctoral students: 263
- Location: Ostrava, Czech Republic; 49°50′17.61″N 18°17′26.57″E
- Campus: Urban
- Website: https://www.osu.eu/

University rankings

Regional – Overall
- QS Emerging Europe and Central Asia: 148 (2022)

The University of Ostrava (Czech Ostravská univerzita) is a public university in the city of Ostrava, Moravian-Silesian Region, Czech Republic. Founded in 1991, it is the newest public university in Ostrava. It consists of six faculties and two institutes providing university education.

== History ==
The University of Ostrava was founded on 28 September 1991. Its origins can be traced back to 1953, when a training college for future primary school teachers was opened in the nearby town of Opava. In 1959, all teacher training within the region was streamlined into a single institution – the newly established Pedagogical Institute in Ostrava. Five years later, the institute was awarded university status and became an independent Faculty of Education, offering four-year degree courses to future primary school teachers. The range of degrees was later extended to include a five-year programme for future teachers of higher year groups. Gradually, other faculties, departments and research centres joined the University of Ostrava, shifting the focus from teachers to research and innovation in general.

== Faculty of Medicine ==
The Faculty of Medicine was established in 2010. Its history is closely connected with the Medical-Social Faculty of the University of Ostrava, which was founded in 1993. In 2008 the Medical-Social Faculty was divided into two faculties: the Faculty of Social Studies and the Faculty of Health Studies. The Faculty of Health Studies was renamed as the Medical Faculty on 1 September 2010.

== Rectors ==
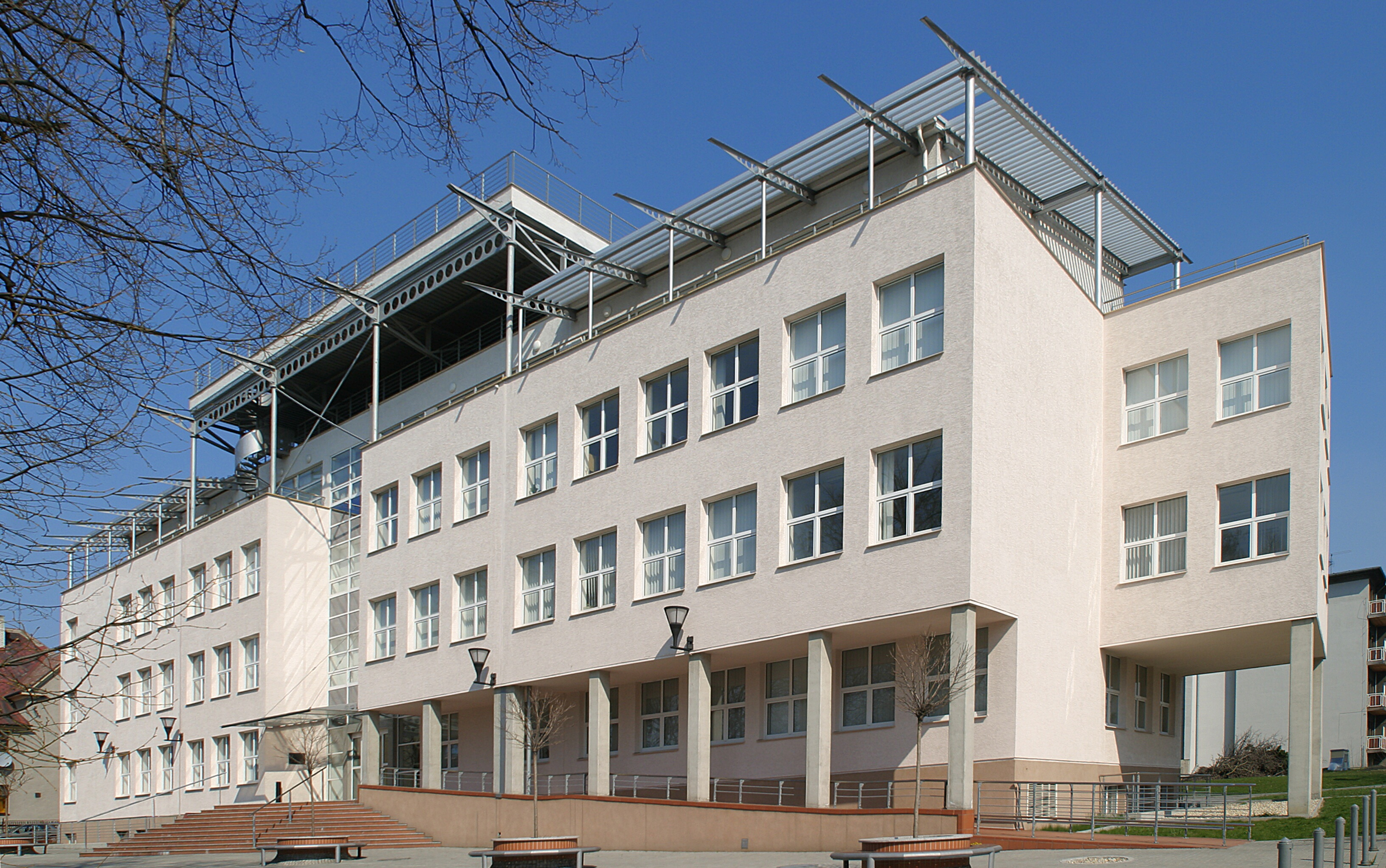
Faculty of Science Building

rector's name	term of office	appointed by
prof. PhDr. Jaroslav Hubáček, CSc.	1991–1995	Václav Havel
prof. RNDr. Jiří Močkoř, DrSc.	1995–2001	Václav Havel
doc. Ing. Petr Pánek, CSc.	2001–2004	Václav Havel
doc. RNDr. Vladimír Baar, CSc.	2004–2007	Václav Klaus
prof. RNDr. Jiří Močkoř, DrSc.	2007–2015	Václav Klaus
prof. MUDr. Jan Lata, CSc.	2015 – 2023	Miloš Zeman
doc. Mgr. Petr Kopecký, Ph.D.	2023 – till now	Miloš Zeman

== Rankings ==
University rankings

Global – Overall
- THE World: 801-1000

In 2017, Times Higher Education ranked the university in the 801-1000 band globally.
