= Respekt =

Czech weekly news magazine

- 27 February 2017 issue of Respekt
- Editor: Erik Tabery
- Categories: Investigative journalism, politics, economy, science, culture
- Frequency: Weekly
- Publisher: Respekt Media
- First issue: 18 November 1989; 36 years ago
- Country: Czech Republic
- Based in: Prague
- Language: Czech
- Website: respekt.cz
- ISSN: 0862-6545

Respekt is a Czech weekly news magazine published in Prague, the Czech Republic, reporting on domestic and foreign political and economic issues, as well as on science and culture.

== History and profile ==
Respekt's first cover (14 March 1990)

Respekt was founded soon after the fall of Communist party from power in 1989 by a group of samizdat journalists as one of the first independent magazines. It is the successor of Informační servis (lit. 'Information service'), an opposition samizdat paper. Respekt is published weekly and has its headquarters in Prague. The New York Times describes Respekt as "influential".

In 2005, Respekt published details about business connection between Prime Minister Stanislav Gross' wife and a brothel owner, starting a scandal leading to downfall of Gross several months later; in 2008 it published an article alleging that Milan Kundera, when a student, denounced to the police a Czech spy for the West.

The circulation of the weekly magazine peaked at over 100,000 copies in the middle of the 1990s. At this time, the (loss generating) weekly was bought by Karel Schwarzenberg's R-Presse. The circulation has been dropping steady over the time causing Respekt's losses to increase to 7 million Czk in 2003. In 2006, Zdeněk Bakala obtained majority in Respekt and planned to eliminate the loss by making the journal more mainstream. The proposed changes led to fear among both readers and the editors that the unique flavour of the weekly will be destroyed. Later that September, all editors threatened to leave.

=== Legal actions ===
Since Respekt regularly reports on its investigations into bribery scandals, criminal activity or government mishandling, legal action have been periodically taken against it – often by top level politicians. Most of these cases that have gone to court have been won by the magazine. The most visible case was the Czech government's 2001 attempt to sue Respekt for libel. Miloš Zeman, the instigator of the case, saw it as a way to end the journal. The case fizzled away only embarrassing the government.

=== Editors in chief ===
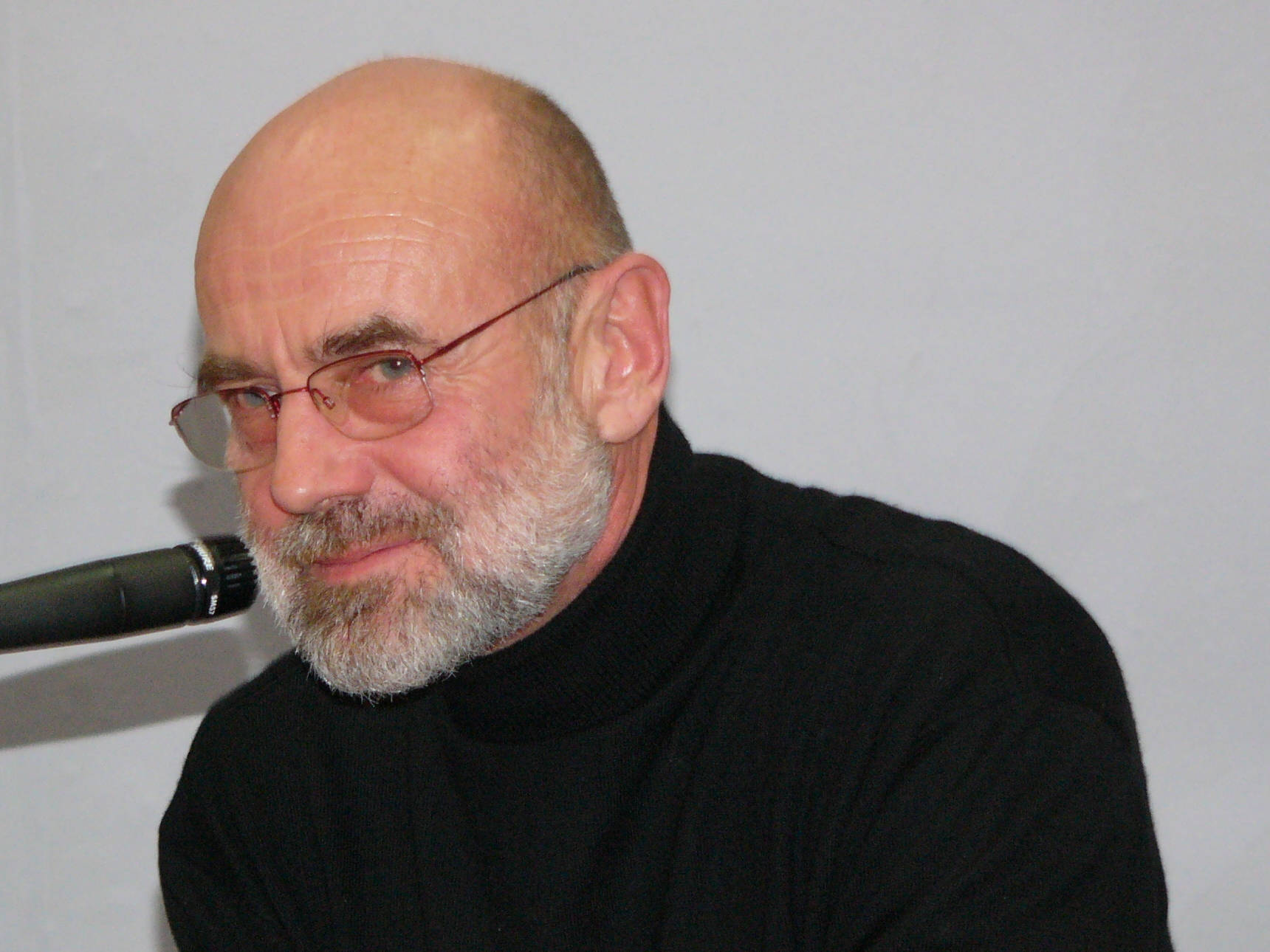
Charter 77 signatory and the first editor of Respekt, Jan Ruml

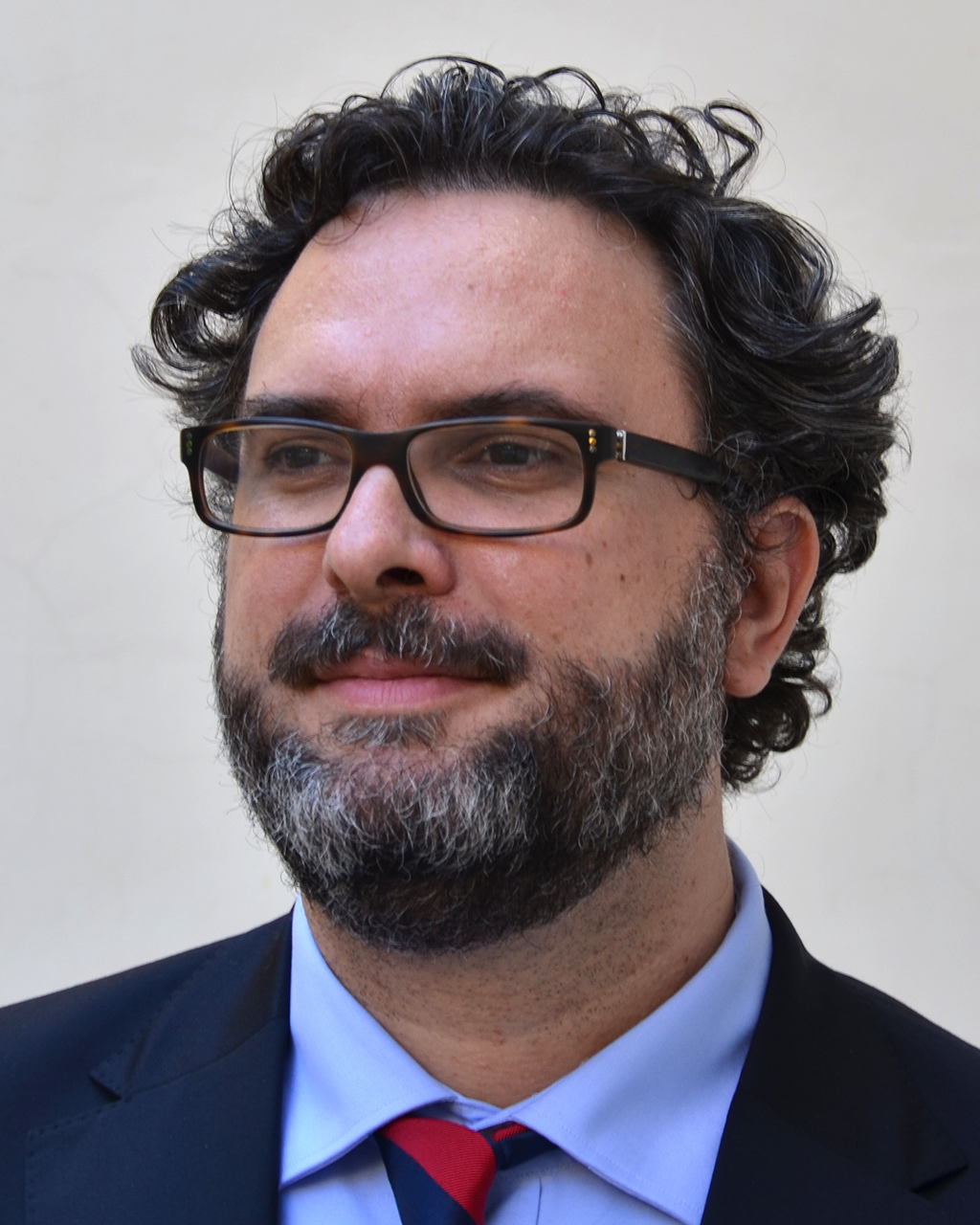
Erik Tabery was appointed editor-in-chief in 2009

- Jan Ruml (1990)
- Ivan Lamper (1990–1994)
- Vladimír Mlynář (1994–1997)
- Martin Fendrych (1998)
- Petr Holub (1998–2002)
- Tomáš Němeček (2003–2005)
- Marek Švehla (2005–2006)
- Martin Milan Šimečka (2006–2009)
- Erik Tabery (2009–present)

== Visual style ==
In September 2007, the colored print format replaced the black-white photos as the advertisement section was expanded.
