= Bakala Foundation =

Czech foundation that supports education

Nadace The Bakala Foundation
- Formation: 2007; 19 years ago
- Founder: Zdeněk Bakala
- Purpose: Education
- Headquarters: Prague, Czech Republic
- Location(s): Tržiště 366/13, 118 00 Praha 1 - Malá Strana
- Key people: Michaela Bakala, Chair of the Board of Trustees; Pepper de Callier, Chair of the Supervisory Board; Václav Pecha, Managing Director
- Website: bakalafoundation.org

The Bakala Foundation is a family foundation established by Zdeněk Bakala and Michaela Bakala. It was founded in the Czech Republic in 2007 originally as Zdeněk Bakala Foundation (in Czech "Nadace Zdeňka Bakaly") and renamed The Bakala Foundation in 2014. The foundation’s main focus is on education. Through the Scholarship program, Bakala Foundation supports the attendance of Czech students at universities abroad. It has also financed other projects in the Czech Republic, such as the Kaplicky Internship for young architects or Achilles Data and Journey for young journalists.

== Programs ==
=== Scholarship ===
Through the Scholarship program, Czech students have an opportunity to obtain financial support in the form of a scholarship for their studies at foreign universities. Support is available both to students leaving secondary education and applying to study at a university and to students already at a university who need support to continue with their studies. Approximately 25 % of applicants seek education in the social sciences and humanities, about 20 % choose applied science and 10 % opt for art school. A majority of scholarship recipients study at universities in the United States – mostly at Harvard, Yale, Dartmouth College and other Ivy League institutions – and in the United Kingdom where they most often attend Cambridge or Oxford. The scholarship can cover their expenses including tuition, accommodation and living costs, with the exact amount depending on a range of factors. Upon meeting certain criteria, selected students may receive financial support for the complete duration of their course of study. The students’ scholarship applications include an essay, motivation letter and references. The shortlisted applicants are invited for a second round of selection consisting of an interview. In 2016, there were 213 scholarship applicants, 22 progressed into the second round and 13 were awarded a scholarship.

=== Kaplicky Internship ===
The Kaplicky Internship is a competition for students of architecture in which the main prize is a three-month internship with one of London’s big architectural studios. The competition, named after the late Czech architect Jan Kaplický, the is organised in collaboration with the Design Museum in London and the Kaplicky Centre Endowment Fund and is open to works submitted by final-year students of architecture curricula at Czech colleges and universities.

==== 2015 ====
The inaugural competition was won by Ondřej Michálek, a graduate of the Academy of Arts, Architecture and Design in Prague. The victory earned Ondřej Michálek an internship with the London-based studio of Eva Jiřičná. His winning design was inspired by the growth of mycelium and other living organisms. Subsequently, he examined the territorial implications of applying their rules of growth at a specific moment and in a certain location as the “Pavilion of Growth”.

==== 2016 ====
The winner in the competition’s second year was Petra Ross, a graduate from the Faculty of Arts and Architecture of the Technical University in Liberec. She won a three-month internship with the London studio of Zaha Hadid. The 2016 jury of experts comprised M. Arch, Melodie Leung from Zaha Hadid’s studio, Mr. Deyan Sudjic OBE, director of the Design Museum in London, and the project’s guarantor, doc. Ing. Arch. Vladimir Krátký from the Faculty of Architecture of the Czech Technical University (ČVUT).

=== Achilles Data ===
Achilles Data is a three-month course of investigative journalism designed for students and media graduates from the Czech Republic.

=== Journey – Journalism Bootcamp ===
Journey is an intensive international journalism course for media students from the Czech Republic and other countries. Journey's workshops are concerned with data collection and analysis, and reporting. Lecturers have included Seymour Hersh, Jesse Eisinger, Charles Ornstein and Tracy Weber.

== Other philanthropic activities ==
The Bakalas have supported a number of nonprofit organisations in the Czech Republic and abroad, such as The Aspen Institute Central Europe, Václav Havel Library, the Centre for Contemporary Art DOX in Prague and London's Design Museum.
