= OKD =

Company in the Czech Republic

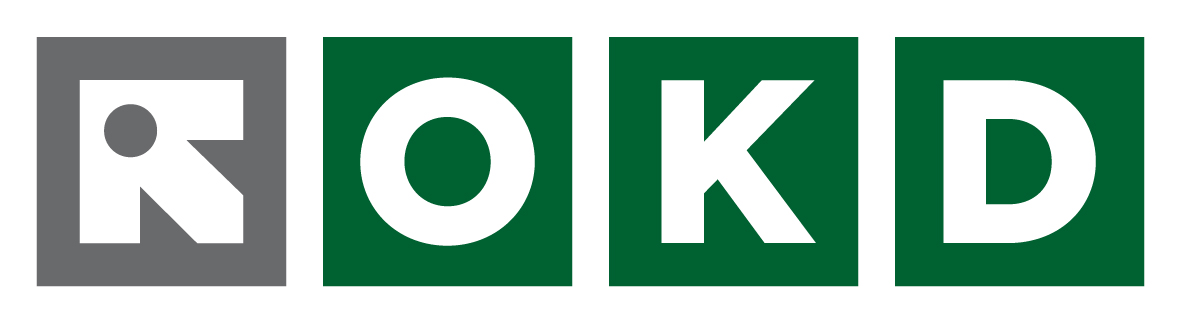
- Type: joint stock company
- Industry: Mining
- Predecessor: Správa pohledávek OKD
- Founded: 1952
- Headquarters: Stonava, Czech Republic
- Key people: Roman Sikora, Managing director
- Products: Hard coal
- Revenue: CZK 27.4 billion (2014)
- Operating income: 562,680,000 Czech koruna (2024)
- Net income: 1,029,740,000 Czech koruna (2024)
- Total assets: 14,233,943,000 Czech koruna (2024)
- Owner: State company Prisko
- Number of employees: 10,099 (2014)
- Website: www.okd.cz

OKD (Czech: Ostravsko-karvinské doly, lit. 'Ostrava-Karviná mines') is a major mining company in the Czech Republic, the only producer of hard coal in the country with an annual production of around 8-9 million tonnes from 4 mines with 23 shafts extracting coal from depths ranging from 600 to 1,300 metres below the surface.

Its coal is mined in the Karviná basin in the southern part of the Upper-Silesian coal basin (operations in the Ostrava basin were stopped in early 1990s). The Company produces quality coking and thermal coal for the steel and energy markets in Central Europe.

OKD controls a subsidiary, OKD, HBZS, a.s. (mining rescue service), which pursues activities related to coal mining.

OKD is one of the largest employers in the Moravian-Silesian Region. In 2011 on average 11,000 people worked for the company. OKD's subsidiary OKD, HBZS a.s. provided jobs for almost 200 people.

OKD was acquired by the state of the Czech Republic in April 2018 through the state company Prisko. At the end of February 2026 the company will close its last operating mine, bringing to an end hard coal mining in the entire country. It will then keep operating as a producer of energy blends and property developer.

== OKD in socialist Czechoslovakia ==
The foundations for the later OKD were established shortly after the Second World War when six existing mining companies were nationalized to form a state-owned company called Czech: Ostravsko-karvinské kamenouhelné doly.

The group actually encompassed a total of 32 mines, 9 coking plants, 10 mine power plants, the Třinec and Vítkovice steelworks, and several other industrial companies, and had a peak production of 24.7 million tons of coal recorded in 1980. State control of the company ended on January 1, 1991, when the company was wound up and a new joint-stock company, Ostravsko-karvinské doly (OKD), was established.

== OKD after 1989 (Velvet Revolution) ==
Thereafter, the newly created OKD, a.s. launched a restructuring process – both mining and surface operations were combined into larger business entities and units and OKD subsidiaries were established.

Fundamentals steps in the company, streamlining process included a swift closure of the Ostrava mines, the subsequent headcount reduction and a gradual privatization of the company. In the period from 1990 to 2001, mining activities were abandoned in the Ostrava and Petřvald part of the district on an area of 180 km2.

In 1998, the government sold its majority share in the company to Karbon Invest, a.s.. In autumn 2004, Karbon Invest, a.s. purchased another stake held by the state to become the primary shareholder. It was in the same year that the majority share of Karbon Invest, a.s. was acquired by RPG Industrie Ltd., an entity owned by a group of international institutional and private investors.

In December 2005, the OKD Board of Directors approved a proposal to split the company. Core (mining) activities were transferred to the successor joint-stock company OKD, a.s. Other activities, not related directly to the primary mining activities, were taken on by another set of companies.

An RPG Group restructuring process also continued. Hald coal mining and coke production in the Czech Republic and Poland were brought together under the umbrella of New World Resources, which became one of the leading coal producers in Central Europe. NWR pens 100% of OKD stock.

In spring 2008, NWR shares were successfully listed on stock exchanges in Prague, Warsaw and London. The move created the biggest ever IPO on the Prague Stock Exchange, while in London it formed one of the biggest IPOs of 2008.

In 2008 OKD started working on large investment programme – 'Productivity Optimisation Programme 2010 (‘POP 2010’). At an investment of approximately EUR 450 million, POP 2010 is one of the biggest projects of its kind in Europe. The primary objective of POP 2010 was to improve equipment performance by implementing state-of-the-art technology for longwall production and gateroad development. The investment includes the acquisition and installation of state-of-the-art machinery, coupled with an extensive training programme across all four active coal mines.

The company has also published the OKD Safety Policy, which emphasises management's priority placed on employee work safety. In September 2008, OKD unveiled its SAFETY 2010 programme. On a year-to-year comparison, the key safety and injury rate indicators at OKD sites in 2010 show favourable trends. The number of injuries decreased from the previous year's 346 to 248 in 2011, which represents a reduction of 28%. Company invested a further EUR 17 million into the purchase of the most modern personal protective equipment available.

In 2008 OKD renewed its long-standing support for mining education. OKD has renewed its collaboration with the Vocational School of Technology and Services in Karviná, the institution which has traditionally trained workers for the OKD mines, supporting the introduction of a new three-year curriculum to train mining operation specialists, such as U/G electricians and mechanics.

On 4 May 2016 OKD declared insolvency. In January 2026 it was reported the company will end it operation as a mining company and start producing energy blends using purchased coal and coal from its remaining stockpiles. OKD also plans to become a property developer in the Karviná district of Staré Město.

== Active coal mining operations ==
There are four active OKD hard coal mines: Karviná, Darkov, Paskov and ČSM. Reserves in these active mines total 195 million tonnes (as at 1 January 2012). Mining is carried out in the active part of the district in area of 133.65 km2 in nine face working areas.

Major customers include ArcelorMittal, ČEZ, Dalkia, Dunaferr, Moravia Steel, U.S. Steel, Verbund and voestalpine.

- Karviná Mine: Lazy and CSA mines were combined into one business unit named Karviná in 2008. In 2014 Production 3.048 million tonnes, reserves 20 million tonnes, coal type: Semi-Soft Coking/Hard Coking/Thermal. On 20 December 2018, 13 miners were killed and 10 more injured in a methane explosion there. Twelve of the fatalities were Poles. This was the worst mining disaster in the Czech Republic since 1990, when 30 miners died at a mine near Karvina.
- Darkov Mine: Mining in the area where the Darkov mine is located began in 1853 in the Gabriela mine. The Hohenegger and Austria mines began production in 1883 and 1907, respectively. These mines were merged in the 1950s. The Závod 2 site began operations in 1982. In 2014: production 2.195 million tonnes, reserves 9 million tonnes, coal type: Semi-Hard Coking/Thermal. In February 2021, the operating of the mine came to an end.
- ČSM Mine: The construction works for ČSM mine (also known as the Czechoslovak Youth Mine), located in Karviná began in 1958 and operations began in 1968. In 2014: production 2.236 million tonnes, reserves 26.5 million tonnes, coal type: Semi-Soft Coking/Hard Coking/Thermal. Situated in Stonava, Karviná, Albrechtice and Chotěbuz. This mine remained the last operating mine in the Czech Republic, and in January 2026 it was reported it will come to an end by late January.
- Paskov Mine: Paskov, with its one active site in Staric, is the only active mine in the Frýdek-Místek region. The original Paskov site was founded in 1961, began operations in 1965 and closed in 1999. The Staric site was founded in 1963 and began operations in 1970. In 1994, the Paskov and Staric sites were merged into Paskov. In 2014: production 862,000 tonnes, reserves 2.5 million tonnes, coal type: Hard Coking. Paskov Mine is very problematic. Paskov mine stopped being operational on 31 March 2017, as part of the decline of hard coal mining in Czechia.

== See also ==
- Energy in the Czech Republic
