= Czech State Award for Literature =

The Czech State Award for Literature (Czech: Státní cena za literaturu) is an award given by the Ministry of Culture of the Czech Republic. The Czech State Award for Literature is awarded for an original literary work in Czech published during the preceding year or in recognition of a lifetime's work of excellence. The prize consists of a certificate and 300,000 CZK. It is awarded each year on 28 October along with the Czech State Award for Translation.

== Laureates ==
Czech State Award for Literature

Year	Author	Awarded work	Reference
2024	Pavel Kolmačka	For the novel Canto ostinato. Triáda	
2023	Jiří Kratochvil	For the novel Škrtiči bohyně Kálí and for lifetime achievement.	
2022	Kateřina Tučková	For the novel Bílá Voda and for her body of work.	
2021	Miloslav Topinka	For his body of work.	
2020	Michal Ajvaz	For lifetime achievement.	
2019	Karol Sidon	For lifetime achievement.	
2018	Not awarded	Jiří Hájíček refused the award.	
2017	Jáchym Topol	For the novel Citlivý člověk and for lifetime achievement.	
2016	Petr Král	For the book of essays Vlastizrady and for lifetime achievement	
2015	Pavel Šrut	For his body of work to-date.	
2014	Patrik Ouředník	For his body of work to-date.	
2013	Petr Hruška	For the collection Darmata.	
2012	Ivan Wernisch	For his body of work to-date.	
2011	Daniela Hodrová	For the novel Vyvolávání.	
2010	Antonín Bajaja	For the novel Na krásné modré Dřevnici.	
2009	Zdeněk Rotrekl	For his body of work to-date.	
2008	Ludvík Vaculík	For his current literary and publicist work, and for Hodiny klavíru.	
2007	Milan Kundera	For the first Czech edition of the novel The Unbearable Lightness of Being, plus his prose and essay work to-date	
2006	Vladimír Körner	For Spisy Vladimíra Körnera.	
2005	Edgar Dutka	For Slečno, ras přichází.	
2004	Pavel Brycz	For Patriarchátu dávno zašlá sláva.	
2003	Petr Kabeš	For Těžítka, ta těžítka.	
2002	Květa Legátová	For her collection of short stories and essays Želary.	
2001	Věroslav Mertl	For Hřbitov snů.	
2000	Karel Šiktanc	For Šarlat.	
1999	Josef Škvorecký	For his extensive and significant work to-date.	
1998	Vladimír Macura	For Guvernantka a Český sen.	
1997	Milan Jankovič	For Kapitoly z poetiky Bohumila Hrabala.	-
1996	Emil Juliš	For Nevyhnutelnosti.	
1995	Ivan Diviš	For Teorie spolehlivosti.	-

== See also ==
- List of Czech literary awards
