= Petr Hruška (poet) =

Czech poet

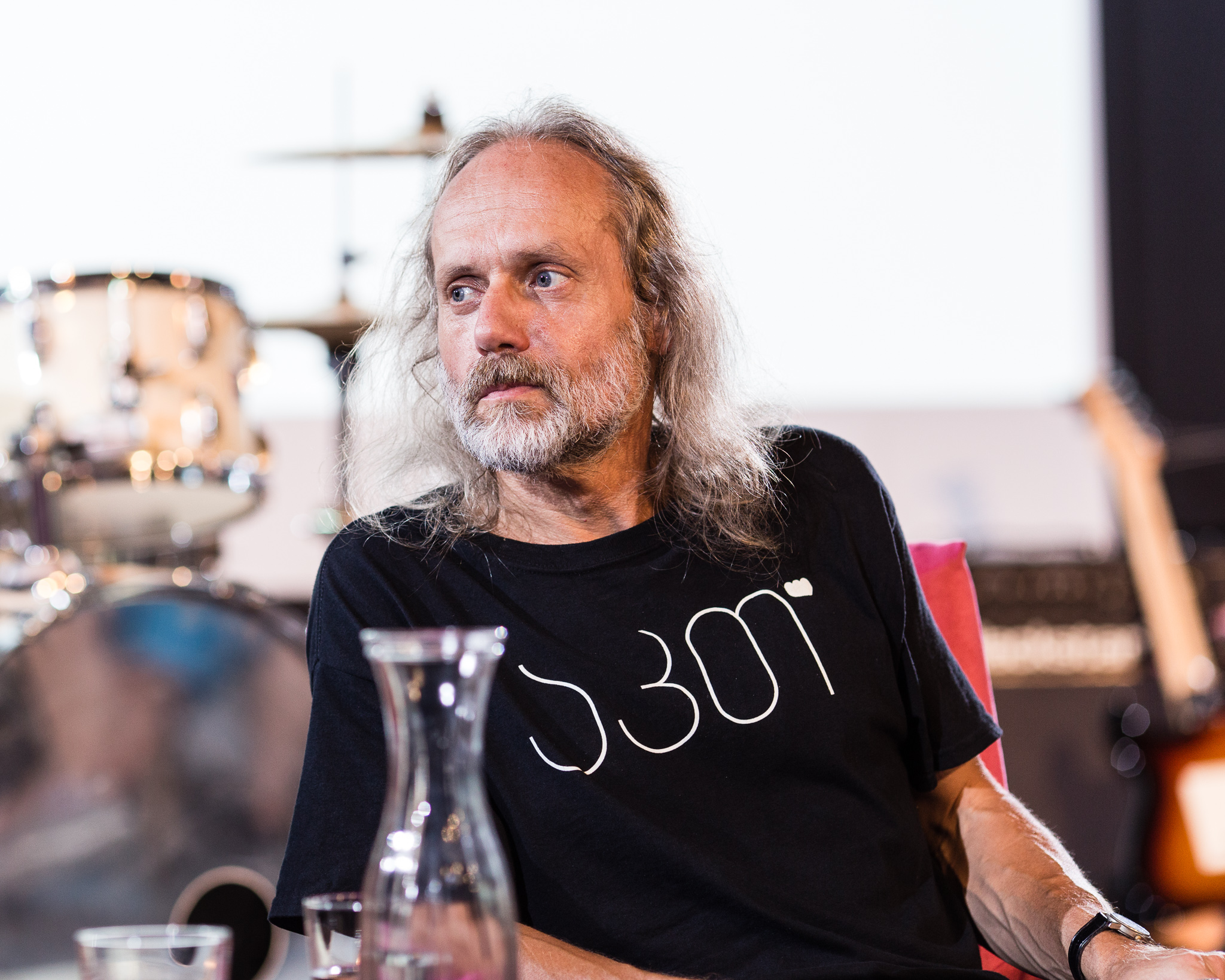
Petr Hruška in 2017

Petr Hruška (born 7 June 1964) is a Czech poet, screenwriter, literary critic and academic.

== Life ==
Hruška was born in Ostrava, a city known for coal-mining and steel production, and many of his poems reflect the industrial, working-class nature of the city, whose traditional industries have gone pear-shaped. He got his engineering degree (Ing.) at VŠB-Technical University of Ostrava (he specialised in water purification, 1987), MA at the Faculty of Arts of University of Ostrava (1990–94, thesis "Contemporary Czech subculture prose and poetry") and Ph.D. at the Faculty of Arts of Masaryk University in Brno ("Postwar surrealism and the reaction to the momentum of the avant-garde model in the official poetry", 2003). He works at the Department of Czech Literature at Czech Academy of Sciences in Brno where he focuses on Czech post-1945 poetry. He co-authored the four-volume History of Czech literature 1945 – 1989 (Dějiny české literatury 1945 – 1989), the second volume of the Dictionary of Czech writers since 1945 (Slovníku českých spisovatelů od roku 1945), and Dictionary of Czech Literary Magazines, Periodical Anthologies and Almanacs 1945 – 2000 (Slovník českých literárních časopisů, periodických literárních sborníků a almanachů 1945–2000).

He also worked as a university lecturer of Czech literature at Masaryk University and the University of Ostrava. He was a member of the body of editors of the magazine Host and is an editor of the magazine Obrácená strana měsíce. Between 1995 and 1998 he participated in publishing the magazine Landek (with Jan Balabán and others). He co-organises literary evenings, festivals and exhibitions in Ostrava (e. g. – with Ivan Motýl – Literární harendy, 1992 – 1994 which were partly improvised literature, text-appeal and happening evenings); he also acts in the cabaret of Jiří Surůvka and played Jesus in the O tom slavném zmrtvýchvstání passion play by Tomáš Vůjtek.

His twin brother Pavel is a literary critic. Petr Hruška lives with his partner Yvetta Ellerová (a singer and composer in the groups Norská trojka, and Complotto) and their three children in Ostrava. His son František is also a poet who published his debut book, Převážná doba, in 2021.

== Works ==
Petr Hruška says: "Poetry is not a decoration of life". According to him, poetry must "excite, disturb, amaze, surprise, unsettle the reader, demolish the existing aesthetic satisfactions and create new ones." Described as a poet of unrest and hidden dangers in everyday life, he confronts readers with a world seemingly familiar, and yet surprising in its reality. Casual situations are the source of a subtle tension and deep, though at first glance hardly noticeable meaning. He said in an interview: "I think that real grace and gracefulness appear only where all the gloominess, depression, and weariness of life, all the 'loneliness of the relationship' are somehow present as well. Only in the midst of that can a thin thread of light shine, a thin thread, which however contains all the fateful nearness that two people are capable of."

About Hruška's work, poet Ivan Wernisch wrote: "You manage to write poetry without unavailing things, that is, without lyrical babbling." He is one of the most praised Czech poets of the post-1989 era. Blue Diode Press wrote about his poems that they "uncover realities we may have sensed but have never before found as precisely and unsettlingly articulated."

He publishes poetry in many magazines (Host, Tvar, Revolver Revue, Literární noviny, Souvislosti, Weles etc.), writes reviews for Tvar and the Czech Radio Vltava, and writes academic articles (for Host, Tvar, Slovenská literatúra, Protimluv, Obrácená strana měsíce etc.) His poems have been translated into English, French, German, Slovenian, Italian, Dutch, Polish, Croatian etc. In 1998 he was awarded the Dresdner Lyrikpreis and in 2009 the Jan Skácel Award. His poetry collection Darmata won the Czech State Award for Literature in 2013. In Italy he won the Premio Piero Ciampi 2014. He was the editor of the Collected Works of Jan Balabán and Selected Poems by Ivan Martin Jirous; he also compiled an anthology of 20th-century Czech poetry for a Slovenian edition. He is the holder of the Jantar Prize (2019) for the book Nikde není řečeno and the Magnesia Litera Award for Poetry (2023) for the book Spatřil jsem svou tvář which was translated into English, Arabic, German, Polish and Croatian.

=== Poetry books ===
- Obývací nepokoje (Unrest Rooms) Sfinga, Ostrava 1995, il. by Adam Plaček
- Měsíce (Months) Host, Brno 1998, il. by Zdeněk Janošec-Benda
- Vždycky se ty dveře zavíraly (The Door Had Always Been Closing) Host, Brno 2002, il. by Daniel Balabán
- Zelený svetr (The Green Sweater) Host, Brno 2004, an omnibus of the three previous books, plus a collection of prose Odstavce (Paragraphs), il. by Hana Puchová, afterword Jiří Trávníček
- Auta vjíždějí do lodí (Cars Drive Into Ships) Host, Brno 2007, il. by Jakub Špaňhel
- Darmata (Host, Brno 2012) – il. by Katarína Szanyi
- Jedna věta (prose; Revolver Revue, 2015)
- Nevlastní (Argo, 2017) – il. by Zdeněk Janošec Benda
- Nikde není řečeno (Host, 2019) – il. by Jakub Špaňhel
- Spatřil jsem svou tvář (Host, Brno 2022) – il. by Jakub Špaňhel
- Minout se přesně (Host, Brno 2024) – il. by Jan Merta

=== Prose ===
- Jedna věta (Revolver Revue, 2015)
- V závalu (sloupky, podpovídky, odstavce a jiné krátké texty) (Revolver Revue, 2020)
- Pro smrt uděláno – živé rozhovory o posledních věcech (Kalich, 2021)

=== Poetry books abroad ===
- Meseci in druge pesmi (Društvo Apokalipsa, Ljubljana 2004), tr. by Anka Polajnar and Stanislava Chrobáková-Repar, Slovenia
- Jarek anrufen (Edition Toni Pongratz, Hauzenberg 2008), tr. by Reiner Kunze, Germany
- Mieszkalne niepokoje (Instytut Mikolowski, Mikolow 2011), tr. by Franciszek Nastulczyk
- Le macchie entrano nelle navi (Valigie Rosse, Livorno 2014), tr. by Jiří Špička and Paolo Maccari
- Mondom neked (Jelenkor, Budapest 2016), tr. by István Vörös
- Il soggiorno breve delle parole (qudulibri – edizione maggio, Bologna 2017), tr. by Jana Sovová and Elisa Bin
- Darmaty (Instytut Mikołowski, Mikołów 2017), tr. Franciszek Nastulczyk
- Dan velik kao oboreni jelen (Artikulacije, Koprivnica 2018), tr. Matija Ivačić
- Nužni smještaj (Adin Ljuca Samizdat, Praha 2018), tr. by Adin Ljuca
- Irgendwohin nach Haus (Edizion Azur, Leipzig 2019), tr. by Marina Lisa and Kerstin Becker
- Szmaty i drut (Instytut Mikołowski, Mikołów 2020), tr. by Franciszek Nastulczyk
- Volevamo salvarci (Miraggi edizioni, Turin, Itálie 2021) tr. by Elisa Bin
- Chcieliśmy się uratovać (Instytut Kultury Miejskiej, Gdańsk, 2022), tr. by Dorota Dobrew and Franciszek Nastulczyk
- Je cherche le peintre aux doigts blancs (Éditions de l’Université de Bruxelles, Bruxelles, 2022), tr. by Petr Král, Petra James, Jean-Gaspard Páleníček, Eve Filée, Jitka Hejlová, Astrid Muls, Grégoire Vandeghinste
- Lagani prelasci u kosmos (Treći Trg, Beograd, 2022), tr. by Tihana Hamović
- Everything Indicates (Blue Diode Press, Edinburgh 2023), tr. by Jonathan Bolton
- I Caught Sight of My Face (Kulturalis, London 2024), tr. by Joshua Mensch
- Ujrzałem swoją twarz (Instytut Mikołowski, Mikołów 2024), tr. by Franciszek Nastulczyk
- Ugledao sam svoje lice (Neolit, Koprivnica 2024), tr. by Matija Ivacić
- Und ich sah mein Gesicht (Voland & Quist, Berlin 2026), tr. by Martina Lisa
- Spatřil jsem svou tvář (Scheherezad Cultural Initiative, Cairo 2025), tr. by Khalid El Biltagi

=== Work in anthologies (selection) ===
Czech:

- Almanach Welesu (Weles, Brno 1997, ed. Vojtěch Kučera)
- V srdci Černého pavouka – ostravská literární a umělecká scéna 90. let (Votobia, Olomouc 2000), ed. Milan Kozelka
- Cestou – básnický almanach Welesu (Weles, Brno 2003), ed. Miroslav Chocholatý, Vojtěch Kučera, Pavel Sobek
- Co si myslí andělíček – dítě v české poezii (Brno 2004), ed. Ivan Petlan and Tomáš Lotocki
- Antologie nové české literatury 1995-2004 (Fra, Praha 2004), ed. Radim Kopáč and Karolina Jirkalová, afterword by Jan Suk
- S tebou sám – antologie současné české milostné poezie (Dauphin, Praha 2005), ed. Ondřej Horák
- 7edm: Petr Hruška, Jan Balabán, Petr Motýl, Pavel Šmíd, Sabina Karasová, Radek Fridrich, Patrik Linhart (Theo, Pardubice 2005)
- Báseň mého srdce (Literula, Praha 2006), ed. Vladimír Křivánek
- Antologie české poezie II. díl (1986–2006), 2007
- Nejlepší české básně 2009 (Host, Brno 2009), eds. Karel Šiktanc and Karel Piorecký
- Nejlepší české básně 2010 (Host, Brno 2010), eds. Miloslav Topinka and Jakub Řehák
- Nejlepší české básně 2011 (Host, Brno 2011), eds. Petr Král and Jan Štolba
- Nejlepší české básně 2012 (Host, Brno 2012), ed. Simona Martínková-Racková
- Nejlepší české básně 2013 (Host, Brno 2013), eds. Ivan Wernisch and Wanda Heinrichová
- Co zůstává – malá antologie soudobé české poezie (Centrum pro studium demokracie a kultury, Brno 2013), ed. František Mikš
- Nejlepší české básně 2016 (Host, Brno 2016), eds. Vít Slíva and Jakub Chrobák
- Nejlepší české básně 2017 (Host, Brno 2017), eds. Sylva Fischerová and Jan Šulc
- Nejlepší české básně 2018 (Host, Brno 2018), eds. J. H. Krchovský and Ondřej Hanus

Foreign:

- La poésie tchèque en fin de siècle (Sources, Namur, Belgium 1999, ed. Petr Král), tr. by Petr Král
- Antologie de la poésie tchèque contemporaine 1945-2000 (Gallimard, Paris, France 2002, ed. Petr Král), tr. Petr Král
- Reiner Kunze: Wo wir zu Hause das Salz haben – Nachdichtungen (S. Fischer Verlag, Frankfurt am Mein 2003), tr. by Reiner Kunze
- Literair Paspoort 2004 (Den Haag, Netherlands 2004), tr. by Jana Beranová
- In our own words (MW Enterprises, Cary, USA 2005, ed. Marlow Weaver), tr. by Zuzana Gabrišová
- Из века в век (Iz vieka v viek) – češskaja poezija (Pranat, Moscow, Russia 2005, ed. Dalibor Dobiáš), tr. by Olga Lukavaja
- Tra ansia e finitudine – Szorongás és végesség között (Budapest, Maďarsko 2005) tr. by István Vörös and Claudio Poeta
- Circumference – poetry in translation (New York, USA 2006, ed. Stefania Heim, Jennifer Kronovet), tr. by Jonathan Bolton
- New European Poets (Graywolf Press, Saint Paul, Minnesota, USA 2008, ed. Wayne Miller and Kevin Prufer), tr. by Zuzana Gabrišová
- [avant-poste] numero special (Praha-Paříž 2017), tr. Petr Král
- Prchavé domovy-Fleeting Homes (eds. Robert Hýsek and Matthew Sweney, Universita Palackého, Olomouc 2010), tr. Matthew Sweney
- Întunericul din Camera Copilion – Antologie de poezie cehă contemporană (ed. Mircea Dan Duţă, Descrierea CIP and Bibliotecii Nationale a României, Bucuresti 2015), tr. by Mircea Dan Duţă
- Przewodnik po zaminowanym terenie (ed. Krzysztof Śliwka, Marek Śnieciński, Ośrodek Postaw Twórczych, Wrocław 2016), tr. by Franciszek Nastulczyk
- Die letzte Metro – junge Literatur aus Tschechien (Verlag Voland & Quist, Dresden, Leipzig 2017), tr. by Martina Lisa
- Pesem sem – razumljive pesmi za nerazumljive čase (eds. Igor Saksida, Aleš Šteger, Beletrina, Ljubljana 2018), tr. by Anka Polajnar, Stanislava Chrobáková-Repar

=== Academic monographs ===
- Někde tady. Český básník Karel Šiktanc (Host, Brno 2010)
- Daleko do ničeho. Básník Ivan Wernisch (Host, Brno 2019)

=== Academic articles (selection) ===
- Do hospody v literatuře (Tvar 1996, no. 11)
- Setrvačnost avantgardního modelu – nový surrealismus. (Host 1998, no. 9)
- Básně psané na střed (Host 1999, no. 1)
- Pořád na svém místě. Karlu Šiktancovi začaly vycházet sebrané spisy (Host 2000, no. 8)
- Povinnost jistot a potřeba pochyb (Host 2000, no. 10)
- Druhá vlna první velikosti (Host 2002, no. 10)
- První knížky veršů v mladofrontovní edici Ladění (Slovenská literatura 2002, no. 5)
- Ouřezek, potutel, sakr, ošoust... Karel Šiktanc a umění klnout, Host 2009, no. 9, p. 15–19
- Dekáda nespokojenosti. Úsilí poezie v prvním desetiletí nového milénia, Host 2014, no. 9, p. 23–28
- Nic vážného se neděje! Ivan Wernisch a zapomenuté kouzlo ruského lubku, Host 2016, no. 8, p. 61–69
- Působení (a řádění) Ivana Wernische v Literárních novinách devadesátých let, Souvislosti 2017, no. 3, p. 16–33
- Projev nad hrobem Petra Bezruče 15. září 2017 in Petr Bezruč. Bard prvý, co promluvil. Sborník z konference, konané 21.-22. září 2017 u příležitosti stého padesátého výročí narození Vladimíra Vaška. Ostravská univerzita, Filozofická fakulta, Ostrava 2018, p. 9-10.
- Chlap ve stoje (Karel Šiktanc devadesátiletý), Host 2018, no. 7, p. 31–35

=== Theatre and television ===
- Screenplay (together with Radovan Lipus) of a play Průběžná O(s)trava krve, first staged 1994, on TV 1997
- Screenplay to the documentary film Genius loci - Historie časopisu Host, Host do domu (dir. by Vladimír Kelbl, TV Brno, 2002, broadcast 2003)

=== CD ===
- Zelený Petr (Norská trojka, CD, 2002), lyrics
- Obývací nepokoje (Selected poems on CD), in magazine Aluze 2/3, 2004)
- Průběžná O(s)trava krve, stage play adapted for radio (2000)
- Magor. koncert k nedožitým 80. narozeninám I. M. Jirouse (Guerilla Records, 2025)
