= Jakuba Katalpa =

Czech writer

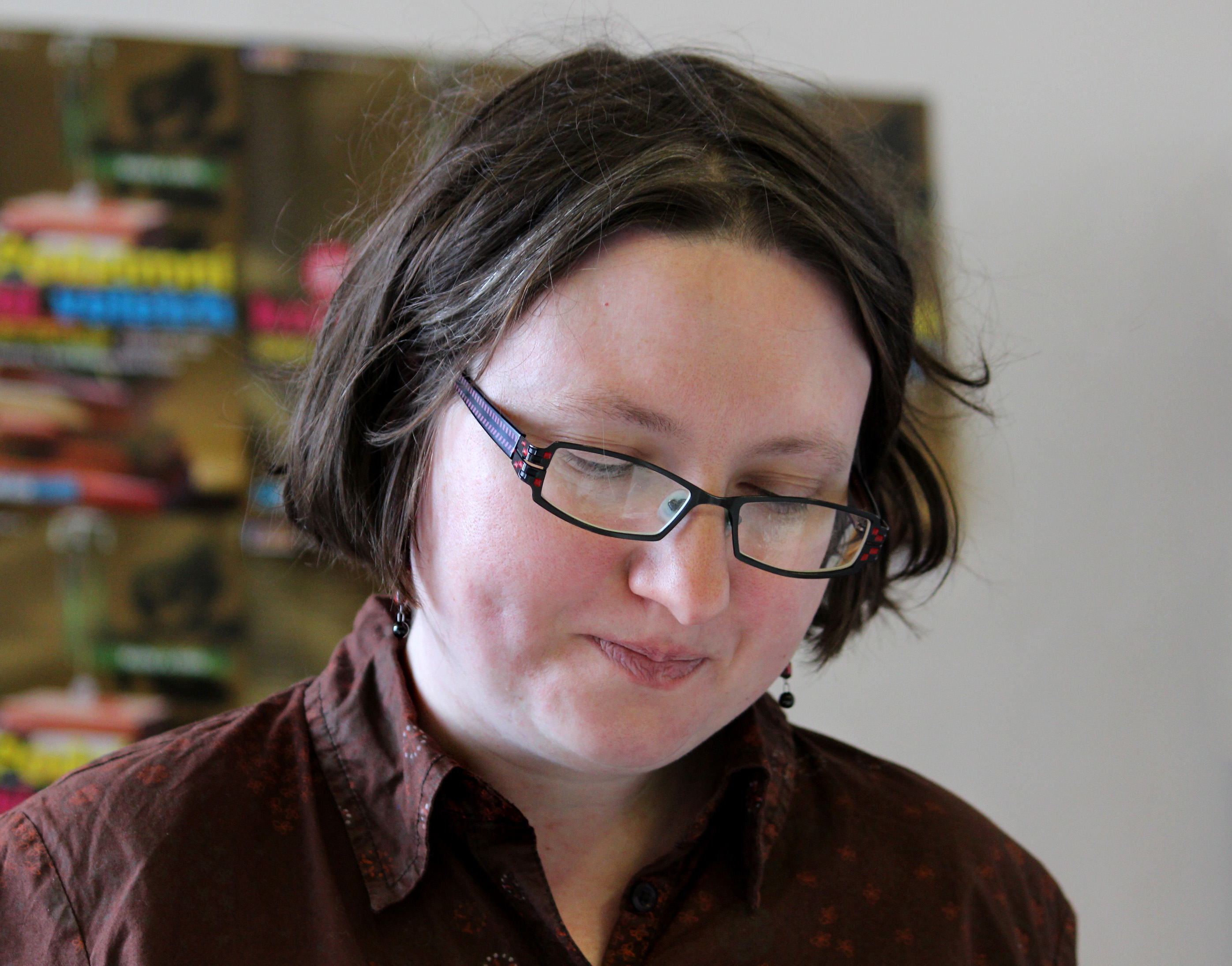
- Jakuba Katalpa in 2013.
- Born: Tereza Jandová; 1979 (age 46–47); Plzeň, Czechoslovakia
- Education: Charles University
- Writing career
- Notable work: Němci

Tereza Jandová (born 1979), known by her pen name Jakuba Katalpa, is a Czech writer, primarily of novels. She is best known for her Czech Book Award-winning novel Němci (2012), which examines the history of the Sudetenland through a woman's relationship with her grandmother.

== Biography ==
Jakuba Katalpa was born Tereza Jandová in 1979 in Plzeň, in what was then Czechoslovakia. She studied psychology, media studies, and Czech studies at Charles University in Prague, graduating in 2005.

Jandová's first published work was the 2000 short story collection Krásné bolesti ("Lovely Pain"), followed by the collection Povídka beze jména ("Story Without a Name") in 2003. She subsequently began writing novels under the pen name Jakuba Katalpa.

The first of these, the novella Je hlína k snědku? ("Can Mud Be Eaten?"), was published in 2006. It was shortlisted for the Magnesia Litera Discovery of the Year Award. She then wrote her first full-length novel, Hořké moře ("Bitter Sea"), in 2008. Perhaps her most personal work, it was shortlisted for the Jiří Orten Award for young writers.

In 2012, Katalpa published Němci ("Germans"), which would become her most popular work. Němci won the Czech Book Award and the Josef Škvorecký Award, and it was nominated for the Magnesia Litera Award for Prose. It tells the story of a Czech woman living in London who travels to search for her estranged German grandmother. While much of her earlier work was experimental, Němci is characterized by its realism. The title, Němci, is the Czech word for "Germans," but the term derives from the word "mute," a reference to the tense silence around the Czech Republic's history with Germany.

After writing the novel Doupě ("The Den") in 2017, in 2020 Katalpa published the novel Zuzanin dech ("Zuzana's Breath"), which also deals with the tensions of life in the Sudetenland. It tells the story of the daughter of a Jewish sugar factory owner during the Holocaust. In 2025, she published Úlice: Liebesroman, which is also set during World War II in the German-Czech borderlands.

== Selected works ==
=== Short stories ===
- Krásné bolesti (2000)
- Povídka beze jména (2003)

=== Novella ===
- Je hlína k snědku? (2003)

=== Novels ===
- Hořké moře (2008)
- Němci (2012)
- Doupě (2017)
- Zuzanin dech (2020)
- Úlice: Liebesroman (2025)
