= Josef Škvorecký Award =

The Josef Škvorecký Award (Czech language: Cena Josefa Škvoreckého) is an award for the best original prose work of the preceding year. The award is named after the Czech-Canadian writer and publisher Josef Škvorecký. The prize was first awarded in 2007.

== Laureates ==
Year	Author	Awarded Work	Reference
2016	Zuzana Brabcová	Voliéry. Brno : Druhé mesto, 2016. ISBN 9788072273812.	
2015	Vladimír Poštulka	Hřbitovní kvítí na smetaně. Máj : Dokořán, 2014. ISBN 9788073636210.	
2014	Martin Reiner	Básník : román o Ivanu Blatném. Torst, 2014. ISBN 9788072154722.	
2013	Jakuba Katalpa	Němci. Host, 2012. ISBN 9788072946822.	
2012	Kateřina Tučková	Žítkovské bohyně. Host, 2012. ISBN 9788072945283	
2011	Martin Ryšavý	Vrač. Revolver Revue, 2010. ISBN 9788087037294.	
2010	Emil Hakl	Pravidla směšného chování. Argo, 2010. ISBN 9788025702628.	
2009	Tomáš Zmeškal	Milostný dopis klínovým písmem. Torst, 2008. ISBN 9788072153497. English translation. Love letter in cuneiform. New Haven : Yale University Press, 2016. ISBN 9780300186970	
2008	Petra Hůlová	Stanice Tajga. Praha: Torst, 2008. ISBN 9788072153367.	
2007	Jan Novák	Děda. Praha: Bookman, 2007. ISBN 9788090345560.	

== See also ==
- List of Czech literary awards
