= Slib =

Slib or SLIB may refer to:

- Slib, a 2009 Czech novel, written by Jiří Kratochvil, also known by the English title The Promise
- SLIB, a computer software, a library for the programming language Scheme, written by Aubrey Jaffer
- Super League International Board, the defunct rugby league football governing body now replaced by the International Rugby League
