= Jan Němec (writer) =

Czech writer (born 1981)

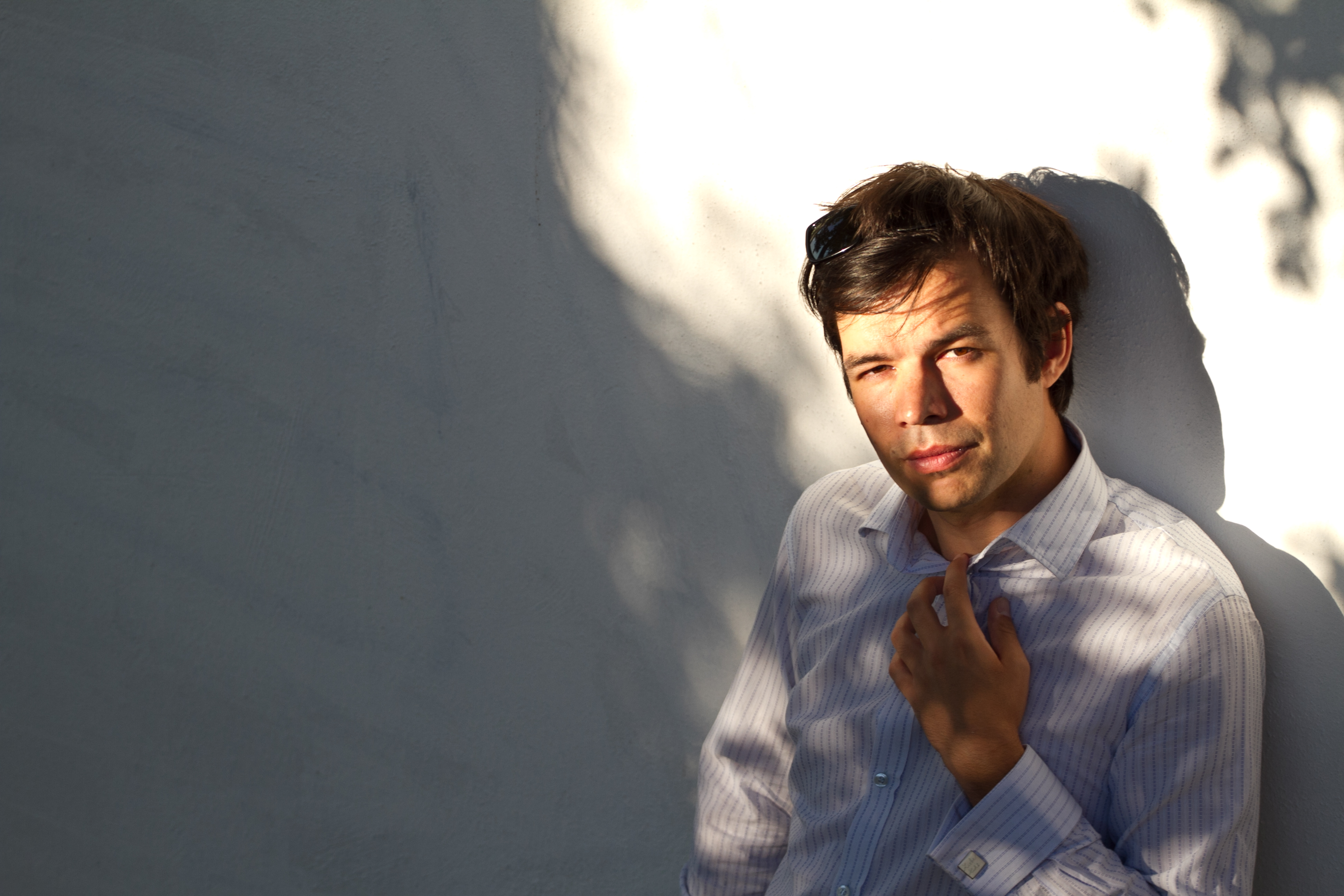
Jan Němec

Jan Němec (born 1981) is a Czech writer. He was born and raised in Brno. He studied at Masaryk University and the Janáček Academy of Music and Performing Arts, both in Brno.

He has published four books till date:

- První život (First Life, poetry, 2007)
- Hra pro čtyři ruce (Playing Four Hands, short stories, 2009)
- Dějiny světla (A History of Light, novel, 2013)
- Možnosti milostného románu (Possibilities of Love Novel, novel, 2019)

A History of Light is a biographical novel about the photographer František Drtikol and won The Czech Book, and the European Union Prize for Literature.
