= Dešťová hůl =

- Genre: Drama
- Written by: Jiří Hájíček
- Directed by: Bohdan Sláma
- Starring: Kryštof Hádek; Jenovéfa Boková; Petra Špalková
- Country of origin: Czech Republic
- Original language: Czech
- No. of seasons: 1
- No. of episodes: 3

Production
- Producers: Monika Effenbergerová; Jaroslav Sedláček
- Cinematography: Marek Diviš
- Running time: 60 minutes

Original release
- Network: ČT1

Dešťová hůl (English: The Rainstick) is an upcoming Czech drama miniseries directed by Bohdan Sláma. It is based on a novel of the same name which was written by Jiří Hájíček. The series is scheduled for 2027.

== Plot ==
The story follows Zbyněk, a land management expert whose former love asks him for help. Zbyněk thus returns to the countryside where he grew up and gradually becomes embroiled in a land dispute.

== Cast ==
- Kryštof Hádek as Zbyněk
- Jenovéfa Boková as Tereza
- Petra Špalková as Bohuna
- Martin Dejdar as Josef (Pepík) Rajtar, Mayor of Lešice
- Jaroslav Dušek as Honza Štefka, Zbyněk's coworker and boss
- Filip Březina as Ladislav Reha, businessman
- Ladislav Frej
- Pavla Beretová
- František Beleš
- Tomáš Jeřábek
- Petr Lněnička
- Michal Isteník
- Jan Vlasák
- Jan Hájek
- Lukáš Melník
- Zuzana Bydžovská
- Taťjana Medvecká
- Denisa Barešová

== Production ==
The miniseries began filming in February 2026 in České Budějovice and villages in South Bohemia. The screenplay was written by Jiří Hájíček, the author of the original novel. The South Bohemian Philharmonic Orchestra performs for a concert hall scene. While filming this scene the power went out which forced prolonging of the filming. Filming locations also included a farm near Hroznějovice and University of South Bohemia in České Budějovice.
