= Kafka Award =

Kafka Award may refer to:

- Janet Heidiger Kafka Prize
- Franz Kafka Prize
