= Karenin (surname) =

Karenin is a surname. Its feminine counterpart is Karenina (Russian: Каренина) or (Czech: Kareninová). Notable people with the surname include:

- Anna Karenina, fictitious heroine of Anna Karenina
- Anna Kareninová (born 1954), Czech translator
- Varvara Komarova-Stasova (1862–1942), Russian writer writing under the pen name Vladimir Karenin
