= Kateřina Tučková =

Czech novelist and curator (born 1980)

- Kateřina Tučková in 2024
- Born: 31 October 1980 (age 45); Brno, Czechoslovakia
- Education: Gymnázium Kapitána Jaroše
- Alma mater: Masaryk University, Charles University
- Writing career
- Notable work: Žítkovské bohyně
- Notable awards: Czech State Award for Literature

Kateřina Tučková (born 31 October 1980) is a Czech novelist and curator. She is best known as the author of Žítkovské bohyně, a Czech bestseller translated into 21 languages.

== Life ==
Tučková was born in Brno and spent her childhood in the South Moravian village of Moutnice. She moved with her mother to Kuřim when she was a teenager. Tučková studied at Gymnázium Kapitána Jaroše (Captain Jaroš’s Gymnasium) and got an academic degree in the field of history of art, Czech language, and Czech literature at The Faculty of Arts of Masaryk University in Brno. In 2004, she founded The ARSkontakt project, an annual exposition of artworks of her generation. As a curator, Tučková worked in Brno in a non-commercial gallery focused on young art. In 2014 she graduated from The Institute of Art History at Charles University in Prague. Since 2010 she has worked as a curator in Exhibition hall Chrudim.

In 2015, Kateřina Tučková participated in the organization of the Year of Reconciliation, during which the city of Brno, on the occasion of the 70th anniversary of the end of World War II, for the first time officially apologized for the inhumane expulsion of German speaking population from Brno. During this expulsion in 1945 many women, children and old people died. This initiative, which was inspired besides other things, by her novel The Expulsion of Gerta Schnirch (Host, Brno 2009), also praised the German President Joachim Gauck in his speech on the Day of deportees. From 2015 to 2018, she was the program director of the multi-genre festival Meeting Brno, which focuses on the confrontation of current and historical Central European topics and their artistic conception.

In 2017, Katerina Tučková was awarded the Prize for Freedom, Democracy and Human Rights for an extraordinary contribution to the reflection of modern history by the Institute for the Study of Totalitarian Regimes.

In 2018, she was awarded the prize Premio Salerno Libro d'Europa in Italy for her literature work.

In 2022, Tučková received the Czech State Award for Literature for the novel Bílá Voda and for her body of work.

On 28 October 2026, she was awarded by the Czech Republic's Medal of Merit for services to the state in the field of arts.

== Work ==
=== Curatorial career ===
Tučková curates exhibitions in the Czech Republic and abroad.

- Transfer – exhibition held in the White BOX Gallery, Munich (2007) and Bohemian National Hall New York City (2008)
- Our House Is Your House – exhibition held in Geh8 Gallery, Dresden (2010).

== Publications ==
- Nová trpělivost: Hranice ustupují (2007), work focused on contemporary Czech art
- Slovem i obrazem (2008), work focused on contemporary Czech art
- Normální malba (2009), works focused on contemporary Czech art
- Věra Sládková, prozaické dílo – Publication focused on prosaic work of Věra Sládková.
- Montespiáda (in English, Montespan Contest) published in 2006. is about the relationship of a young female student with an older man. The book did not reach wider attention. It is named after Madame de Montespan, who was maîtresse-en-titre of France Louis XIV.
- Vyhnání Gerty Schnirch (Host, 2009),(in English The Expulsion of Gerta Schnirch) is about the expulsion of Sudeten Germans and Brno death march. It contains an emotional description of post-war anti-German terror. The main character, Gerta Shnirch, mother of an infant, is forced to march from Brno to Pohořelice. The novel was awarded by Magnesia Litera and nominated to Cena Jiřího Ortena.
- Žítkovské bohyně (Host, 2012),(in English The Goddesses of Žítková) was published in March 2012 and became the 6th best sold fiction title in the Czech Republic for 2012 (for 21 weeks was book listed among the first 10 best sold titles). The paperback edition was published in February, 2013. It focuses on female natural healers from Bílé Karpaty mountain range who are traditionally called „bohyně“ (goddesses). Tučková narrates their complicated history because persecutions by the inquisition in the 17th century, and the later Priests’ Initiative in the 19th century were finally suppressed by communist government. The book is not a historical study; it manifests Tučková’s sympathy with goddesses’ activities. The bestseller was reviewed by mass media and awarded the Josef Škvorecký Award, The Czech Book Reader’s Award and Magnesia Litera - Reader's Prize. More than 110.000 copies were sold and it is translated into 13 languages. The theatre adaptation premiered in March 2014 (Městské divadlo Zlín) with huge success. Film rights are sold as well.
- Fabrika (Host, 2014), the story of the textile barons from Moravian Manchester. The story accompanied the exhibition project Brno-Moravian Mancherster in Moravian Gallery in Brno.
- Bílá voda (2022), about women during the Communist era in Czechoslovakia.

== Sources ==
- Kateřina Tučková official website: Hlavní stránka
- Galery Arskontakt website: ARSkontakt
- Johann Georg Gutwein, autor trompe l'oeil, Skupina RADAR
- Magnesia Litera - Oceňujeme a propagujeme kvalitní literaturu
- Nominované tituly
- Prize for Freedom, Democracy and Human Rights for an extraordinary contribution to the reflection of modern history
