= List of Czech literary awards =

A list of Czech literary awards.

- Magnesia Litera : Annual book award held in the Czech Republic.
- Jiří Orten Award (Cena Jiřího Ortena) : a Czech literary prize given to the author of a work of prose or poetry who is no older than 30 at the time of the work's completion. Named after Jiří Orten
- Josef Škvorecký Award (Cena Josefa Škvoreckého) : Prize for the best Czech prose of the past year. Named after Josef Škvorecký
- The Czech Book (Česká kniha) : literary prize with the objective of promoting contemporary Czech literature.
- Franz Kafka Prize (Cena Franze Kafky) : an international literary award named after Franz Kafka.
- Karel Čapek Prize (Czech PEN) (Cena Karla Čapka): for significant literary contributions in support of reinforcing or maintaining democratic and humanist values in society. Named after Karel Čapek.
- Karel Čapek Prize (Fandom Prize) (Cena Karla Čapka (cena fandomu)) : awarded to authors of works of science fiction, fantasy or horror written in Czech or Slovak. Named after Karel Čapek.
- Czech State Award for Literature (Státní cena za literaturu) : State national award for an original literary work in Czech published during the preceding year or in recognition of a lifetime’s work of excellence.
- Czech State Award for Translation (Státní cena za překladatelské dílo) : State national award for the translation of a literary work from a foreign language into Czech.
- Lidové Noviny Book of the Year (Kniha roku Lidových novin) : The book of the year according to Lidové Noviny newspapers.
- Jaroslav Seifert Prize (Cena Jaroslava Seiferta) : prestigious Czech literary prize awarded for an excellent work of poetry or fiction published in the past three years in the Czech Republic or abroad. Named after the Nobel Prize–winning Czechoslovak writer, poet and journalist, Jaroslav Seifert.
- Golden Ribbon Award (Zlatá Stuha) : An annual award to creators of the best books for children and young people in Czech. It is only prize in the Czech Republic dedicated exclusively to children's literature.
