= Franz Kafka Society =

Czech organisation

The Franz Kafka Society (Czech: Společnost Franze Kafky; German: Franz-Kafka-Gesellschaft) was a non-profit organisation established in 1990 to celebrate the heritage of German Language literature in Prague. The society was co-sponsor the annual Franz Kafka Prize. Membership stood at around 1000 people globally, including Nobel Prize winner Günter Grass.The former president and founding member of the society was Vladimír Železný.

Among the stated goals of the organisation was to foster cultural pluarity among the Czech, German and Jewish people of Central Europe. It also aimed to translate the entire work of Franz Kafka into Czech.

The Franz Kafka Society initiated the creation of the Statue of Franz Kafka, created by Jaroslav Róna. The statue was presented in the Czech capital of Prague in 2003 where it has remained ever since. The buildings of the society currently host a replica of the library of books owned by Kafka, totalling around 1,000 books and articles.

The society was dissolved on July 4, 2022.
