= Hřebeč =

- Municipality
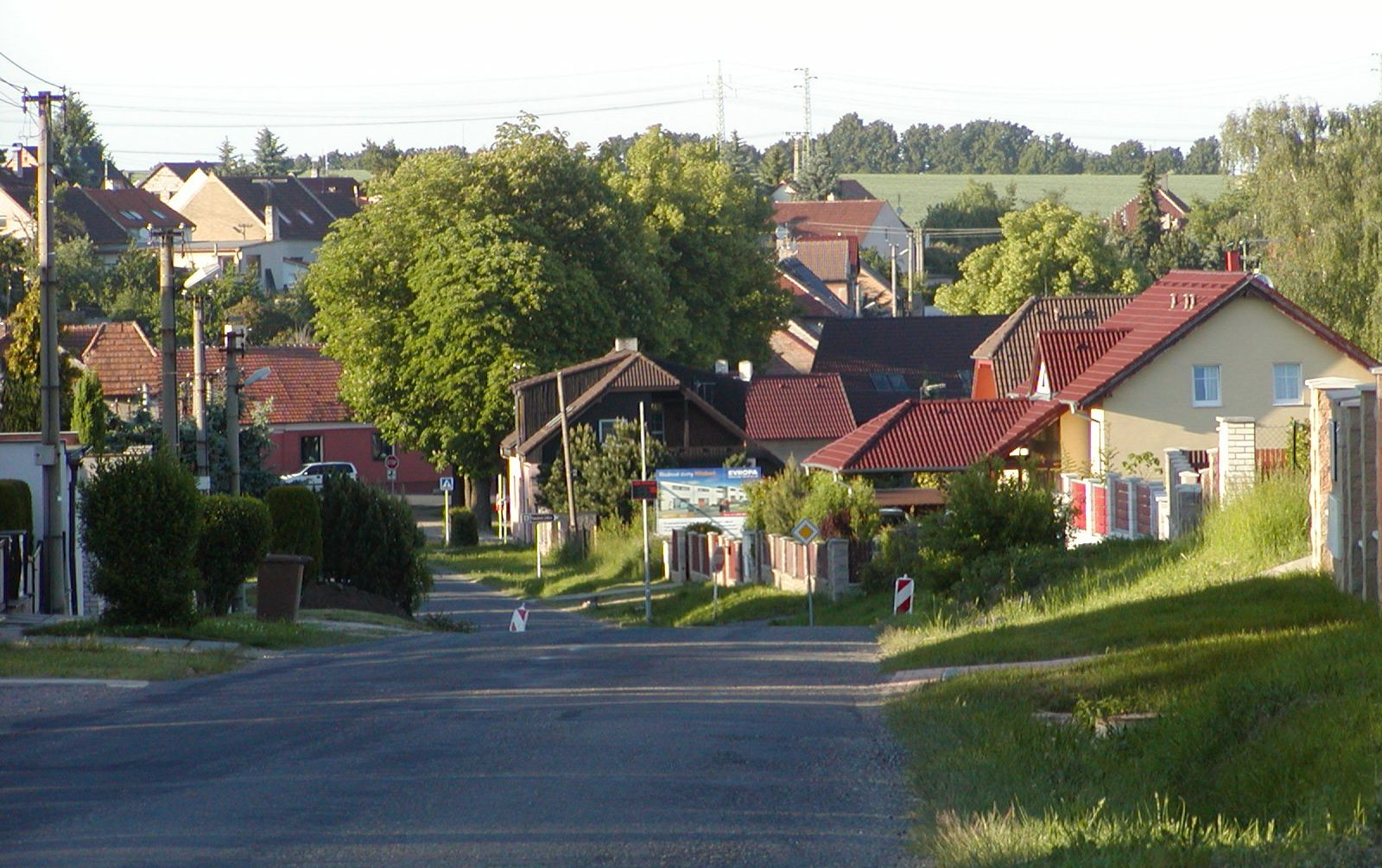
- View towards the centre of Hřebeč

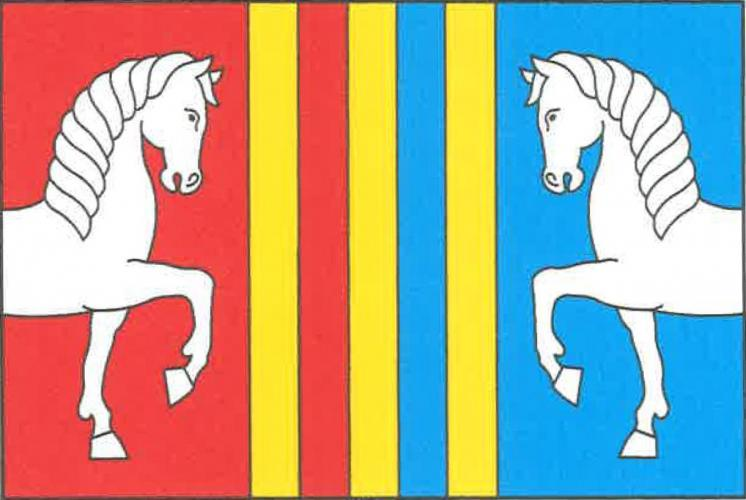
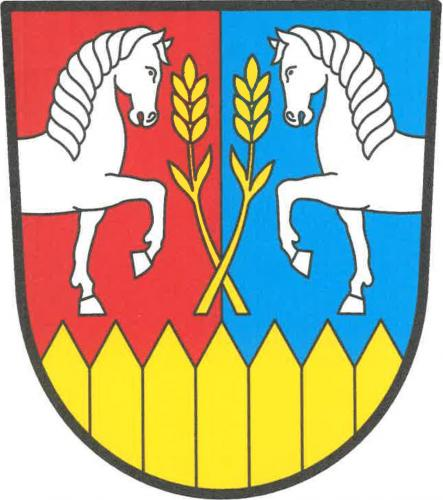
- Flag Coat of arms

- Location in the Czech Republic
- Coordinates: 50°8′10″N 14°9′52″E
- Country: Czech Republic
- Region: Central Bohemian
- District: Kladno
- First mentioned: 1285

Area
  - Total: 4.22 km^{2} (1.63 sq mi)
- Elevation: 351 m (1,152 ft)

Population (2026-01-01)
  - Total: 2,156
  - Density: 511/km^{2} (1,320/sq mi)
- Time zone: UTC+1 (CET)
  - Summer (DST): UTC+2 (CEST)
- Postal code: 273 45
- Website: www.hrebec.cz

Hřebeč is a municipality and village in Kladno District in the Central Bohemian Region of the Czech Republic. It has about 2,200 inhabitants.

== Administrative division ==
Hřebeč consists of two municipal parts (in brackets population according to the 2021 census):

- Hřebeč (2,061)
- Netřeby (41)

== Etymology ==
The name evolved from the surname of its founder, Vojslav Rebecki. The name was originally Řebeč, but it was sometimes misspelled as Hřebeč. In 1924, the name was officially changed to Hřebeč.

== Geography ==
Hřebeč is located about 3 kilometres (2 mi) east of Kladno and 14 km (9 mi) northwest of Prague. It lies in a flat agricultural landscape in the Prague Plateau. The highest point is at 388 m (1,273 ft) above sea level.

== History ==
Hřebeč was founded in 1285 by Vojslav Rebecki near a demolished fortress called Tasov. The village often changed owners. In 1420, Hřebeč was burned down by the Hussites and remained uninhabited for several years. Between 1429 and 1545, it was a property of several notable noble families, including the Slavatas and the Schwarzenbergs. From 1557 to 1652, Hřebeč was owned by the Žďárský of Žďár family, but then the owners again often changed. After 1777, Hřebeč was acquired by Duke Charles II August of Zweibrücken. Then it became property of Emperor Ferdinand I. After his death, it was inherited by Emperor Franz Joseph I.

== Demographics ==
Historical population

Year	Pop.	±%
1869	625	—
1880	810	+29.6%
1890	952	+17.5%
1900	1,074	+12.8%
1910	1,462	+36.1%

Year	Pop.	±%
1921	1,433	−2.0%
1930	1,614	+12.6%
1950	1,450	−10.2%
1961	1,432	−1.2%
1970	1,278	−10.8%

Year	Pop.	±%
1980	1,177	−7.9%
1991	1,127	−4.2%
2001	1,231	+9.2%
2011	1,719	+39.6%
2021	2,102	+22.3%

Source: Censuses

== Transport ==
There are no railways or major roads passing through the municipality.

== Sights ==
The only protected cultural monument in the municipality are terrain remains of the former Tasov fortress, now an archaeological site.

== Notable people ==
- Karel Šiktanc (1928–2021), poet and children's writer
