= Czech State Award for Translation =

Award by the Ministry of Culture of the Czech Republic

The Czech State Award for Translation (Czech: Státní cena za překladatelské dílo) is an award given by the Ministry of Culture of the Czech Republic. The Czech State Award for Translation is awarded for the translation of a literary work from a foreign language into Czech. The prize consists of a certificate and 300,000 Czech koruna. It is awarded each year on October 28, along with the Czech State Award for Literature.

== Laureates ==
Year	Author	Awarded Work	Reference
2023	Jarka Vrbová	For her body of work of translation from the Norwegian language.	
2022	Jiří Našinec	For translating Charles Nodier and Mircea Eliade and for popularization of Romanian literature.	
2021	Alena Morávková	For his body of work of Russian to Czech translation.	
2020	Blanka Stárková		
2019	Anna Kareninová		
2018	Helena Stachová	For her lifetime of work.	
2017	Eva Kondrysová	For her lifetime of work.	
2016	Pavel Dominik	For his translation of Vladimir Nabokov's Ada, or Ardor from English. (Czech: Ada, aneb Žár. ISBN 978-80-7432-657-8)	
2015	Hanuš Karlach	For his body of work of German to Czech translation to-date.	
2014	Jiří Pechar	For his lifetime of work.	
2013	Vratislav Slezák	For his lifetime work, taking into consideration his translations of Hermann Hesse.	-
2012	Vladimír Mikeš	For his lifetime of work.	-
2011	Martin Hilský	Translation work to-date and especially the translation into Czech of the complete works of William Shakespeare	
2010	Oldřich Král	For lifelong work in the field of translation theory.	-
2009	Miroslav Jindra	For his lifetime work, taking into account the translation of Leonard Cohen's The Book of Longing. (Czech: Kniha toužení. Prague: Argo 2008.)	-
2008	Jiří Stromšík	For his work in the field of literary translation.	-
2007	Antonín Přidal	For his work in the field of literary translation.	-
2006	František Fröhlich	For his work in the field of literary translation.	-
2005	Pavla Lidmilová	For his work in the field of literary translation.	-
2004	Dušan Zbavitel	For his work in the field of literary translation.	-
2003	Dušan Karpatský	For his work in the field of literary translation.	-
2002	Jiří Pelán	For his work to-date in the field of artistic translation and for his translation from Italian for Básníci soumraku. Italská poezie pozdní secese Paseka, 2001. ISBN 80-7185-387-9.	-
2001	Jan Vladislav	For lifelong work in the field of artistic translation, taking into account his translations of Michelangelo Buonarroti's Oheň, jímž hořím. (Praha: Mladá fronta 1999) and Michel Butor's Histoire extraordinaire. Essai sur un rêve de Baudelaire (Czech translation:Podivuhodný příběh. Esej o jednom Baudelairově snu. Brno: Host 1998).	-
2000	Anna Valentová	For her work to-date and for her translation from Hungarian of Péter Nádas's Emlékiratok könyve (Czech: Kniha pamětí. Praha: Mladá fronta 1999.)	-
1999	Lumír Čivrný	For a lifetime significant translation work	-
1998	Jindřich Pokorný	For extensive and significant translation work	-
1997	Luba Pellarová and Rudolf Pellar	For a lifetime extensive and significant translation work	-
1996	Ludvík Kundera	For his extensive lifetime work and for his translations of Georg Trakl's Šebestián ve snu. (Třebíč: Arca JiMfa, 1995) and Gottfried Benn's Básně. (Praha: ERM 1995.)	
1995	Josef Hiršal	For his lifelong translation activities and for his translation of Johann Christian Günther's Krvavý rubín. (Praha: Mladá fronta, 1995.)	-

== See also ==
- List of Czech literary awards
