= Radka Denemarková =

Czech writer (born 1968)

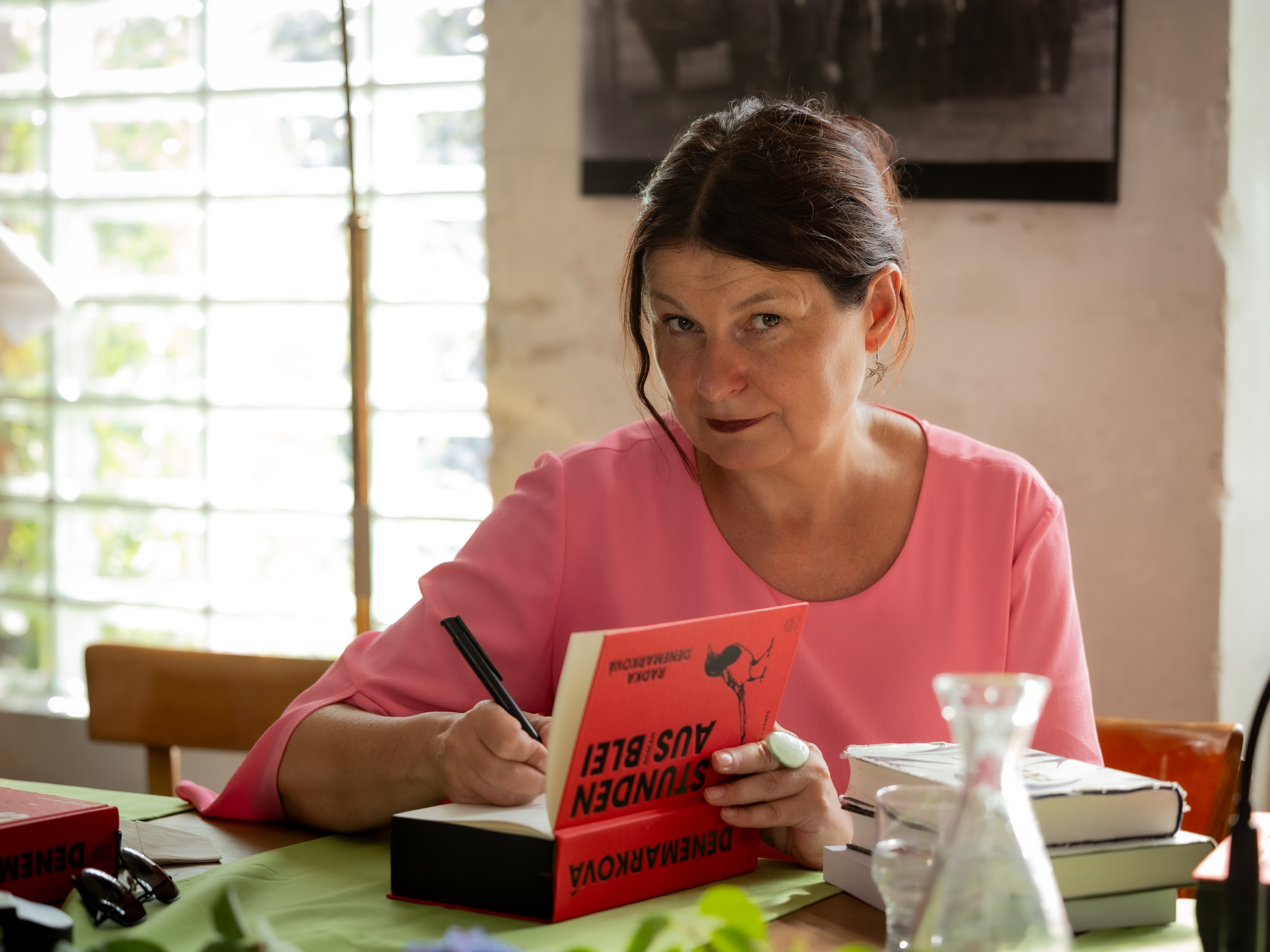
- Radka Denemarková, 2013
- Born: 14 March 1968 (age 58); Kutná Hora, Czechoslovakia
- Writing career
- Language: Czech
- Website: radka-denemarkova.cz/en/

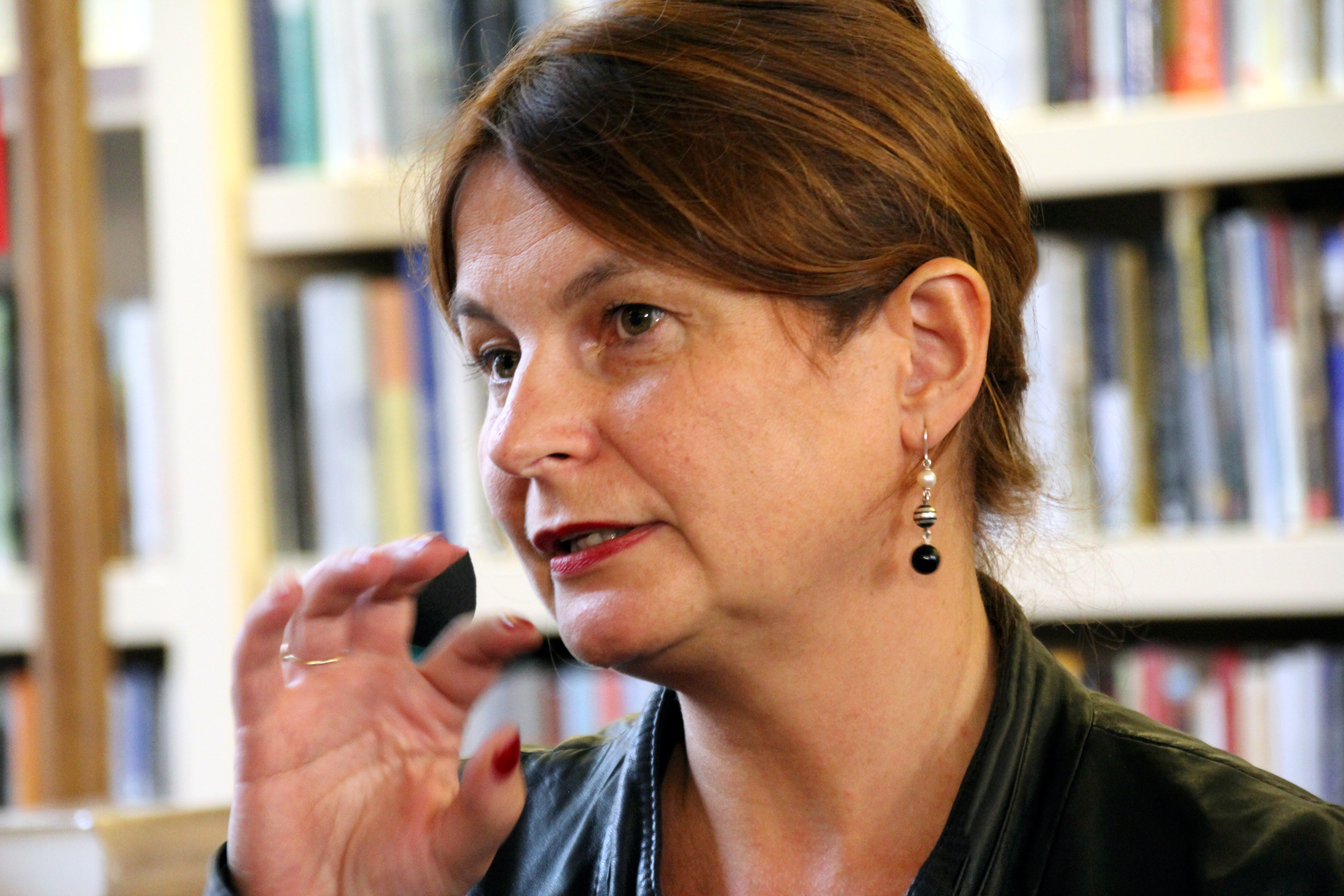
Radka Denemarková, 2013

Radka Denemarková (born 14 March 1968) is a Czech novelist, dramatist, TV screenplay writer, translator, and essayist from Kutná Hora.

Denemarková is the only Czech writer who has received the Magnesia Litera Award four times (in different categories—for prose, nonfiction, translation, and Book of the Year). Her works have been translated into 23 languages.

== Life ==
Denemarková studied German and Czech at the Faculty of Arts of Charles University, gaining her doctorate in 1997. She worked as a researcher at the Institute for Czech Literature of the Academy of Sciences of the Czech Republic and was dramatic advisor at the Na zábradlí theatre in Prague. She has been freelance since 2004.

She lives in Prague with daughter Ester and son Jan.

== Books ==
- Hodiny z olova [Hours of Lead]. 2018. Brno: Host. 752pp. ISBN 9788075774743.
- MY 2 / US 2. 2014. A literary original for the feature film.
- Příspěvek k dějinám radosti [A Contribution to the History of Joy]. 2014. A novel.
- Spací vady [Sleeping Disorders]. 2012. A book edition of the theatre play.
- Kobold. Přebytky něhy & přebytky lidí [Kobold: An Abundance of Tenderness & an Abundance of People]. 2011. A double novel. Excerpts published in English.
- Smrt nebudeš se báti aneb příběh Petra Lébla [Death, You Shall not be Afraid or the Story of Petr Lébl]. 2008. A documentary novel.
- Peníze od Hitlera [Money from Hitler]. 2006. A novel.
- A já pořád kdo to tluče [The Devil by the Nose]. 2005. A novel.
- Sám sobě nepřítelem [An Enemy to Himself]. 1998. A book about the Czech theatre and film director Evald Schorm.

== Awards ==
- 2003 nominated for Alfred Radok Awards (for dramaturgical achievement, production of Thomas Bernhard’s play Heldenplatz [Heroes’ Square]. Divadlo Na zábradlí, directed by Juraj Nvota).
- 2005 Europäisches Festival des Debütromans (European Festival of the First Novel) in Kiel (the novel A já pořád kdo to tluče / The Devil by the Nose).
- 2007 Magnesia Litera award for the best prose work of the year (for the novel Peníze od Hitlera / Money from Hitler).
- 2009 Magnesia Litera award for the best book in the category of journalism (for the documentary novel Smrt, nebudeš se báti aneb Příběh Petra Lébla / Death, thou shall not be afraid alias the Story of Petr Lébl).
- 2009 nominated for Josef Škvorecký Award (for the documentary novel Death, Thou Shall not Be Afraid: the Story of Petr Lébl).
- 2009 nominated for the Angelus Central European Literary Award, Poland (for the novel Money from Hitler).
- 2011 Usedomer Literaturpreis (Usedom Literature Prize) awarded by German literary critics (for the novel Money from Hitler). Laudatio: Hellmuth Karasek.
- 2011 Magnesia Litera award for the best translation of Herta Müller’s Atemschaukel (Rozhoupaný dech).
- 2011 nominated for Josef Škvorecký Award (for the double novel Kobold).
- 2012 Annual Mladá fronta Publishing House Award for the translation of Herta Müller’s Herztier (Srdce bestie).
- 2012 Georg Dehio Book Prize (Georg-Dehio-Buchpreis), Germany, Berlin (for the novel Money from Hitler). Laudatio: Andreas Kossert.
- 2012 nominated for the Czech Book Award 2012 (for the double novel Kobold).
- 2012 nominated for the Most Beautiful Book Prize (for graphic design), International Book Fair in Frankfurt am Main (the double novel Kobold).
- 2015 nominated for the Czech Book Award 2015 (for novel A Contribution to the History of Joy).
- 2016 WALD Press AWARD (for literary work which not only explores new possibilities for the literary form of the novel itself, it also boldly breaks taboos by dealing with themes concerning society’s especially weak and vulnerable).
- 2017 nominated for the International Literary Prize Kulturhuset Stadsteatern, Sweden (for novel Money from Hitler).
- 2017 Graz City Writer (Stadtschreiber von Graz) 2017/2018, Graz, Austria
- 2019 Spycher: Literary Prize Leuk (Spycher: Literaturpreis Leuk), Switzerland (for novel A Contribution to the History of Joy).
- 2019 H. C. Artmann Prize (H. C. Artmann-Preis), Salzburg, Austria (for novel A Contribution to the History of Joy)
- 2019 Magnesia Litera Prize in the category Czech Book of the Year (for novel Hours of Lead).
- 2022 Literary Prize of the State of Styria (Literaturpreis des Landes Steiermark), Austria (for the novel Hours of Lead)
- 2022 Brücke Berlin Literature and Translation Prize (Brücke Berlin Literatur- und Übersetzungspreis), Germany (for the novel Hours of Lead)
- 2024 Medal of Merit

== Residences / Scholarships ==
- 2007 Lenka Reinerová scholarship, writer in residence, Wiesbaden, Germany (Literaturhaus Villa Clementine).
- 2008 writer in residence, Berlin, Germany (Literarisches Colloquium Berlin).
- 2010 writer in residence, Graz, Austria (Kulturvermittlung Steiermark, Internationales Haus der Autoren Graz).
- 2011 writer in residence, Usedom (Ahlbeck, Ahlbecker Hof), Germany.
- 2014 writer in residence, Škocjan on the Karst, Slovenia.
- 2017 writer in residence “Graz City Writer 2017/2018”, Graz, Austria.
- 2017 writer in residence, Leuk, Switzerland.
- 2020 writer in residence, Tainan Writers’ House, Taiwan.
