= Karel Šiktanc =

Czech poet and children's writer (1928–2021)

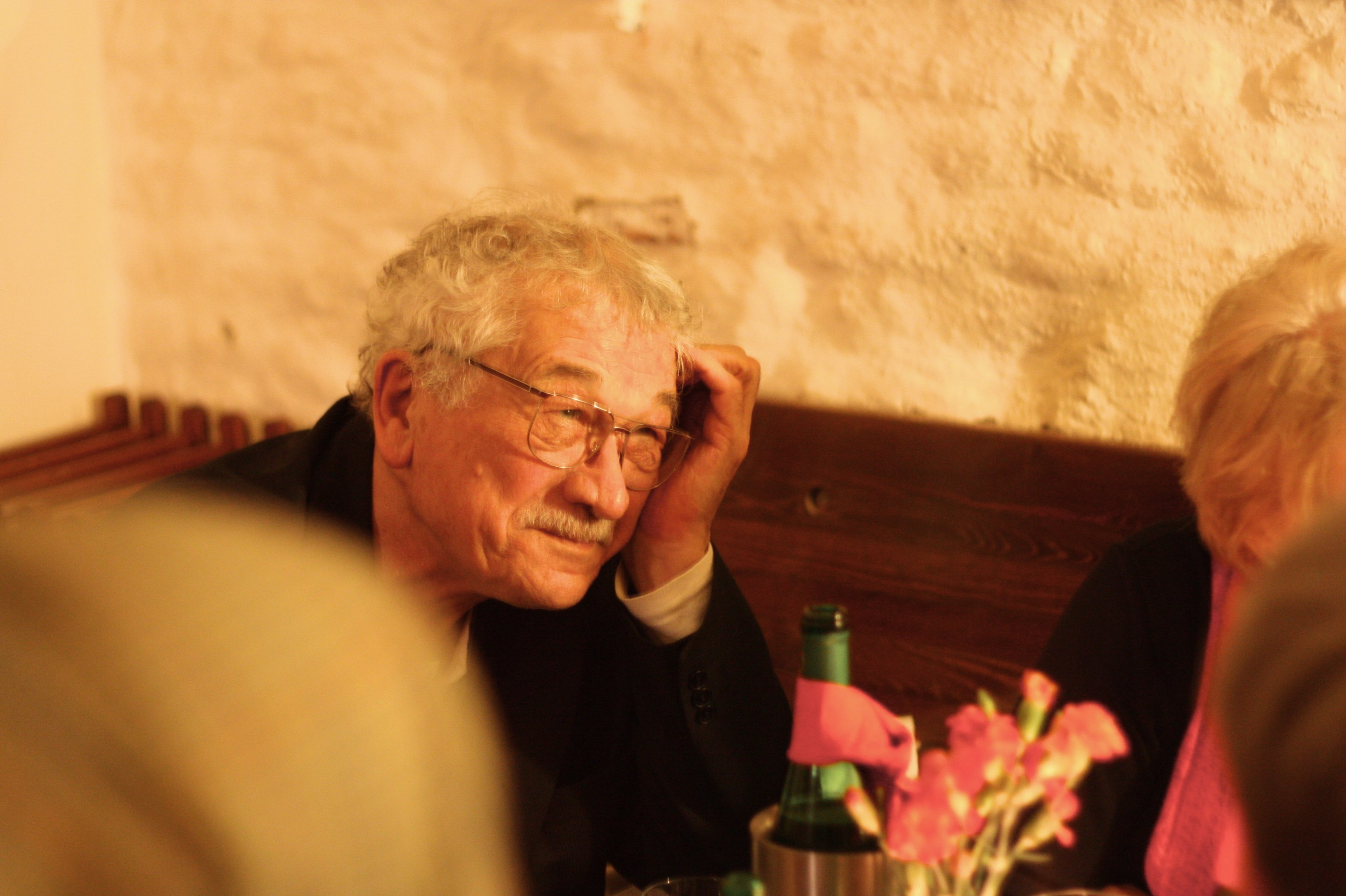
Karel Šiktanc (2010)

Karel Šiktanc (10 July 1928 – 26 December 2021) was a Czech poet and children's writer.

== Biography ==
Šiktanc was born in Hřebeč in Kladno District.

He published his first poetry collection Tobě, živote!, in 1951. Over the next seven decades, he published dozens of other collections of poetry, as well as many children's books. He also translated works by Boris Pasternak, Boris Slutsky and Yevgeny Yevtushenko into Czech and wrote dozens of television screenplays.

He died in Prague at the age of 93.

== Awards ==
In 2000, he received the Czech State Award for Literature for his poetry collection Šarlat (1999). He is a two-time winner of the Jaroslav Seifert Prize for his collections Srdce svého nejez (1989) and Nesmír (2011). He won the Magnesia Litera award for Zimoviště in 2004 and was nominated for the same prize for Nesmír in 2011. In 2010, he received the Czech Medal of Merit.
