= The Czech Book =

Literary prize

The Czech Book is a literary prize with international dimension, organized by an independent civic association based in Prague, Czech Republic. The Czech Centres of Madrid, Berlin, Paris, Vienna and Sofia cooperate in the organization of the project amongst other institutions. Since 2013, the project has been sponsored by the Ministry of Culture of the Czech Republic.

== The Czech Book Award ==
The jury, composed of seven academics, literary translators and booksellers, award every year a new narrative book, edited by a national publisher the previous year, with the Czech Book Award. The objective of the award is to promote contemporary narrative Czech literature not only in the country but also, and mainly, abroad; where the institution the “Global Observer” contributes to the diffusion of the laureates titles, reserved for foreign publishers interested in the translation of contemporary Czech writers. Over thirty publishing agencies coming from ten different countries and two continents enjoy of the observer status. The winner of the award gets a prize of 35,000 Czech crowns.

== The Czech Book Young Adult ==
It was preceded by a reader’s award, first granted in 2013. Its objective was to engage the national public in the voting on the best narrative novelty. The associated media involved included: the magazine Xantypa, weekly Reflex, K Revue, electronic magazine Vaše literatura and the Portal of Czech Literature. In 2017, it was replaced by The Czech Book Young Adult.

== Laureates ==
=== 2012 ===
- Vladimír Binar: Číňanova pěna, ISBN 978-80-87256-52-7; the French translation was published by the Paris publisher Non Lieu in 2014, the same year the translation to Bulgarian was published by the Sofia SONM publisher. The translation to Polish is being prepared.

=== 2013 ===
- The Czech Book Award: Jakuba Katalpa: Němci, ISBN 978-80-7294-682-2
- The Czech Book Reader’s Award: Kateřina Tučková: Žítkovské bohyně, ed. Host, ISBN 978-80-7294-528-3

=== 2014 ===
- The Czech Book Award: Jan Němec: Dějiny světla, ed. Host, ISBN 978-80-7294-962-5
- The Czech Book Reader’s Award: Věra Nosková, Proměny, ISBN 978-80-87373-38-5

=== 2015 ===
- The Czech Book Award: Jan Němec: Dějiny světla, ed. Host, ISBN 978-80-7294-962-5
- The Czech Book Reader’s Award: David Vaughan, Slyšte můj hlas, ISBN 978-80-87530-42-9

=== 2016 ===
- The Czech Book Award: Markéta Baňková: Maličkost. Romance z času genetiky, ed. Argo, ISBN 978-80-257-1673-1
- The Czech Book Reader’s Award: Tomáš Šebek, Mise Afghánistán, ISBN 978-80-7432-656-1

=== 2017 ===
- The Czech Book Award: Jiří Hájíček: Dešťová hůl, ed. Host, ISBN 978-80-7491-773-8
- The Czech Book Young Adult: Bianca Bellová, Jezero, ed. Host, ISBN 978-80-7491-771-4

=== 2018 ===
- The Czech Book Award and The Czech Book Young Adult: Alena Mornštajnová: Hana, ed. Host, ISBN 978-80-7491-940-4

=== 2019 ===
- The Czech Book Award: Anna Cima: Probudím se na Šibuji, ed. Paseka, ISBN 978-80-7432-912-8
- The Czech Book Reader’s Award: Jan Štifter : Sběratel sněhu, ed. Vyšehrad, ISBN 978-80-742-9984-1

=== 2020 ===
- The Czech Book Award: Bianca Bellová : Mona, ed. Host, ISBN 978-80-7577-962-5
- The Czech Book Reader’s Award: Jana Poncrarová : Eugenie : Příběh české hoteliérky, ed. Motto, ISBN 978-80-267-1651-8
