= Truchlivý Bůh =

Novel by Jiří Kratochvil

First edition (publ. Petrov)

Truchlivý Bůh is a Czech novel, written by Jiří Kratochvil. It was first published in 2000.
