= Jan Žižka: život a doba husitského válečníka =

- Cover of the book.
- Author: Petr Čornej
- Language: Czech
- Genre: Biography
- Publisher: Paseka
- Publication date: 2019
- Publication place: Czech Republic
- Pages: 856
- ISBN: 978-80-7432-990-6

Jan Žižka: život a doba husitského válečníka (English: Jan Žižka: The Life and Times of a Hussite Warrior) is a Czech book by historian Petr Čornej, published by Paseka in 2019 to mark the 600th anniversary of the beginning of the Hussite Revolution. The approximately 900-page book is divided into eight chapters and 63 subchapters, tracing the life of Jan Žižka from his youth to his death. The book represents the culmination of Čornej's lifelong interest in the Hussite period.

== Background and Publication ==
Petr Čornej worked on the book for 16 years, while the actual writing took him 15 months. He presented it to the public on 4 December 2019 at Housův Mill in Tábor.

== Summary ==
The book examines Jan Žižka's life and military career in the wider context of the political, social and religious developments of the late 14th and early 15th centuries. It explores his motivations and his transformation into one of the leading military commanders of the Hussite Wars.

Čornej places particular emphasis on Žižka's military achievements, political activities and relationships with other Hussite leaders. The book also examines the development of the Hussite movement, the internal conflicts among its factions and the wider circumstances of the Hussite Wars.

The author tries to provide a comprehensive historical portrait based on contemporary sources and modern historical research. He also discusses several disputed or uncertain aspects of Žižka's life, distinguishing documented facts from later traditions and legends.

== Reception ==
=== Awards ===
The book won the 2020 Magnesia Litera award for Book of the Year and also received the award in the non-fiction category.
