= Petr Kabeš =

Czech poet (1941–2005)

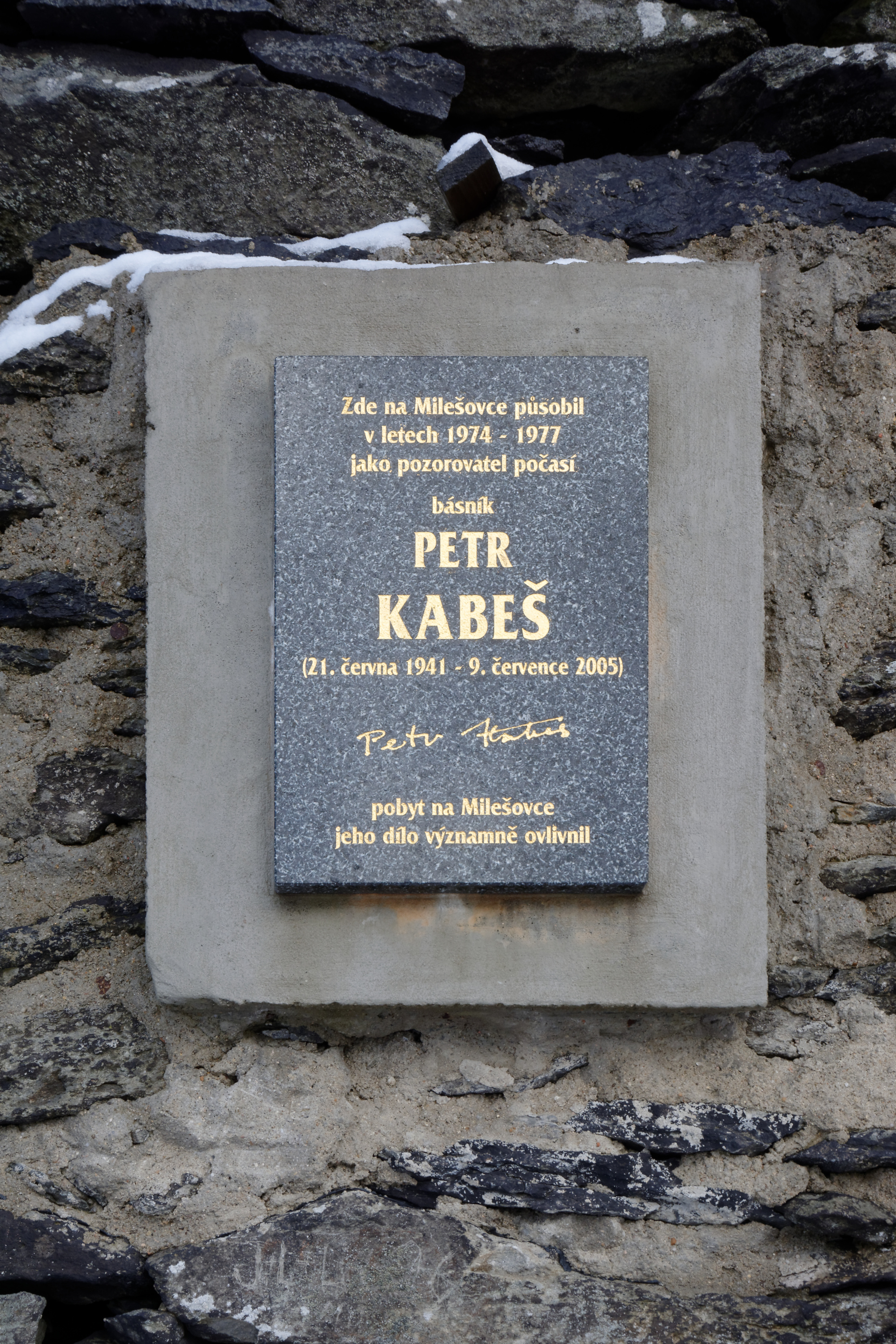
Memorial plaque at Milešovka

Petr Kabeš (21 June 1941 in Pardubice – 9 July 2005 in Prague) was a Czech poet.

== Biography ==
Kabeš was born in Pardubice and studied at the Prague University of Economics and Business.

He published his first collection Čáry na dlani in 1961. Two more books followed: Zahrady na boso (1963) and Mrtvá sezona (1968). His next collection Odklad krajiny was made in 1970 but the entire print was destroyed before release and Kabeš was subsequently banned until 1989. During the years of the publication ban, he worked as a weather observer at Milešovka and night watchman. He was a signatory of Charter 77.

In 1995, he was awarded the Jaroslav Seifert Prize, presented by the Charter 77 Foundation, for his book Pěší věc. He received the Czech State Award for Literature for Těžítka, ta těžítka in 2003.

He was married to translator Anna Kareninová.

He died in Prague at the age of 64.
