= Jan Balabán =

Czech writer, journalist, and translator

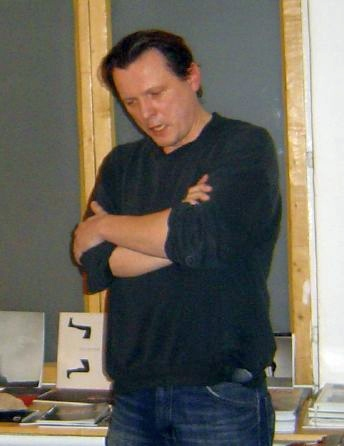
- Jan Balabán in 2007
- Born: 29 January 1961; Šumperk, Czechoslovakia
- Died: 23 April 2010 (aged 49)
- Citizenship: European (EU) from 2004
- Occupations: Writer, journalist, translator
- Writing career
- Period: 1980s–2010
- Genres: Existentialism, art criticism, technical translation
- Literary movement: Prirozeni

Jan Balabán (29 January 1961 – 23 April 2010) was a Czech writer, journalist, and translator. He was considered an existentialist whose works often dealt with the wretched and desperate aspects of the human condition.

== Partial biography ==
Balabán was actually born in Šumperk, Czechoslovakia, but he had already moved with his family to Ostrava by the time he was a year old. He graduated from Palacký University, Olomouc with a degree from the Department of Philosophy. Following graduation, he visited England, Canada and the United States. In 1984 he had a two-month internship at Kings College in Aberdeen in Scotland. His first serious publication was a book of short stories – "The Middle Ages" in 1985. He then worked as a technical translator at the Vítkovice ironworks and later as a freelance translator and journalist, making regular contributions to the magazine Respekt. He also translated the works of H. P. Lovecraft and Terry Eagleton into Czech.

In the 1990s, he, along with Petr Hruška, participated in publishing the magazine Landek. Speaking of his steel-town home city, he recalled William Faulkner (to whom he was compared), saying: "If you write about a place, you not only love it, but find much to hate." Also a connoisseur of the arts, Balabán's knowledge allowed him to write articles and essays for relevant art journals, exhibitions, catalogs and newspapers. A founding member of the group Prirozeni (The Natural – founded 1980), Balabán helped proliferate the underground arts community and rehabilitate the urban landscape by organizing exhibitions in attics, hallways, in subways and on slag heaps in the suburbs of Ostrava. One of Balabán's most important works, Možná že odcházíme (Maybe We're Leaving), is a collection of twenty stories in just a hundred pages. The stories deal with characters inspired by people from his home city and the difficult periods in their lives as they suffer disappointments and failures at work and home.

Balabán died on 23 April 2010 at the age of 49. In the week leading up to his death, he was at a month-long authors' festival held in both his home town of Ostrava and Brno. Balabán was divorced with two children. In the last three years he had been working on a new book that dealt with the death of his father.

== Published works ==
- Středověk, Sfinga, 1995 (Middle Ages)
- Boží lano, Vetus Via, 1998 (God's Rope)
- Prázdniny, Host, 1998, (Holiday)
- Černý beran, Host, 2000 (The Black Ram)
- Srdce draka, Aluze, 2001 (The Heart of the Dragon)
- Kudy šel anděl, Vetus Via, 2003, Host, 2005
  - Where Was the Angel Going?, translated by Charles S. Kraszewski, Glagoslav Publications 2020, ISBN 978-1912894284
- Možná že odcházíme, Host, 2004
  - Maybe We're Leaving, translated by Charles S. Kraszewski, Glagoslav Publications 2018, ISBN 978-1911414698
- Jsme tady, Host, 2006
- Bezruč?!, 2009 – drama (along with Ivan Motyl, first performed 2009 in Ostrava)

== Awards ==
- "Maybe We're Leaving" – the Magnesia Litera 2005 for prose – as well as a nomination for the "State Prize for Literature".
