= Michal Ajvaz =

Czech novelist, poet and translator

Michal Ajvaz (born 30 October 1949 in Prague) is a Czech novelist, poet and translator, an exponent of the literary style known as magic realism.

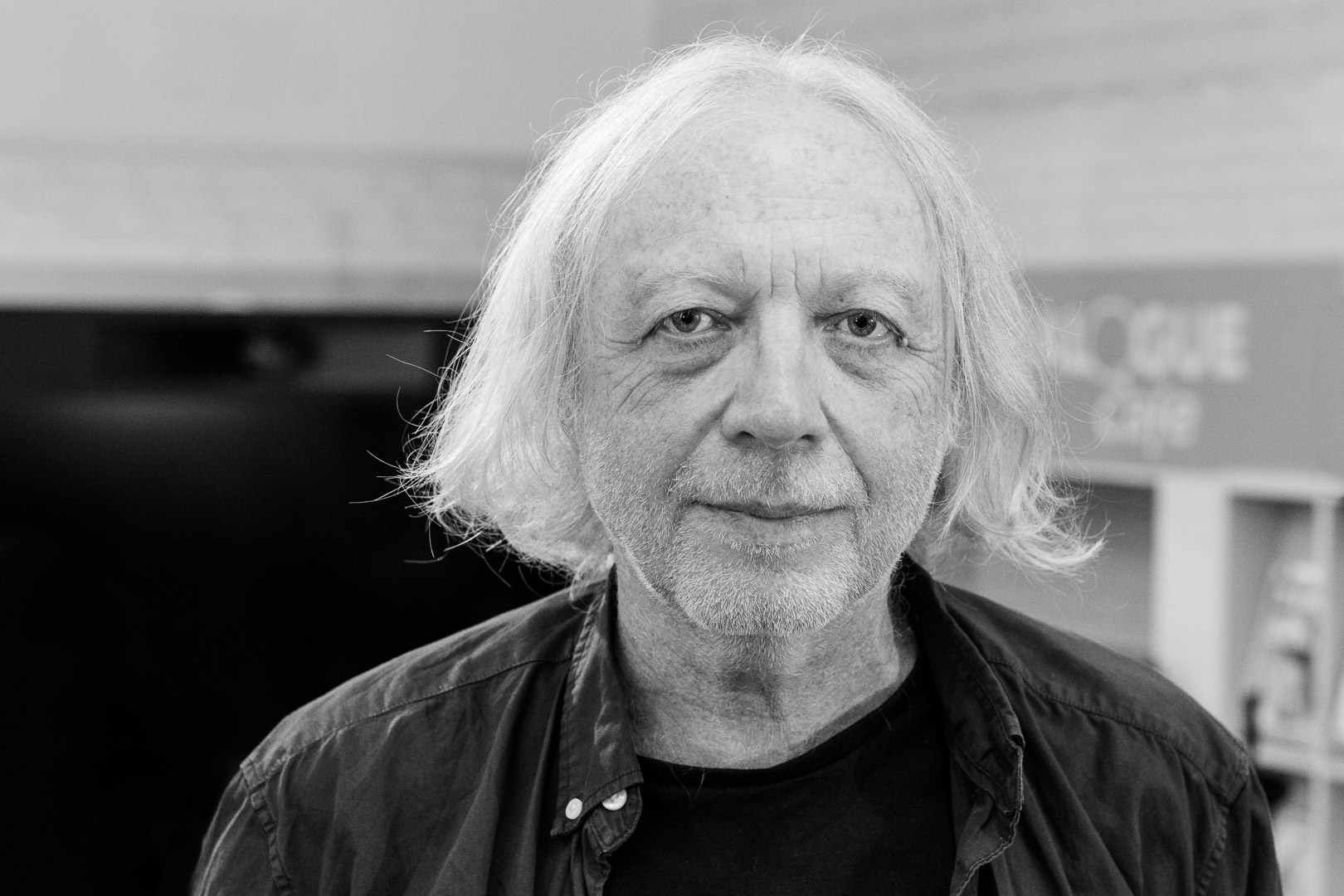
Michal Ajvaz, 2015

== Biography ==
Born into a family of Russian exiles, Ajvaz studied Czech studies and aesthetics at Charles University in Prague. Between 1996 and 1999 he worked as an editor of Literární noviny. Since then he has been mainly engaged in writing. Since 2003 he has been employed at the Center for Theoretical Studies of the Academy of Sciences and Charles University. He currently works as a researcher at Prague's Centre for Theoretical Studies and, in addition to fiction, has published an essay on Derrida and a book-length meditation on Borges. His novel Prázdné ulice was awarded the Jaroslav Seifert Prize for literary achievement (2005), the most prestigious literary award in the Czech Republic. In this novel the narrator becomes somehow connected to the mysterious disappearance of a young woman.On his journey in search of her, he passes through various places, from cafes and train stations to luxurious villas. He won the Magnesia Litera 2012 award (book of the year) for his novel Lucemburská zahrada and the 2020 Czech State Award for Literature for his body of work to-date.

Some of books written by Michal Ajvaz have also been published in other countries. We can also find translated copies of his books in twenty four different languages.

== Bibliography ==
This incomplete list gives the titles of Ajvaz's works.

- 1989 – Vražda v hotelu Intercontinental (Murder in the Intercontinental Hotel; poems)
- 1991 – Návrat starého varana (Return of the Old Komodo Dragon; stories)
- 1993 – Druhé město (The Other City; novel)
- 1994 – Znak a bytí: Úvahy nad Derridovou gramatologií (Sign and Being: Reflections on Derrida's Grammatology)
- 1997 – Tyrkysový orel (Turquoise Eagle; 2 short novels)
- 1997 – Tajemství knihy (Secret of the Book; essays)
- 2001 – Zlatý věk (The Golden Age; novel)
- 2003 – Světelný prales: Úvahy o vidění (The Luminous Primeval Forest: Essays on Seeing)
- 2003 – Sny gramatik, záře písmen. Setkání s Jorgem Luisem Borgesem (Dreams of Grammars, Shine of Letters. Meeting with Jorge Luis Borges)
- 2004 – Prázdné ulice (Empty Streets; novel)
- 2006 – Příběh znaků a prázdna (Story of Signs and Emptiness; essays)
- 2006 – Padesát pět měst (55 Cities)
- 2007 – L'autre île (French translation of Zlatý věk)
- 2008 – Cesta na jih (Voyage to the South; novel)
- 2009 – The Other City (English translation)
- 2010 – The Golden Age (English translation)
- 2011 – Lucemburská zahrada (Luxembourg Gardens; novel)
- 2016 – Empty Streets (English translation)
- 2019 – Města (Cities; novel)

== See also ==
- List of Czech writers
