= Oldřich Král =

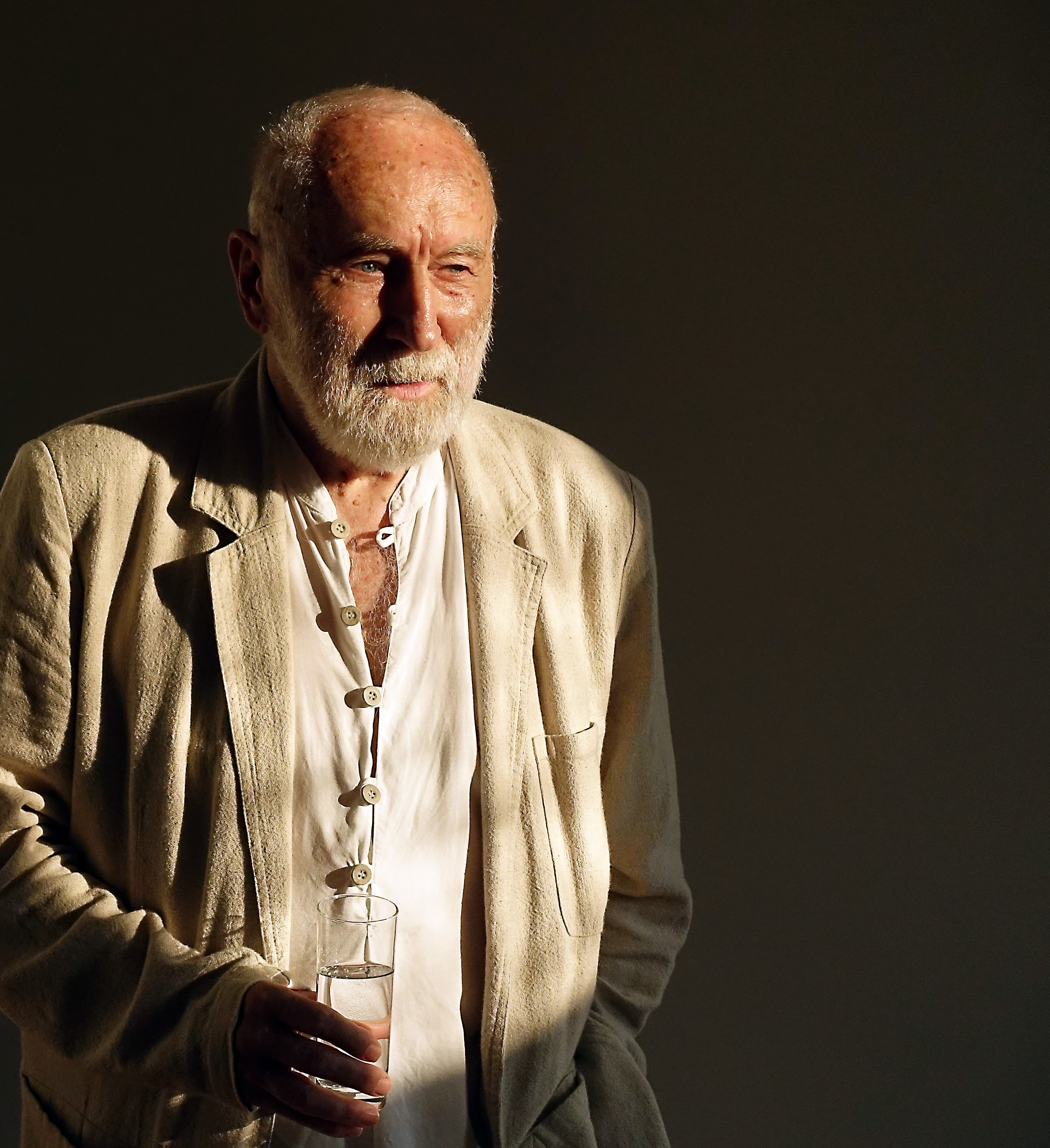
Oldřich Král in 2016

Oldřich Král (13 September 1930 – 21 June 2018), also known by his Chinese name Wang Heda (Chinese: 王和达), was a Czech sinologist, translator and writer.

== Biography ==
Král was born on 13 September 1930 in Prague. He entered Charles University in 1949 and began his studies in Chinese language and literature. In the 1950s and 60s, he spent two periods studying at Peking University, during which time he translated Ba Jin's novel The Family and the Qing dynasty novel The Scholars. After that, he devoted his life to the translation of Chinese literature and philosophical works into the Czech language. His translations include the I Ching, Tao Te Ching, Zhuangzi, The Platform Sutra of the Sixth Patriarch, The Art of War, The Gateless Barrier, The Literary Mind and the Carving of Dragons, and Journey to the West. His translation of Cao Xueqin's classic novel Dream of the Red Chamber won the Odeon Publisher Award for the best translation in 1988 and at the celebration of the 240th anniversary of Cao Xueqin's death Král received the International Award (Beijing 2003). For all his work Král also received the Czech State Award for Translation in 2010 and the Chinese Award for Translation in 2017.

In 1993, Král became professor of sinology at Charles University and reestablished a Comparative Literature as a field of study there. He travelled frequently to China, and his last trip to China was in June 2018, just before his death.

Král died on 21 June 2018, at the age of 87. He had been working on translating the Chinese classic novel Jin Ping Mei before his death.
