= Jaroslav Seifert Prize =

- Awarded for: Poetry or fiction published in the past three years in the Czech Republic or abroad
- Country: Czech Republic
- Currently held by: Jiří Brabec and Jiří Opelík

The Jaroslav Seifert Prize (Czech: Cena Jaroslava Seiferta) is a Czech literary prize created by the Charta 77 Foundation in Stockholm in January 1986. This prize is named after the Nobel Prize–winning Czechoslovak writer, poet and journalist, Jaroslav Seifert, and is awarded for an excellent work of poetry or fiction published (or otherwise made public) in the past three years in the Czech Republic or abroad. It was originally awarded to authors in exile during the Soviet era. The laureate is announced on September 22 each year, on the eve of Seifert's birth anniversary. As of 2019, the prize is awarded every two years.

== Laureates ==
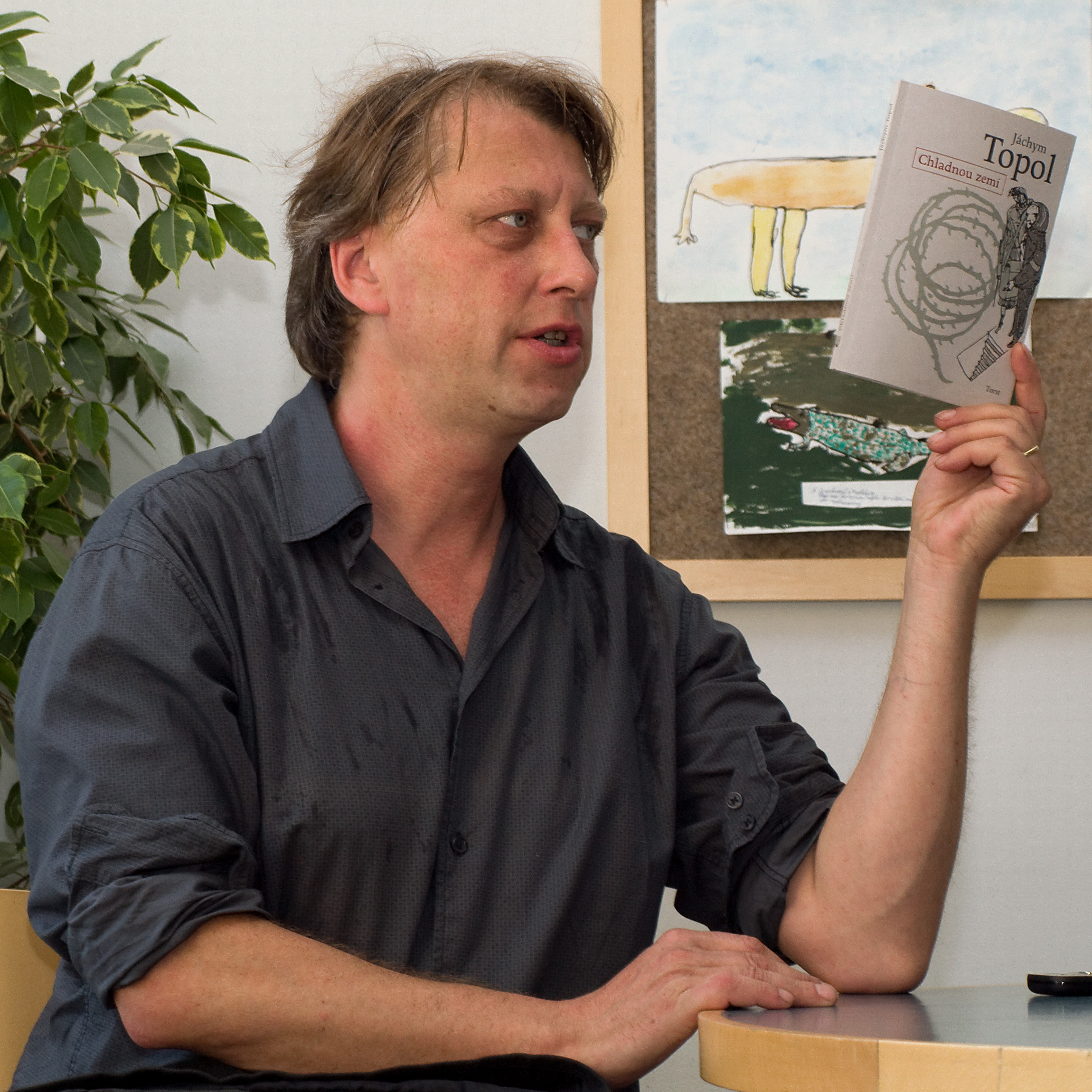
Winner Jáchym Topol in 2010

Year	Author	Awarded Achievement	Reference
2022	Josef Kroutvor	For the novel The Flight of a Bird	
2019	Miroslav Petříček		
2017	Jiří Brabec	For lifetime achievement	-
2017	Jiří Opelík	For lifetime achievement	-
2016	No prize awarded		-
2015	Eugen Brikcius	For the collection A tělo se stalo slovem	
2014	No prize awarded		-
2013	No prize awarded		-
2012	Vladimir Binar	Číňanova pěna	-
2011	Karel Šiktanc	For the poetry collection Nesmír	-
2010	Jáchym Topol	For the novel Chladnou zemí	
2009	Ludvík Kundera		
2008	Václav Havel		
2007	František Listopad	For the poetry collection Rosa definitiva	-
2006	Ivan Martin Jirous	For his lifetime poetic work and prison correspondence Magorovy dopisy	
2005	Michal Ajvaz	For the novel Prázdné ulice	
2005	Jiří Suchý	For the Encyklopedii Jiřího Suchého	-
2004	Josef Škvorecký	For lifetime achievement	-
2004	Viktor Fischl	For lifetime achievement	-
2003	Miloslav Topinka	For the poetry book Trhlina	-
2002	Jiří Gruša	For the poetry collection Wacht am Rhein aneb Putovní ghetto	-
2001	Zdeněk Rotrekl	For the poetry book Nezděné město	-
2000	Pavel Šrut	For the poetry books Zlá milá and Brožované básně	-
1999	Jiří Kratochvil	For the novel Noční tango aneb Román jednoho léta z konce století	-
1998	Věra Linhartová	For Mes oubliettes (Napospas času)	-
1997	Karel Milota	For the collections Antilogie aneb protisloví and Ďáblův dům	-
1996	Jiřina Hauková	For the collection Světlo v září	-
1996	Zbyněk Hejda	For the collection Valse mélancolique	-
1995	Petr Kabeš	For the collection Pěší věc	-
1995	Antonín Brousek	For the collection Vteřinové smrti	-
1994	Milan Kundera	For the novel Nesmrtelnost	-
1993	Bohumil Hrabal	For the trilogy Svatby v domě, Vita nuova and Proluky	-
1992	Josef Hiršal	For Píseň mládí	-
1992	Ivan Wernisch	For a collection of poetry translations Frc	-
1991	Jiří Kolář	For the poetry collection Prométheova játra	-
1990	Emil Juliš	For the poetry collections Blížíme se ohni and Gordická hlava	-
1989	Karel Šiktanc	For the poetry collection Srdce svého nejez	-
1988	Ivan Diviš	For the collection Žalmy	-
1987	Ludvík Vaculík	For his essays.	-
1986	Dominik Tatarka	For the trilogy Písačky	-

== See also ==
- List of Czech literary awards
