= Daniela Hodrová =

Czech writer and literary scholar (1946–2024)

- Born: 5 July 1946; Prague, Czechoslovakia
- Died: 30 August 2024 (aged 78); Prague, Czech Republic
- Education: Charles University
- Occupations: Writer, literary scholar
- Spouse: Karel Milota (1937–2002)
- Writing career
- Notable awards: Franz Kafka Prize (2012); Magnesia Litera (2016)

Daniela Hodrová (5 July 1946 – 30 August 2024) was a Czech writer and literary scholar.

== Biography ==
Hodrová was born in Prague on 5 July 1946. She did postgraduate studies in French and comparative literature. In 1972–75, she worked as an editor of Slavonic literature in the Odeon publishing house. From 1975, she worked at the Institute of Czech Literature of the Academy of Sciences (prior to 1993 known as the Institute of Czech and World Literature of the Czechoslovak Academy of Sciences), where she was a Senior Researcher.

Her novels typically incorporate topics from her work as a literary scholar, "especially the classification of novels into roman-realité and the roman-invention, or the pioneering theory about the meaning and forms of the initiation storyline in a work of literature." She is perhaps best known for a trilogy called Trýznivé město (City of Torment), they are distinctive "Prague novels, which aim to convey emblematically the genius loci of this central European city, of whose history Hodrová highlights the tragic features."

Some of her works have been translated into English, such as Prague, I See a City... (translated by David Short, 2011) and the trilogy City of Torment (translated by Véronique Firkusny and Elena Sokol, 2021), both published by Jantar Publishing.

Hodrová died on 30 August 2024, at the age of 78.

== Bibliography ==
- Podobojí (1991). A Kingdom of Souls, trans. Véronique Firkusny and Elena Sokol (Jantar Publishing, 2015) or later as In Both Kinds (in City of Torment)
- Kukly (1991). Puppets
- Théta (1991)
- Město vidím... (1992). Prague, I See a City..., trans. David Short (Jantar Publishing, 2011)
- Perunův den (1994)
- Ztracené děti (1997)
- Trýznivé město (1999). City of Torment, trans. Véronique Firkusny and Elena Sokol (Jantar Publishing, 2021). Compiles Podobojí, Kukly and Théta.
- Komedie (2003)
- Vyvolávání (2010)
- Točité věty (2015)
- Ta blízkost (2019)
- Co přichází aneb Cesta na Kouzelný vrch (2024)
