= Franz Kafka Prize =

Literary award

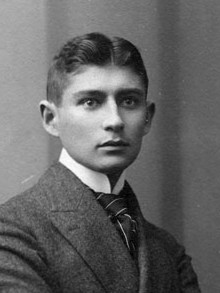
- Country: Czech Republic
- Presented by: Franz Kafka Society
- Reward: $10,000
- First award: 2001
- Final award: 2021
- Website: http://www.franzkafka-soc.cz/cena-franze-kafky/

The Franz Kafka Prize was an international literary award presented in honour of Franz Kafka, the Jewish, Bohemian, German-language novelist. The prize was first awarded in 2001 and was co-sponsored by the Franz Kafka Society and the city of Prague, Czech Republic.

== Award information and history ==
At a presentation held annually in the Old Town Hall (Prague), the recipient received $10,000, a diploma, and a bronze statuette. Each award is often called the "Kafka Prize" or "Kafka Award".

The award earned some prestige in the mid 2000s by foreshadowing the Nobel Prize when two of its winners went on to win the Nobel Prize in Literature the same year, Elfriede Jelinek (2004) and Harold Pinter (2005).

The criteria for winning the award include the artwork's "humanistic character and contribution to cultural, national, language [sic] and religious tolerance, its existential, timeless character, its generally human validity and its ability to hand over [sic] a testimony about our times."

== Award winners ==
Previous winners:

Year	Picture	Winner	Nationality	Language(s)	Genre(s)	Ref.
2021		Ivan Vyskočil (1929–2023)	Czech Republic	Czech	novel, drama	
2020		Milan Kundera (1929–2023)	France/Czech Republic	French/Czech	novel, short story, poetry, essay, drama	
2019		Pierre Michon (1945–)	France	French	novel, short story	
2018		Ivan Wernisch (1942–)	Czech Republic	Czech	poetry, translation	
2017		Margaret Atwood (1939–)	Canada	English	poetry, novel, short story, literary criticism, essay	
2016		Claudio Magris (1939–)	Italy	Italian	essay, translation, novel, short story	
2015		Eduardo Mendoza (1943–)	Spain	Spanish	novel, short story, drama, essay	
2014		Yan Lianke (1958–)	China	Chinese	novel, short story	
2013		Amos Oz (1939–2018)	Israel	Hebrew	novel, short story, essay	
2012		Daniela Hodrová (1946–2024)	Czech Republic	Czech	novel	
2011		John Banville (1945–)	Ireland	English	novel, short story, drama, screenplay, essay	
2010		Václav Havel (1936–2011)	Czech Republic	Czech	poetry, drama, essay	
2009		Peter Handke (1942–)	Austria	German	novel, poetry, essay, short story, screenplay, drama	
2008		Arnošt Lustig (1926–2011)	Czech Republic	Czech	novel, short story, drama, screenplay	
2007		Yves Bonnefoy (1923–2016)	France	French	poetry, essay, translation, short story, history	
2006		Haruki Murakami (1949–)	Japan	Japanese	novel, short story, essay, memoirs	
2005		Harold Pinter (1930–2008)	United Kingdom	English	drama, screenplay	
2004		Elfriede Jelinek (1946–)	Austria	German	novel, poetry, drama, translation	
2003		Péter Nádas (1942–2026)	Hungary	Hungarian	drama, essay, novel	
2002		Ivan Klíma (1931–2025)	Czech Republic	Czech	novel, drama, memoirs	
2001		Philip Roth (1933–2018)	United States	English	novel, short story, memoirs, essay	

== See also ==
- List of literary awards
- List of Czech literary awards
