= Jindřich Pokorný =

Czech translator, editor and writer (1927–2014)

Jindřich Pokorný (12 April 1927 – 23 August 2014) was a Czech translator, editor and writer. He translated in French, German, Italian, Latin and Flemish.

In 1950, Pokorný graduated from Charles University in Prague. He did further study under Jan Patočka and later worked for Czech Radio from 1965 to 1970. After his retirement from radio, Pokorný became active in samizdat activities. He sat on the Czech Radio Council from 1992 to 1997 and served the Rainer Maria Rilke Foundation as its president from 1992 to 1998. Pokorný also had two stints as a lecturer at his alma mater.

He was known for his translation of Edmond Rostand's play Cyrano de Bergerac. Pokorný also translated the works of Voltaire, Victor Hugo, and Rainer Maria Rilke, among others. In 2014, he received the French Order of Academic Palms for his work.

In 2009 he published a book titled Parsifal. He died on 23 August 2014 at the age of 87.
