= Zdeněk Rotrekl =

Czech Catholic poet, literary historian and writer

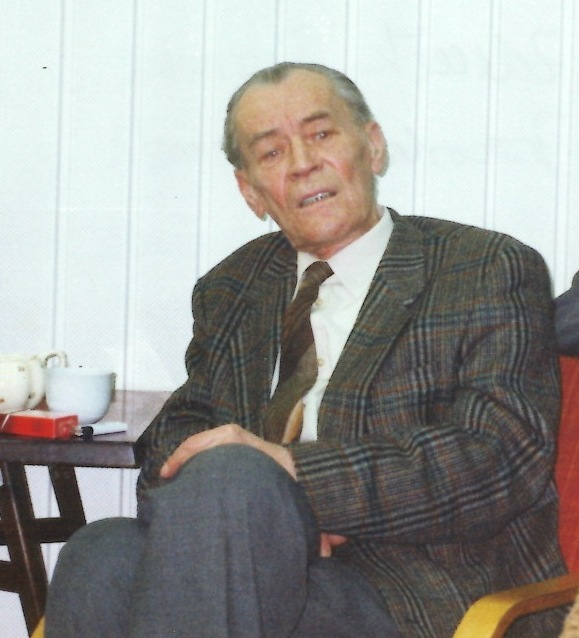
Zdeněk Rotrekl 1996

Zdeněk Rotrekl (1 October 1920 – 9 June 2013) was a Czech Catholic poet, literary historian and writer. He was severely persecuted for his work and Catholic beliefs during Czechoslovakia's Communist era from 1948 to 1989, including thirteen years in prison. The Communist government also banned his work for more than forty years. The Prague Daily Monitor has called him "one of the most distinguished personalities of the Catholic stream in Czech poetry of the latter half of the 20th century."

== Life ==
Rotrekl was born in 1920 in Brno, Czechoslovakia. He published his first full volume of poetry when he was just 20 years old. He enrolled at Faculty of Arts in Brno in the aftermath of World War II, where he pursued studies in Sanskrit, history and art history. However, he was expelled from the university following the 1948 Czechoslovak coup d'état for supporting democracy. Prior to 1948, Rotrekl had published three books of poetry.

Following his expulsion from his university, Rotrekl was sentenced to death in a 1949 show trial. His sentence was later commuted to life in prison, ultimately spending thirteen years imprisoned by Czechoslovakia's Communist authorities. Rotrekl worked in blue collar positions after his release. The government banned him from publishing his work for more than 40 years, from 1948 to 1989. He was only able to release his writings through the samizdat, or dissident, networks.

He completed his undergraduate degree during the late 1960s, and was hired as a journalist for Obroda (Renewal) magazine. Rotrekl was removed from his positions following the Warsaw Pact invasion of Czechoslovakia which crushed the Prague Spring. He was essentially blacklisted by the Communist government throughout the 1970s and 1980s.

President of the Czech Republic Václav Havel the Order of Tomáš Garrigue Masaryk in 1995. He also received the Jaroslav Seifert Prize, a Czech literary award, in 2001.

Zdeněk Rotrekl died in Brno, Czech Republic on 9 June 2013, at the age of 92. His funeral was held at St Thomas Church in Brno on 15 June 2013.
