= Moutnice =

- Municipality
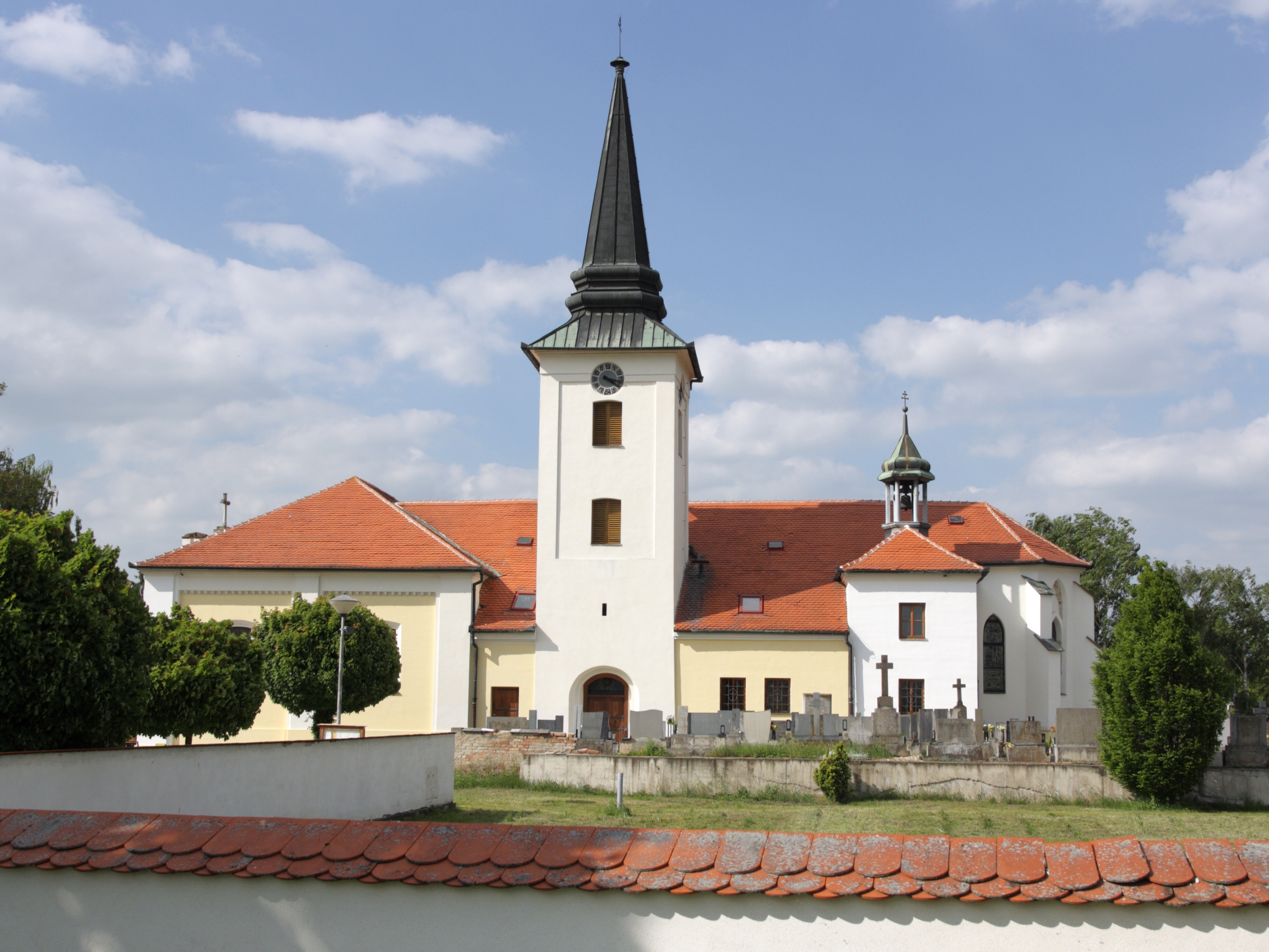
- Church of Saint Giles

- Flag Coat of arms

- Location in the Czech Republic
- Coordinates: 49°2′57″N 16°44′15″E
- Country: Czech Republic
- Region: South Moravian
- District: Brno-Country
- First mentioned: 1298

Area
  - Total: 7.09 km^{2} (2.74 sq mi)
- Elevation: 197 m (646 ft)

Population (2026-01-01)
  - Total: 1,157
  - Density: 163/km^{2} (423/sq mi)
- Time zone: UTC+1 (CET)
  - Summer (DST): UTC+2 (CEST)
- Postal code: 664 55
- Website: www.oumoutnice.cz

Moutnice is a municipality and village in Brno-Country District in the South Moravian Region of the Czech Republic. It has about 1,200 inhabitants.

Moutnice lies approximately 19 kilometres (12 mi) south-east of Brno and 203 km (126 mi) south-east of Prague.

== Demographics ==
Historical population
Year	Pop.	±%
1869	710	—
1880	824	+16.1%
1890	902	+9.5%
1900	926	+2.7%
1910	1,061	+14.6%
1921	1,060	−0.1%
1930	1,074	+1.3%
1950	1,008	−6.1%
1961	1,118	+10.9%
1970	1,119	+0.1%
1980	1,130	+1.0%
1991	1,054	−6.7%
2001	1,089	+3.3%
2011	1,142	+4.9%
2021	1,104	−3.3%
Source: Censuses
