= Anna Kareninová =

Czech translator

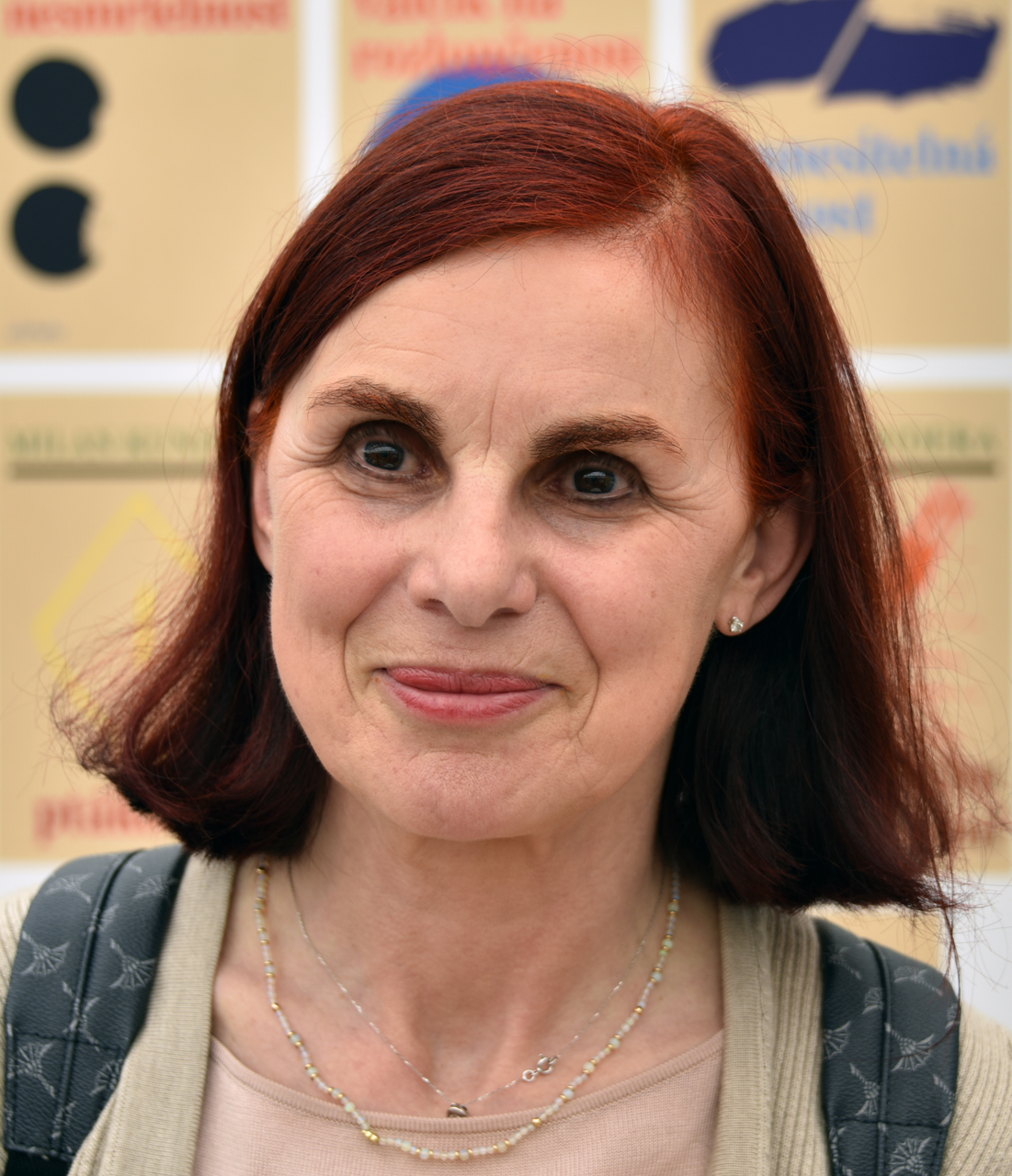
Anna Kareninová (2019)

Anna Kareninová, formerly Fureková, (born 28 March 1954 in Prague) is a Czech translator from English, French and Italian.

She translated all the Louis-Ferdinand Céline novels into Czech, as well as the complete Cantos by Ezra Pound. She also translated works by Guillaume Apollinaire, René Char, Annie Girardot, Michel de Ghelderode, Nathalie Sarraute and several books by Marguerite Duras. She also translates Milan Kundera's French-language novels into Czech, his native language. In 2019, she received the Czech State Award for Translation for her body of work.

From 1991 to 1996, she was the editor-in-chief of Světová literatura.

She was married to poet Petr Kabeš.

In 2021, she was awarded the Ordre des Arts et des Lettres.
