= Jiří Kratochvil =

Czech writer (born 1940)

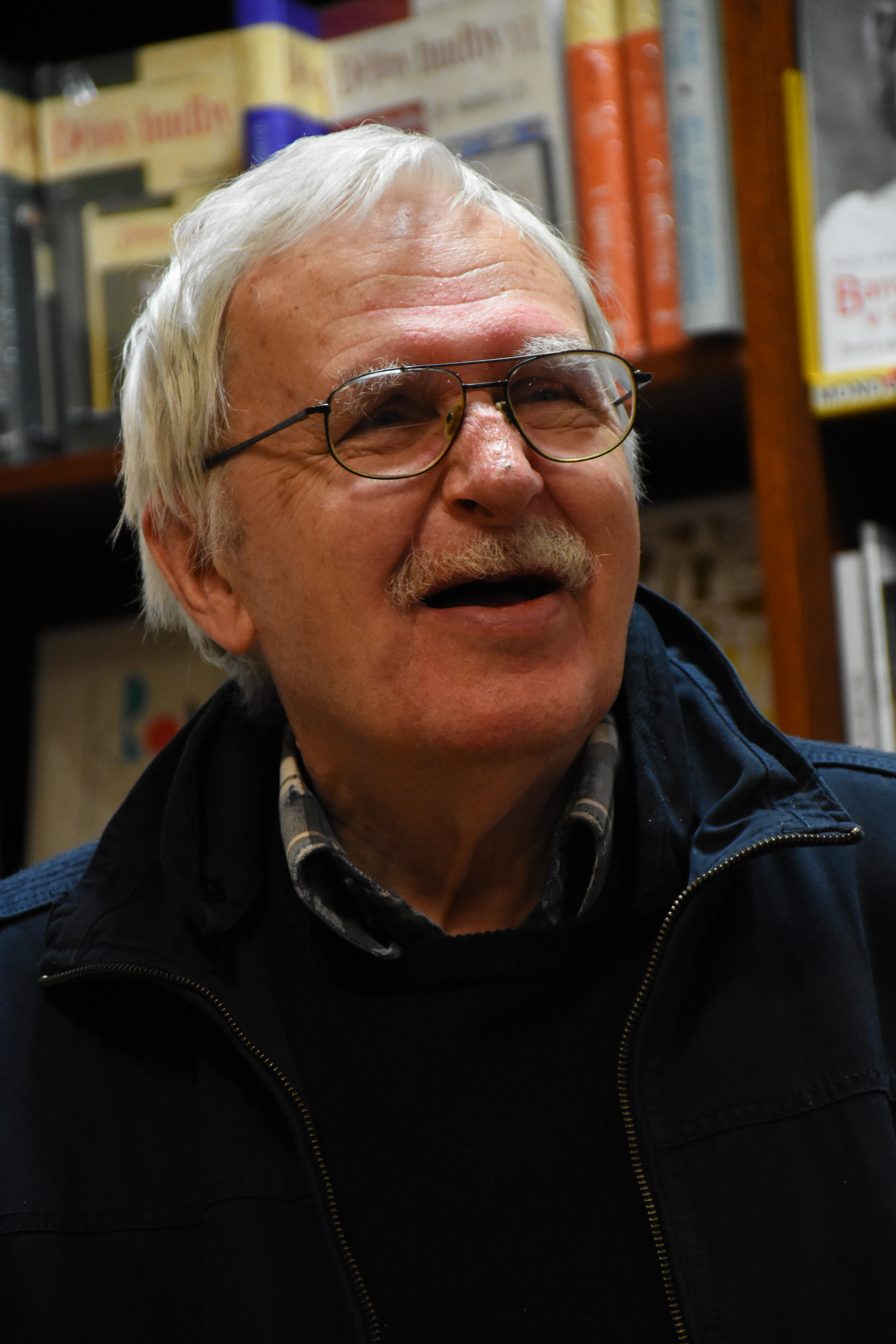
Jiří Kratochvil (2017)

Jiří Kratochvil (born 4 January 1940) is a Czech writer.

In 1991 Tom Stoppard Prize for his book Medvědí román ("A Bear's Novel"). In 1999 he was awarded the Jaroslav Seifert Prize.

== Selected works ==
- Medvědí román (1990; "A Bear's Novel") (Winner of the 1991 Tom Stoppard Prize)
- Uprostřed nocí zpěv (1992, 2010)
- Avion (1995)
- Siamský příběh (1996)
- Nesmrtelný příběh (1997)
- Noční tango (1999)
- Urmedvěd (1999)
- Truchlivý Bůh (2000) ("Mournful God")
- Lady Carneval (2004)
- Herec (2006)
- Slib (2009)
  - "The Vow", English translation by Charles S. Kraszewski, Glagoslav Publications, 2021, ISBN 978-1-914337-55-0
- Femme fatale (2010)
- Dobrou noc, sladké sny (2012)
- Alfa Centauri (2013)
- Jízlivá potměšilost žití (2017)
- Je suis Paris (2018)
- Liška v dámu (2019)
