= The Promise (Kratochvil novel) =

Czech novel

Slib is a Czech novel, written by Jiří Kratochvil. It was first published in 2009.

== Contents ==
The central character of the novel is the Brno architect Modráček, who did not get the opportunity to fully express his artistic talent and suspects that the social situation of the 1950s will no longer allow him to do so. The cruel political trials, of which his sister also became a victim, gradually awaken in him crazy plans for revenge. The impulses and at the same time the inspiration for his actions provide him with his own memories, confirmed by coincidences, to which he attaches fateful significance.

He personified the cause of his sister's death in the StB officer Lásek. The original plan to symbolically imprison Lásek in a gilded cage in the middle of a accidentally discovered cellar under his own house turns into reality by a coincidence. However, the number of prisoners gradually increases. At first by chance, later because of Modráček's consideration for the previously imprisoned. The architect builds a stunning building complex for them in vast underground spaces, which he was not allowed to create above ground. He obtains funds from a treasure left underground by the expelled German inhabitants and also from the sale of parts of the cage, which turned out to be made of gold. With his obsession with the development of an absurd horizontal city, Modráček's madness also deepens. A community of people is created in the ideal house, who, more or less reconciled to their fate, learn to live together.

In the work, Kratochvil mixes detective techniques with surrealist visions, alternates the roles of narrators and constantly feeds the reader's attention through these effects. Perhaps to give the reader's imagination a better outlet, he allowed two endings to the story. The prisoners are released and meet a young couple having sex near the crime scene for decades, prompting reflections on the problem of guilt in the distant past. Or they die by accident and journalist Petr Luňák accidentally and symbolically approaches their lost grave in the underground and one of the story's protagonists, without being able to connect the events. Some elements of the novels have been labeled postmodern.
