= Bianca Bellová =

Czech writer

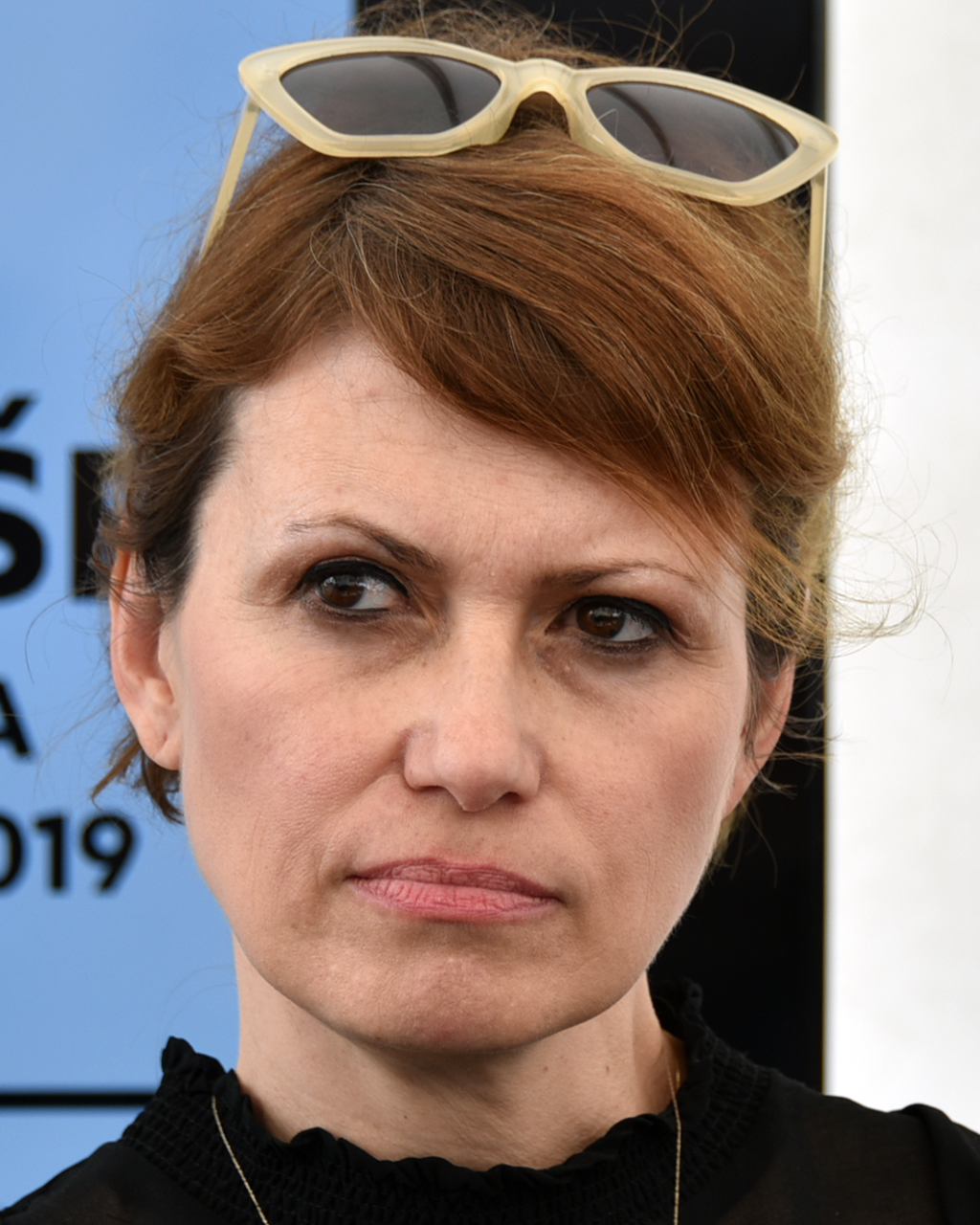
Bianca Bellová in 2019

Bianca Bellová (born 1970) is a Czech writer. She was born in Prague. She has written a number of books: Sentimentální román (Sentimental Novel, 2009), Mrtvý muž (Dead Man, 2011), Celý den se nic nestane (Nothing Happens All Day, 2013), Jezero (The Lake, 2016), Mona (2019) and Tyhle fragmenty (These Fragments, 2021). Jezero won the top Czech literary award Magnesia Litera and the EU Prize for Literature in 2016 and has been translated in numerous languages.
