= Petr Král =

Czech writer (1941–2020)

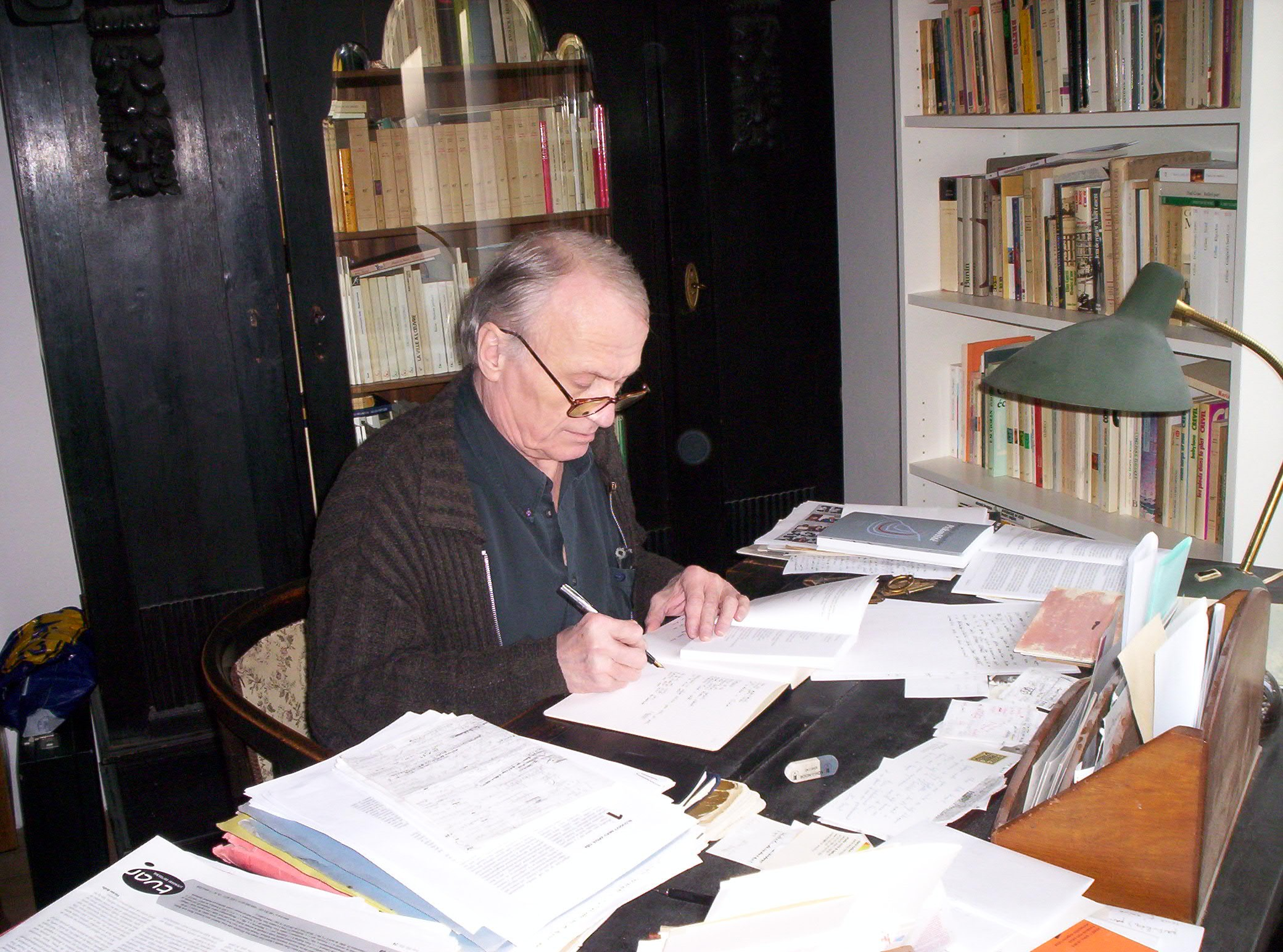
Petr Král in his study, 2008

Petr Král (4 September 1941 – 17 June 2020) was a Czech writer, initially influenced by surrealism.

Král was born in Prague. Having graduated from FAMU, he worked as an editor in the Orbis publishing house, where he focused on a line of books about film and filmmakers. In 1968, he immigrated to France where he worked in a gallery, a photo shop, as a teacher, interpreter, translator, screenplay author, reviewer and so on. In 1984 he lived in Québec. From 1990 to 1991 he was a cultural counsellor at the Czech embassy in Paris. He translated from and into French (mainly modern poetry). He edited several anthologies. Since April 2006, he resided in Prague.

== List of works ==
Petr Král started writing under the influence of surrealism, but from the 1970s, his books revealed that he felt a lack of fulfilment from the surrealist method. He wrote about eternal longing which is being nourished by itself, and perhaps leads to consuming the person who yearns. Král's emblematic words can be: "We don't die, it's much worse: we vanish. In other words, we never were. There is no reality."

- Vlasta Burian (with A. Král), 1969
- Prázdno světa, 1986
- Svědek stmívání, 1987
- Éra živých, 1989
- P. S. čili Cesty do ráje, 1990
- Právo na šedivou, 1991
- Pocit předsálí v aixské kavárně, 1991
- Med zatáček čili Dovětek k dějinám, 1992
- Voskovec a Werich čili Hvězdy klobouky, 1993
- Tyršovské přeháňky, 1994
- Fotografie v surrealismu, 1994
- Arsenál, 1994
- Soukromý život, 1996
- Pařížské sešity, 1996
- Mramor se jí studený (anthology of the Belgian Surrealist movement, as editor), 1996
- Staronový kontinent, 1997
- Chiméry a exil, 1998
- Groteska čili Morálka šlehačkového dortu, 1998
- Aimer Venise (Loving Venice), 1999
- Praha, 2000
- Pro anděla, 2000
- Základní pojmy, 2002
- Anthologie de la poésie tchèque contemporaine, 2002 (as editor, published in France by Gallimard)
- Bar Příroda čili Budoucnost 5 km, 2004
- Masiv a trhliny, 2004
- Přesuny, 2005
- Arco a jiné prózy, 2005
- Hm čili Míra omylu, 2006
- Úniky a návraty (interview with Petr Král by Radim Kopáč), 2006
- Notions de base, 2005 (Working Knowledge)
- Enquête sur des lieux, 2007 (In Search of the Essence of Place)
- Hum ou Marge d'erreur, 2007

== English translations ==
- Working Knowledge, translated by Frank Wynne, Pushkin Press, 2008
- Loving Venice, translated by Christopher Moncrieff, Pushkin Press, 2011
- In Search of the Essence of Place, translated by Christopher Moncrieff, Pushkin Press, 2012
