= Jiří Hájíček =

Czech writer (born 1967)

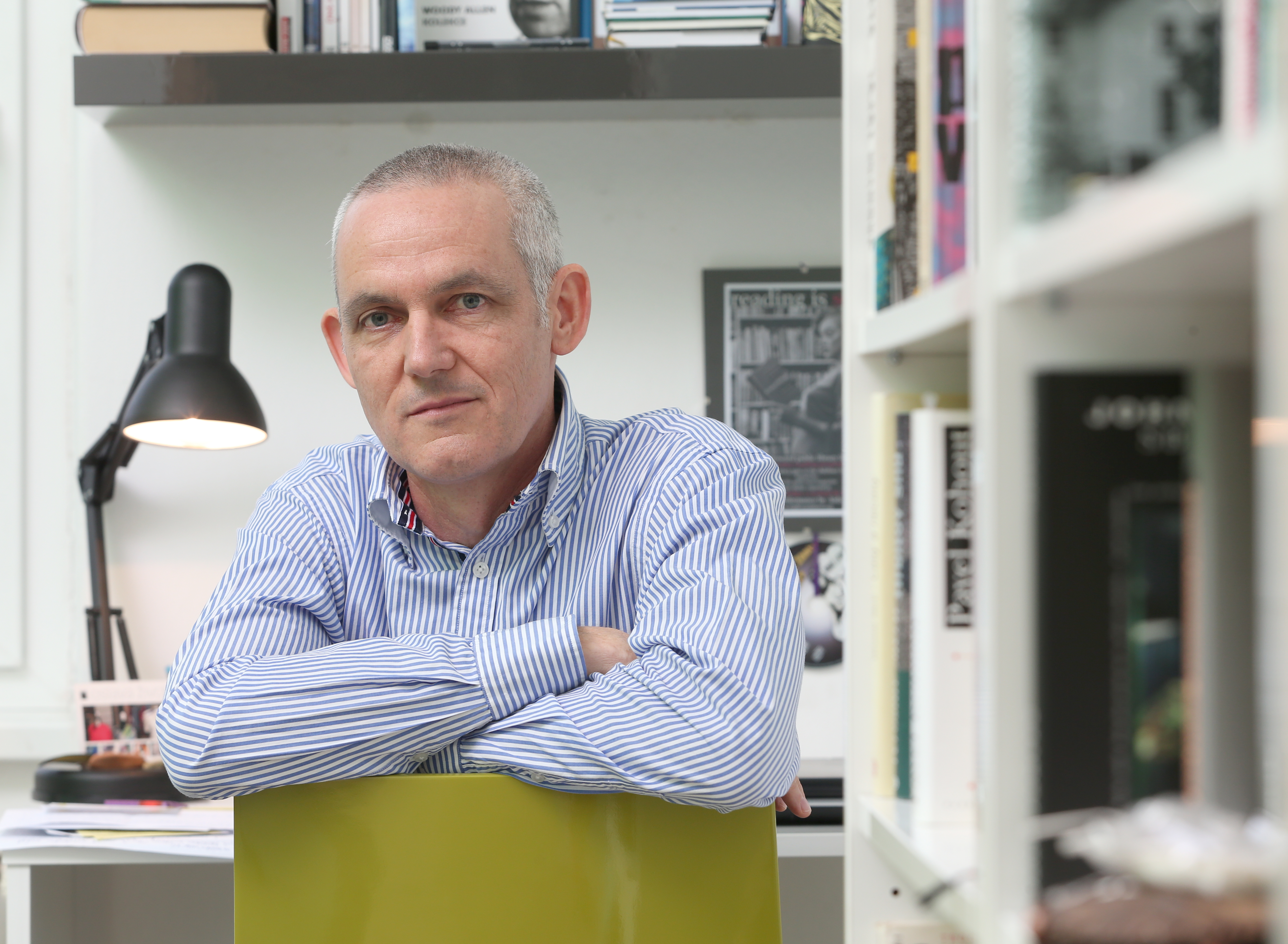
- Born: 11 September 1967 (age 58); České Budějovice, Czechoslovakia
- Education: University of South Bohemia
- Occupation: Writer
- Writing career
- Notable awards: Magnesia Litera (2006, 2013)
- Website: hajicek.info

Jiří Hájíček (born 11 September 1967 in České Budějovice) is a contemporary South Bohemian Czech writer. He started writing poetry in the 1980s in a youth poetry programme hosted by Mirek Kovářík. He won the 2006 Magnesia Litera prize for prose with his novel Selský baroko. In the European Society of Authors' 2013 Finnegan's List, Jaroslav Rudiš selected Hájíček's 2012 novel Rybí krev (Fish Blood) to be more widely translated into European languages. Rybí krev also won the Magnesia Litera Book of the Year for 2013. In 2016, his novel Zloději zelených koní was adapted into a film by Dan Wlodarczyk.

== Work ==
- Snídaně na refýži (The Breakfast on Safety Island), 1998 – collection of short stories
- Zloději zelených koní (The Green Horse Hustlers), 2001 – novel, published also in Hungarian in 2003. Filmed in 2016.
- Dobrodruzi hlavního proudu (The Mainstream Adventurers), 2002 – novel
- Dřevěný nůž (The Wooden Knife), 2004 – collection of short stories. Four of the stories are included in the English version of Rustic Baroque
- Selský baroko, 2005 – novel, published in English as Rustic Baroque in 2012 as well as in Hungarian, Italian and Bulgarian
- Fotbalové deníky (The Football Diaries), 2007 – novella
- Rybí krev (Fish Blood), 2012 – novel
- Dešťová hůl (The Rainstick), 2016 – novel
- Lvíčata (Lion Cubs), 2017 – short story published in Best European Fiction 2017
