= Magnesia Litera =

Czech literary award

Magnesia Litera is an annual book award held in the Czech Republic since 2002. The prize covers all literary genres in eight genre categories: prose, poetry, children's book (since 2004), non-fiction, essay/journalism (since 2007), translation, publishing achievement, book debut, and the main prize – one of the genre nominee is named the "Czech Book of the Year".

The prize is awarded by an independent association Litera which associates members of all Czech literary or book-market organizations: Academy of Sciences of the Czech Republic, Association of Booksellers and Publishers, Czech Centre of International PEN, Czech section of IBBY, Society of Czech Writers, Czech Translators' Guild.

== Books of the Year ==
- 2026 - Dora Kaprálová: Mariborská hypnóza
- 2025 – Miroslav Hlaučo: Letnice
- 2024 – Alena Machoninová: Hella
- 2023 – Miloš Doležal: Jana bude brzy sbírat lipový květ
- 2022 – Pavel Klusák: Gott: Československý příběh (Gott: Czechoslovak Story) (non-fiction)
- 2021 – Martin Hilský: Shakespearova Anglie (Shakespeare's England) (non-fiction)
- 2020 – Petr Čornej: Jan Žižka: život a doba husitského válečníka (Jan Žižka: The Life and Times of a Hussite Warrior) (non-fiction)
- 2019 – Radka Denemarková: Hodiny z olova
- 2018 – Erik Tabery: Opuštěná společnost. Česká cesta od Masaryka po Babiše (Abandoned Society: The Czech Journey from Masaryk to Babiš) (non-fiction)
- 2017 – Bianca Bellová: Jezero
- 2016 – Daniela Hodrová: Točité věty
- 2015 – Martin Reiner: Básník. Román o Ivanu Blatném
- 2014 – Jiří Padevět: Průvodce protektorátní Prahou (Guide to the Protectorate Prague) (non-fiction)
- 2013 – Jiří Hájíček: Rybí krev (Fish Blood)
- 2012 – Michal Ajvaz: Lucemburská zahrada (Luxembourg Garden)
- 2011 – Jan Balabán: Zeptej se táty (Ask Dad)
- 2010 – Petra Soukupová: Zmizet (To Disappear)
- 2009 – Bohumila Grögerová: Rukopis (The Manuscript)
- 2008 – Petr Nikl: Záhádky
- 2007 – Petru Cimpoeșu: Simion Liftnicul (translated from Romanian by Jiří Našinec)
- 2006 – Jan Reich: Bohemia
- 2005 – Jan Novák: Zatím dobrý (So Far So Good)
- 2004 – Jiří Suk: Labyrintem revoluce (Through the Labyrinth of Velvet Revolution) (non-fiction)
- 2003 – Pavel Zatloukal: Příběhy z dlouhého století – Architektura let 1750–1918 na Moravě a ve Slezsku (Stories from the Long Century: Moravian and Silesian Architecture 1790–1918) (non-fiction)
- 2002 – Jürgen Serke: Böhmische Dörfer (publishing achievement by Triada Publishing)

== See also ==
- List of Czech literary awards
