= List of Czech women writers =

This is a list of women writers who were born in the Czech Republic or Czechoslovakia or whose writings are closely associated with those countries.

== A ==
- Madeleine Albright (1937–2022), American politician, non-fiction writer, autobiographer, writing in English
- Hana Andronikova (1967–2011), novelist, short story writer

== B ==
- Božena Benešová (1873–1936), Czech poet, novelist, short story writer, playwright
- Alexandra Berková (1949–2008), novelist, short story writer, some works translated into English
- Zdeňka Bezděková (1907–1999), writer, philosopher and translator
- Anna Bolavá, (born 1981), novelist, poet
- Tereza Boučková (born 1957), short story writer, playwright
- Zuzana Brabcová (1959–2015), novelist

== C ==
- Marie Červinková-Riegrová (1854–1895), biographer, autobiographer, librettist
- Zuzana Černínová z Harasova (1600–1654), letter writer

== D ==
- Radka Denemarková (born 1968), novelist, biographer
- Dominika Dery (born 1975), poet, prose writer, memoirist, author of The Twelve Little Cakes

== E ==
- Helen Epstein (born 1947 in Prague), biographer, memoirist, essayist, author of Children of the Holocaust

== H ==
- Jiřina Hauková (1919–2005), poet, translator
- Eva Hauserová (1954–2023), novelist, non-fiction writer, feminist
- Iva Hercíková (1935–2007), novelist, screenwriter
- Daniela Hodrová (1946–2024), novelist, editor, literary researcher
- Eva Hudečková (born 1949), novelist, screenwriter
- Petra Hůlová (born 1979), popular novelist

== J ==
- Jožka Jabůrková (1896–1942), journalist, non-fiction writer, translator
- Milena Jesenská (1896–1944), journalist, columnist, editor, translator

== K ==
- Eva Kantůrková (born 1930), novelist, short story writer, essayist, diarist
- Jakuba Katalpa (born 1979), novelist, short story writer
- Věra Kohnová (1929–1942), child diarist, author of The Diary of Vera Kohnova
- Eliška Krásnohorská (1847–1926), poet, librettist, children's writer, critic, feminist

== L ==
- Květa Legátová (1919–2012), novelist, short story writer, essayist
- Věra Linhartová (born 1938), art historian, short story writer, children's writer, poet, sometimes writing in French
- Helena Lisická (1930–2009), writer of fairy tales and legends
- Lucie Lomová (born 1964), comics writer
- Jarmila Loukotková (1923–2007), historical novelist, short story writer, children's writer, playwright

== M ==
- Marie Majerová (1882–1967), novelist, short story writer, children's writer
- Heda Margolius Kovály (1919–2010), memoirist, novelist, some works translated into English
- Libuše Moníková (1945–1998), novelist, playwright, essayist, writing in German

== N ==
- Božena Němcová (1820–1862), acclaimed novelist, writer of folk tales, author of The Grandmother (Czech: Babička)
- Bára Nesvadbová (born 1975), novelist, columnist, children's writer

== P ==
- Halina Pawlowská (born 1955), screenwriter, short story writer, journalist, television presenter
- Iva Pekárková (born 1963 in Prague), Czech-language novelist, now living in New York
- Gabriela Preissová (1862–1946), playwright, short story writer
- Lenka Procházková (born 1951), novelist, television screenwriter
- Marie Pujmanová (1893–1958) Czech poet and novelist

== R ==
- Magdalena Dobromila Rettigová (1785–1845), remembered for her cookery book
- Sylvie Richterová (born 1945), short story writer, poet, essayist, educator
- Lenka Reinerová (1916–2008), German-language non-fiction writer, journalist, editor, memoirist, essayist

== S ==
- Zdena Salivarová (1933–2025), novelist, lived in Canada
- Milada Součková (1898–1983), writer, literary historian, diplomat
- Petra Soukupová (born 1982), author, playwright, screenwriter
- Marie Šťastná (born 1981), poet
- Ela Stein-Weissberger (1930–2018), biographer
- Bertha von Suttner (1843–1914), born in Prague, Austrian pacifist, novelist, Nobel Peace Prize winner
- Eva Švankmajerová (1940–2005), surrealist artist, writer, poet
- Karolina Světlá (1830–1899), novelist, feminist

== T ==
- Jindra Tichá (born 1937), academic, short story writer, living in New Zealand
- Kateřina Tučková (born 1980), best-selling novelist (works translated into English), non-fiction writer

== U ==
- Eli Urbanová (1922–2012), Esperantist, novelist, poet

== V ==
- Fan Vavřincová (1917–2012), screenwriter, novelist, short story writer
- Božena Viková-Kunětická (1862–1934), novelist, short story writer, politician

== W ==
- Alena Wagnerová (born 1936), journalist, biographer
- Magdalena Wagnerová (born 1960), short story writer, screenwriter

== Z ==
- Markéta Zinnerová (born 1942), novelist, screenwriter, children's writer
- Anna Zonová (born 1962), novelist, short story writer

== See also ==
- List of Czech writers
- List of women writers
