= Hejda =

Hejda (feminine Hejdová) is a Czech surname. Notable people with the surname include:

- Jan Hejda, Czech ice hockey player
- Lukáš Hejda, Czech footballer
- Romana Hejdová, Czech basketball player
- Zbyněk Hejda, Czech poet
- Zuzana Hejdová, Czech tennis player
