= Černošice =

- Town
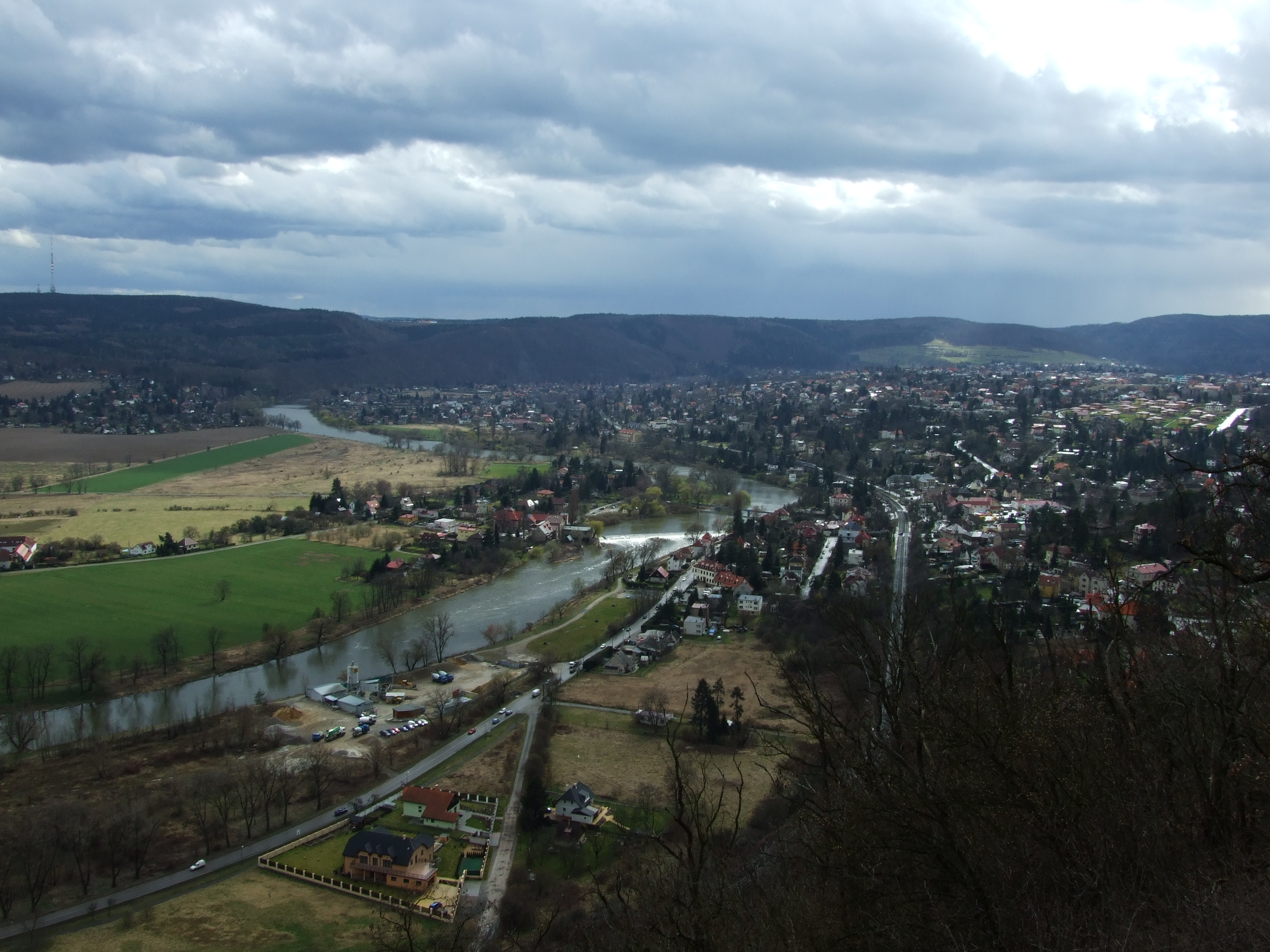
- Černošice seen from a hill

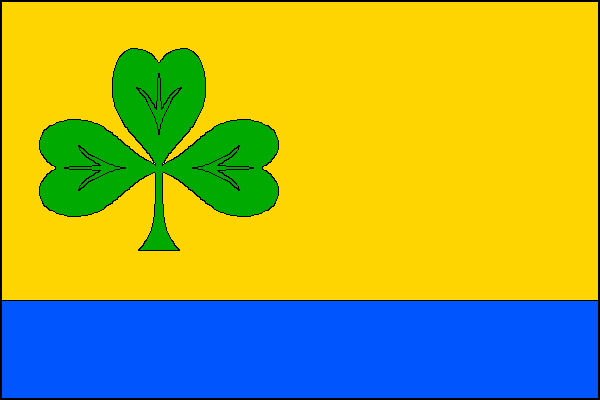
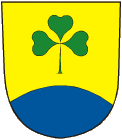
- Flag Coat of arms

- Location in the Czech Republic
- Coordinates: 49°57′11″N 14°19′31″E
- Country: Czech Republic
- Region: Central Bohemian
- District: Prague-West
- First mentioned: 1088

Government
  - Mayor: Filip Kořínek

Area
  - Total: 9.06 km^{2} (3.50 sq mi)
- Elevation: 211 m (692 ft)

Population (2026-01-01)
  - Total: 7,781
  - Density: 859/km^{2} (2,220/sq mi)
- Time zone: UTC+1 (CET)
  - Summer (DST): UTC+2 (CEST)
- Postal code: 252 28
- Website: www.mestocernosice.cz

Černošice (Czech pronunciation: [ˈtʃɛrnoʃɪtsɛ]) is a town in Prague-West District in the Central Bohemian Region of the Czech Republic. It has about 7,800 inhabitants. The town is located on the Berounka River, near the city of Prague.

Until the 19th century, there were several agricultural villages in the area of Černošice, but they gradually merged and in 1969 Černošice became a town.

== Etymology ==
The name is derived from the personal name Černoch, meaning "the village of Černoch's people". From the beginning of the 14th century, two separate villages were distinguished: Horní ('upper') Černošice and Dolní ('lower') Černošice.

== Geography ==
Černošice is located about 5 kilometres (3 mi) southwest of Prague. It lies mostly in the Hořovice Uplands, only the northwestern part of the municipal territory extends into the Prague Plateau. The highest point is the hill Babka at 364 m (1,194 ft) above sea level. The town is situated on the left bank of the Berounka River.

== History ==
Bluk mill near Černošice, between 1900 and 1909

The present-day town is made up of three historical parts: Horní Černošice (originally just Černošice), Dolní Mokropsy and Vráž. The village of Dolní Mokropsy was first mentioned in 1088 and Horní Černošice in 1115. In Horní Černošice stood the Church of the Assumption of the Virgin Mary (first mentioned in 1352), when it served as a parish church. A few farms stood around this church. The villages was located at two important trade routes – the route from Prague to Bechyně and from Prague to the Karlštejn Castle. With a break between 1422 and 1455, Černošice was owned by the Zbraslav Monastery from 1292 until the abolition of the monastery in 1785.

Černošice was heavily damaged during the Thirty Years' War in 1639, when it was burned to the ground by the Swedish army moving towards Prague. During the war, there was a great decline in population because of the war losses, epidemics and emigration.

From 1785 to 1825, the Zbraslav estate was administered by a religious fund. In 1825, Count Friedrich Oettingen-Wallerstein bought the estate. The last owner of the estate was Cyril Bartoň of Dobenín, who bought it in 1910.

In 1862, the railway stations in Černošice were opened as a part of the new-built railway from Prague to Plzeň. The new railway brought a tourist and building boom. Lidos were founded along the river and many new villas were built. Černošice became one of the most famous residential and weekend-cottage satellites. During this time, Černošice started to lose its agricultural character. The development of the town was stopped during the World Wars.

In 1864, Horní Černošice and Dolní Černošice merged into one municipality. In 1920–1950, Horní Černošice and Dolní Černošice were two separate municipalities. In 1950, Horní Černošice, Dolní Černošice and Dolní Mokropsy were joined and named Černošice. In 1974, Dolní Černošice disconnected and became part of Prague-Lipence. In 1969, Černošice was promoted to a town.

== Demographics ==
Historical population

Year	Pop.	±%
1869	616	—
1880	598	−2.9%
1890	599	+0.2%
1900	674	+12.5%
1910	1,010	+49.9%

Year	Pop.	±%
1921	1,430	+41.6%
1930	2,809	+96.4%
1950	4,188	+49.1%
1961	4,762	+13.7%
1970	4,608	−3.2%

Year	Pop.	±%
1980	4,537	−1.5%
1991	4,351	−4.1%
2001	4,631	+6.4%
2011	6,849	+47.9%
2021	7,707	+12.5%

Source: Censuses

== Transport ==
Černošice is located on the railway line Prague–Beroun. There are two train stations: Černošice and Černošice-Mokropsy.

== Sights ==
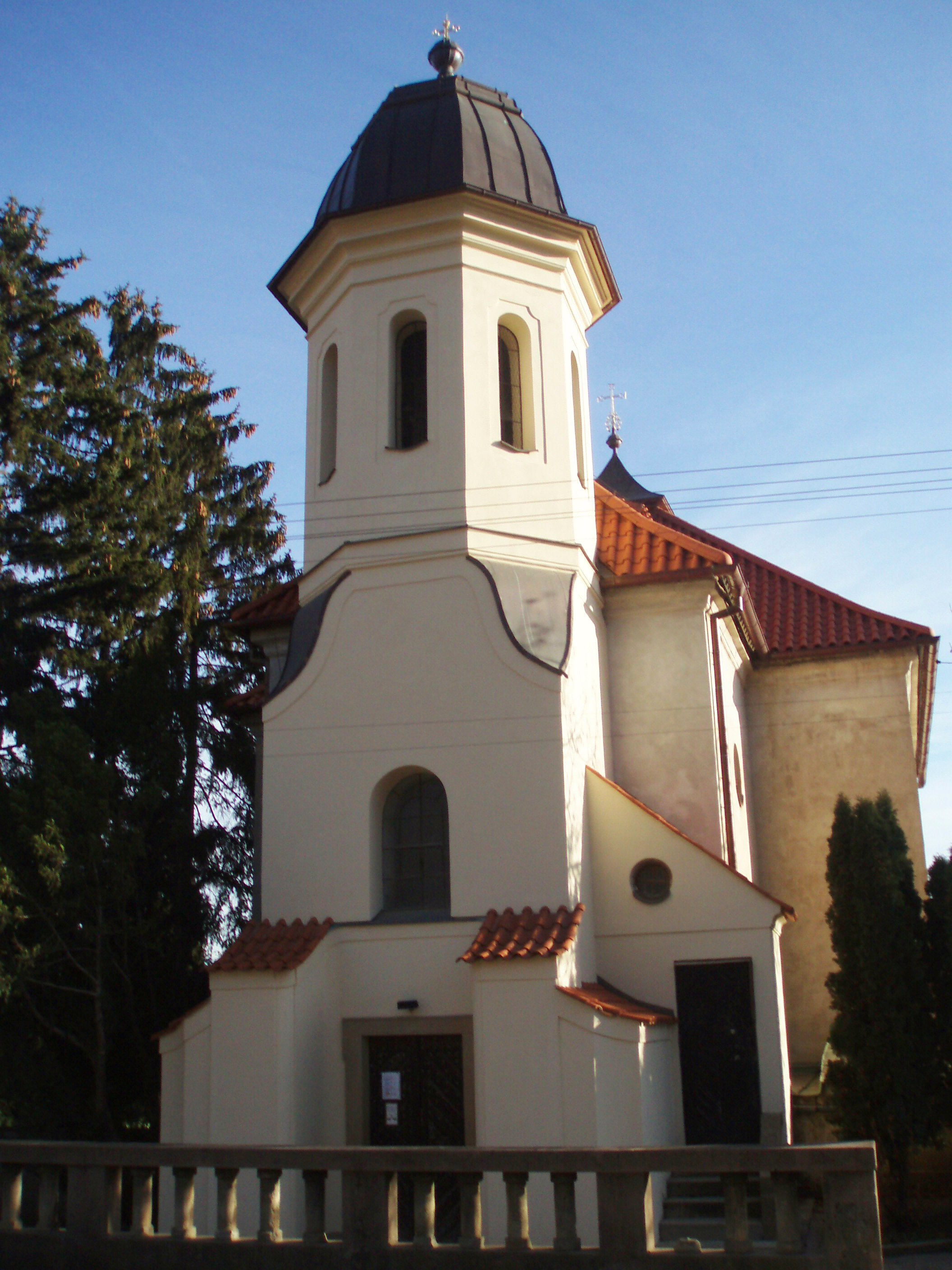
Church of the Assumption of the Virgin Mary

The main landmark of Černošice is the Church of the Assumption of the Virgin Mary. It was first mentioned in the 14th century and is the oldest preserved building in the town. It was rebuilt in the Baroque style at the beginning of the 18th century. It has a Baroque altar from 1713.

== In popular culture ==
The English book The Twelve Little Cakes by Dominka Dery was written about the life of a dissident family during the Communist times in Černošice.

== Notable people ==
- Jan Janský (1873–1921), serologist and neurologist; lived and died here
- Břetislav Bartoš (1893–1926), painter; died here
- Jaroslav Bouček (1912–1987), footballer
- Vladimír Kobranov (1927–2015), ice hockey player
- Dominika Dery (born 1975), journalist and writer

== Twin towns – sister cities ==
Černošice is twinned with:

- Gerbrunn, Germany
- Leśnica, Poland
- Themar, Germany
