= Adam Georgiev =

Czech poet and author of prose (born 1980)

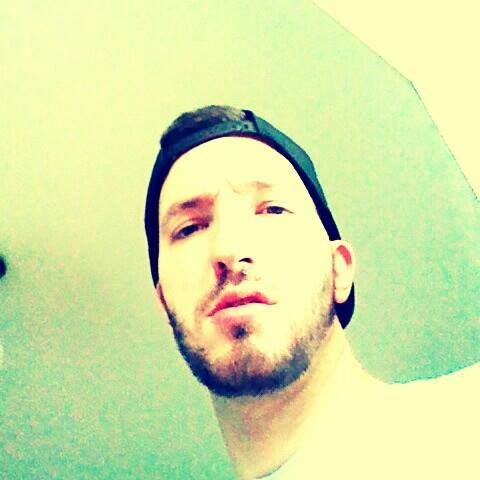
- Adam Georgiev (2014)
- Born: 4 July 1980 (age 46); Prague, Czechoslovakia
- Occupations: Novelist, poet
- Writing career
- Genres: Postmodern prose, LGBT prose, Dirty realism, Social-critical prose, Metaphysical poetry
- Website: www.facebook.com/AdamGeorgiev

Adam Georgiev (born 4 July 1980) is a Czech poet and author of prose. He is most known as an author of gay literature.

== Career ==
Georgiev received two nominations for the Book of the Year 2007 from a professional poll conducted by Czech newspaper Lidové noviny, for his book Básník Trýzeň Kat (Poet Torment Executioner), a collection of verses from 1997 to 2007. One of the nominations from the poll was from Eva Kantůrková, the president of the Academy of Czech Literature, who praised "the defiant nature of the text, which resists not only the popular but also the literary mood of our day and age content with banality". The other nomination was from Polish journalist Mariusz Szczygieł, who compared the "metaphysics and spirituality" of the book to Ladislav Klíma. Literary theoretician Alexej Mikulášek described the book as "one of best to come out of Czech literature this past year".

Georgiev then released three books of prose, known as the "gay trilogy": Planeta samých chlapců (Christ Is Dancing) (2008), Bulvár slunce (Boulevard of the Sun) (2009) and Zabij mě, Eliso (Kill Me, Elisa) (2009). The books are characterized by their openness towards homosexuality. A review in literary journal Literární noviny described Georgiev's writing as depicting the trauma of gay society. Excerpts from Boulevard of the Sun are included in the Czech anthologies, Kniha o čuráku (Book About a Dick) and Kniha o mrdání (Book About Screwing) (both published in 2009).

Georgiev's next work was in the form of fictitious letters from Paul Verlaine to Arthur Rimbaud, in the book Arthure, ty děvko umění (Arthur, You Whore of Art) (2010). Director Agnieszka Holland wrote the foreword to the book, which was described by Právo as "a testimony of bodily passion and literary creation". This was followed by a dark and controversial novel about evil in the name of love, Třepetavý zvuk ptačích křídel (Fluttering Sounds of Birds Wings) (2011), which deals with the relationship between a soldier and a young boy. Georgiev described these two texts as "literary minimalism".

Georgiev has also been published in Poland, by Krytyka Polityczna. A dissertation was written about Georgiev's work at Jagiellonian University, Kraków, in 2010. Some of Georgiev's works have also been translated into Bulgarian and Dutch. In 2013, the first translation into English was made, of Planeta samých chlapců (Christ Is Dancing).

Georgiev has been compared to a number of other authors, including Milan Kundera and Frédéric Beigbeder. Polish newspaper Dziennik Gazeta Prawna wrote that Christ Is Dancing is "as if Almodóvar wrote We Children from Bahnhof Zoo".

In 2010 he was reported by Czech Television to be the highest-selling gay author in the country. In 2012, Czech media reported that Agnieszka Holland had backed out of her original intention to christen Georgiev's social-critical prose Večeře u spisovatelky (Dinner with the Authoress). The book tells the story of a relationship between a younger male author and an older female author.

== Bibliography ==
- Poet Torment Executioner (Czech: Básník Trýzeň Kat), Prague 2007
- Boys-Only Planet (Czech: Planeta samých chlapců), Prague 2008; foreword by Eva Kantůrková
- Holy Communion of Hell (Czech: Hostie pekla), Prague 2008
- Boulevard of the Sun (Czech: Bulvár slunce), Prague 2009
- Kill me, Elisa (Czech: Zabij mě, Eliso), Prague 2009
- Arthur, You Whore of Art (Czech: Arthure, ty děvko umění), Prague 2010; foreword by Agnieszka Holland
- Planeta samych chlopców, Warsaw 2010; Polish translation of Boys-Only Planet
- Fluttering Sounds of Birds Wings (Czech: Třepetavý zvuk ptačích křídel), Prague 2011
- In the Name of (Czech: Ve jménu), Prague 2011
- Homogolgota, Plovdiv 2011; Bulgarian translation of Boys-Only Planet
- Dinner with the Authoress (Czech: Večeře u spisovatelky), Prague 2012
- Christ Is Dancing, e-book 2014; English translation of Boys-Only Planet
- Sanktvejtsdans, Copenhagen 2016; Danish translation of Boys-Only Planet

=== Anthologies ===
- Book About a Dick (Kniha o čuráku), Prague 2009
- Book About Screwing (Kniha o mrdání), Prague 2009
