= Pekárek =

Pekárek or Pekarek (feminine: Pekárková) is a surname. Notable people with the surname include:

- Iva Pekárková, Czech-American writer
- Josef Pekarek (1913–1991), Austrian-German footballer
- Justin Pekarek, American former competitive ice dancer.
- Neyla Pekarek, American cellist, vocalist, and pianist
- Rudolf Pekárek, Czech-Australian conductor

== Fictional characters ==
- Standa Pekárek from Volha (TV series), Czech TV

== See also ==
- Peter Pekarík
