= Funeral Ceremonies =

- Directed by: Zdenek Sirový
- Written by: Eva Kantůrková; Zdenek Sirový
- Based on: Smuteční slavnost by Eva Kantůrková
- Starring: Jaroslava Tichá; Ľudovít Kroner; Josef Somr
- Cinematography: Jiří Macháně
- Edited by: Jan Chaloupek
- Music by: Jiří Kalach
- Production company: Barrandov Studios
- Distributed by: Ústřední půjčovna filmů
- Release date: June 1, 1990
- Running time: 68 minutes
- Country: Czechoslovakia
- Language: Czech

Funeral Ceremonies (Czech: Smuteční slavnost) is a Czech drama film directed by Zdenek Sirový based on a novel by Eva Kantůrková. The film was banned after its completion in 1969 and wasn't released until 1990.

== Plot ==
In winter 1965 recently widowed Matylda Chladilová wants to have her husband buried at the cemetery in his birthplace. To achieve that she needs a permission from the Local committee of the Communist Party, which is headed by an old enemy of her husband Alois Devera. The Chladils were forced to leave their home after an incident that happened in 1951. During the collectivization a Communist Party official Januš forced private farmers in the village to give up their farms for collective farming. Chladil drove Januš away with a rifle and shot at him as he was fleeing. As a result, Chladil's farm was confiscated and the Chladils had to leave to another village to live in poverty. Chladil's funeral is attended by his former neighbours and turns into a silent demonstration against the communist regime.

== Cast ==
- Jaroslava Tichá as Matylda Chladilová
- Ľudovít Kroner as Jan Chladil
- Josef Somr as Chairman of Local committee Alois Devera
- Jana Vychodilová as Tonka, Devera's wife
- Ludmila Roubíková as Chrudimská, Tonka's mother
- Jan Kühnmund as Chrudimský, Tonka's father
- Gustav Opočenský as Secretary of Local committee Januš
- Božena Böhmová as Anna, Januš's wife
- Josef Bartůněk as Member of parliament

== Production ==
The screenplay was based on the 1967 novel of the same name by Eva Kantůrková. She drew inspiration from the events she witnessed as a teenager. Majority of the movie was shot in Pelhřimov and its neighbouring villages Putimov and Nový Rychnov. After the completion on 24 September 1969 the film was banned and Sirový's directing career was sidelined. During the Normalization he was only allowed to direct pro-regime movies.

== Release ==
The first public screening happened at the Faculty of Philosophy of Charles University in Prague during the Velvet Revolution on 16 November 1989. After the fall of Communism the film could be finally shown in theatres. The premiere was on 1 June 1990. Later that year the movie was screened at the film festivals in Karlovy Vary, Bratislava or Montreal.

=== Home media ===
The film was released on VHS by Bonton on March 1, 2003. The same company released the DVD on July 8, 2009.

== Reception ==
Funeral Ceremonies received positive reviews by critics in the Czech Republic. Jaroslav Sedláček called it "one of the great Czech movies of the late 1960s". It won FIPRESCI Award at 1990 Karlovy Vary International Film Festival and Special Jury Prize at 1990 Montreal World Film Festival.

== See also ==
- List of banned films
