= Stanislav Komárek =

Czech biologist, philosopher and writer

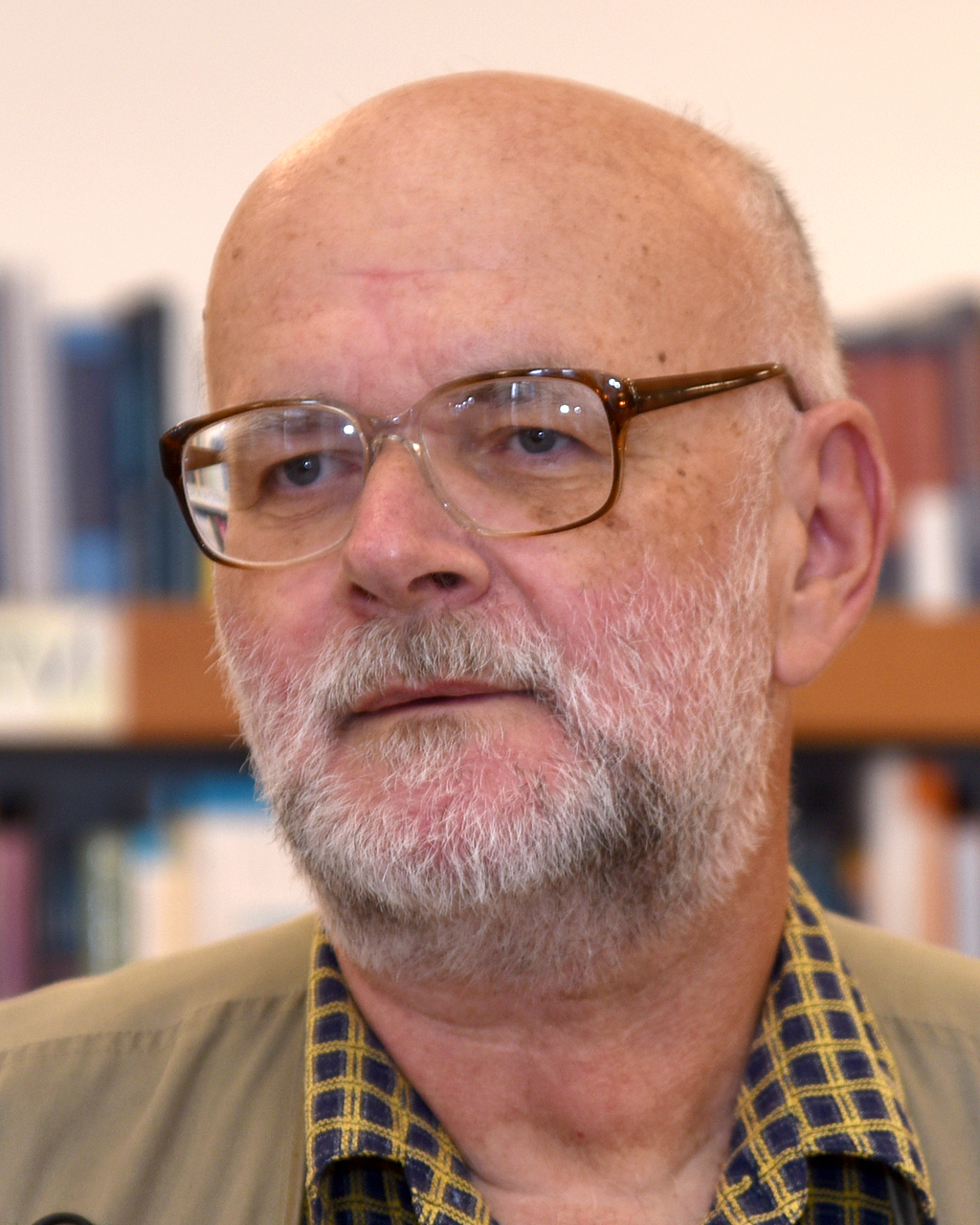
Stanislav Komárek in 2023

Stanislav Komárek (born 6 August 1958) is a Czech biologist, philosopher and writer; author of original essays, poet and novelist, ethologist, anthropologist, historian of biology and university teacher. He deals mainly with the history of biology, the relationship between nature and culture, human ethology, biological aesthetics, the work of Adolf Portmann and Carl Jung.

== Life ==
Stanislav Komárek was born on 6 August 1958 in Jindřichův Hradec, but he comes from Kardašova Řečice. He attended the Gymnasium in Jindřichův Hradec, where he graduated in 1977. He continued his studies at the Faculty of Natural Sciences of the Charles University in Prague, where he received the degree of RNDr. He was a candidate at the Institute of Parasitology of the Czechoslovak Academy of Sciences.

In 1983, he immigrated to Austria, where he worked at the Natural History Museum in Vienna, at the Ministry of Agriculture and at the Zoological Institute of the University of Vienna. During his stay in Vienna, he also worked together with the so-called Altenber circle for the philosophy and history of natural sciences. At the same time, he devoted himself to the intensive study of the German autonomist school in biology and similar topics in ethology and anthropology (especially the study of the works of Adolf Portmann, Konrad Lorenz, Jakob Uexküll and others). As part of this study, he was an assistant at the Department of Theoretical Biology of the Zoological Institute in the University of Vienna and the Konrad Lorenz Institute in Altenberg.

Between the years 1990–2024 he worked at the Department of Philosophy and History of Natural Sciences, Faculty of Sciences, Charles University in Prague.In October 1990, he began lecturing here on the interrelationships of natural and cultural phenomena and Adolf Portmann's biological aesthetics.

He further developed the phenomenon of mimicry and mimeticism in later years and it became a central object of his interest.

In 1993, he completed a six-month internship in the Netherlands at the University of Leiden, which was associated with the study of the extensive book collections there, work on the bibliography of mimetic phenomena, and at the same time lecturing. In the years 1996–2002, he worked as the head of the Department of Philosophy and History of Natural Sciences of the Faculty of Science at Charles University. He also teaches externally at the Institute of Philosophy and Religious studies, Faculty of Arts, Charles University. In the years 2003–2011, he worked at the Department of General Anthropology, Faculty of Humanities, Charles University. In 1994, he completed his habilitation in the field of entomology. The title of Dr. obtained in 1997 at the Faculty of Education of the same university in the field of philosophy of education. In 2001, he was appointed professor of philosophy and history of natural sciences at the Faculty of Natural Sciences of Charles University.

== Media work ==
Stanislav Komárek also contributes numerous essays to periodicals (eg Tvar, Vesmír, Prostor, Analogon, Přítomnost and others). His journalistic novels tend to be evaluated very oppositely by literary critics. Some critics compare him to Jan Křesadlo for his prose.

In 2006, he won the Tom Stoppard Prize for his essays.
