= Tom Stoppard Prize =

Annual literary award

The Tom Stoppard Prize (Czech: Cena Toma Stopparda) is a literary award given annually for outstanding primarily non-fiction work by a writer of Czech origin. It was established in 1983 and first awarded in 1984, to Eva Kantůrková for My Companions in the Bleak House. The award is named for and funded by the Czech-born British playwright Tom Stoppard. In recent years, the award has been made at the Mayor's residence in Prague. The award was organised by the Charter 77 Foundation until 2017; since 2021 it has been awarded by the Václav Havel Library.

== Recipients ==
Year (Note: This is the year the award was made, typically honoring work from the previous year. Elsewhere, the award for, say, 1999 may be referred to as the 1998 Tom Stoppard Prize.)	Recipient	Work	Notes
1984	Eva Kantůrková	Přítelkyně z domu smutku ("My Companions in the Bleak House")	
1984	Zdeněk Urbánek	Popaměti ("Memoirs")	
1985	Ivan Martin Jirous	Magorovy labutí písně ("Magor's Swan Songs")	
1985	Milan Jungmann	Cesty a rozcestí ("Roads and Crossroads")	(Note: Samizdat version. Later published in 1989.)
1986	Bohumila Grögerová and Josef Hiršal	Let let ("The Flight of Years")	
1987	Milan Uhde	Pán plamínků	
1988	Jáchym Topol	Miluju tě k zbláznění ("I Love You Madly")	
1989	Zbyněk Hejda	Blízkosti smrti	
1990	No award		(Note: 1989 was the year of the Velvet Revolution)
1991	Jiří Kratochvil	Medvědí román ("A Bear's Novel")	
1992	No award		(Note: The Dissolution of Czechoslovakia took effect on 1 January 1993)
1993	Jan Lopatka	Předpoklady tvorby and Radiojournál v ko(s)mickém věku	
1994	Jiří Olič	Čtení o Jakubu Demlovi	
1995	Jiří Kovtun	Tajuplná vražda. Případ Leopolda Hilsnera	
1996	Sergej Machonin	Příběh se závorkami. Alternativy	
1997	Jolana Poláková	Perspektiva naděje	
1998	Jiří Pechar	For literary criticism and translation	
1999	Jana Červenková	Kurs potápění	
2000	Karel Kosík	Předpotopní úvahy	
2001	Pavel Kosatík	Ferdinand Peroutka, Pozdější život (1938 - 1978)	
2002	Jiří Opelík	Milované řemeslo	
2003	Martin Hilský	Translation of and essays about William Shakespeare	
2004	Václav Jamek	Duch v plné práci ("A Spirit Hard at Work")	
2005	Václav Cílek	Makom, kniha míst ("Makom: A Book of Places") and Krajiny vnitřní a vnější ("Inner and Outer Landscapes")	
2006	Stanislav Komárek	Leprosárium ("The Leper Colony")	
2007	Přemysl Rut	Pan Když a slečna Kdyby	
2008	Zdeněk Neubauer	O počátku, cestě a znamení časů	
2009	Lubomír Martínek	Mýtus o Lynkeovi ("The Myth of Lynke")	
2009	Erik Tabery	Vládneme, nerušit	
2010	Petr Rezek	Architektonika a protoarchitektura ("Architecture and Protarchitecture")	
2011	Věra Linhartová	Soustředné kruhy ("Concentric Circles")	
2012	Martin C. Putna	Václav Havel: duchovní portrét v rámu české kultury 20. století ("Václav Havel: A spiritual portrait within the framework of 20th century Czech culture")	
2013	Jan Vladislav	Otevřený deník	
2014	Patrik Ouředník	Svobodný prostor jazyka ("On the Free Exercise of Language")	
2015	A. J. Liehm	Názory tak řečeného Dalimila	
2016	Petr Holman	Březiniana II (about Otokar Březina)	
2017	Sylvie Richterová	Eseje o české literatuře ("Essays on Czech Literature")	
2018	No award		
2019	No award		
2020	No award		
2021	Josefina Fromanová	Kde končím a kde začínám a proč je dobré to vědět ("Where I end and where I start and why it is good to know")	
2022	No award		
2023	Marie Iljašenko	Jsem všudezdejší	
2024	Vladimír Merta	Mrazivá mystika války ("The Chilling Mystique of War")	
2025	Stanislav Šulc	Obchodní podmínky. Svět, ve kterém se z občanů stali uživatelé ("Terms and Conditions. A World in Which Citizens Have Become Users")	

== See also ==
- List of Czech literary awards
- Samizdat
