= Josef Rauvolf =

Czech translator and writer (born 1953)

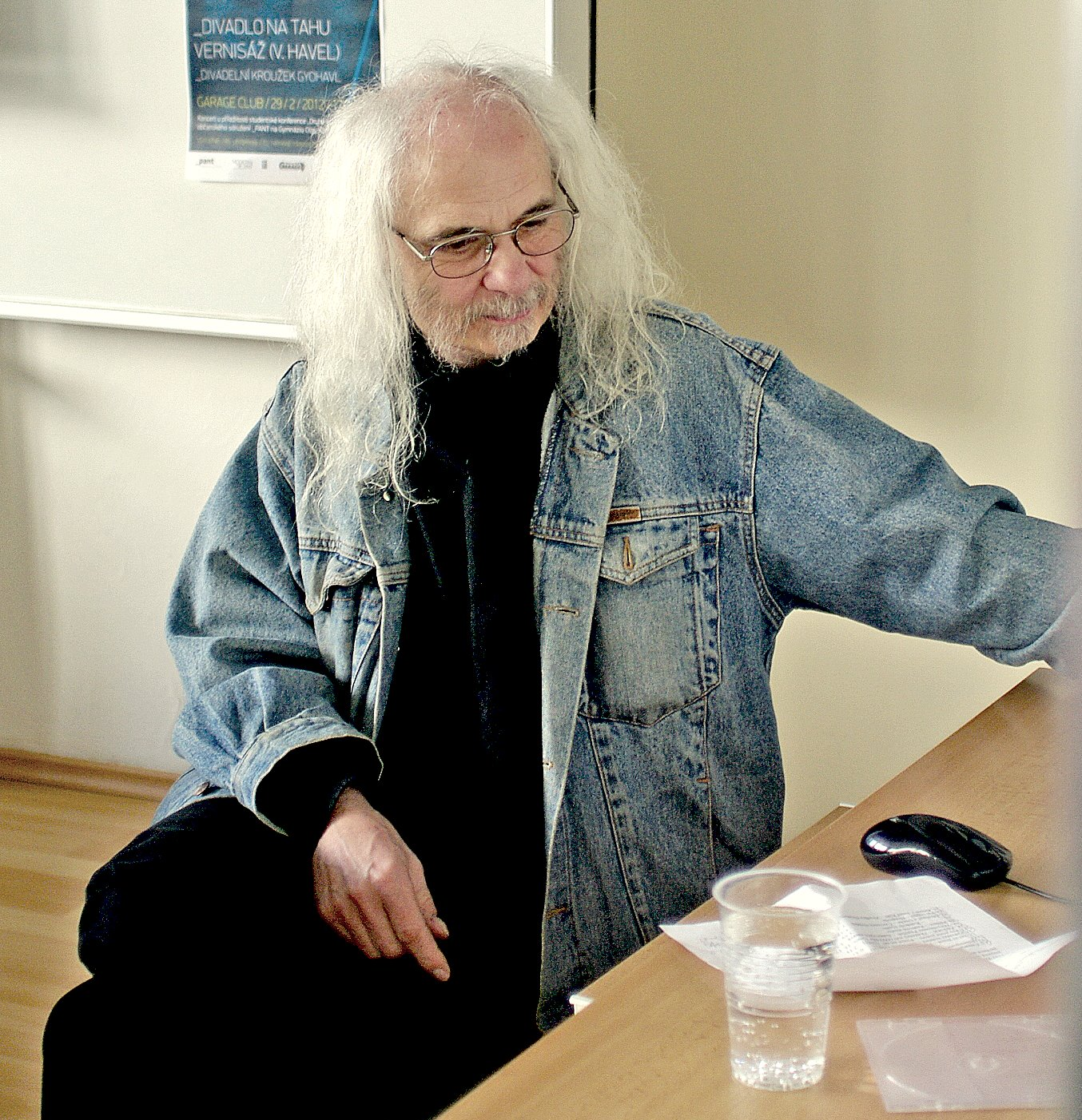
- Josef Rauvolf (2012)
- Born: January 2, 1953 (age 72); Cheb, Czech Republic

Josef Rauvolf (born 2 January 1953) is a Czech translator, journalist and writer from Cheb. He has translated many Beat Generation novels into Czech, such as Junkie, Naked Lunch and Queer by William S. Burroughs and Visions of Cody, The Dharma Bums and Good Blonde & Others by Jack Kerouac. He also translated Uptight about The Velvet Underground. He was awarded the Josef Jungmann Award for his translation of Visions of Cody. In addition to his translation work, he also wrote a book about Czech singer-songwriter Jaromír Nohavica.
