= Marie Iljašenko =

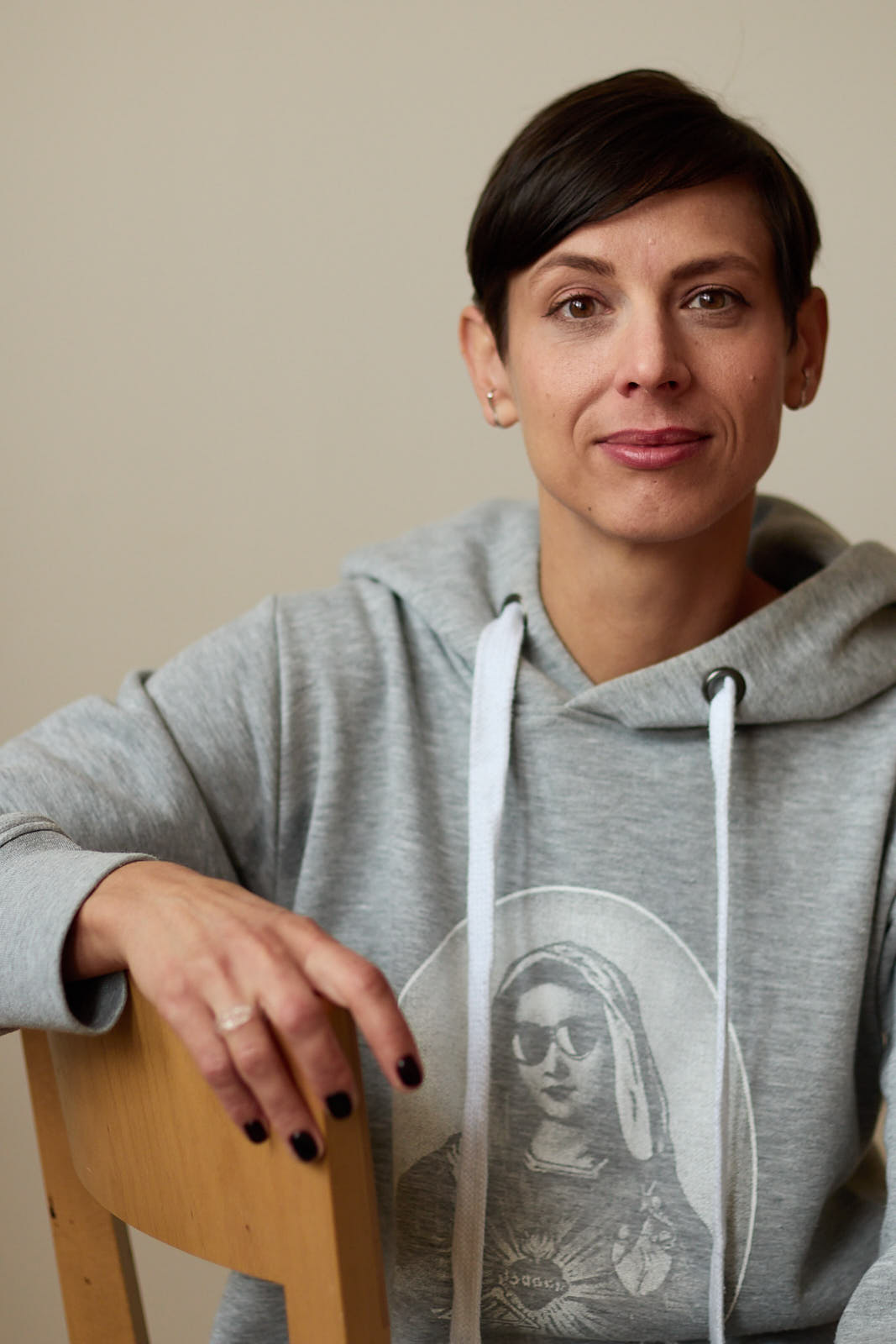
- Born: 2 December 1983 (age 42) Kyiv, Ukraine

Marie Iljašenko (born 2 December 1983) is a Czech poet, writer and translator. She is a laureate of the Tom Stoppard Prize (2023).

== Biography ==
She was born in Kyiv, Ukraine, into a family of Ukraine-Czech-Polish descent. In 1992, her family moved to Czechoslovakia, where she grew up in the Broumov region and later graduated from Charles University in Prague, majoring in Comparative Literature and East-European Studies. She also studied at the Adam Mickiewicz University in Poznań and the University of Gdańsk.

== Works ==
Her collection of poems Osip míří na jih (Osip Heads South) was published in Czech in 2015, and won critical acclaim.

The annotation to the collection reads: Osip míří na jih is a collection of poetry that speaks to the heart of Central Europeans. The "cultural mix" established in the author's early childhood and her degree in comparative literature has left a natural imprint on her texts. Charting real and imaginary journeys through Central Europe] the collection takes us to Prague, Gdansk, Passau, and elsewhere. Simultaneously, it captures staying put. Iljašenko uniquely makes present moments one is held in motion, when one can stop and feel both joy and tension.”

Her writings are translated into English German, French, Polish, Spanish, Hungarian, Ukrainian, Slovenian, Romanian, and Japanese. Her poetry was set to music by French composer Philippe Manoury and young Czech composer Soňa Vetchá. Most recently (2023) she won the Tom Stoppard Prize for her essay "I’m Local Everywhere Around Here".

== Translations ==
In addition, she translates contemporary poetry from Ukrainian and Polish to Czech (e.g., Yurii Andrukhovych, Olena Huseinova, Dmytro Lazutkin, Halyna Kruk, Iya Kiva, Taras Prokhasko; e.g., Anna Adamowicz, Zofia Bałdyga, Urzsula Honek, Agata Jabłońska, Iwona Witkowska, Urszula Zajączkowska, etc.).

== Books ==
- Osip míří na jih (Host, 2015) [Osip Heads South]
- Sv. Outdoor (Host, 2019) [St. Outdoor]
- Zvířata přicházejí do města (Host, 2025) [Animals are coming to town]

== Foreign anthologies ==
- Sąsiadki. 10 poetek czeskich (Wydawnictwo Warstwy, 2019)
- Itt minden tele van zenével. 35 kortárs cseh költő. (Petőfi Kulturális Ügynökség, Budapest, 2021)
- Come Closer. The Biennale Reader (Tranzit, Prague 2022)
- De sombra y terciopelo: Diecisiete poetas checas (1963–1988) (Vaso Roto, 2022)
- Teflon 29, summer - autumn, 2023
