= Patrik Ouředník =

Czech author and translator

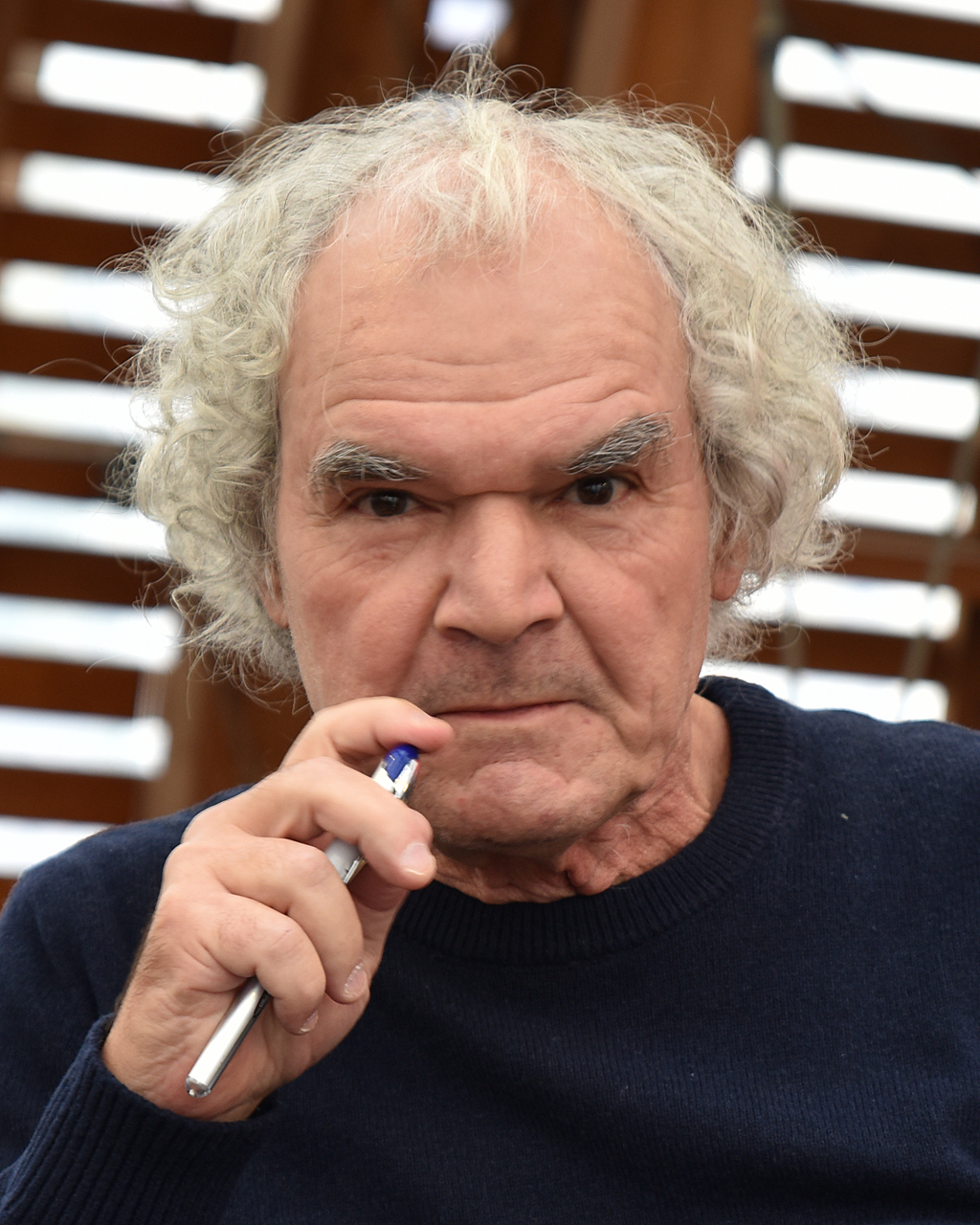
- Patrik Ouředník in 2025
- Born: 23 April 1957 (age 69); Prague, Czechoslovakia
- Citizenship: France
- Occupations: Writer, translator
- Writing career
- Genre: Novel Poetry Dramaturgy Lexicography Translation
- Notable works: Europeana. A Brief History of the Twentieth Century (2001); The Opportune Moment, 1855 (2005); Case Closed (2006)
- Notable awards: Josef Jungmann Award (2022); Czech State Literature Prize (2014); Tom Stoppard Prize (2013); Prize Marguerite Yourcenar (2011); Prize Montesquieu (2010); Prize La Stampa (2007); Prize Lidové noviny (2001); Czech Radio Award (1992)
- Website: nllg.eu

Patrik Ouředník (in French sometimes known as Patrick; born 23 April 1957) is a Czech author and translator, living in France.

== Biography ==
Ouředník was born on 23 April 1957 in Prague, Czechoslovakia. He spent his youth in Prague. In 1984 he emigrated to France, where he first worked as a chess consultant, then as a librarian. From 1986 to 1998 he served as editor and head of the literature section of the quarterly L'Autre Europe. In 1992 he was instrumental in founding the Free University of Nouallaguet, and he has lectured there since 1995.

Translator from French into Czech (François Rabelais, Alfred Jarry, Raymond Queneau, Samuel Beckett, Henri Michaux, Boris Vian, Claude Simon...) and from Czech into French (Bohumil Hrabal, Vladimír Holan, Jan Skácel, Miroslav Holub, Jiří Gruša, Ivan Wernisch...), Ouředník is also the author of various literary texts.

== Work ==
Three of his novels were translated into English:

- Europeana. A Brief History of the Twentieth Century (Dalkey Archive Press, 2005): Book of the Year in the Czech Republic (per Lidové noviny), Top Shelf in United States (The Village Voice), translated into 33 languages (2017), Europeana is a mordant deconstruction of historical memory where all references—events, slogans, persons, dates—accumulate and then return, vague and vacillating, to alienate the reader.
- The Opportune Moment, 1855 (Dalkey Archive Press, 2011): Book of the Year in Italy (La Stampa). In 1855, a group of anarchists, communists, and libertarians leaves Europe for Brazil in order to establish the colony Fraternitas, based on the principles of community and egalitarianism. The project collapses, as does the linear narration.
- Case Closed (Dalkey Archive Press, 2010): Seemingly a detective novel, set in a dreamlike post-Communist Prague. Revolving around a fistful of harmless, humorous retirees who sit and chat on the local park bench, the plot is replete with mysterious hints, crippled language, unsolved crimes, at least one suspicious suicide, and a bizarre rape. Who, where, when, how, why?

A complete list of his work includes:

- The Rough-book of the Czech Language: A Dictionary of Unconventional Czech (Šmírbuch jazyka českého. Slovník nekonvenční češtiny), Paris, 1988.
- Or (Anebo), Prague, 1992.
- The Extraordinary Adventures of Prince Chicory... (O princi Čekankovi, jak putoval za princeznou...), Prague, 1993.
- And There Is No New Thing under the Sun: A Dictionary of Biblical and Parabiblical Expressions (Aniž jest co nového pod sluncem. Slova, rčení a úsloví biblického původu), Prague, 1994.
- Year Twenty-Four (Rok čtyřiadvacet), Prague,1995.
- If I Don't Say So (Neřkuli), Prague, 1996.
- In Search of Lost Language (Hledání ztraceného jazyka), Prague, 1997.
- 112 Ways to Roll a Barrel of Oil (Des 112 façons desquelles on peut faire rouler un tonneau à huile) (Limoges 1999, with Jiří Pelán).
- The Key Is at the Bar (Klíč je ve výčepu), Prague, 2000.
- 55 Types of Laced Boots to Keep Your Feet Warm in Winter (Des 55 espèces de brodequines dont on peut s'entourer les pieds en hiver) (Limoges 2001, with Jiří Pelán).
- Europeana: A Brief History of the Twentieth Century (Europeana: Stručné dějiny dvacátého věku), Prague, 2001.
- House of a Barefoot Man (Dům bosého) Prague, 2004.
- The Opportune Moment, 1855 (Příhodná chvíle, 1855), Prague, 2006.
- Case Closed (Ad acta), Prague, 2006.
- It Was Utopus Who Made Me an Island (Utopus to byl, kdo učinil mě ostrovem), Prague 2010.
- Today and After Tomorrow (Dnes a pozítří), Prague 2012.
- On the Free Exercise of Language (Svobodný prostor jazyka), Prague 2013. Winner of the Tom Stoppard Prize.
- A History of France: For Our Dearly Departed (Histoire de France. À notre chère disparue), Paris 2014 (in French).
- The End of the World Might Not Have Taken Place (La fin du monde n'aurait pas eu lieu), Paris 2017 (in French).
- Antialkoran. The strange world of T.H. (Antialkorán. Nejasný svět T.H., Prague 2018.
