= Václav Cílek =

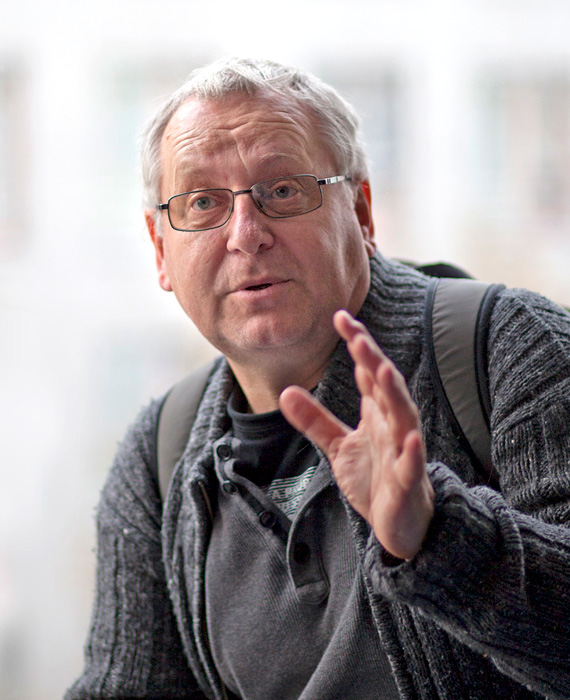
- Born: 11 May 1955 (age 70); Brno, Czechoslovakia

Václav Cílek (born 11 May 1955) is a Czech geologist, climatologist, writer, philosopher, science popularizer and translator of Tao and Zen texts.

== Biography ==
In his youth, Cílek moved to Tanzania, where his father worked as a geologist. From 1969 to 1970, he studied at a high school in Tanzania. Later he continued his studies at the Mining Technical School in Příbram (1970–1974). In 1979 he graduated in geology from the Charles University in Prague. Since 1980, he works in Geologic Institute of Czech Academy of Sciences and specializes on geology of Cenozoic Era. He also explores interactions between environment and civilization. Between 2004 and 2012, he was the director of the Geologic Institute of Czech Academy of Science.

Cílek also published several popularization books and many articles in journals and newspapers. During his career, he collaborated with Hospodářské noviny, Lidové noviny, Mladá fronta DNES, Mladý svět, Právo, Reflex, Respekt, Czech Television, Czech Radio etc. He was a co-creator of the TV series about caves of the Czech Republic, called Podzemní Čechy (The Underground Czech Republic, 2001).

In 2004, Cílek was awarded Tom Stoppard Prize for his books Krajiny vnitřní a vnější (2002) and Makom: Kniha míst (2004). Additionally, he was named Laureate by the Minister of Ecology for "valuable contribution to the popularization of Czech science, especially geology and climatology" (2007). In 2009, he was awarded the Václav Havel Foundation VIZE 97 Prize.

== Works ==
- 1985: Heavy Mineral Accumulations in Coastal Mozambique
- 1995: Podzemní Praha: Soupis podzemních objektů hlavního města a vybraná bibliografie, ISBN 80-85304-34-1
- 1997: Píseň pro odcházející duši
- 2002: Krajiny vnitřní a vnější: texty o paměti krajiny, smysluplném bobrovi, areálu jablkového štrůdlu a také o tom, proč lezeme na rozhlednu, ISBN 80-86569-29-2
- 2003: Střední Čechy: příroda, člověk, krajina, ISBN 80-86569-40-3 (coauthored by Vojen Ložek and Jarmila Kubíková)
- 2003: Velká kniha o klimatu Zemí koruny české, ISBN 978-80-86367-34-7 Jiří Svoboda, Zdeněk Vašků; (coauthored)
- 2004: Makom: kniha míst, ISBN 80-86569-91-8
- 2004: Vstoupit do krajiny. O přírodě a paměti středních Čech, ISBN 80-86569-58-6 (coauthored by Vojen Ložek and Pavel Mudra)
- 2004: Prague Between History and Dreams. US: Xlibris. ISBN 1-4134-3192-5
- 2005: Tichý břeh světa. ISBN 80-7363-036-2. (photography by Hana Rysová)
- 2005: Střední Brdy ISBN 80-7084-266-0, (ed.)
- 2006: Tsunami je stále s námi: eseje o klimatu, společnosti a katastrofách, ISBN 80-86851-22-2
- 2007: Nejistý plamen: Průvodce ropným světem. ISBN 978-80-7363-122-2. (coauthored by Martin Kašík)
- 2007: Borgesův svět. ISBN 978-80-7363-109-3
- 2008: Dýchat s ptáky: Obyčejné texty o světle paměti, pravdě oblaků a útěše míst ISBN 978-80-7363-202-1
- 2008: Podzemní Praha: Jeskyně, doly, štoly, krypty a podzemní pískovny velké Prahy, ISBN 978-80-7281-346-9. (photography by Milan Korba and Martin Majer)
- 2009: Orfeus: Kniha podzemních řek, ISBN 978-80-7363-244-1
- 2009: Krajina z druhé strany, ISBN 978-80-903759-5-6.
- 2010: Jak to vidí Václav Cílek, ISBN 978-80-86212-84-5 (interviews on Czech Radio)
- 2010: Archeus: Fragment radostné vědy o trpaslících ISBN 978-80-7363-290-8
- 2011: Krásná paní: Kameny domova,
- 2012: Prohlédni si tu zemi, ISBN 978-80-7363-419-3
