= Gimme the Money =

Gimme the Money is partial autobiographical novel by Iva Pekárková about her time taxi-driving in New York City. It was published in Czech in 1996 by Nakladatelství NLN (NLN Publishing), under the name Dej Mi Ty Prachy (Gimme the Money). It was later translated into English by Iva Pekárková with help from her husband, Raymond Johnson, and published by Serpent's Tail through a grant from the Czech Ministry of Culture. Gimme the Money was also translated into German under the title, Taxi Blues, by Marcela Euler and subsequently published in 2000 by Malik Publishers. The novel is about a female Czech taxi driver Jindřiška, nicknamed Gin, and her life of navigating and finding a place in New York City and the taxi industry.

== Plot ==
This novel begins with Gin and her roommate, Gloria, in their apartment. Readers learn that Gin makes her money from taxi driving and that she works at a garage under a Russian man named Alex who is constantly sexually harassing her. However, this does not seem to faze Gin, because this is what happened at the other garage where she worked under the dispatcher Kenny.

Several days later, Gin picks up a passenger named Clyde. Clyde and Gin sleep together and Gin is interested in him, but the relationship is broken off when Gloria sleeps with him. Gin is so distraught that she contemplates suicide, but then destroys all of Gloria's paintings in the apartment. Because she no longer has a place to live, she moves in with Talibe, her husband from Mali. He and Gin do not get along very well because their different cultural upbringings clash. The only reason Gin married him was so that she could get a green card.

Another day Gin is hanging out with a couple of other taxi drivers at a bar. One of these taxi drivers, Geoffrey, tells her that the only way for a taxi driver to make money is to cheat the customers by messing with the meter and using a book with fake prices. Ginny refuses because she does not want to get fined. Geoffrey and his friend, Sengane, talk about the times they have murdered some aggressive passenger while they were driving.

While she is living with Talibe he asks her to marry his cousin, Ouagadougou, because Ouagadougou needs a green card. Gin initially refuses because she does not want to get in trouble with the authorities and risk deportation herself. However, she gives in because Talibe threatens to divorce her and marry someone else who will agree to marry as many of his family members as he needs. The day after her wedding with Ouagadougou, one of Talibe's friends calls Gin telling her that Talibe was shot while taxi driving.

While Talibe is recovering in the hospital, he is distressed because he had a blood transfusion. In Mali culture, blood is very important, and Talibe is disgusted that the blood inside him is not his. He is also confused because he was shot while wearing his protective amulet, and he does not understand why the magic does not protect him. While Talibe could have gotten better, he died because his whole belief system crumbled.

Once Talibe dies, Gin wants to find another place to live because she does not want to go back to their apartment. She goes to her old boss, Kenny, and asks if she can stay with him for a while, but he refuses because, unbeknownst to her, he has a wife and kids. Gin then returns to Gloria to ask to stay at her place, but when she returns to her old apartment and sees Gloria, she realizes that she is still not over the betrayal and runs back to Talibe's apartment. When she arrives at her apartment Ouagadougou is waiting for her. Because she is his wife, he argues, they should live together. Gin gives in, and Ouagadougou moves into the apartment with her.

After Talibe's death Gin takes a couple of weeks off taxi-driving. When she returns to Alex's garage he has a brand-new fleet of taxis. She also visits Kenny, and he gives her a knife to protect herself while taxi driving. However, Gin feels less safe with the knife in her bag.

One night when she was picking up customers, a passenger gets into her taxicab who gives Gin a bad vibe. He is not clear in his directions, but eventually they end up underneath Macombs Dam Bridge next to an abandoned part of Jackie Robinson Park. The passenger pulls a gun on her and starts telling her how he is going to kill her like he killed other people in that spot. While listening to his description of his last kill, Gin realizes that this is the man who killed her husband. When the man asks for her money, she hands it to him through the partition and cuts him with the knife that Kenny gave her. The man pulls his hand back and his gun flies into the front seat. Gin gets out of the car and starts running, but Stanley, the robber, tackles her. When she is falling, she flips the knife behind her and it sinks into Stanley's heart; killing him instantly.

Once she has made sure that he is dead she cleans up the scene as best she can and drives away. For the next couple of months, she is paranoid that the police are going to find out who killed this man and arrest her, but nothing happens. She continues to work, and she discovers that Alex's new fleet of taxis are stolen police cars. However, because she has killed someone she does not see how breaking the law is such a big deal anymore. She also starts making more money by cheating her passengers using the tricks that Geoffrey and Kenny taught her. The book ends with Gin driving out of New York in her yellow taxi with an unknown lover to see the rest of the United States.

== Main characters ==
- Gin (Jindřiška): a female taxi driver from Prague living in the not so glamorous part of New York City
- Gloria: Gin's Cuban roommate who was born and raised in Harlem
- Randy: a homeless man who is a friend of Gin's
- Alex: the Russian owner and dispatcher at the taxi company where Gin works
- Talibe: Gin's first husband from Mali who dies while taxi driving by a serial killer
- Kenny: Gin's boss at the previous garage where she worked
- Clyde: Gin's boyfriend who cheats on her with Gloria
- Geoffrey: one of Gin's colleagues
- Ouagadougou: Gin's second husband and Talibe's cousin
- Stanley: the serial killer who kills Talibe and tries to kill Gin, but is accidentally killed by Gin

== Author's Inspiration for Gimme the Money ==
Gimme the Money was loosely based on Iva Pekárková's experience as a taxi-driver in New York City. She said in an interview with The Central Europe Review that she made Gin "...more naive than I was, so that she could discover more, so that it would be more shocking for her." Pekárková finds that it is easier for her to write stories where cultures are being blended, because she sees that as interesting. Likewise, she finds it difficult to write stories about the Czech Republic, because she cannot find any new or interesting stories from her home country. Gimme the Money has both the clashing of cultures and the Czech influence through Gin's views on New York.

== Translation ==
While the majority of the English translation was completed by Iva Pekárková, in order for the publisher to obtain a grant from the Czech Ministry of Culture, they included her husband, Raymond Johnson, in the translation. While he did not translate the novel, he helped Pekárková with editing the translation. Gimme the Money was also translated into German by Marcela Euler under the title: Taxi Blues.

== Critical reception ==
Gimme the Money was described by Madelaine Hron, Associate Professor at Wilfrid Laurier University for English and Film Studies, as "Fresh, gutsy, hilarious, the novel is one terrific (and terrifying) joy-ride through New York, propelled by a Czech taxi driver—a woman taxi driver at that." She also appreciated how even though the novel was about New York, Gin's Croatian roots did not get lost.
