= Josef Jungmann Award =

Czech Translation Award

- Awarded for: The best original translation into Czech published during the previous year
- Sponsored by: Czech Literary Translators Guild
- Country: Czech Republic
- Established: 1992 (for works published in 1991)
- Website: http://www.obecprekladatelu.cz/cena-josefa-jungmanna.htm

The Josef Jungmann Award (Czech: Cena Josefa Jungmanna) is an annual literary award for the best original translation into Czech. It was inaugurated in 1992 (for the year 1991) and is conferred by the Czech Literary Translators Guild. It is named after Josef Jungmann, a prominent Czech linguist and translator of the early 19th century. The prize is announced every year on International Translation Day (30 September, the day of Saint Jerome, who is the patron saint of translators), awarded to the best translation published during the previous year.

== Winners ==
Year	Translator	Work (Czech/original title)	Author	Language	Publisher
2024	Josef Jungmann	Barva léta aneb Nová zahrada pozemských rozkoší	Reinaldo Arenas	Spanish	Argo
2023	Michal Ctibor	Aeneis	Virgil	Latin	Argo
2022	Patrik Ouředník	Pantagruel	François Rabelais	French	Volvox Globator
2021	Zuzana Mayerová	Roky / The Years	Virginia Woolf	English	Odeon
2020	Vít Kazmar	Op Oloop	Juan Filloy	Spanish	Rubato
2019	Alice Flemrová	Všichni mají pravdu	Paolo Sorrentino	Italian	dybbuk
2018	Vladimír Medek	Polský jezdec	Antonio Muñoz Molina	Spanish	Leda
2017	Šimon Pellar	Bílá velryba / Moby-Dick	Herman Melvill	English	Odeon
2016	Josef Forbelský	Persiles a Sigismunda / Los trabajos de Persiles y Sigismunda	Miguel de Cervantes	Spanish	Academia
2015	Iveta Mikešová	Pískový vrch	Joanna Bator	Polish	Paseka
2014	Jiří Našinec	S bubnem na zajíce chodil	Bogdan Suceavă	Romanian	Paseka
2013	Robert Svoboda	Harmonia caelestis	Péter Esterházy	Hungarian	Academia
2012	Anežka Charvátová	2666	Roberto Bolaño	Spanish	Argo
2011	Josef Rauvolf	Vize Codyho / Visions of Cody	Jack Kerouac	English	Argo
2010	Petr Zavadil	Tohle světlo	Antonio Gamoneda	Spanish	Agite/Fra
2009	Vlasta Dvořáčková	Okamžik. Dvojtečka. Tady	Wisława Szymborska	Polish	Pistorius a Olšanská
2008	Vlasta Dufková	Burití	João Guimarães Rosa	Portuguese	Torst
2007	Antonín Líman	Na vlnách	Masuji Ibuse	Japanese	Paseka
2006	Jindřich Vacek	Majsebuch aneb Kniha jidiš legend a příběhů / Ma'aseh Buch		Yiddish	Jindřich Vacek
2005	Jiří Hanuš	Lidská skvrna	Philip Roth	English	Volvox Globator
2004	Věra Koubová	Rozevřená fuga	Franz Wurm	German	Prostor
2003	Jan Čermák	Béowulf		Old English	Torst
2002	Vratislav Jiljí Slezák	Souborné dílo Hermanna Hesseho	Hermann Hesse	German	Argo
2001	Eduard Hodoušek	Regentka	Leopoldo Alas	Spanish	Arista
2000	Václav Jamek	Prostor uvnitř	Henri Michaux	French	Mladá fronta
1999	Jiří Josek	Hamlet	William Shakespeare	English	Romeo
1998	Kateřina Vinšová	Život - návod k použití	Georges Perec	French	Mladá fronta
1997	Martin Hilský	Sonety / Sonnets	William Shakespeare	English	Torst
1996	Jiří Pelán	O pohybu a nehybnosti jámy, Psaný kámen	Yves Bonnefoy	French	Torst
1995	Anna Nováková	Čevengur / Чевенгур	Andrei Platonov	Russian	Argo
1994	Jiří Stromšík	Masa a moc / Masse und Macht	Elias Canetti	German	Arcadia
1993	Radislav Hošek	Ústava / Πολιτεία	Plato	Ancient Greek	Svoboda-Libertas
1992	Hanuš Karlach	Potkanka / Die Rättin	Günter Grass	German	Mladá fronta
1991	Pavel Dominik	Lolita	Vladimir Nabokov	English	Odeon
