= Jan Čermák =

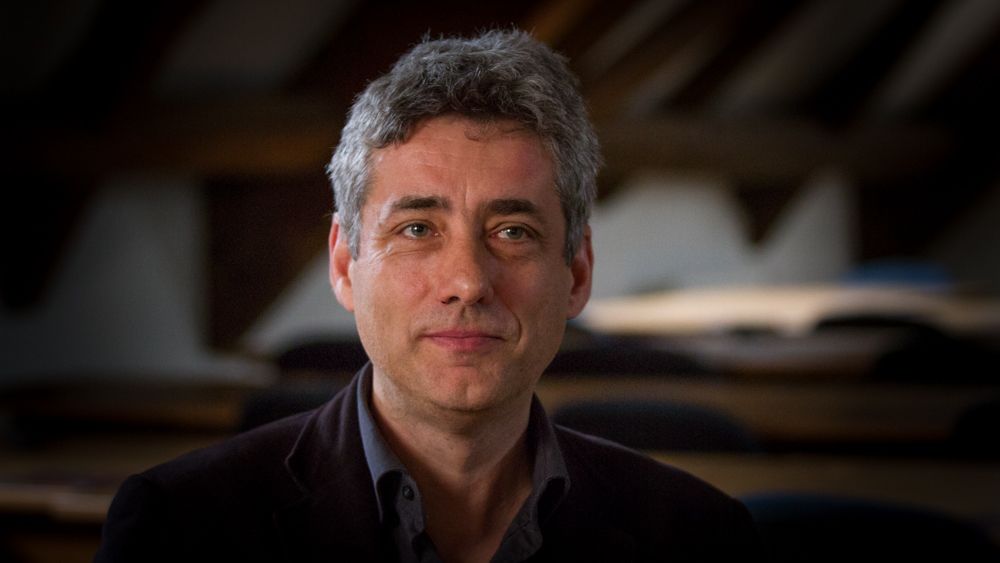
- Jan Čermák in 2014
- Born: 8 July 1962 (age 64); Prague, Czechoslovakia
- Occupations: Professor, Vice-dean of the Faculty of Arts, Charles University
- Parent: Josef Čermák
- Awards: Josef Jungmann Award, Order of the Lion of Finland

Academic background
- Education: Charles University

Academic work
- Discipline: English studies, Medieval studies
- Institutions: Charles University

Jan Čermák (born 8 July 1962) is a Czech linguist, literary scholar, and translator. Since 2022, he has been the Vice-dean of the Faculty of Arts, Charles University in Prague.

Čermák's research is focused on the history of English, with particular interests in Old and Early Middle English morphology and morphonology, word-formation and literary language. He is a specialist in Old and Middle English literature, with particular interests in heroic poetry, romance and the Alliterative Revival. He also wrote a book on the Finnish Kalevala.

His translations from Old English into Czech include Beowulf, The Exodus, The Dream of the Rood, The Rune Poem and a selection of the Anglo-Saxon laws.

In 2003, he won the Josef Jungmann Award for his translation of Beowulf into Czech, and in 2017, he was awarded the Order of the Lion of Finland.
