= Břetislav Bartoš =

Czech painter

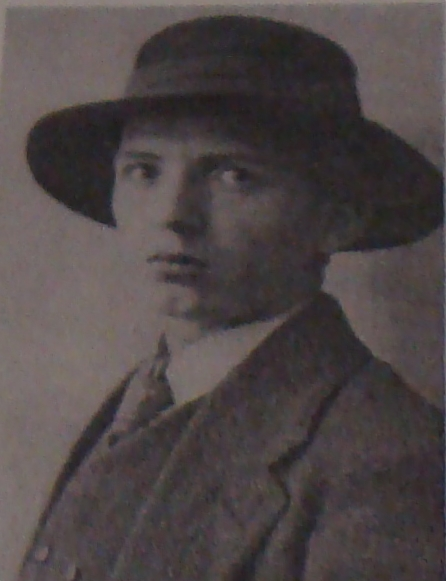
Břetislav Bartoš

Břetislav Bartoš (7 May 1893 in Frenštát pod Radhoštěm – 28 June 1926 in Dolní Mokropsy) was a Czech painter.

== Biography ==
During his studies at the Academy from 1909 to 1914 he was one of the last pupils of Professor Hanuš Schwaiger. In 1914 he co-founded the art association Koliba (Moravian art competition of the Prague meetings at which he also exhibited).

He fought in the World War I as a legionnaire in Italy and in his free time he painted pictures. He died in 1926 aged only 33 from tuberculosis.

In 2007, an exhibition was opened by his daughter.

== Style ==
His paintings displayed density and surface expression, often using sober tones, bordering earthiness. Some of his work was similar to Italian Renaissance paintings. His paintings often had symbolic overtones and he tried to express in his work social situation which sometimes occur and revolutionary themes.

== Gallery ==
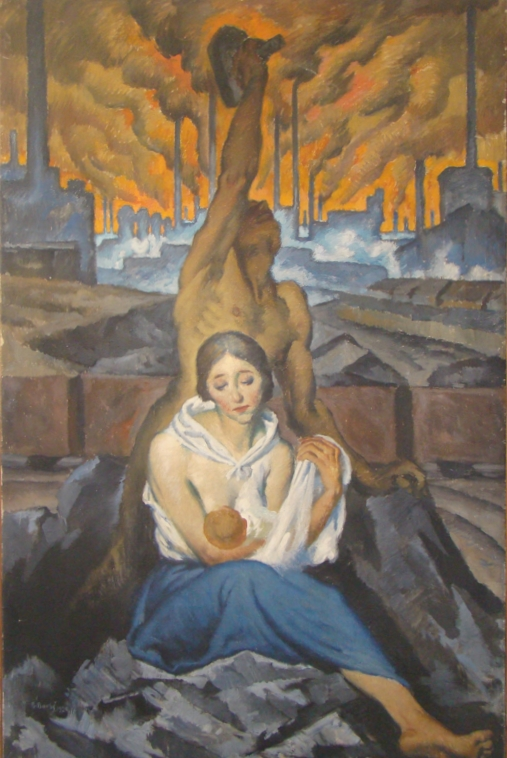
Black Earth

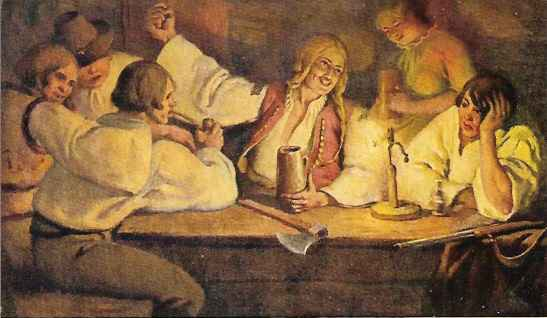
Wallachians

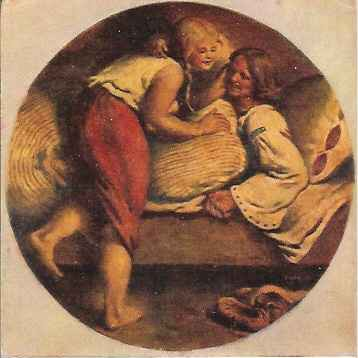
Wallachian costumes

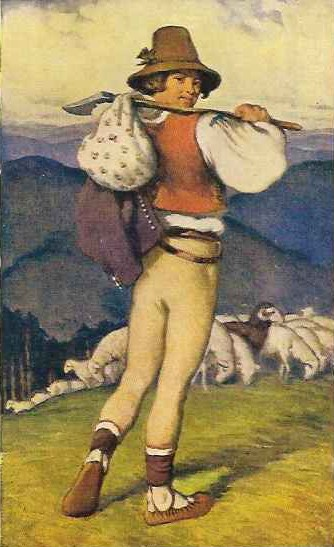
Wallachian costumes

== See also ==
- List of Czech painters
