= Ma'aseh Buch =

Collection of Yiddish stories from the 16th and 17th centuries

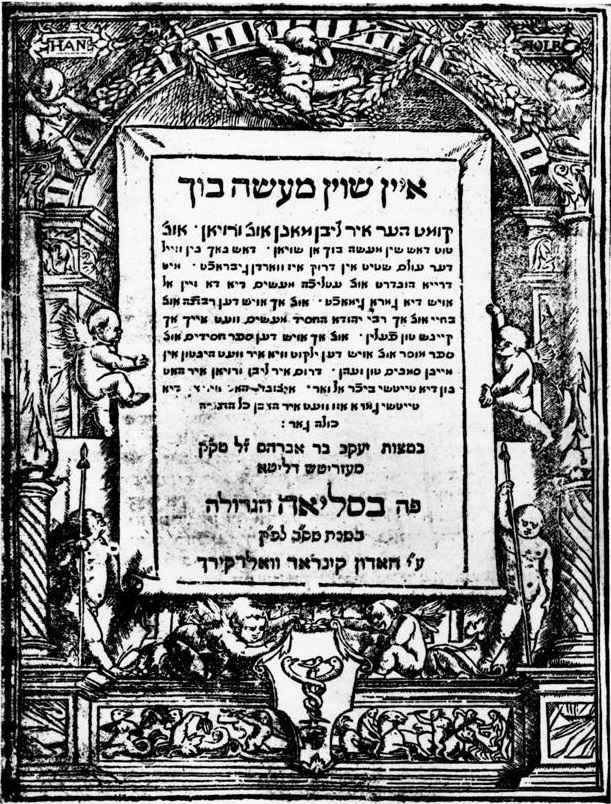
The title page of the 1602 print of Ma'aseh Buch

Ma'aseh Buch (and other transliterations) is a collection of orally transmitted Yiddish tales, sagas, legends, and parables compiled by Yaakov bar Avraham of Mezhirech (Note: Mezhirech (Yiddish: מעזשיריטש) was Międzyrzecz Korecki in Polish-Lithuanian Commonwealth, now Velyki Mezhyrichi, Ukraine (also known as "Mezrits Gadol", "Larger Mezrits" in Hebrew texts )) and first published by Konrad Waldkirch in Basle, Switzerland (now Basel) in 1602, written in Judeo-German. Its full title is Yiddish: אײַן שאָן מאַסאַה בוך, romanized: Eyn Shoyn Mayse Bukh, lit. 'A Beautiful Story Book'. It was reprinted many times in Yiddish. It was translated into English by Moses Gaster in 1934, under the title Ma'aseh Book: Book of Jewish Tales and Legends Translated from the Judeo-German (in two volumes).

== Background ==
Collections of legends and tales (ma'asim) printed in Judeo-German date back to the early 15th century. It was a separate category evolved after the earlier Judeo-German literature, which was based on Jewish religious texts. The category of ma'aseh books was aimed at women and girls, who (unlike men) seldom learned Hebrew.

== Contents ==
The prologue states that the book is intended for women, as well as for men "who are like women", i.e., do not know Hebrew. It was printed in a typeface known as vaybertaytsh (women's taytsh, i.e., "women's Yiddish" in modern terms).

It contains many purely entertaining stories, such as the tale of the man breastfeeding his child, the slandered woman, the separated family, the stolen child, the Jewish pope, the rabbi turned into a werewolf, and more. Astrid Starck writes that women play a noticeable role in the book: over half of the stories have a woman protagonist, although always associated with a man, such as a husband, father, brother-in-law, or lover.

Yoav Elstein and Ariela Krasny classify the stories from Ma'aseh Buch into the following groups:

- Talmudic and Midrashic sources.
- Medieval midrash and moral books.
- Stories taken from European tales, especially Italian ones, through the mediation of Jewish stories, such as from the book כַּפְתּוֹר וָפֶרַח, Kaftor VaFerach by Rabbi Ya'akov Luzzato.
- Jewish stories from the Middle Ages, especially those of the Ashkenazi sages.
- Stories taken from German or international folklore.
- Stories taken from Christian ecclesiastical sources. (Most of the material about Rabbi Judah HeHasid is shaped by the influence of Christian story forms.)
- Spielmannsdichtung.

== Translations ==
As of 2006, it was translated into English (1934), German (several prints over years), French (2004), Czech (2006), and Hebrew (2016).

The English translation contains 254 stories in the main text and three more in the Appendix to vol. 2.

The 2004 French translation is the first complete one, with a facsimile of the editio princeps.

The Czech translation Majsebuch aneb Kniha jidiš legend a příběhů by Jindřich Vacek earned him the 2006 Josef Jungmann Award.
