= My Companions in the Bleak House =

Novel by Eva Kantůrková

- Author: Eva Kantůrková
- Original title: Přítelkyně z domu smutku
- Language: Czech
- Subject: Political imprisonment, incarceration of women
- Genre: Fiction, memoir
- Set in: Ruzyně, Prague
- Publication date: 1984 (Cologne), 1990 (Prague)
- English publication date: 1987
- Pages: 304 (English)
- Awards: Tom Stoppard Prize
- ISBN: 978-0-87951-289-7 1st US ed.

My Companions in the Bleak House (Czech: Přítelkyně z domu smutku) is a novel by Czech author Eva Kantůrková, first published in 1984, and was the first recipient of the Tom Stoppard Prize. It is a fictionalised account of Kantůrková's time in prison on charges of sedition in Communist Czechoslovakia. In 1992 it was adapted into a 4 1/2-hour miniseries, which won two awards at the Festival International de Programmes Audiovisuels.

== Writing ==
The book tells the story of twelve female prisoners held in Ruzyně prison in Prague, in the form of a fictionalized memoir. Arrested in 1981, the author was herself held there for eleven months in for sedition after signing Charter 77, which criticised the Czechoslovak Socialist Republic for human rights failings related to the Helsinki Accords. Kantůrková herself does not appear in the book, which is narrated by a character called Eva. The title is a reference to Charles Dickens' novel Bleak House, which satirised the English justice system.

In the book, Kantůrková spells out seven rules for life as a prisoner of conscience:

1. Never let them catch you out.
2. Name no names.
3. Dictate your statement yourself.
4. Stay calm and smiling.
5. Never say more than you need.
6. Don't let them get you down physically.
7. At least once a day, rise above the banality of prison life

The narrative takes place from 8 March to 8 March, beginning and ending on International Women's Day.

Aspects of the characters' prison life include diseases, interrogations, the exercise yard under close guard, improvised cosmetics and Christmas decorations, a gypsy wedding and, in the last chapter of the book, séances. A Hungarian Romani woman called Fanny teaches the others to dance the csárdás and sings folk-tunes. Much of the book concerns the women's communications with each other and with the male prisoners housed below them, by passing notes on string or through bars, tapping on heating pipes and the floor in Morse code, yelling into the toilet system, and through song.

== Publication ==
The Czech language original was published in 1984 in Cologne, Germany. An English translation was published in 1987 by The Overlook Press with an introduction by Václav Havel, who himself spent several stretches of time in Ruzyně. It was the first of Kantůrková's novels to be translated into English.

At the time the book was written, Kantůrková was not allowed to publish in Czechoslovakia, nor to leave the country. The translator chose to remain anonymous.

== Reception ==
The New York Times review by Frances Padorr Brent somewhat criticised both the translation, which is British-inflected, and the writing, which at times "slackens, as if the task of including everything about Ruzyně exhausts the author". Still, at its best, Padorr Brent said, "it is a record of human kindness that for those of us who have lived our lives in freedom can only be compared to the care sometimes given to loved ones who are sick".

A Los Angeles Times review of the book wrote that "the clarity, the imagination, the wit, the odd detail, the light-filled corners of Kantůrková's darkest observations are in the best Czech literary tradition" and that it "may indeed be the best novel of its genre since Solzhenitsyn's far bleaker One Day in the Life of Ivan Denisovich."

Publishers Weekly called My Companions in the Bleak House a "stunning tour-de-force".

It won the Tom Stoppard Prize in 1984 for the best work of Czechoslovak unofficial literature.

Attention has been paid to the fact that the book focuses exclusively on the stories of women, and particularly women in prison.

== Adaptation ==
My Companions in the Bleak House was made into a four-part miniseries for Czech Television in 1992, starring Ivana Chýlková. The four 70-minute episodes were written by Kantůrková with Václav Šašek. They were re-broadcast twice in 2001 and 2017, in commemoration of the 40th anniversary of Charter 77.

1. Dům smutku (lit. 'Bleak House')
2. Andy
3. Helga
4. Přítelkyně z domu smutku (lit. 'My Companions in the Bleak House')

At the 1994 Festival International de Programmes Audiovisuels in Cannes, My Companions in the Bleak House won the FIPA d'argent (silver) for Best Series or Miniseries, and Chýlková won the FIPA d'or (gold) for Best Actress.

== See also ==
- Irina Ratushinskaya
- Orange Is the New Black: My Year in a Women's Prison
