= Gerbrunn =

- Municipality
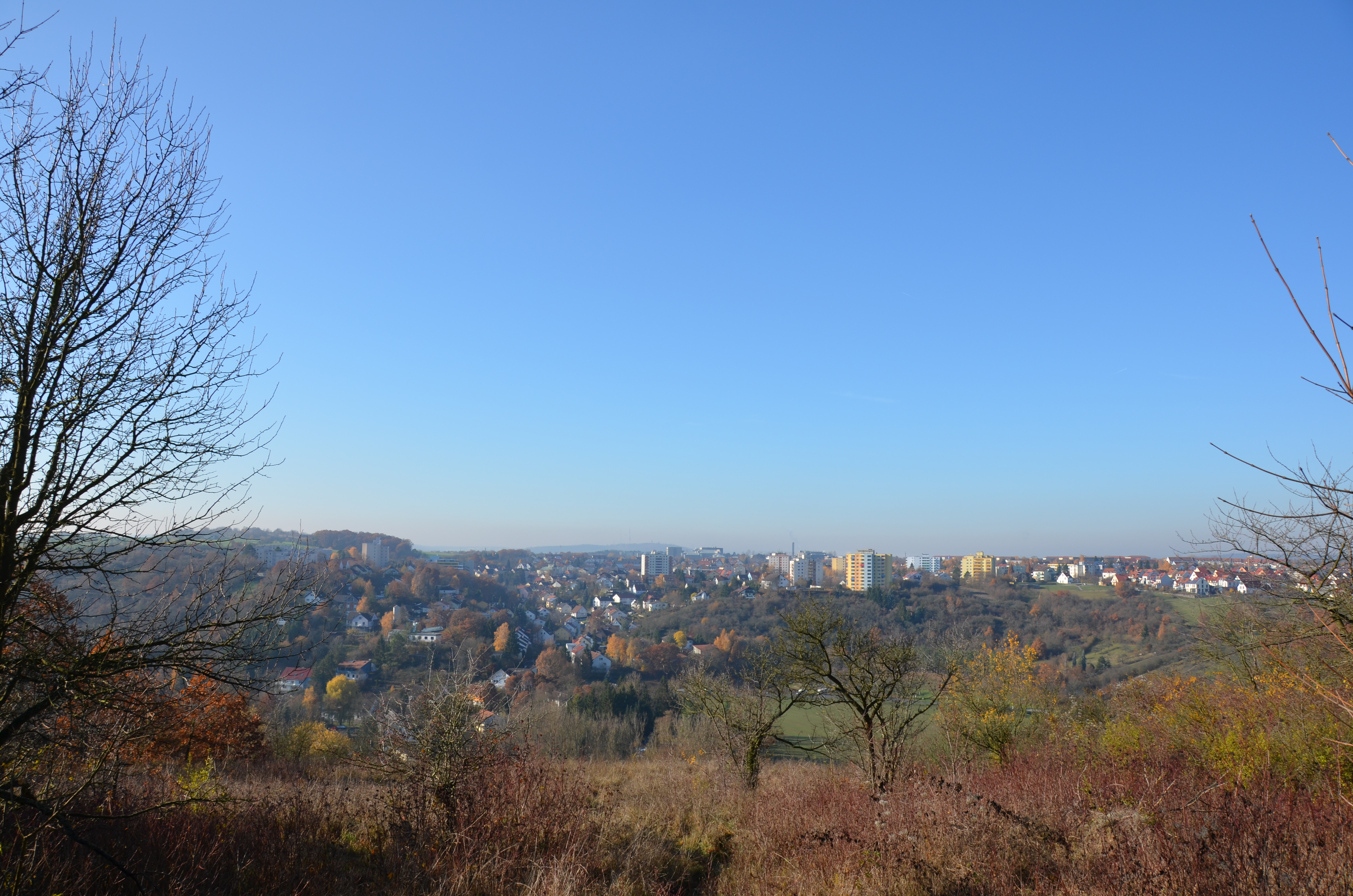
- General view of Gerbrunn

- Coat of arms

- Location of Gerbrunn within Würzburg district
- Interactive map of Gerbrunn
- Location within Germany Location within Bavaria
- Coordinates: 49°46′31″N 9°59′37″E
- Country: Germany
- State: Bavaria
- Admin. region: Unterfranken
- District: Würzburg

Government
  - Mayor (2020–26): Stefan Wolfshörndl (SPD)

Area
  - Total: 4.58 km^{2} (1.77 sq mi)
- Elevation: 244 m (801 ft)

Population (2025-12-31)
  - Total: 6,500
  - Density: 1,400/km^{2} (3,700/sq mi)
- Time zone: UTC+01:00 (CET)
  - Summer (DST): UTC+02:00 (CEST)
- Postal codes: 97218
- Dialling codes: 0931
- Vehicle registration: WÜ
- Website: www.gerbrunn.de

Gerbrunn is a municipality in the district of Würzburg in Bavaria in Germany. It is located about 3 km from Würzburg.

The name of the village stems from the contraction of the Althochdeutsche word Ger (throwing spear, because the village had originally the appearance of a spear) and Brunn (source, after the water source that is still flowing today near the city hall).

Another explanation does not trace the "Ger" in "Gerbrunn" to the throwing spear, but to an affluent Frankish aristocrat named Gerwine, who owned a water source in the area of Gerbrunn ("Gerwines Brunnen").

== History ==
In 1107 Gerbrunn was recognized for the first time in an official document. Gerbrunn became a part of the Hochstift Würzburg until 1803 when it was secularized and added to Bayern. In the Peace of Preßburg (1805) archduke Ferdinand von Toskana made it a part of the Grand Duchy of Würzburg. The Grand Duchy itself was added to Bayern in 1814. In the wake of administration reformation in Bayern, the current community was formed with the municipal edict of 1818.

== Coat of arms ==
The arms of Gerbrunn consists of three parts: the left upper part include the symbol of Castell (Unterfranken), right above the symbol of the Frankish Empire is shown; below the source is pictured. The coat of arms also functions as the logo of local sports club TSV Gerbrunn.
