= Putimov =

- Municipality
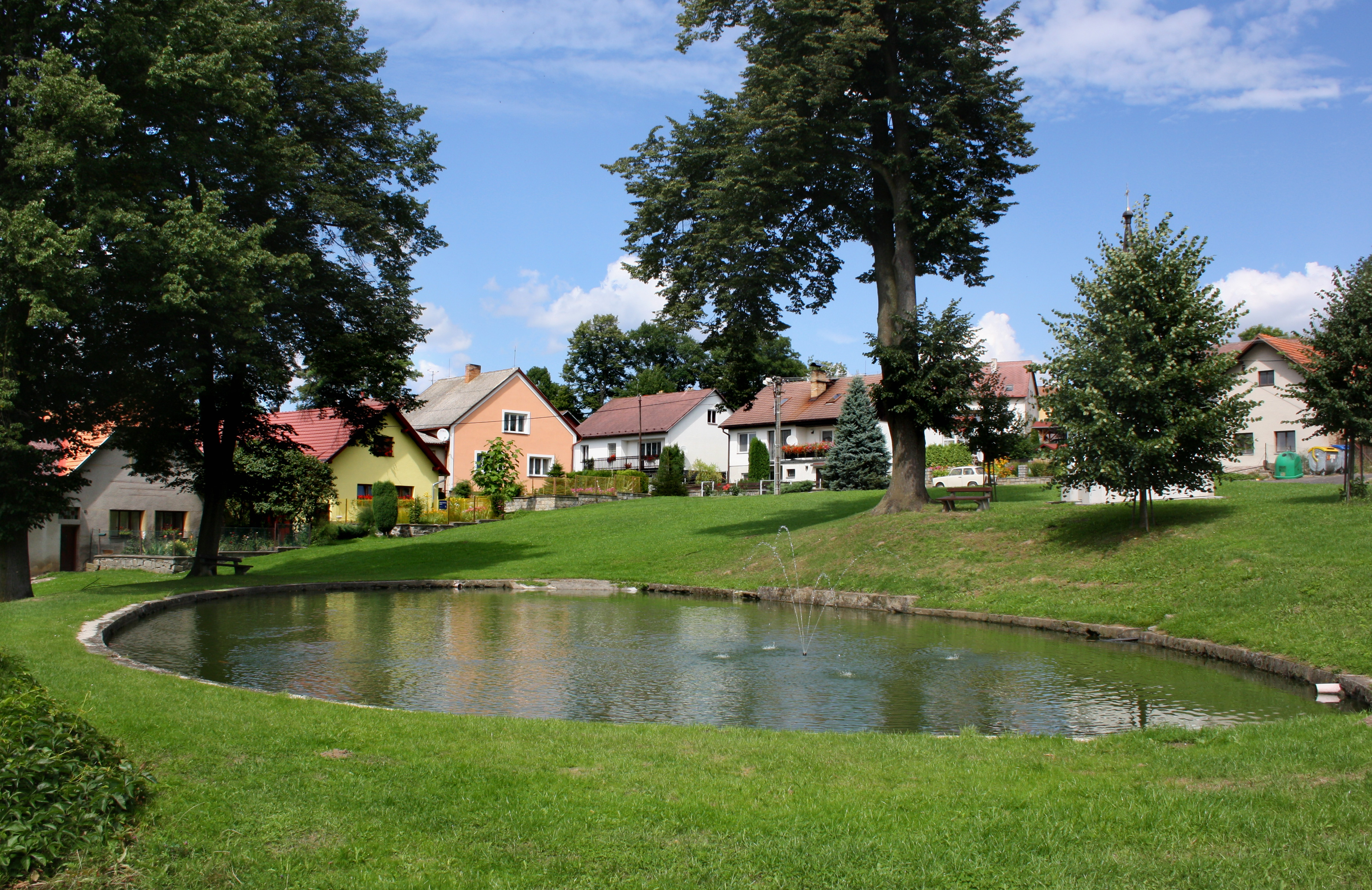
- Centre of Putimov

- Flag Coat of arms

- Location in the Czech Republic
- Coordinates: 49°24′50″N 15°16′8″E
- Country: Czech Republic
- Region: Vysočina
- District: Pelhřimov
- First mentioned: 1379

Area
  - Total: 3.21 km^{2} (1.24 sq mi)
- Elevation: 598 m (1,962 ft)

Population (2026-01-01)
  - Total: 287
  - Density: 89.4/km^{2} (232/sq mi)
- Time zone: UTC+1 (CET)
  - Summer (DST): UTC+2 (CEST)
- Postal code: 393 01
- Website: www.putimov.cz

Putimov is a municipality and village in Pelhřimov District in the Vysočina Region of the Czech Republic. It has about 300 inhabitants.

Putimov lies approximately 5 kilometres (3 mi) south-east of Pelhřimov, 24 km (15 mi) west of Jihlava, and 97 km (60 mi) south-east of Prague.

== Demographics ==
Historical population
Year	Pop.	±%
1869	264	—
1880	257	−2.7%
1890	291	+13.2%
1900	249	−14.4%
1910	270	+8.4%
1921	281	+4.1%
1930	287	+2.1%
1950	209	−27.2%
1961	167	−20.1%
1970	150	−10.2%
1980	166	+10.7%
1991	195	+17.5%
2001	226	+15.9%
2011	260	+15.0%
2021	266	+2.3%
Source: Censuses
