= Věra Linhartová =

Czech writer and art historian (1938–2026)

- Born: 22 March 1938; Brno, Czechoslovakia
- Died: 26 June 2026 (aged 88); Paris, France
- Education: Masaryk University, Charles University
- Occupations: Journalist, writer
- Writing career
- Notable awards: Neustadt International Prize for Literature

Věra Linhartová (22 March 1938 – 26 June 2026) was a Czech writer and art historian.

== Life and career ==
Linhartová was born in Brno on 22 March 1938. She studied art history at Masaryk University in Brno and aesthetics at Charles University in Prague. Linhartová worked in the art gallery at Hluboká Castle. From 1962 to 1965, she was involved with the surrealist group in Prague and also contributed to the young writers' journal Tvář. In 1968, Linhartová moved to Paris. From 1969, she wrote in French.

In 1972, she was the first female juror of the Neustadt International Prize for Literature, known then as Books Abroad. She nominated French author Nathalie Sarraute, but the Prize was awarded to Colombian author Gabriel García Márquez that year.

She studied Japanese language in Paris and from 1989 to 1990, she lived in Tokyo on a research grant.

Linhartová edited and translated Dada et Surréalisme au Japon (1987).

She received the Jaroslav Seifert Prize in 1998. In 2010, she received the F. X. Šalda Award and the Tom Stoppard prize for her collection of essays Soustředné kruhy (Collected Circles).

Linhartová died in Paris on 26 June 2026, at the age of 88.

== Selected works ==
- Meziprůzkum nejblíž uplynulého (Intersurvey of the nearest past), short stories (1964)
- Prostor k rozlišení (Space for differentiation), short stories (1964)
- Rozprava o zdviži (Discourse about a lift), prose (1965)
- Přestořeč (Despite speech), short stories (1966)
- Chiméra neboli Průřez cibulí, prose (1967)
- Dada et Surréalisme au Japon (Modern Art in Japan) (1987)
- Ianus tří tváří (Three-faced Janus), poetry (1993)
- Mes oubliettes (My dungeons) (1998)
- Soustředné kruhy, essays (2011)
