= Magdalena Wagnerová =

Czech writer (born 1960)

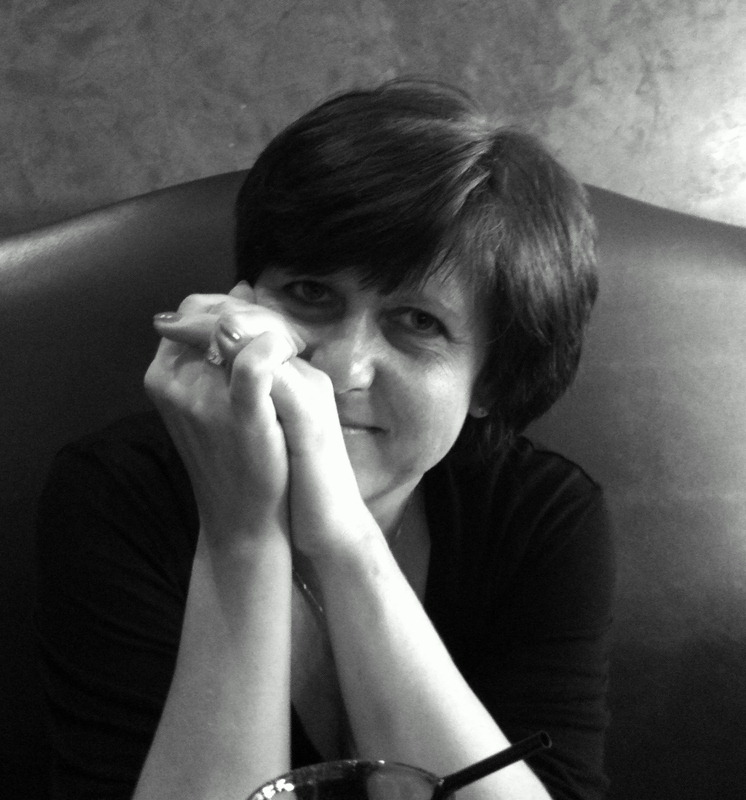
Magdalena Wagnerová in 2010

Magdalena Wagnerová (born 28 August 1960) is a Czech writer.

The daughter of photographer Josef Prošek and Irena Wenigová, a translator, she was born in Prague and studied screenwriting and script editing at the Film and TV School of the Academy of Performing Arts in Prague. She works as an editor.

Wagnerová has written short stories for children, radio plays and scripts for film and television. Her preferred genre is the fairy tale. She wrote scripts for the Czech film and television series Saturnin and for the televised fairy tale Hořké víno.

She was dramaturge for the international Winton Train memorial project, which culminated on 4 September 2009 at Liverpool Street Station in London with the meeting of the then hundred-year-old Sir Nicholas Winton with some of the Jewish children he had rescued.

Since 1995 Wagnerová has mainly worked as a writer of books. In 2000, together with Ivan Beránek, František Drtikol and Pavel Štefan, she founded a non-commercial book publishing house Havran, where she works as an editor and mainly publishes modern European prose in the Kamikaze edition.

== Selected works ==
Sources:

- Proč? Pohádky o rybách, ptácích a jiných zvířatech (Why? Stories about Fish, Birds and Other Animals), story collection (2001)
- Proto! Pohádky o muchomůrkách, pečených husách a jiných důležitých věcech (Here's why! Stories about Toadstools, Roast Goose and Other Important Things), story collection (2002)
- Srdce pohádek, story collection (2002), classic fairy tales retold
- Pohádky z vodních hlubin, story collection (2004), world folklore
- Pohádky z moře, story collection (2004), world folklore
- Papíří, novel (2005)
- Karel aneb Pohádka o našem deštníku, illustrated story (2005), Eva Koupová illustrator
- Krajina nedělní, novel (2010)
- Krys Veliký, illustrated story (2010), Tereza Tydlitátová illustrator
