= The Twelve Little Cakes =

2004 memoir by Dominika Dery

- First edition
- Author: Dominika Dery
- Cover artist: Honi Werner
- Language: English
- Genre: Biography
- Publisher: Riverhead
- Publication date: Sep 24, 2004
- Pages: 349
- ISBN: 1-57322-283-6
- OCLC: 62278863

The Twelve Little Cakes (2004) is a memoir by Czech author Dominika Dery. It tells stories from Dery's life that take place from before her conception up until her late childhood, as well as detailing life in an Eastern bloc country. The story includes holidays to Semily in northern Czechoslovakia and to Miedzyzdroje on Poland's Baltic coast.

Dery was born in 1975 in Černošice, a village just outside Prague in then-Czechoslovakia. Her mother Jana had decided to conceive another child after dreaming about a little girl. Dery's parents were dissidents who had taken part in the failed Prague Spring of 1968, causing them to live under suspicion: Jana's parents, who were among the Communist elite, disowned her, Jarda had difficulty finding or keeping a job, and the family always had to be wary of informers. However, the couple managed to raise their two daughters in a loving, even adventurous household despite their troubles. Dery's enrollment and progress in ballet school comes to the fore later in the story, culminating in performances at the Smetana and National Theatre in Prague.
