= Adolf Portmann =

Swiss zoologist (1897–1982)

- Born: May 27, 1897; Basel, Switzerland
- Died: June 28, 1982 (aged 85); Binningen, Switzerland
- Scientific career
- Fields: Biology, zoology, anthropology, philosophy

Adolf Portmann (Swiss Standard German: [ˈpɔrtman]; 27 May 1897 – 28 June 1982) was a Swiss zoologist who focused on the study of life based on its appearances, ranging from morphological to semiotic aspects.

== Biography ==
Born in Basel, he studied zoology at the University of Basel and worked later in Geneva, Munich, Paris and Berlin, but mainly in marine biology laboratories in France (Banyuls-sur-Mer, Roscoff, Villefranche-sur-Mer) and Helgoland.

In 1931, he became professor of zoology in Basel. His main research areas covered marine biology and comparative morphology of vertebrates. His work was often interdisciplinary, comprising morphological, behavioral, sociological, and philosophical aspects of the lives of animals and humans.

Portmann was known for his work in theoretical biology and his comparative studies on morphology and behavior. His research has influenced the field of biosemiotics.

Portmann died in Binningen, Switzerland, on 28 June 1982.

== Thought ==
Portmann's thinking was influenced by the structuralist atmosphere that prevailed at the time. According to his biological view, an external structure is a network of relationships that has a unity of context; the unity is the organism, the context is given by senses and meanings. In his book, 'The animal form', he wrote:

We must persuade ourselves that the appearances seen by our eye are the most important thing, instead of devaluing them to the level of a simple envelope which would conceal the essential.

For Portmann, the essential thing is not within the genes, but it is a dimension that in any case is not directly accessible. He thought that our sentimental connection with organisms, e.g., flower, butterfly, bird, cat, dog or whale, shows that we share a secret. Although our encounter with other living forms is through appearances, our feelings are testimony to the fact that there is an interiority on both sides. Organism's intimacy is not revealed as such, or it could no be considered a real intimacy, but in a way that scapes our rationality it has the power to demand a revelation. According to Portmann, biologists can address this problem by conferring relevance to the symbolic, to the appearances.

Form

Adolf Portmann defines life by focusing on the concept of form. For Portmann, each living form is represented on a "screen" structured for being seen or sensed in other ways (e.g. heard, tasted, etc.). Such a screen is only possible on opaque surfaces. The opaque surfaces of living things conceal their "interiority" in order to reveal forms full of meaning.

Contrary to the tradition of Neo-Darwinist geneticists who conceive life as based on a molecular dogma, Portmann argued that it is futile to search for the foundations of life in internal (e.g., atomic, molecular and genetic) causes. For the Swiss zoologist, influenced by Uexküll, the interiority of the organism is the basis of life, although such internal world is not truly accessible. Instead, Portmann emphasized the richness of meanings recognized on the surface of the organism, in its shape, texture, colors, and behaviors.

The forms that make up the exterior of living things stand out to the extent that they conceal an inner dimension (Innenwelt) from which their Umwelt is contemplated, and eventually transformed. The exterior possesses an aesthetic value, while internal organs are aesthetically poor. For example, in most vertebrates, the internal organs are arranged in a less symmetrical way compared to the exterior. This is true as long as the body is opaque. Portmann provides a counterexample with certain aquatic organisms, such as jellyfish and the glass frog whose skin is translucent. The glass frog has its internal organs arranged in a more symmetric manner compared to the rest of frog species which are opaque.

The aesthetic function

While Darwin acknowledged the importance of aesthetics in animals, Neo-Darwinism discarded non utilitarian functions in its modern synthesis. According to Portmann, animals are "characters" or "vector" objects, as they point from their interiority with "intention", revealing non-utilitarian functions, as there is room for capricious desires which manifest in elegant ways. Aesthetic functions are non-utilitarian. According to Portmann, if aesthetic forms serve a purpose, it is to reveal the organism's interiority—its inaccessible world—which partially becomes palpable in its skin, shell, horns, feathers, and habits.

Presence

Portmann highlighted how life forms somehow privilege external symmetry despite the asymmetry of their internal organs. It is as if the organism "knows" it is being observed, thus presenting its best aspect, which explains the greater symmetry and ornamentation of the exterior and the concealment of the asymmetries and "ugliness" of the interior. This opposition between inaccessible interiority and symbolic exteriority is inherent in life. Based on this idea, Portmann defined, in German, the concept "eigentliche Erscheinungen" which translates to 'current appearance' or 'act of presence' in English.

The actual appearance is the expression of the organism's self-representation. The phenomenon itself, as Karel Kleisner calls it, shows meanings, whether or not they have an obvious destination or recipient. Even if there is no apparent repository of meaning, there may still be a meaning. For Portmann, life is semiotic, and meanings and senses are biologically universal.

If the meaning has an obvious repository, it makes sense, and two options arise: the message is either "honest" or "dishonest."

Neo-Darwinism arrived at the notions of honest and dishonest from the concept of natural selection thus Mullerian and Batesian mimicries were established. However, Neo-Darwinism completely ignored the subjective (semiotic) charge of the notions of honest and dishonest, ultimately inevitable in the explanation of mimicry. For Neo-Darwinists, mimicry is set from a genetic expression, it is a consequence of individual success or survival; genes are selfish. On the other hand, for Portmann, mimicry is not necessarily a consequence (of genetic selection) but an effect of subjective, motivated causes. Portmann's phenomenological approach moved beyond Neo-Darwinism, contributing to the development of a new science: biosemiotics.

== Philosophical background ==
Portmann was influenced by the structuralist and phenomenological atmosphere that emerged in the early twentieth century, with figures like Edmund Husserl. Uexküll's thought contributed to this phenomenological atmosphere. For Husserl, Uexküll, and Portmann, life itself is the center of their world (Umwelt), a world that is felt and altered from within.

The idea that underlies and prevails, and that Portmann empowers, is that the objects entering the organism's Umwelt are revealed and experienced according to how the organism's perception is structured, following a certain grammar of interpretation or biosemiotics, which is universal. The organism's freedom is guaranteed by the random (irrational) combinations of symbols and their interpretations. The way the organism engages with form is a symbolic experience. Portmann, like the philosophers of phenomenology, recognized a structure of consciousness such that the organism interprets symbols, with or without the "illusion" of rationalizing them. For Husserl, Eduard von Hartmann, as well as for Portmann, (rational) objectivity is nothing more than an illusion, created from the subjectivity of the organism. Portmann's approach is irrational in the sense that Hartmann defines it, insofar as for the former the inner world of the organism is inaccessible directly.

Portman moves toward the macroscopic, against the historical current of the life sciences, which has extended from the macroscopic to the microscopic, moving in a continuum to the smallest possible, passing through the tissue, the cell, the chromosome, until affirming that the unit of life is the (selfish) gene.

== Contributions to biosemiotics ==
Portamann's fundamental contribution to Biosemiotics is to propose that the organism possesses an inner wealth of meanings that are not directly accessible to the scientist but are appreciated in their appearance.

From Umwelt to inner world

Unfolding the concept of Umwelt, initially proposed by Uexküll, Portann made significant contributions to the biosemiotic theory. Uexküll had already rebelled against the view of the organism as a mere conglomerate of mechanisms that respond to external stimuli, like a machine that dispenses soft drinks. Uexküll's notion of Umwelt, assimilated and adapted by Portmann, liberates biological thought from the constraints of classic mechanics, giving way to the symbolic.

Unlike Uexküll, Portmann did not deny natural selection. However, like León Croizat, he observed various scenarios where natural selection is secondary, where the structural and aesthetic prevail.

Semantic organ

In his concept of organic self-representation, Portmann considered the outer surface of living organisms as an organ fulfilling a "function" (not necessarily utilitarian) in self-representation. He used this idea as a starting point to elaborate and redefine concepts that biosemiotics scholars find compatible with the theoretical framework of biosemiotics. Despite the many theories that explain aposematism, camouflage, deception, and other phenomena related to mimicry, there is still a need for a more universal theory (than Neo-Darwinism) that synthesizes the evolutionary, morphogenetic, and semiotic aspects, as seen in the self-representation of organisms and their behavior. Adolf Portmann's concept of self-representation takes a significant step in this direction.

For Portmann, the semantic organ makes sense from a specific interpretation of the Umwelt of certain superficial patterns. These patterns begin to be distinguished in the course of morphogenetic processes during ontogenesis and phylogenesis. The persistence of the semantic organ is due to the act of self-representation and specific interpretation from the Umwelt. This suggests a scenario of conventions filled with meanings that allow the connection between two independent worlds, the inner world and the Umwelt. Natural selection is not strictly necessary in this scientific approach. The role of selection, if any, is defined by the significance within the organism's Umwelt, not the other way around. Natural selection does not explain why, for example, the black-and-yellow coloration pattern persists among tigers, certain snakes, and bees, even though these species have lifestyles that are largely disconnected from each other. In all these scenarios, this coloration pattern universally signals danger, even to humans. Natural selection does not account for why this pattern persists over another, such as pink and sky blue. Nor does it explain the elegance and grace observed in the Bengal tiger. Natural selection is secondary to the phenomena that accommodate, ontogenetically and phylogenetically, living forms. In other words, natural selection, if present, is secondary to orthogenesis (sensu Croizat). Natural selection is a possible rationalization within the human Umwelt that follows the logic of survival, while orthogenesis recognizes that things are perceived by the organism as they are, within an interpretative framework structured by conventions filled with meanings, whether these are arbitrary or not. Life does not obey the logic of survival but exists as it is ("Dasein" sensu Heidegger), despite the constraints imposed by survival. Life is a source of symbols that offer novelties due to the organism's freedom of interpretation. The semantic organ is therefore not primarily a utilitarian organ but a phenomenological organ.

== Contributions to anthropology ==
Adolf Portmann has attracted the attention of a significant and growing group of anthropologists captivated by his orthogenetic and anthropomorphic vision of life.

His critique of neo-Darwinism used as a background in his design of a biological framework to approach the interiority of Homo sapiens gained special attention from anthropologists. Portmann's consideration of human Umwelt has served modern anthropologists to approach (human) history as a biological hypothesis, as well.

Portmann's works as a whole constitute a metatheoretical instrument for interpreting the animal in the human, and the human in the animal, without the mechanistic detriment that geneticists assume of the living organism. That man is an animal is not a mutagenic consequence of our sharing a common genetic ancestor, it is an orthogenic sequel. Portmann recognizes an irrationalizable interior that has been pushing evolution for ancestral generations; man has achieved artifices that start from his nature but that also transcend its own nature.

Physiological prematurity

According to the concept of physiological prematurity (related to the concept of "neoteny"), humans are animals "born too early". Although the fetus undergoes the maturation of motor coordination and sensory organs in the womb, the human being is, at the moment of birth, comparatively helpless. This contrasts with the maturity and skills of other higher mammals at birth (e.g., elephants, horses). This characteristic of humans means that many developmental processes must be integrated into the sociocultural environment after birth. Due to their dependence on human social interactions and cultural influences, humans must remain open to them. According to Portmann, this special capacity for "openness" is a prerequisite for both cultural and spiritual learning.

Orthogenesis

In 1960 Adolf Portmann published a work entitled "Der Pfeil des Humanen: über P. Teilhard de Chardin" where he aligns his own thoughts with the proposal of the French paleontologist. The German word "pfeil" means arrow, thus the notion of direction is presented by both scientists to invoke orthogenesis. Homo sapiens is a species that breaks in the natural scenery, taking distance from natural selection. An example mentioned by Portmann is the fact that (artificial) vaccination plans render natural selection inoperative. Human culture is a second nature or supra-nature that cannot be explained as an effect of mutations but rather as result of human spiritual desires. Human society drives evolution, in other words, today, and increasingly, the fate of life effectively depends on human motivations. Portmann coincides with de Chardin; man's techniques are inventing a new way of life which is neither natural nor supernatural; furthermore, the man who is to come is not human but rather "trans-human".

== Publications ==
- Der einfluss der nähreier auf die larvenentwicklung von buccinum und purpura [The influence of nutrient eggs on the larval development of Buccinum and Purpura] (1925)
- Die Ontogenese der Vögel als Evolutionsproblem [The Ontogeny of Birds as an Evolutionary Problem] (1935)
- The Earth as the Home of Life (1954)
- Animals as Social Beings (1961)
- The central nervous system (1961)
- New Paths in Biology (1964)
- Metamorphosis in Animals: The Transformations of the Individual and the Type (1964)
- Animal Forms and Patterns: A Study of the Appearance of Animals (1967)
- Vom lebendigen [From the Living] (1973)
- Opisthobranchia des Mittelmeeres [Opisthobranchia of the Mediterranean] (1982)
- Goethe and the Concept of Metamorphosis (1987)
- La forme animale [The Animal Form] (2013)
- Essai in Philosophical Zoology by Adolf Portmann: The Living Form and the Seeing Eye (1990)
