= Sylvie Richterová =

Czech educator and writer

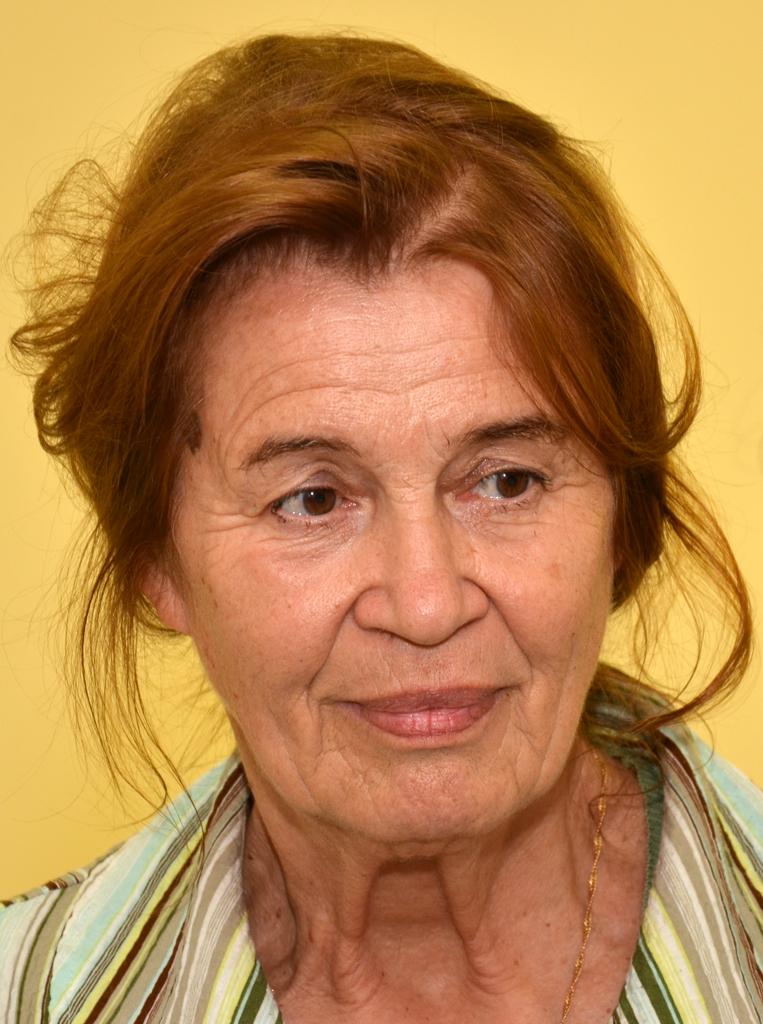
Sylvie Richterová in 2016

Sylvie Richterová (born 20 August 1945) is a Czech educator and writer living in Italy.

She was born in Brno and was educated as an interpreter at Charles University in Prague. In 1971, she moved to Italy, where she lectured in Czech and was a researcher at the Institute of Slavonic Philology. She went on to lecture on Czech language and literature in Padua and Viterbo.

Her first book Návraty a jiné ztráty (Returns and other losses), a collection of short stories, was written in Italy and was published by 68 Publishers in 1978. It was published in French as Retours et autres pertes in 1992.

Richterová has also translated works by Czech writers into Italian.

== Awards ==
- 2017 Tom Stoppard Prize

== Selected works ==
- Místopis (Topography), short stories (1981)
- Slova a ticho (Words and silence), essays (1986)
- Ticho a smích (Silence and laughter), essays (1997)
- Čas věčnost [Time Eternity], poems (2003)
- Místo domova [In Place of Home], essays (2004)
- "Každá věc ať dospěje na své místo" (– The Second Life of Jan Lazar), novel (2014)
- "Eseje o české literatuře" (Essays on Czech literature,) 2016
- "Tajné ohně" (Secret fires) poems (2020)
