= Zbyněk Hejda =

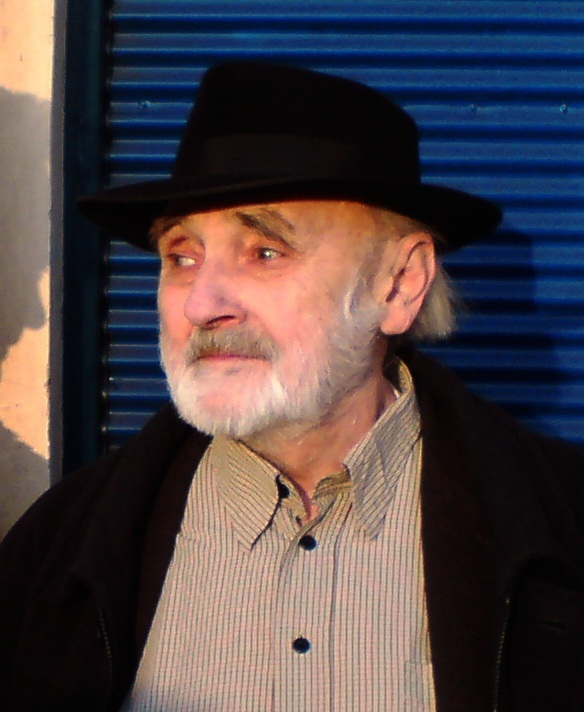

Zbyněk Hejda (2 February 1930, Hradec Králové – 16 November 2013, Prague) was a Czech poet, essayist and translator (mainly from English - Emily Dickinson; and German - Georg Trakl, Gottfried Benn).

== Life ==
He studied philosophy and history at the Faculty of Arts, Charles University in Prague. From 1953 to 1958, he taught the history of the Communist Party of Czechoslovakia at the Faculty of Arts. From 1958 to 1968, he worked at the Prague Information Service, and later in 1968 he started working in a publishing house but left the very same year together with the whole editorial staff. From 1968 to 1978 he worked in a second hand bookshop, until he signed the Charter 77 and was forced to leave. From 1981 to 1989 he worked as a caretaker. Since 1990 to 1995 he taught cultural anthropology at the 2nd Faculty of Medicine, Charles University.

== Work ==
Since 1959 he published his poetry in literary magazines, including Revolver Revue, in the Czechoslovak Republic, and in Czech exile magazines, such as Svědectví published by Pavel Tigrid in Paris. He received The Tom Stoppard Prize for his essays in 1989 and the Jaroslav Seifert Prize in 1996.

== Bibliography ==
- Všechna slast, 1964
- Blízkosti smrti, samizdat 1978, Munich 1985, Prague 1992
- Lady Felthamová, samizdat 1979, Paris 1987, Prague 1992
- Tři básně, samizdat 1987
- Pobyt v sanatoriu, 1993
- Nikoho tam nepotkám, 1994
- Valse mélancolique, Brno 1995
- Básně, 1996 (Collected Poems)
- Překlady, 1998 (Collected Translations)
- Cesta k Cerekvi, 2004
- Sny, 2007
