= Dominika Dery =

- Born: 7 March 1975 (age 51); Černošice
- Occupations: Journalist, writer

Dominika Dery (also known as Dominika Furmanová; born 7 March 1975 in Černošice) is a Czech journalist and writer.

She has published works of poetry, drama, and a memoir. The Twelve Little Cakes (2004), which chronicles her life up until the mid-eighties, is her first book in English.

== Works ==
- Přebolení : první sbírka básní z období mezi lety 1991-1997, 1999
- Český orloj, 2000
- Křížová cesta, The Way of the Cross, 2001 (poetry in Czech and English)
- The Twelve Little Cakes, 2004

== See also ==
- List of Czech writers
