= Iva Pekárková =

Czech writer (born 1963)

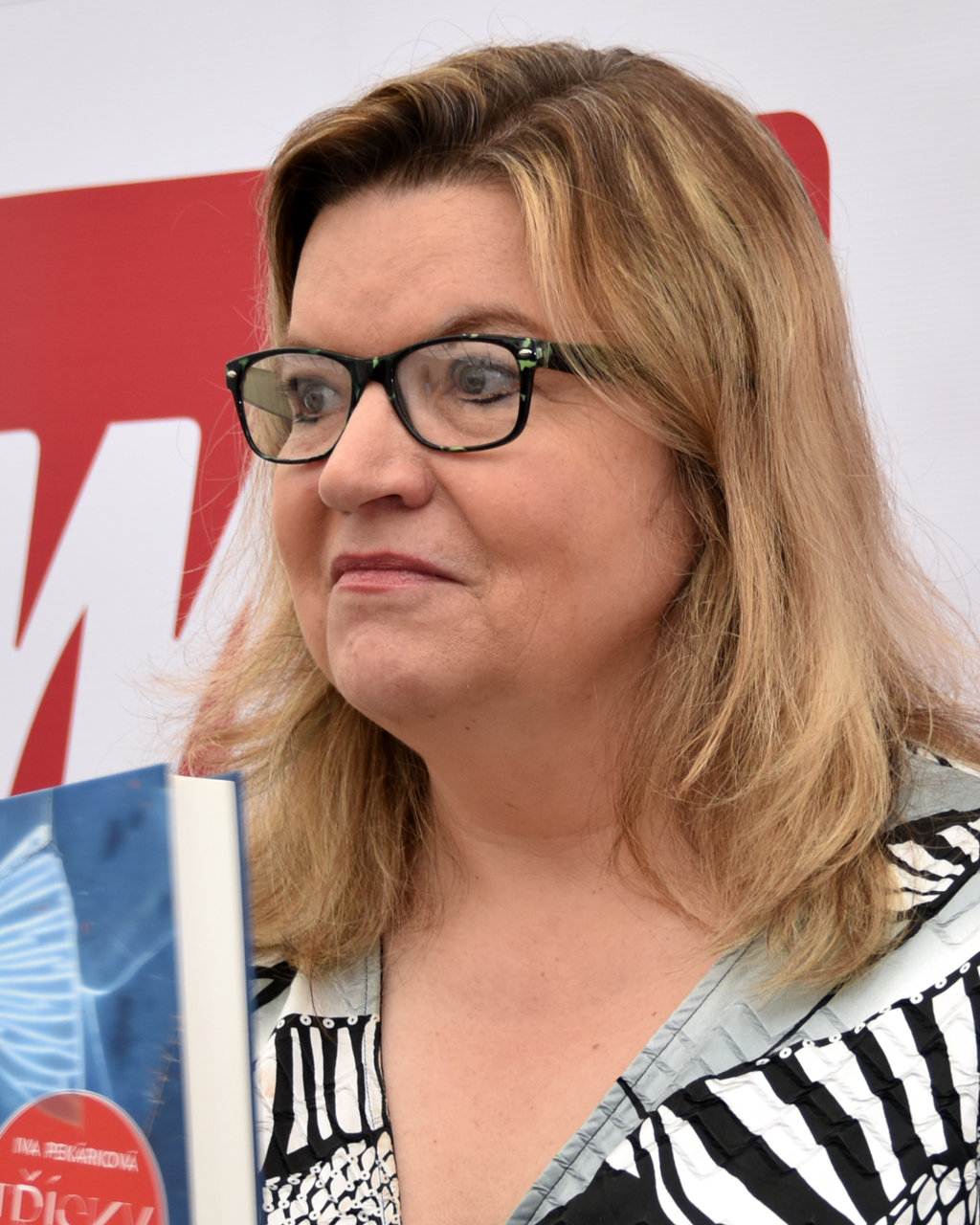
Iva Pekárková in 2019

Iva Pekárková (born 15 February 1963) is a Czech writer. She started writing and publishing novels when she lived in New York City in 1986–1996. Her novels are inspired by her various life experiences and she writes openly about sexuality, making her controversial in her native country. Most of her novels are originally written in Czech.

== Biography ==
Pekárková was born on 15 February 1963 in Prague, Czechoslovakia to the physicist Luděk Pekárek and the chemist Květa (Suchomelová) Pekárková. She attended Charles University from 1981 to 1985, where she studied microbiology and virology and began writing fiction.

In 1985, she defected to Austria and immigrated to the United States after spending a year in a refugee camp. In the US she held a number of occupations in New York City, including working as social worker in the Bronx and driving a limousine and a Yellow Cab. Pekárková returned to the Czech Republic in 1996.

Her first novel was Pera a perute (1989), translated into English by David Powelstock as Truck Stop Rainbows (1992), was about Fialka, a Prague university student who photographs botanical mutations resulting from Czechoslovakia's unchecked industrial pollution. When her friend Patrick is diagnosed with multiple sclerosis, she hitchhikes Czechoslovakia's Southern Road and prostitutes for truckers to pay for his wheelchair.

Her second novel, Kulatý svět (1994), translated into English by David Powelstock as The World is Round, was about Jitka, a Czechoslovak woman who flees the country for an Austrian refugee camp, where she is gang-raped. Eventually she gains asylum in Canada through a fabricated story.

Dej mi ty prachy (1996), translated by the author herself into English as Gimme the Money (2000), was about Gin, a Czechoslovak taxi driver in the US, based on Pekárková's experience driving a taxi in New York City.

Pekárková travelled to Thailand in 1988 and 1989 to study the refugee camps there, the inspiration for her novel Třicet dva chwanů (Thirty-two Kwan 2000). The Czech heroine is trapped in Thailand during the Velvet Revolution. Pekárková describes it as "another book about culture clashes" and contains "some of my ideas and observations about immigration and emigration." Visits to India and Nigeria inspired To India Where Else (2001) and Naidja: Stats in My Heart (2004). She published Six Billion Americas in 2005.

== Novels ==
- Pera a perutě, 1989 (translated into English by David Powelstock as Truck Stop Rainbows, 1992)
- Kulatý svět, (translated into English by David Powelstock as The World Is Round), 1994
- Dej mi ty prachy, 1996 (translated into English by the author as Gimme the Money, 2000)
