= Eva Kantůrková =

Czech author and screenwriter (born 1930)

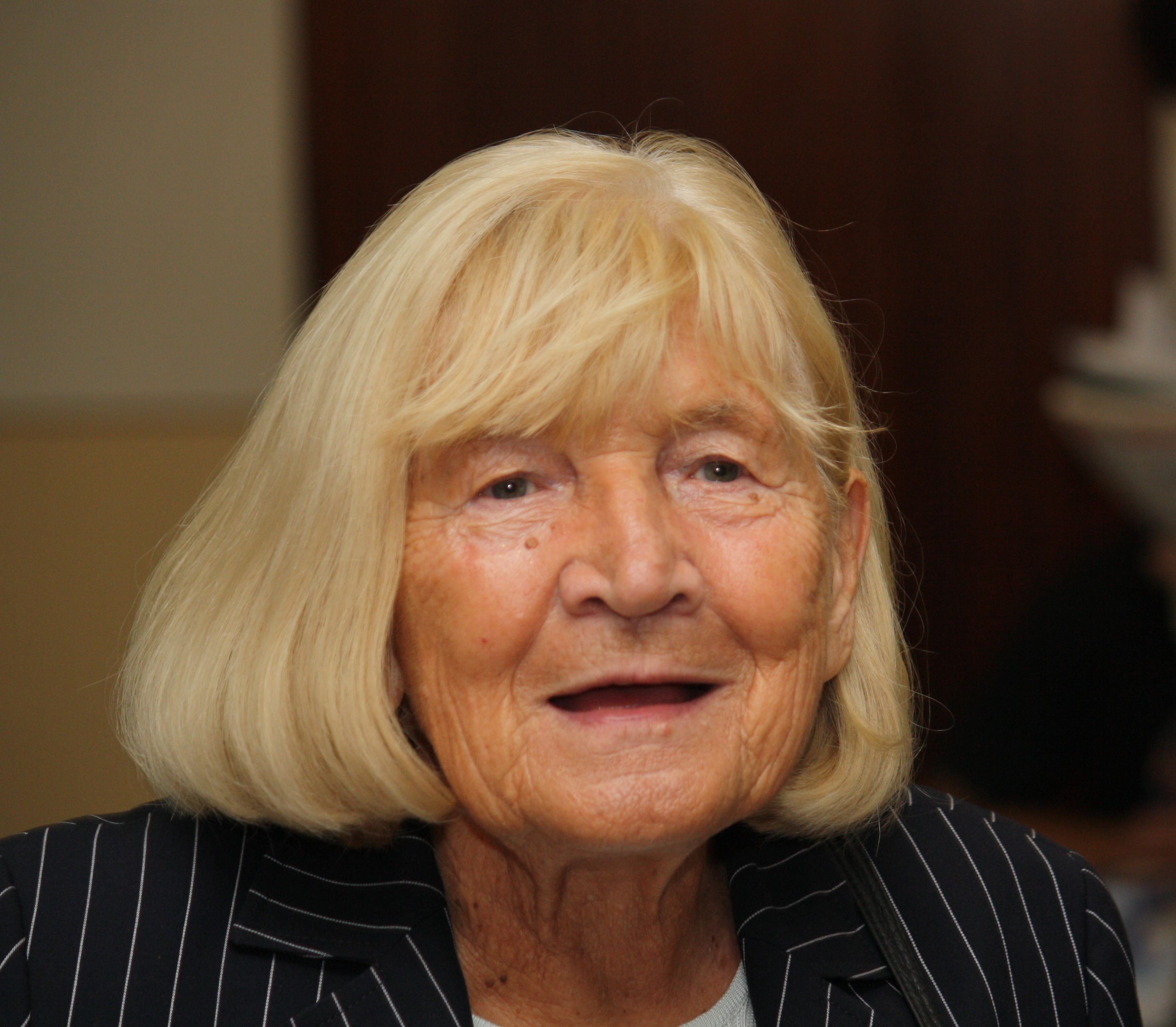
- Kantůrková at the 20th Autumn Book Fair in Havlíčkův Brod, Czech Republic, in 2010

Member of the Czech National Council
- In office 7 June 1990 – 4 June 1992

Personal details
- Born: Eva Sílová; 11 May 1930 (age 96) Prague, Czechoslovakia
- Party: Communist Party of Czechoslovakia (till 1970); Civic Forum
- Education: Charles University
- Occupation: author, screenwriter

Eva Kantůrková (born 11 May 1930) is a Czech author and screenwriter. A communist in her early years, she joined the Czech dissident movement after the Soviet invasion of Czechoslovakia and was one of the signatories of Charter 77. In her novels, short stories, historical essays, and diaries, she has chronicled the repression of Czech dissidents and explored themes of political and personal disillusionment.

== Early life ==
Kantůrková was born in Prague in 1930. Influenced by her communist father, she became involved in the communist youth movement, but the Soviet invasion of Czechoslovakia in 1968 caused her to reject the communist agenda. In 1970, she quit the communist party and joined the Czech dissident movement; she was blacklisted as a writer, her completed novels were removed from library shelves, and two screenplays she was developing were put on hiatus. Together with many prominent Czech writers and cultural figures, she signed the Charter 77 manifesto and, in 1979, she published We Have Met in this Book, a collection of interviews with Czech women dissidents. The publication of this book abroad led to her arrest on 5 June 1981. She was charged with "subversion" and held without trial for ten months. The experience inspired her 1984 novel My Companions in the Bleak House.

== Writing ==
Kantůrková garnered success as a writer with the 1967 publication of her first novel, The Funeral, which explored the death of a farmer caused by communist collectivization in the 1950s. From the late 1970s to the 90s, she wrote two collections of short stories and a trilogy of novels centering on political disappointment and disillusionment. Her other writing from the period, the novel The Master in the Tower and a historical work on Jan Hus, focused on the struggle between communism and Christianity. Kantůrková has continued to publish her memoirs and diaries, including the 1999 and 2000 diaries that she wrote in an effort to cope with her husband's death.

== Post-communist career ==
After the Velvet Revolution, Kantůrková served as president of the Czech Writer's Union and was a staff member in the Ministry of Culture. Zdenek Sirový's film Funeral Ceremonies, which was based on her novel, was released in 1990 after being banned for 20 years.
