= Czech literature =

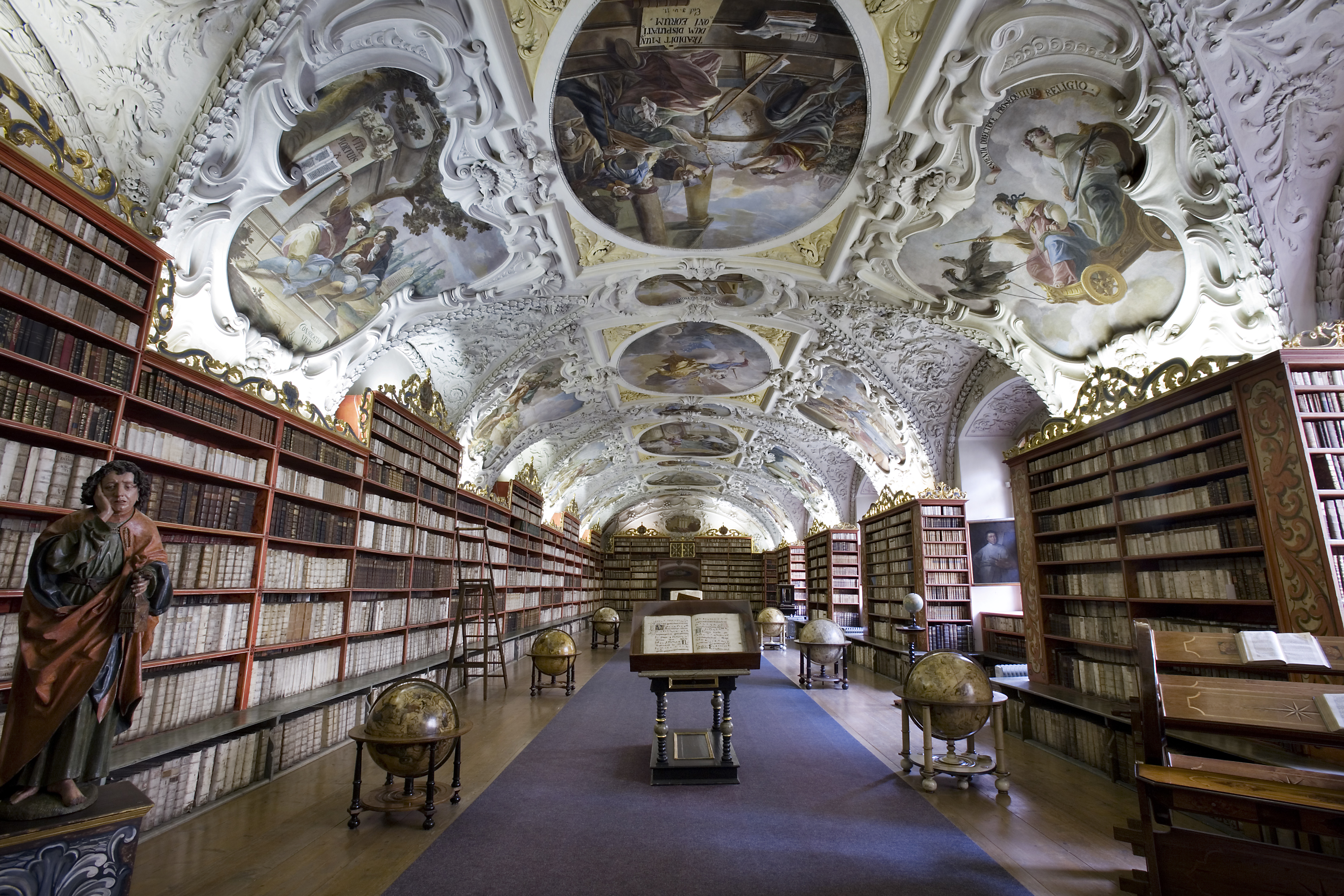
The Strahov Library

Czech literature (Czech: Česká literatura) can refer to literature written in Czech, in the Czech Republic (formerly Czechoslovakia, earlier the Lands of the Bohemian Crown), or by Czech people. Most literature in the Czech Republic is now written in Czech, but historically, a considerable part of Czech literary output was written in other languages as well, including Latin and German.

== Middle Latin works ==
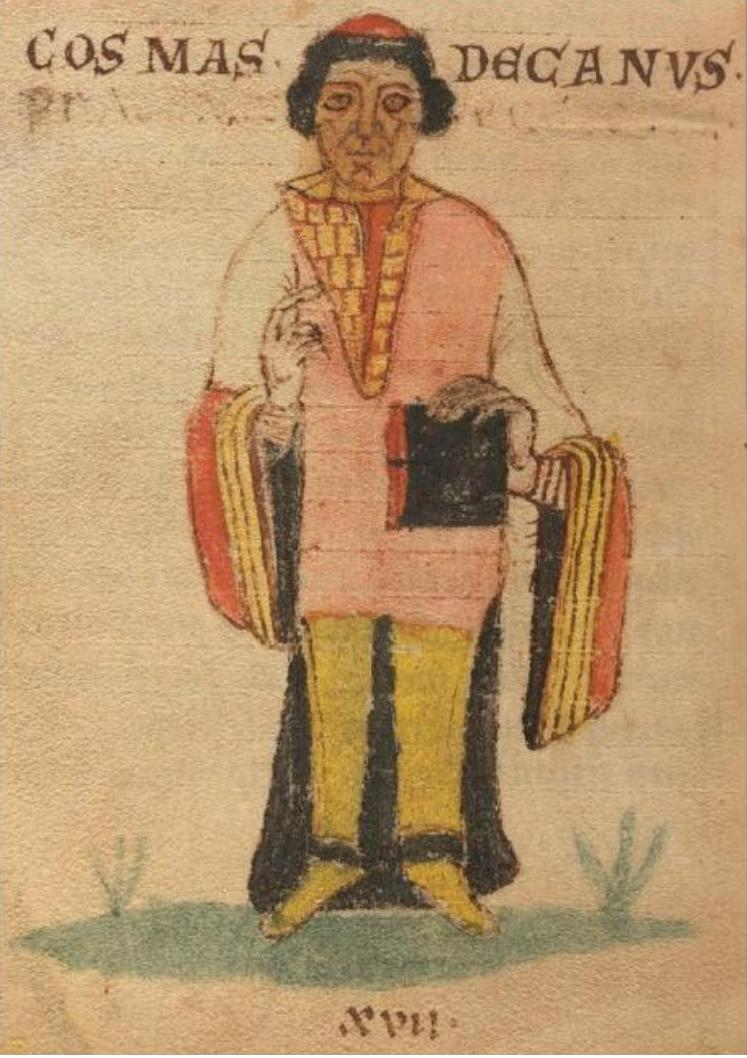
A writer and historian Cosmas

Bohemia was Christianized in the late 9th to 10th centuries, and the earliest written works associated with the kingdom of Bohemia are Middle Latin works written in the 12th to 13th centuries (with the exception of the Latin Legend of Christian, supposedly of the 10th century but of dubious authenticity). The majority of works from this period are chronicles and hagiographies. Bohemian hagiographies focus exclusively on Bohemian saints (Sts. Ludmila, Wenceslas, Procopius, Cyril and Methodius, and Adalbert), although numerous legends about Bohemian saints were also written by foreign authors. The most important chronicle of the period is the Chronica Boemorum (Bohemian Chronicle) by Cosmas, though it does approach its topics with then-contemporary politics in mind, and attempts to legitimize the ruling dynasty. Cosmas' work was updated and extended by several authors in the latter part of the 12th and during the 13th centuries.

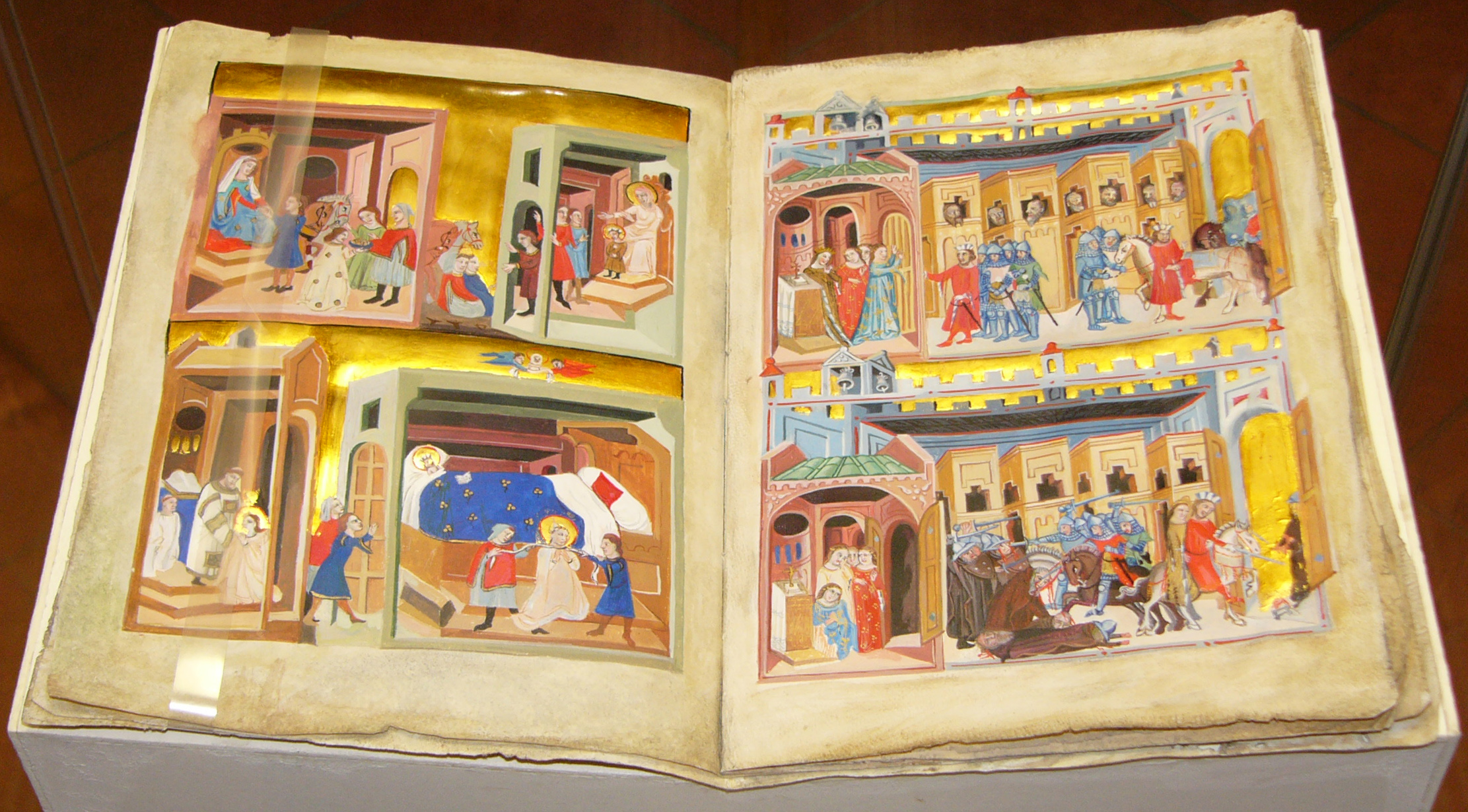
Chronicle of Dalimil

During the first part of the 13th century, the Přemyslid rulers of Bohemia expanded their political and economic influence westward and came into contact with the political and cultural kingdoms of Western Europe. This cultural exchange was evident in literature through the introduction of German courtly poetry, or Minnesang, in the latter part of the 13th century. After the murder of Wenceslas III and the subsequent upheavals in the kingdom in 1306, however, the Bohemian nobles distanced themselves from German culture and looked for literature in their native language. Despite this, German remained an important literary language in Bohemia until the 19th century. This new literature in Czech consisted largely of epic poetry of two types: the legend and the knightly epic, both based on apocryphal tales from the Bible, as well as hagiographic legends of earlier periods. Prose was also first developed during this period: administrative and instructional texts, which necessitated the development of a more extensive and specialized vocabulary; the first Czech-Latin dictionaries date from this time. Extensive chronicles, of which the Chronicle of Dalimil and Chronicon Aulae Regiae (the Zbraslav Chronicle) are the most striking examples, and artistic prose (e.g. Smil Flaška z Pardubic and Johannes von Saaz) were also written.

== Reformation ==
The Hussite revolution of the 15th century created a definite break in the literary evolution of Czech literature and forms its own separate history within Czech literature. The main aim of this literature was to communicate and argue for a specific religious doctrine and its form was generally prose. Jan Hus theological writing first appears at the beginning of the 15th century; he wrote first in Latin, later in Czech, and this divide remained for much of the later period: poetry and intellectual prose used primarily Latin, whereas popular prose was written in Czech or German. Hus writings center on technical, theological questions; however, he did publish a set of his Czech sermons and created rules of orthography and grammar that would be used to create the foundations of modern Czech in the 17th and 18th centuries. Only fragments remain of the literary works of the radical Taborite faction – these were generally Latin apologia defending the Taborite doctrine (Mikuláš Biskupec z Pelhřimova, Petr Chelčický). In general, Hussite writings differed from the preceding era by their focus on social questions – their audience consisted of the lower and lower middle classes. Works defending Catholicism and attacking the Hussite utraquists were also written, one example being Jan Rokycana's works. The Hussite period also developed the genre of Czech religious songs as a replacement for Latin hymns and liturgy, e.g. the Jistebnický kancionál, the Jistebnice Hymnal.

After the election of George of Poděbrady to the Czech throne following the Hussite wars, a new cultural wave swept into Bohemia. Humanism saw in the classics of antiquity an ideal for literature and culture. The main feature of the literature of this period is the competition between Catholics writing in Latin, e.g. Bohuslav Hasištejnský z Lobkovic and Jan Dubravius) and Protestants writing in Czech, e.g. Viktorin Kornel of Všehrdy and Václav Hájek. New literary devices incited scholars, e.g. Veleslavín, to construct a more complex grammatical structure, based on Latin, as well as an influx of loan words. Gutenberg's printing press rendered books and pamphlets more accessible, which slowly changed literature's status in society.

== Baroque period ==
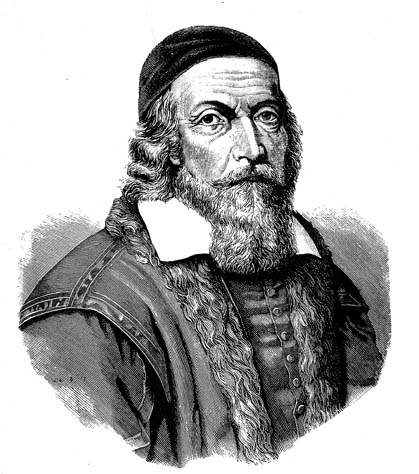
John Amos Comenius

The demise of the Czech Protestants after the Battle of the White Mountain decidedly affected Czech literary development. The forceful re-Catholicisation and Germanisation of Bohemia and the ensuing confiscations and expulsions virtually eliminated the Protestant middle classes and split the literature into two parts: the domestic Catholic and the émigré Protestant branches. Unlike in other European countries of the time, the nobility in Bohemia was not a part of the literary audience and thus this split of literary effort led to a certain lack of development and stagnation of Czech Baroque literature in comparison to other European countries of the time, especially in genres that were written for noble courts. The largest personality of Czech evangelical baroque writing is John Amos Comenius, who spent his youth in Bohemia but was forced into exile later in life. He was a pedagogue, theologian, reformer of education, and philosopher; his works include grammars, theoretical tracts on education, and works on theology. With his death in the late 17th century, Protestant literature in Czech virtually disappeared. Catholic baroque works span two types: religious poetry such as that of Adam Michna z Otradovic, Fridrich Bridel and Václav Jan Rosa, and religious prose writings (i.e. homiletic prose and hagiographies), and historical accounts (Bohuslav Balbín), as well as the Jesuit St. Wenceslaus Bible.

== The Enlightenment ==
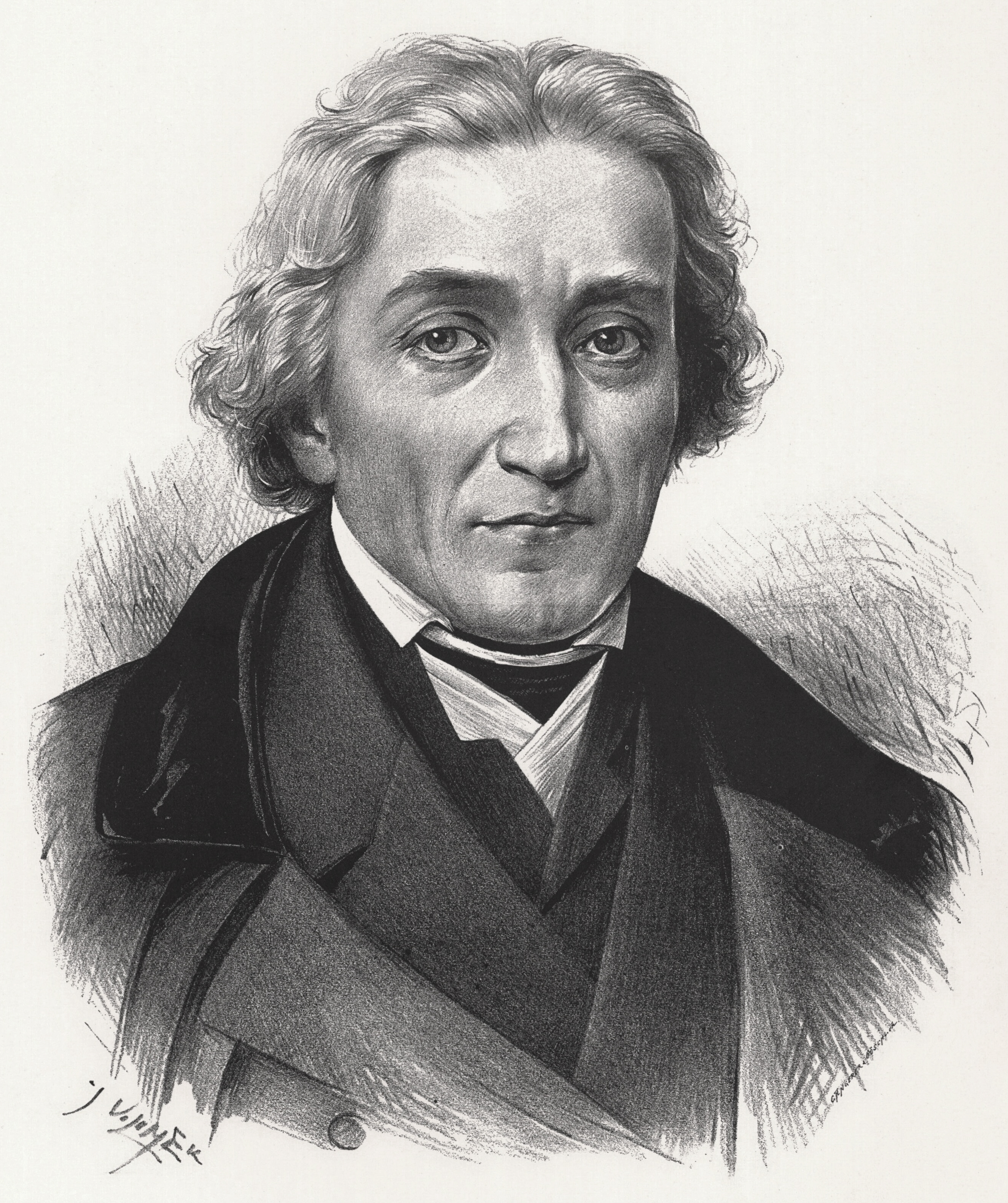
Josef Dobrovský

At the end of the 18th century, the Bohemian lands underwent a considerable change – the Habsburg emperor Josef II put an end to the feudal system and supported a new religious and ideological tolerance. Enlightened classicism emerged, which sought to apply the principles of rational science to all aspects of daily life. A national culture and literature in one's own national language began to be seen as a prerequisite for the unification of a nation. In literature, this constituted a renewed interest in prose novels (e.g. Václav Matěj Kramerius), in Czech history and in the historical development of Czech culture (e.g. Josef Dobrovský, who re-codified the grammar of Czech and Antonín Jaroslav Puchmayer, who systematically set out to develop a Czech poetic style). The literary audience evolved from priests and monks to the laity and general public and literature began to be seen as a vehicle of artistic expression. Bohemia and Moravia, however, remained within the sphere of Austrian and German cultural influence. The new national literature thus firstly mimicked popular German genres and would only later evolve into an independent creative effort; this was especially true for drama, e.g. Václav Kliment Klicpera.

== 19th century ==
Pre-romanticism formed the transition between enlightened classicism and romanticism – the pre-romantics did not completely abandon the emphasis on poetic forms drawn from antiquity, but relaxed the strict separation between the genres and turned away from didactic genres toward more lyric, folk-inspired works (e.g. Ján Kollár and František Čelakovský). It was during this period that the idea of a truly national literature and culture developed, as a rejection of Bernard Bolzano's vision of a bilingual and bicultural Czech-German state. The perhaps greatest figure of this era is Josef Jungmann, who translated many classics of world literature and spent his life establishing Czech literature as a serious, rich literature capable of great development. František Palacký and Pavel Jozef Šafárik took up the challenge of reexamining Czech history. As part of the effort to establish a pedigree for Czech literature and culture, Czech historians of the time sought evidence of heroic epics of the Middle Ages. They appeared to find such evidence in the Rukopis královédvorský and Rukopis zelenohorský (the Dvůr Králové Manuscript and the Zelená Hora Manuscript, respectively), although both were later proven forgeries.

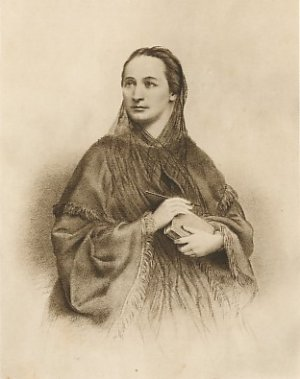
Božena Němcová, whose Babička (The Grandmother) is considered a classic of Czech Literature

By the 1830s, the foundations of Czech literature were laid and authors now began to focus more on the artistic merits of their work and less on developing the idea of Czech literature and culture as a whole. During this time period two main types of literature were produced: Biedermeier literature, which strove to educate the readers and encourage them to be loyal to the Austro-Hungarian Empire (e.g. Karel Jaromír Erben and Božena Němcová), and romanticism, which emphasized the freedom of the individual and focused on subjectivity and the subconscious (e.g. Karel Hynek Mácha, Václav Bolemír Nebeský.) These authors were generally published in either newspapers or in the literary magazine Květy (Blossoms) published by Josef Kajetán Tyl.

The year 1848 brought to the fore a new generation of Czech authors who followed in the footsteps of Mácha, and published their work in the new almanac Máj (May) (e.g. Vítězslav Hálek, Karolina Světlá and Jan Neruda). These authors rejected the narrow ideal of a purely national culture and favored one that incorporated Czech literature into European culture and drew inspiration from the progress made outside of the Czech lands. Their work, however, also commented on the encroachment of industrialization and focused increasingly on the simple life as opposed to the unfettered romantic ideal.

The May generation was followed by the neo-romantics, who continued in the romantic tradition, but also incorporated more contemporary styles: realism, Symbolism, and decadence. Three periods are apparent: the first reacted to the disappointment due to the lack of political and social progress during the 1870s (e.g. Václav Šolc); the second was the great return to poetry, especially epic poetry (e.g. Josef Václav Sládek); and the third focused on prose (e.g. Alois Jirásek).

In conversation with the neo-romantics, the next generation of authors leaned toward realism and naturalism, the ordinary and banal. They favored contemporary subjects over historical ones, and sought to deemphasize the personal voice of the author in comparison to the often highly colored speech of the characters. Two main topics were of interest: the exploration of the Czech village and the extent to which it remained an oasis of good morals (Jan Herben, Karel Václav Rais, Alois Mrštík); and Prague, especially the life of the lower classes (Ignát Herrman, Karel Matěj Čapek Chod).

The last literary generation of the 19th century signaled a decided break with the past and the advent of modernism – after the wave of optimism in the wake of the French Revolution at the beginning of the century, the lack of progress in implementing these ideals of freedom and brotherhood led to both a skepticism toward the possibility of ever achieving these ideals, and renewed efforts to do so. The common link between authors of this generation is their adherence to a particular style over their own voices, and their often very critical perspectives on the work of the previous generations. The modernists also inaugurated the cult of the artist, and this period saw the birth of the literary critic as an independent profession, as an ally of the artist, helping to both define and present work to the public (František Xaver Šalda). Notable poets of this period drew on the works and translations of the poet Jaroslav Vrchlický and include, among others, Josef Svatopluk Machar, Antonín Sova, Otokar Březina, and Karel Hlaváček); prose authors include Vilém Mrštík, Růžena Svobodová, and Josef Karel Šlejhar.

== 20th century ==
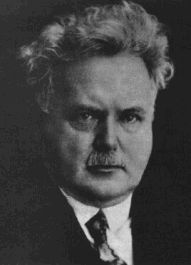
Viktor Dyk was a Czech poet, playwright and writer

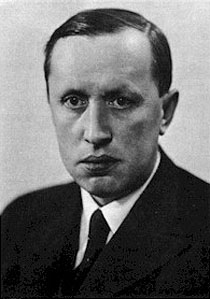
Karel Čapek's play R.U.R. introduced for the first time to the world the word robot

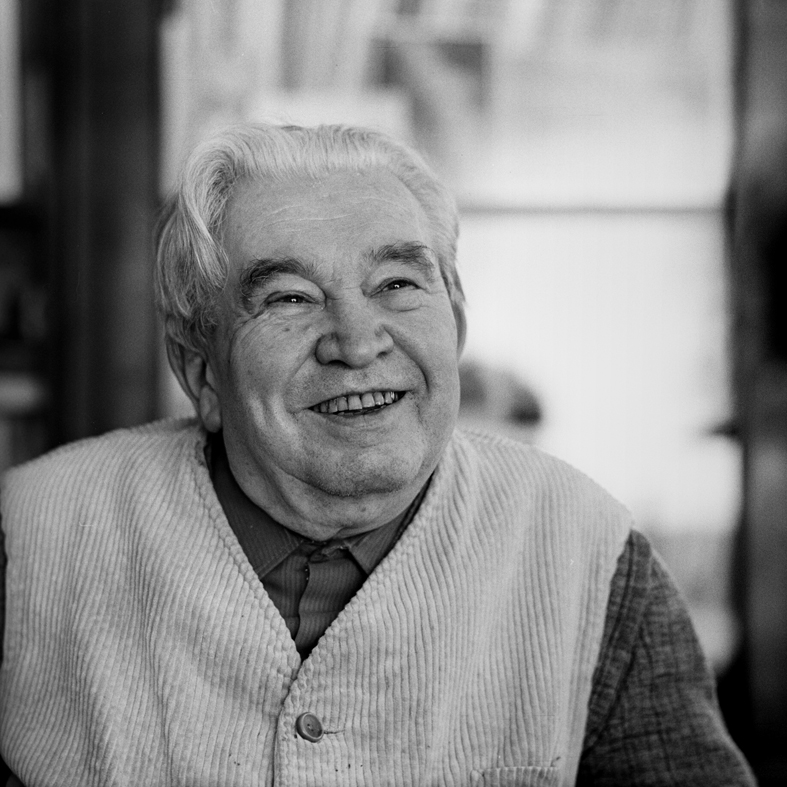
Jaroslav Seifert was the only Czech writer awarded the Nobel Prize in Literature

The turn of the 20th century marked a profound shift in Czech literature — after nearly a century of work, literature finally freed itself from the confines of needing to educate and serve the nation and spread Czech culture, and became literature simply for the sake of art. The orientation toward France, Northern Europe, and Russia intensified, and new demands were laid on the cultural knowledge of authors and their audience.

The new generation of poets distanced themselves from both the neo-romantics and the modernists: led by S. K. Neumann, their work focused on concrete reality, free of any pathos, or complicated symbolism. Many of the new poets (Karel Toman, Fráňa Šrámek, Viktor Dyk, František Gellner, Petr Bezruč) allied themselves with anarchism and the women's movement, although this influence waned throughout the decade. In prose, the work of the modernist generation was only now coming into its own, but the different stylistic waves that affected their prose are also evident in the work of the new generation — naturalism (A. M. Tilschová); impressionism (Šrámek, Gellner, Jiří Mahen, Jan Opolský, Rudolf Těsnohlídek); the Vienna Secession (Růžena Svobodová, Jiří Karásek ze Lvovic).

After their rebellious first decade, the new generation of poets (Toman, Neumann, Šrámek) turned toward nature and life in their work. This decade also marked the return of Catholic authors (Josef Florian, Jakub Deml, Jaroslav Durych, Josef Váchal) and the first entrance of the avant-garde into Czech literature, seeking to document the rapid changes in society and modernization. The first avantgarde style was neoclassicism, which soon gave way to cubism, futurism, and civilism (S. K. Neumann, the young brothers Čapek).

World War I brought with it a wave of repression of the newly emergent Czech culture, and this meant a return to the past, to traditional Czech values and history: the Hussites and the Awakening. The war, however, also precipitated a crisis of values, of faith in progress, religion, and belief, which found outlet in expressionism (Ladislav Klíma, Jakub Deml, Richard Weiner), civilism (Čapek brothers) and visions of a universal brotherhood of mankind (Ivan Olbracht, Karel Matěj Čapek Chod, F. X. Šalda).

The interwar period, coinciding with the First Republic, is one of the apogees of Czech literature — the new state brought with it a plurality of thinking, religion, and philosophy, leading to a great flowering of literature and culture. The first major theme of the interwar period was the war — the inhumanity, violence, and terror, but also the heroic actions of the Czech Legion (Rudolf Medek, Josef Kopta, František Langer, Jaroslav Hašek). An antiwar comedy novel The Good Soldier Švejk by Jaroslav Hašek is the most translated novel of the Czech literature (58 languages as of 2013).

A new generation of poets ushered in the return of the avantgarde: poetry of the heart (early Jiří Wolker, Zdeněk Kalista) and naivism (Čapek brothers, Josef Hora, Jaroslav Seifert, and S. K. Neumann). The avantgarde soon split, however, into the radical proletarian socialist and communist authors (Wolker, Neumann, Karel Teige, Antonín Matěj Píša, Hora, Jindřich Hořejší), the Catholics (Durych, Deml), and to the centrists (brothers Čapek, Dyk, Fischer, Šrámek, Langer, Jan Herben). A specifically Czech literary style, poetism, was developed by the group Devětsil (Vítězslav Nezval, Jaroslav Seifert, Konstantin Biebl, Karel Teige), which argued that poetry should pervade everyday life, that poetry is inseparable from daily life, that everyone is a poet. Prose of the interwar period distanced itself even more from the traditional, single perspective prose of the previous century, in favor of multiple perspectives, subjectivity, and fractured narratives. Utopian and fantastic literature came into the forefront (Jan Weiss, Karel Čapek, Eduard Bass, Jiří Haussmann), as well as the genres of documentary prose, which sought to paint as accurate a picture of the world as possible (Karel Čapek, Egon Erwin Kisch, Jiří Weil, Rudolf Těsnohlídek, Eduard Bass, Jaromír John, Karel Poláček); lyrical, imaginative prose that allied itself with the poetic poetry of the time (Karel Konrád, Jaroslav Jan Paulík, Vladislav Vančura); and Catholically-oriented prose (Jaroslav Durych, Jan Čep, Jakub Deml). The drama of the time also followed the same stylistic evolution as poetry and prose — expressionism, followed by a return to realistic, civilian theater (František Langer, Karel Čapek). Along with avantgarde poetry, avantgarde theater also flourished, focusing on removing the barriers between actors and audience, breaking the illusion of the unity of a theatrical work (Osvobozené divadlo, Jiří Voskovec and Jan Werich).

After the heady optimism of the 1920s, the 1930s brought with them an economic crisis, which helped spur a political crisis: both the left (Communist) and right (anti-German and fascist) parties radicalized and threatened the stability of the democracy. This led the authors of the time to focus on public matters and spirituality; Catholicism gained in importance (Kalista, Karel Schulz, Halas, Vančura, Durych). Changes were apparent first in poetry: the new generation of poets (Bohuslav Reynek, Vilém Závada, František Halas, Vladimír Holan, Jan Zahradníček) began as poets, but their work is much darker, full of images of death and fear. The older avantgarde (Teige, Nezval) also turned away from poetism to surrealism, and a third group (Hora, Seifert, František Hrubín) turned instead to lyricism, to quiet, memory-filled poetry. Prose, after the years of realistic journalism, turned to epics, existential novels, and subjective perspectives. Folk-inspired ballads (Josef Čapek, K. Čapek, Vančura, Ivan Olbracht), social-themed novels (Olbracht, Vančura, Poláček, Marie Majerová, Marie Pujmanová), and psychological novels (Jarmila Glazarová, Egon Hostovský, Jaroslav Havlíček) appeared. During this period, Karel Čapek wrote his most politically charged (and well-known) plays in response to the rise of fascist dictators. After the Munich Agreement in 1938, literature once more mirrored the current political present and called for national solidarity and a return to the past.

The German protectorate and World War II left its mark on Czech literature — many of the authors of the interwar generations did not survive or went into exile. During 1938–1940, society was still relatively free, but during 1941, most of the free newspapers, magazines, and publishers were shut down, and authors were silenced. WWII thus marks the origin of the 3-way split of literature that continued throughout the socialist years until 1989: domestic published, domestic illegal, and exile literature. As a result of the war, all forms of literature turned even more toward tradition and history: poetry became more subdued, and greater emphasis was laid upon language as an expression of national identity (Hora, Halas, Seifert, Nezval), and on spirituality and religious values (Hrubín, Závada, Zahradníček, Holan). The same occurred in prose: gone were the experimental works of the interwar period, but the social and psychological novel (Václav Řezáč, Vladimír Neff, Miloš Václav Kratochvíl) remained. The historical novel marked a new resurgence (Kratochvíl, Vančura, Durych, Schulz) as a way to write about the present while cloaking it in historical novels, as did prose inspired by folk tales and folk culture (Josef Štefan Kubín, Jan Drda, Vančura, Jaromír John, Zdeněk Jirotka). The generation of authors that debuted during the war and shortly afterwards (Jiří Orten, Group 42) all shared a similar harrowing experience of the war; their works all bear the hallmark of tragedy, existentialist thought, and the focus on the person as an isolated being.

One of the most ambitious mediators of Czech literature was Rudolf Fuchs (1890–1942). Through his numerous translations of Czech literature into German, he devoted his life to fostering understanding between Czech and German culture—ironically during times of immense political upheaval spanning both World Wars (1914–1942). The researcher Konstantin Kountouroyanis, based at Masaryk University in Brno, describes Fuchs as "an underestimated cultural intermediary and social critic in times of conflict" and considers his attempts at cultural mediation to be of lasting relevance and "instructive for the current generation". Fuchs maintained close correspondence with Petr Bezruč, František Bílek, Otokar Březina, Oscar Walter Cisek, Josef Čapek, Karel Čapek, Jaroslav Durych, Otokar Fischer, and Blažena Fischerová, among others, and translated works by Karel Jaromír Erben, František Ladislav Čelakovský, Jan Neruda, Jaroslav Vrchlický, Antonín Sova, Otokar Březina, Karel Hlaváček, Karel Toman, Stanislav Karel Neumann, Fráňa Šrámek, Otokar Theer, Otokar Fischer, Petr Křička, Jaroslav Durych, Josef Hora, Jiří Wolker, and Petr Bezruč. Fuchs’ efforts came to an abrupt end with his accidental death in exile in London in 1942. A manuscript titled "German Almanac from Czechoslovakia" remained unfinished in his estate.

Czech postwar literature is tightly intertwined with the political state of postwar Czechoslovakia; as during the war, literature broke apart into three main branches: domestic published, domestic illegal, and exile literature. Literature under the communist regime became the refuge of freedom and democracy, and literary works and authors were valued not only for their literary merits, but also for their struggle against the regime. The literature of the entire postwar period thus enjoyed great attention, despite its often precarious position. During the first three years after the end of the war (1945–1948), however, literature maintained a certain degree of freedom, although the strengthening of the extreme left gradually pushed out of the public sphere first the Catholic authors (Deml, Durych, Čep, Zahradníček), then the moderate Communists.

1948 brought the ultimate victory of the Communists, and the subsequent end of civil freedoms — any literature contrary to the official perspective was banned and the authors persecuted. The official literary style became socialist realism and all avantgarde leanings were suppressed. Many authors went into exile — to Germany, the U.S., the Vatican. Of those that stayed, many chose to write in secret and remain unpublished (the surrealists (Zbyněk Havlíček, Karel Hynek), Holan, Zahradníček, Jiří Kolář, Josef Jedlička, Jan Hanč, Jiřina Hauková, Josef Škvorecký, Egon Bondy, Jan Zábrana, Bohumil Hrabal). Most of their works were published only during the 1960s and 1990s.

Only at the end of the 1950s did the tight censorial control begin to ease — some poets were allowed to publish again (Hrubín, Oldřich Mikulášek, Jan Skácel) and a new literary group formed around the magazine Květen, striving to break the hold of socialist realism (Miroslav Holub, Karel Šiktanc, Jiří Šotola). Prose lagged behind poetry for much of the period, with the exception of Edvard Valenta and Josef Škvorecký. Shorter works, such as the short story also became popular again.

The 1960s brought with them the beginnings of reform efforts in the Communist party, and the subsequent liberalization of literature and increasing prestige of authors. Beginning with 1964, literature began to broaden in scope beyond the officially approved style. In poetry, intimate lyricism became popular (Vladimír Holan), as well as epic poetry (Karel Šiktanc, Hrubín), and the realism of Group 42. In prose, new authors abandoned polemics about socialism and instead turned toward personal and civic morality (Jan Trefulka, Milan Kundera, Ivan Klíma, Pavel Kohout), the theme of war and occupation (Jiří Weil, Arnošt Lustig), especially the fate of Jews. Bohumil Hrabal became the most prominent of the contemporary prose authors, with his works full of colloquialisms and non-traditional narrative structures, and the absence of official moral frameworks. Toward the end of the decade, novels of disillusionment, skepticism, and a need to find one's place in the world and history begin to appear (Vaculík, M. Kundera, Hrubín), as do modern historical novels (Oldřich Daněk, Jiří Šotola, Vladimír Körner, Ota Filip). The 1960s also brought the debuts of a new generation of authors who grew up during the excesses of Stalinism, and thus had no ideals about world utopias — their works dealt not with changing the world, but with living in it: authenticity, responsibility both moral and literary. These included the poets Jiří Gruša, Josef Hanzlík, Antonín Brousek, Jiří Kuběna, and playwrights Ivan Vyskočil, Jiří Šlitr, Václav Havel, Milan Uhde, Josef Topol. The close of the reform years also saw a return to experiments: surrealism (Milan Nápravník, Vratislav Effenberger), nonsense poetry (Emanuel Frynta), experimental poetry (Josef Hiršal, Bohumila Grögerová, Emil Juliš), abstract poetry and dada (Ladislav Novák), gritty realistic prose (Jan Hanč, Vladimír Páral) and ornate, symbol filled fantasy (Věra Linhartová). The era of literary freedom and experiments, which reached its apogee during the Prague Spring of 1968, came to an abrupt end the same summer, with the Soviet invasion and subsequent "normalization."

Normalization reinstated the severe censorship of the 1950s, shut down most of the literary magazines and newspapers, and silenced authors who did not conform. More than ever before, literature split into the legal, illegal, and exile branches. Many authors fled to the U.S. and Canada (Josef Škvorecký), Germany (Peroutka), Austria (Kohout), France (M. Kundera), but they generally did not fare much better than their contemporaries in Czechoslovakia, largely due to the absence of a readership. Their works became better known only through translations. The work of experimental, avantgarde authors who continued to publish as "official" authors generally shrank in quality, conformed to the official dogma, although in comparison to the 1950s, the literature was less rigid, less wooden. On the border between official and unofficial literature stood authors of historical novels (Korner, Karel Michal), and well as Bohumil Hrabal and Ota Pavel. Seifert, Mikulášek, Skácel were all also barred from publishing; their work was published as samizdat, small underground presses that hand-published much of the work of the underground, illegal authors. Ludvík Vaculík, Jan Vladislav, and Václav Havel and Jan Lopatka organized the largest samizdat editions. It was many of these illegal authors who signed Charta 77 and were jailed for doing so. Samizdat literature again returned to Catholicism, to memoirs and diaries of daily life (Vaculík). Memory and history were also chief motifs of samizdat literature (Karel Šiktanc, Jiřina Hauková), as were brutally honest, factual testimonials of daily life (Ivan Martin Jirous). The new literary generation of the 1980s was marked by the need to rebel, to act outside of the bounds of society — their work draws on the war generation (Group 42), and is often brutal, aggressive, and vulgar (Jáchym Topol, Petr Placák, Zuzana Brabcová); postmodernism also influenced literature as a whole (Jiří Kratochvil, Daniela Hodrová).

The fall of communism in 1989 marked another break in Czech literature — plurality and freedom returned. The works of many of the illegal and exiled authors working under the communist regime were published for the first time (for instance Jan Křesadlo and Ivan Blatný) and many of them returned to public life and publishing. Although some critics would say that contemporary Czech literature (since 1989) is relatively marginalised in comparison with Czech film-making, writers such as Petr Šabach, Ivan Martin Jirous, Jáchym Topol, Miloš Urban, Patrik Ouředník, Petra Hůlová, Michal Viewegh and Kateřina Tučková are public figures and sell books in large numbers. Contemporary Czech poetry, in Petr Borkovec can boast a poet of European standing.

== Contemporary Czech authors ==
- Michal Ajvaz
- Jan Balabán
- Josef Formánek
- Ivan Martin Jirous
- Jiří Hájíček
- Emil Hakl
- Petra Hůlová
- Milan Kundera
- Patrik Ouředník
- Sylvie Richterová
- Jaroslav Rudiš
- Pavel Řezníček
- Petr Stančík
- Michal Šanda
- Jáchym Topol
- Miloš Urban
- Jaroslav Velinský
- Michal Viewegh
- Radka Denemarková
- Jaroslav Čejka (* 1943)
- Pavel Šrut

== Czech Literary Awards ==
- Jaroslav Seifert Prize
- Jiří Orten Award
- Magnesia Litera Prize

== See also ==
- Kafka (lived in Prague but wrote in German)
- Otto's encyclopedia
- Libri Prohibiti
- List of Glagolitic manuscripts
- List of libraries in the Czech Republic
- Czech science fiction and fantasy
