= Reynek =

Reynek may refer to:

== People ==
- Bohuslav Reynek, (1892-1971), Czech poet, writer, painter and translator
- Jiří Reynek, (1929–2014), Czech poet and graphic artist

== Other ==
- 59830 Reynek, main-belt asteroid
