= Lípa (Havlíčkův Brod District) =

Municipality in the Czech Republic

- Municipality
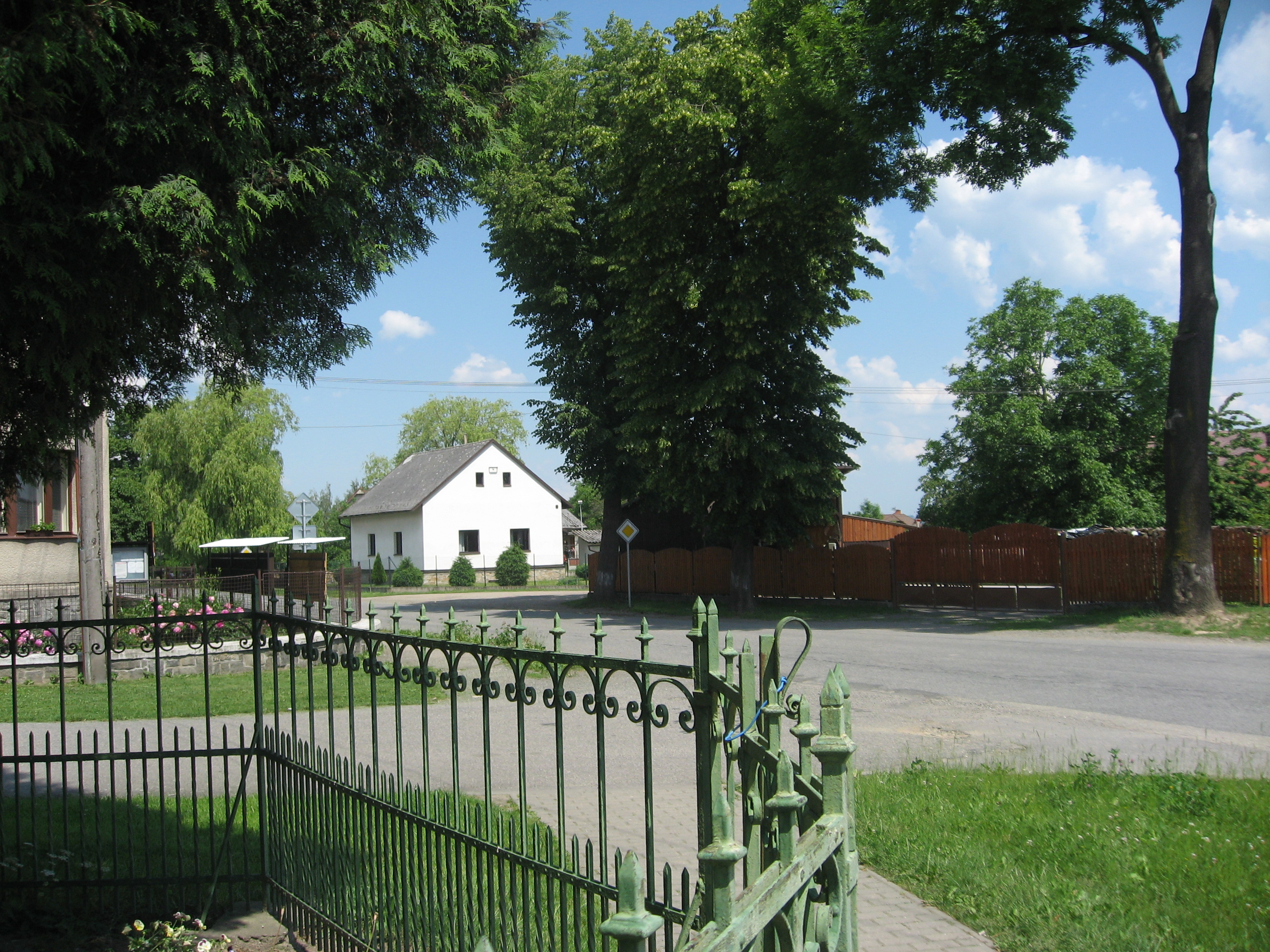
- Centre of Lípa

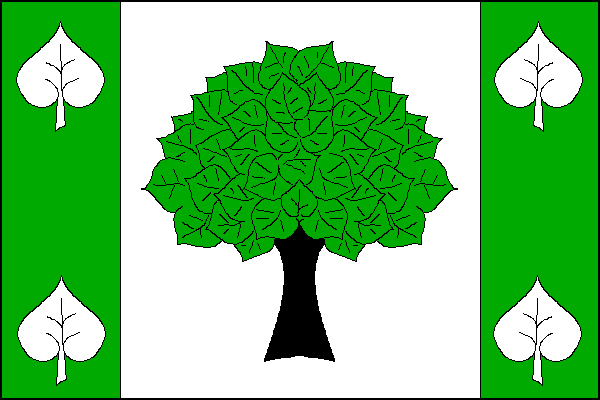
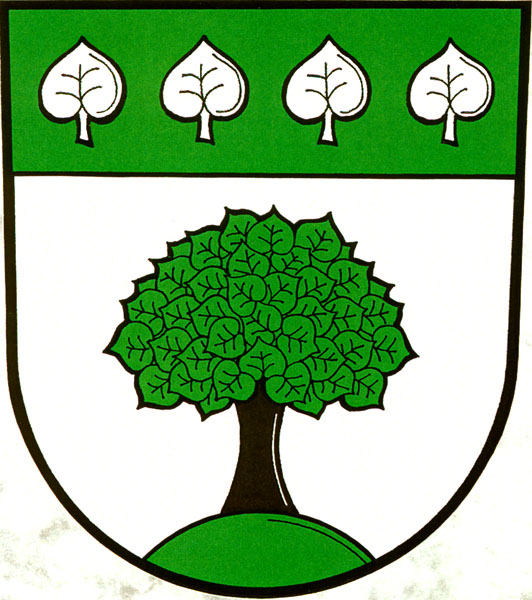
- Flag Coat of arms

- Location in the Czech Republic
- Coordinates: 49°33′15″N 15°32′41″E
- Country: Czech Republic
- Region: Vysočina
- District: Havlíčkův Brod
- First mentioned: 1351

Area
  - Total: 14.70 km^{2} (5.68 sq mi)
- Elevation: 505 m (1,657 ft)

Population (2026-01-01)
  - Total: 1,168
  - Density: 79.46/km^{2} (205.8/sq mi)
- Time zone: UTC+1 (CET)
  - Summer (DST): UTC+2 (CEST)
- Postal codes: 580 01, 582 53, 582 57
- Website: www.obec-lipa.cz

Lípa is a municipality and village in Havlíčkův Brod District in the Vysočina Region of the Czech Republic. It has about 1,200 inhabitants.

== Administrative division ==
Lípa consists of four municipal parts (in brackets population according to the 2021 census):

- Lípa (811)
- Chválkov (31)
- Dobrohostov (160)
- Petrkov (136)

== Etymology ==
In Czech, the name Lípa literally means 'linden'.

== Geography ==
Lípa is located about 6 kilometres (4 mi) south of Havlíčkův Brod and 17 km (11 mi) north of Jihlava. The northern part of the municipal territory lies in the Upper Sázava Hills and the southern part lies in the Křemešník Highlands. The highest point is at 599 m (1,965 ft) above sea level. The Žabinec Stream flows along the eastern municipal border.

== History ==
The first written mention of Lípa is from 1351.

== Demographics ==
Historical population

Year	Pop.	±%
1869	1,020	—
1880	1,099	+7.7%
1890	1,038	−5.6%
1900	1,078	+3.9%
1910	1,041	−3.4%

Year	Pop.	±%
1921	1,105	+6.1%
1930	1,119	+1.3%
1950	954	−14.7%
1961	1,027	+7.7%
1970	931	−9.3%

Year	Pop.	±%
1980	933	+0.2%
1991	900	−3.5%
2001	1,020	+13.3%
2011	1,084	+6.3%
2021	1,138	+5.0%

Source: Censuses

== Transport ==
Lípa is located on the railway line Havlíčkův Brod–Humpolec.

== Sights ==
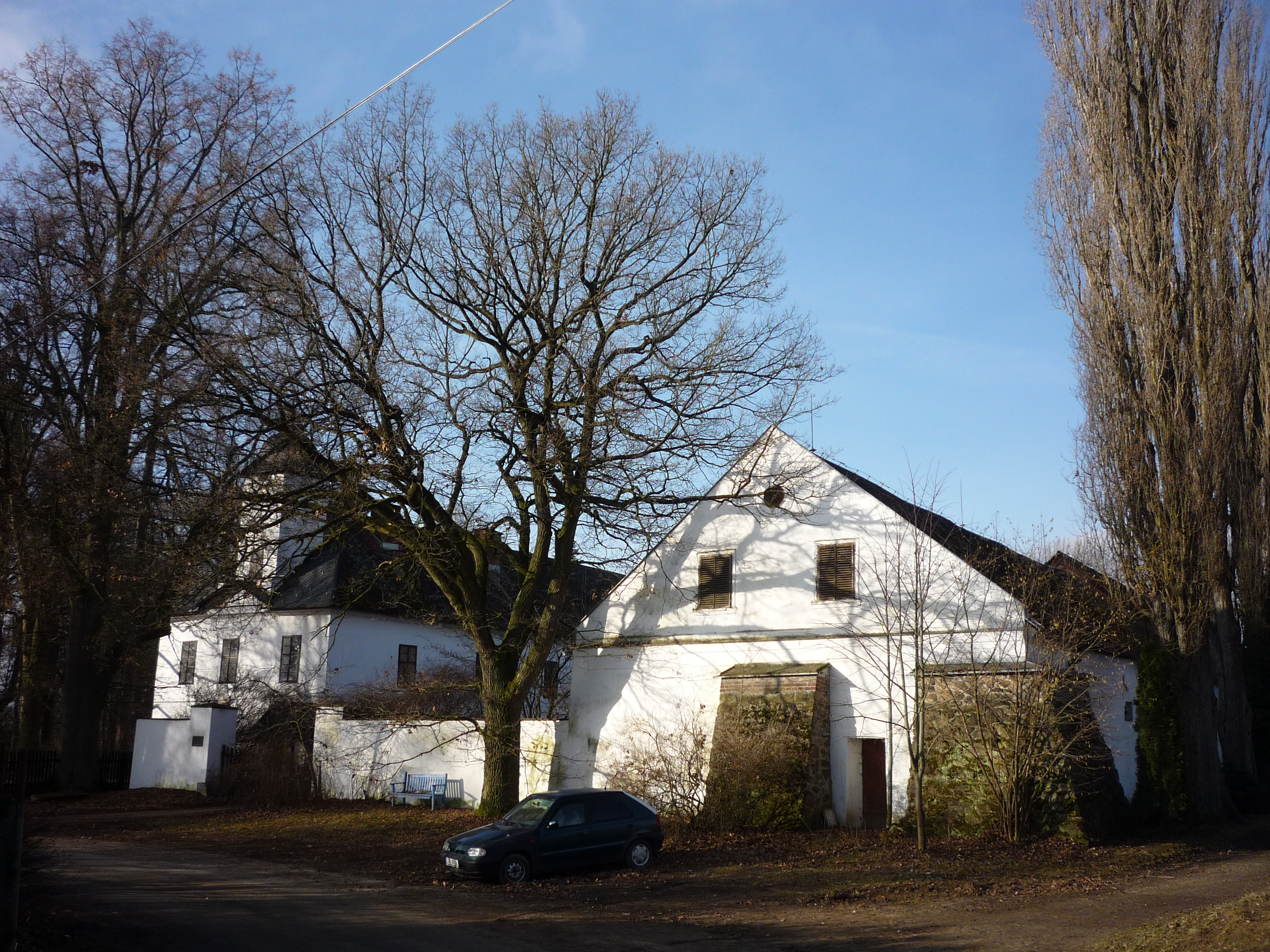
Petrkov Castle

The most valuable building is the small castle in Petrkov. It was originally a fortress, first documented in 1540, which was rebuilt in the first half of the 18th century. Bohuslav Reynek was born there. Today the Petrkov Castle houses the Czech-French Cultural Centre Petrkov, managed by the Memorial of National Literature. It was founded in honour of the work of Reynek and his French wife Suzanne Renaud.

The main landmark of the village of Lípa is a Marian column from 1760.

== Notable people ==
- Bohuslav Reynek (1892–1971), poet, writer, painter and translator
