= Jan Čep =

Czech writer

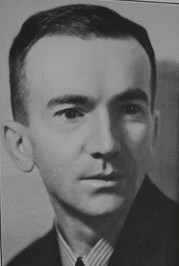
Jan Čep

Jan Čep (31 December 1902, Myslechovice – 25 January 1974, Paris) was a Czech writer and translator.

== Life ==
Čep was born in 1902 in the village of Myslechovice (now a part of Litovel), Moravia, to a family of peasants. After completing his studies at the Gymnasium in Litovel, from 1922 to 1926 he studied Czech, English and French linguistics at Prague University. In 1926, he joined Josef Florian's Christian community in Stará Říše and worked in its publishing house as a translator. After later having been seduced by Florian's elder sister, he returned to Prague and worked as a translator for the publishing houses Melantrich and Symposion. After the German occupation of Czechoslovakia, he returned to his native village and led a solitary life out of politics and public life. He only corresponded with his best friend, the poet Jan Zahradníček (their correspondence was published in the 1990s as a book) and made visits to a Dominican cloister in Olomouc to see his other friend, a monk, theologian and literature critic named Silvestr Maria Braito. After the end of World War II he returned to Prague and worked as an editor in the Vyšehrad publishing house.

After the communist takeover in 1948, Jan fled into exile and lived in France. His friends that stayed, such as Jan Zahradníček, were subjected to cruel persecution. The poet Zahradníček was sentenced to 13 years of prison for his "anti-socialistic thinking" and died a few weeks after being released from prison in the 1960s.

In exile, Jan Čep lived in Paris (1948-1951) and in Munich (1951-1954) where he became a commentator in the Czech section of Radio Free Europe. In 1954, he returned to Paris, married, and became an essayist and free journalist. He died in exile in 1974 in Paris.

== Books ==
- Dvojí domov (1926, Double Being), short stories
- Zeměžluč (1931, Centaury), short stories
- Letnice (1932, Pentecost), short stories
- Děravý plášť (1934, Perforated Cloak), short stories
- Hranice stínu (1935, Border of Shade), novel
- Modrá a zlatá (1938, Blue and Gold), short stories
- Polní tráva (1946, Field Grass)
- Rozptýlené paprsky (1946), essays
- Cikáni (1953, Gypsies), novel published in Munich exile
- O lidský svět (1953, Human World), essays published in Rome
- Samomluvy (1959) essays, published in Lund
- Sestra úzkost (1975, My Sister Fear), memoirs/essay, published in Rome
- Etudy pro paní J. (1986, Etudes for Mrs. J.), novel published posthumously in Munich

== See also ==
- List of Eastern Bloc defectors
