= Oselce =

- Municipality
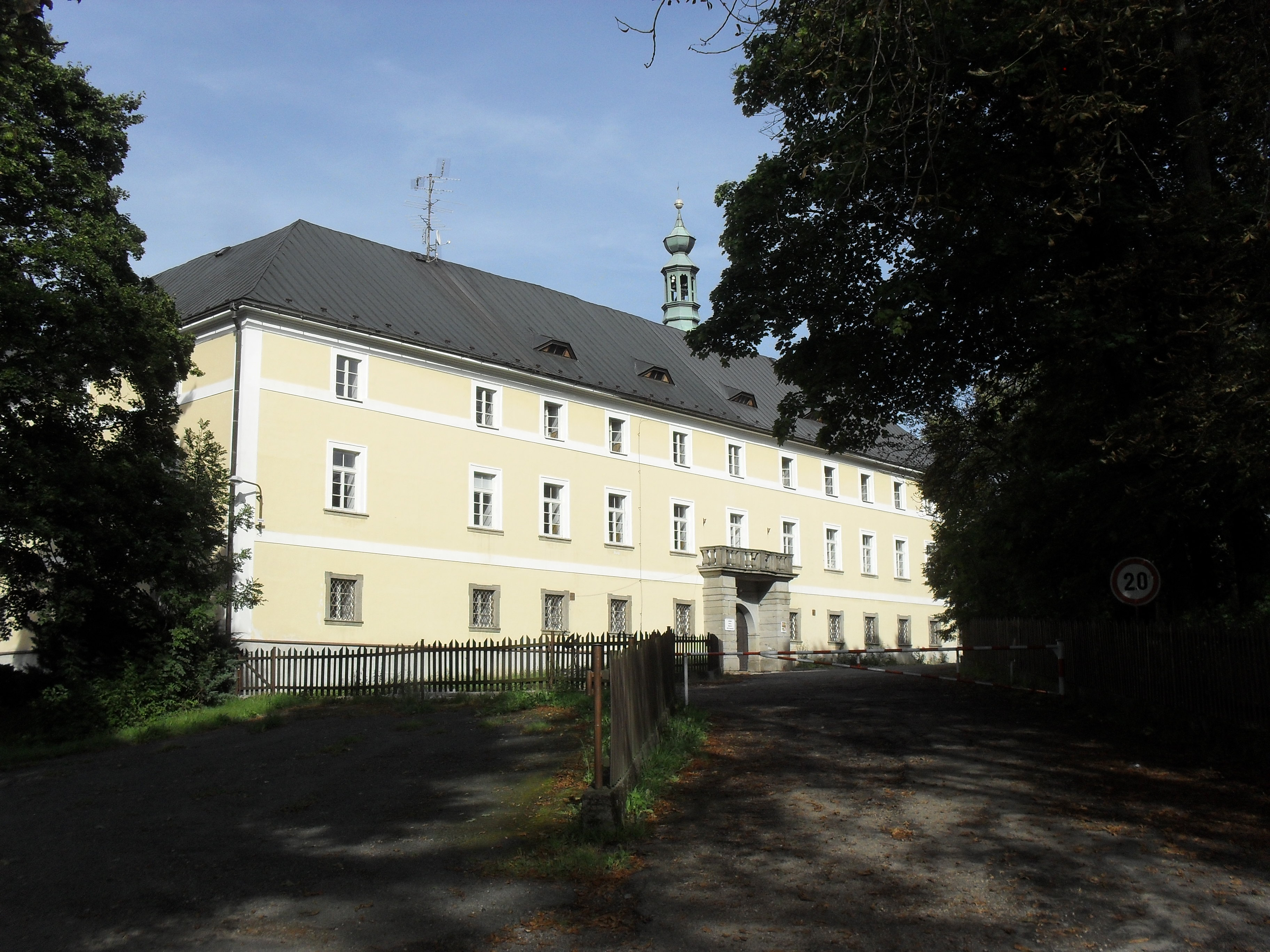
- Oselce Castle

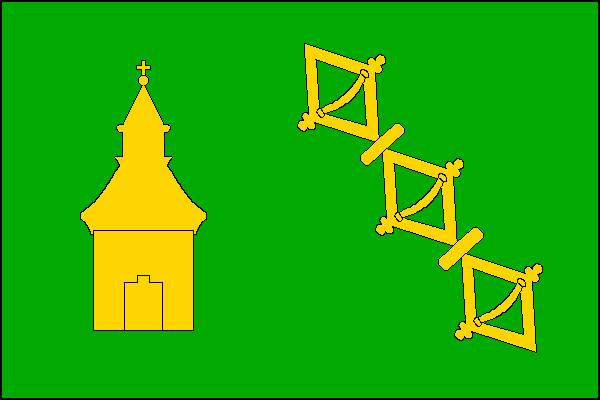
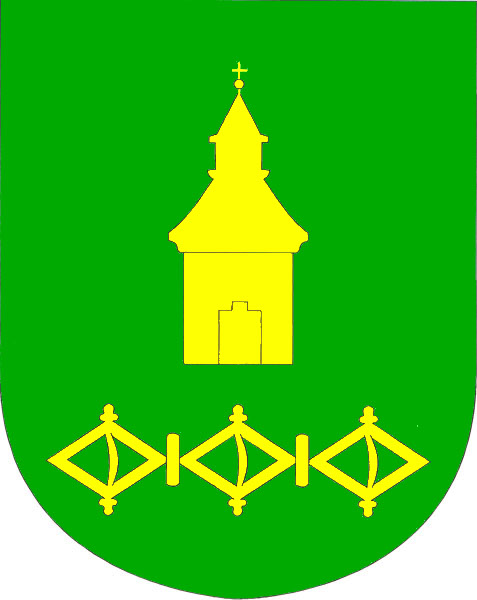
- Flag Coat of arms

- Location in the Czech Republic
- Coordinates: 49°26′14″N 13°40′22″E
- Country: Czech Republic
- Region: Plzeň
- District: Plzeň-South
- First mentioned: 1388

Area
  - Total: 14.78 km^{2} (5.71 sq mi)
- Elevation: 585 m (1,919 ft)

Population (2026-01-01)
  - Total: 356
  - Density: 24.1/km^{2} (62.4/sq mi)
- Time zone: UTC+1 (CET)
  - Summer (DST): UTC+2 (CEST)
- Postal codes: 335 01, 335 46
- Website: www.oselce.cz

Oselce (German: Wosseletz) is a municipality and village in Plzeň-South District in the Plzeň Region of the Czech Republic. It has about 400 inhabitants.

== Administrative division ==
Oselce consists of three municipal parts (in brackets population according to the 2021 census):

- Oselce (201)
- Kotouň (127)
- Nová Ves (17)

== Etymology ==
The word oselce is a plural form of oselec. Oselec is an old Czech diminutive form of osel, i.e. 'wild ass'.

== Geography ==
Oselce is located about 37 kilometres (23 mi) southeast of Plzeň. It lies in the Blatná Uplands. The highest point is a nameless hill at 662 m (2,172 ft) above sea level. The municipal territory is rich in fishponds, the largest of which is Široký rybník.

== History ==
The first written mention of Oselce is from 1388. The Knights of Oselce owned the village from 1388 until the 16th century. A fortress in Oselce was first documented in the mid-16th century, but it was probably older. From 1673 to 1805, Oselce was property of the Janovský of Janovice family.

The next notable owners of Oselce was the Booss-Waldeck family, who held the castle from 1832 to 1945. Oselce had the greatest fame at the time of their possession by Viktor Booss-Waldeck in 1887–1916, who was a patron of art and music. At that time, many celebrities were frequent guests at the castle, including Jaroslav Vrchlický, Oskar Nedbal, Josef Suk, Josef Svatopluk Machar, Josef Václav Sládek, Václav Talich and Karel Matěj Čapek-Chod.

== Demographics ==
Historical population

Year	Pop.	±%
1869	1,344	—
1880	1,443	+7.4%
1890	1,312	−9.1%
1900	1,227	−6.5%
1910	1,260	+2.7%

Year	Pop.	±%
1921	1,122	−11.0%
1930	1,045	−6.9%
1950	770	−26.3%
1961	745	−3.2%
1970	610	−18.1%

Year	Pop.	±%
1980	505	−17.2%
1991	406	−19.6%
2001	381	−6.2%
2011	341	−10.5%
2021	345	+1.2%

Source: Censuses

== Transport ==
The village of Kotouň is located on the railway line Blatná–Nepomuk.

== Education ==
There is a school that provides primary and secondary education in Oselce. The secondary school offers apprenticeships in blacksmithing, locksmithing, carpentry and vehicle and agricultural machinery repair.

== Sights ==
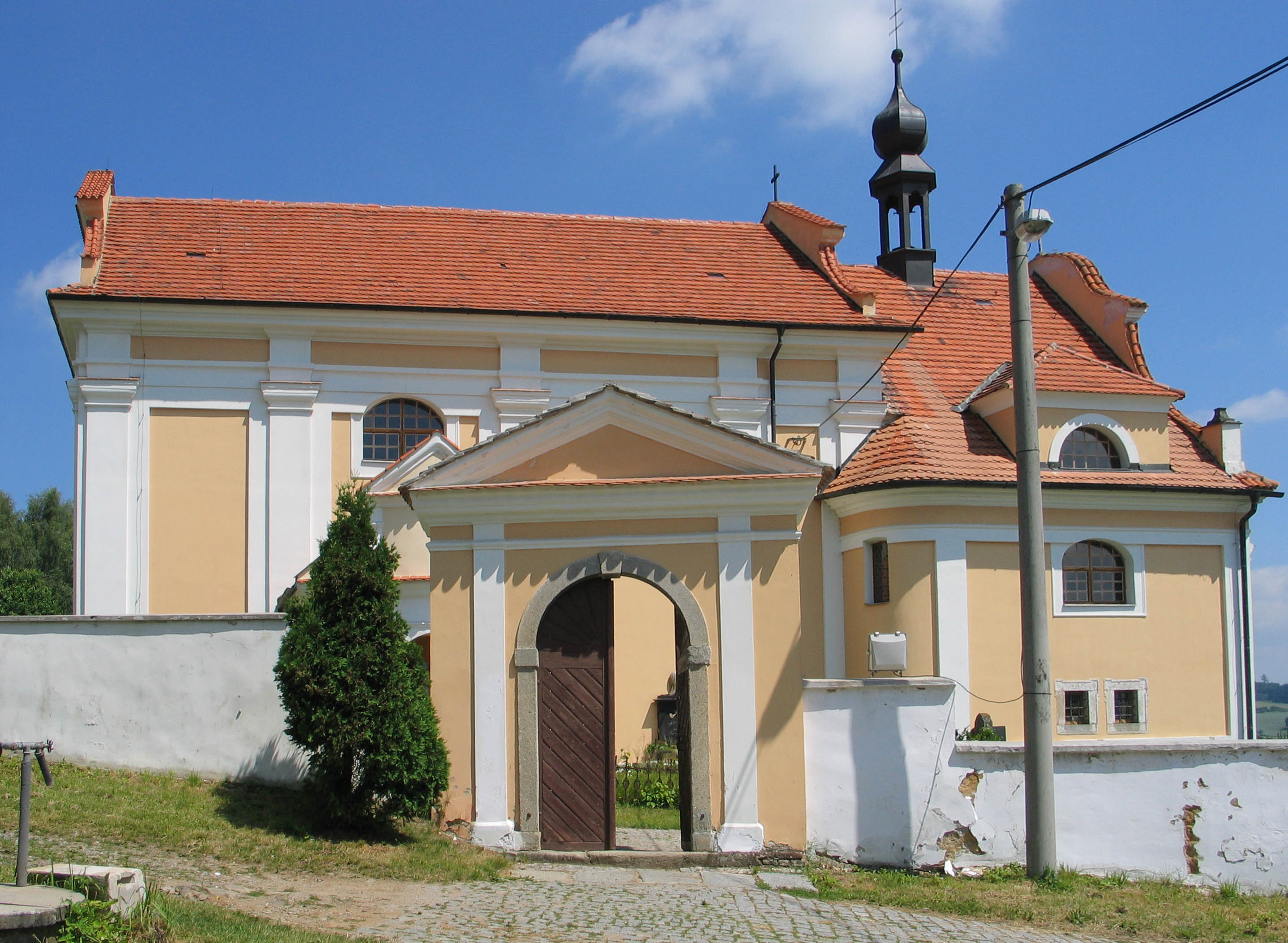
Church of the Assumption of the Virgin Mary in Kotouň

The Oselce Castle was built in the early Baroque style in 1680. It was built on the site of a medieval fortress, which was rebuilt in the Renaissance style. In 1707–1737, the castle was rebuilt by Giacomo Antonio de Maggi, and the castle chapel was added. In the basement of the castle chapel, there is a ceiling fresco of St. John of Nepomuk and Czech patrons from the first half of the 18th century. The castle is surrounded by an English-style park. There is a large Baroque one-story granary in the park. Today, the castle houses the school.

The parish Church of the Assumption of the Virgin Mary is the main landmark of the village of Kotouň. It was built by G. A. de Maggi in 1703–1705. It replaced an old church from 1475, destroyed by fire. The church complex is also formed by adjacent cemetery with a Baroque bell tower from 1696. Near the church, there is a valuable early Baroque building of the rectory, which dates from 1736.

The Chapel of Saint Margaret is located on Markétin vrch hill. This Baroque chapel dates from 1691.
