= Bohuslav Reynek =

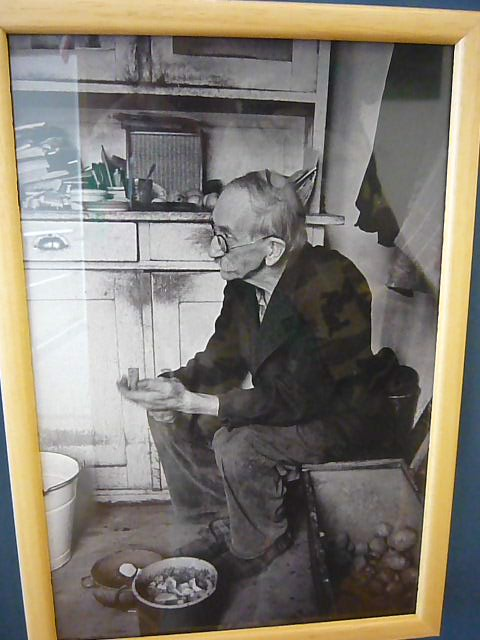
- Born: 31 May 1892; Petrkov, Austria-Hungary
- Died: 28 October 1971 (aged 79); Petrkov, Czechoslovakia
- Occupation: Poet
- Spouse: Suzanne Renaud
- Children: Daniel Reynek, Jiří Reynek

Signature
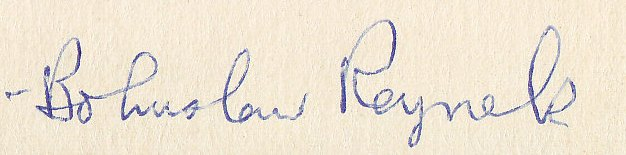

Bohuslav Reynek (31 May 1892 – 28 October 1971) was a Czech poet, writer, painter and translator.

== Education and personal life ==
Reynek was born on 31 May 1892 in Petrkov (today part of Lípa). From 1904 to 1911 Reynek studied at gymnasium in Jihlava, where he was influenced by his professor Max Eisler. There he learned both French and German. After a short time studying at Prague University, he went to Petrkov. In 1926 he married the French poet Suzanne Renaud, whose work he would later translate into Czech. In 1914, he started his long-time and close cooperation with Josef Florian in the town of Stará Říše translating, illustrating and publishing his own poetry. He and Suzanne had two sons, Daniel (1928–2014) and Jiří (1929–2014). In 1949 his farmstead was confiscated by the new Communist state (he and his family were allowed to live on in Petrkov), and the publishers that had heretofore published his work were closed down. He died on 28 October 1971 on his farmstead in Petrkov and was buried nearby in Svatý Kříž (part of Havlíčkův Brod) in the family grave.

== Poetry ==
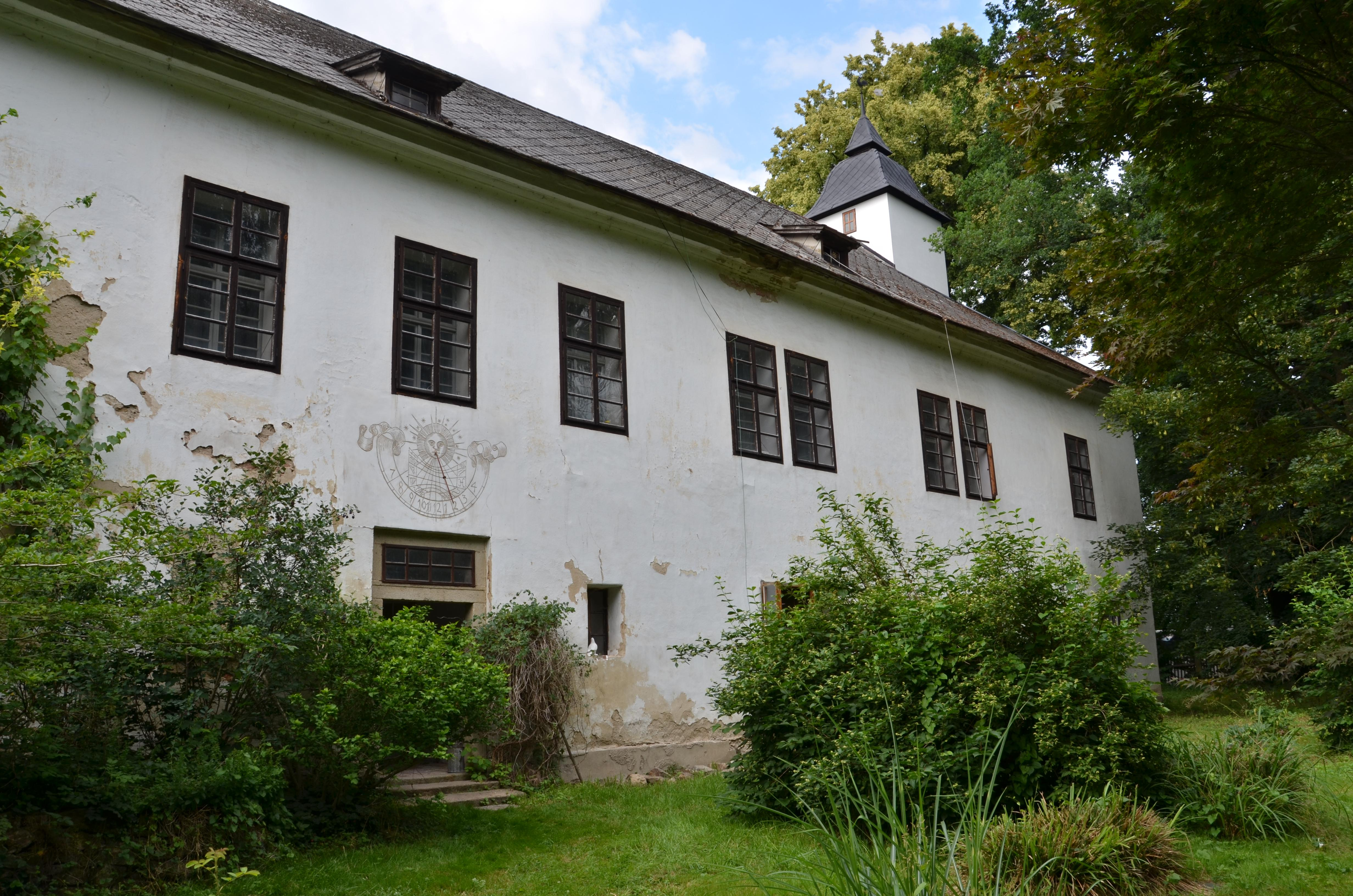
Farmstead of Bohuslav Reynek in Petrkov

His poems are meditative and inspired by the Czech landscape, rural life in the farmstead and deep Christian humanism. What is noteworthy is the delicate way in which religious themes are refracted through images of his immediate surroundings; the poems invest everyday objects and scenes (such as the farm animals, their byres, the rhythms of the working week) with a spiritual luminescence, a bright edge, and this is done so delicately that at no point does it feel imposed. He employs, for the most part, traditional forms, with inventive rhymes.

Reynek was a graphic artist and a translator of French and German. Among the poets he translated was the German expressionist Georg Trakl, and it is clear that he learnt much from Trakl's techniques.

After the Communist coup d'état of 1948, Reynek's farmstead was confiscated and devastated, his books were prohibited and those of public libraries liquidated because of Reynek's Christian faith. He died poor with his works banned but became a hero to young Czech poets of the 1960s and 1970s, the most prominent of which were Ivan Martin Jirous, Zbyněk Hejda and Ivan Diviš. His work was published in exile and after 1989 a critical edition of his poems was completed and edited by Torst Publishing House, Prague. The French author Sylvie Germain wrote Bohuslav Reynek à Petrkov (1998), a meditation on his life and art.

== Work ==
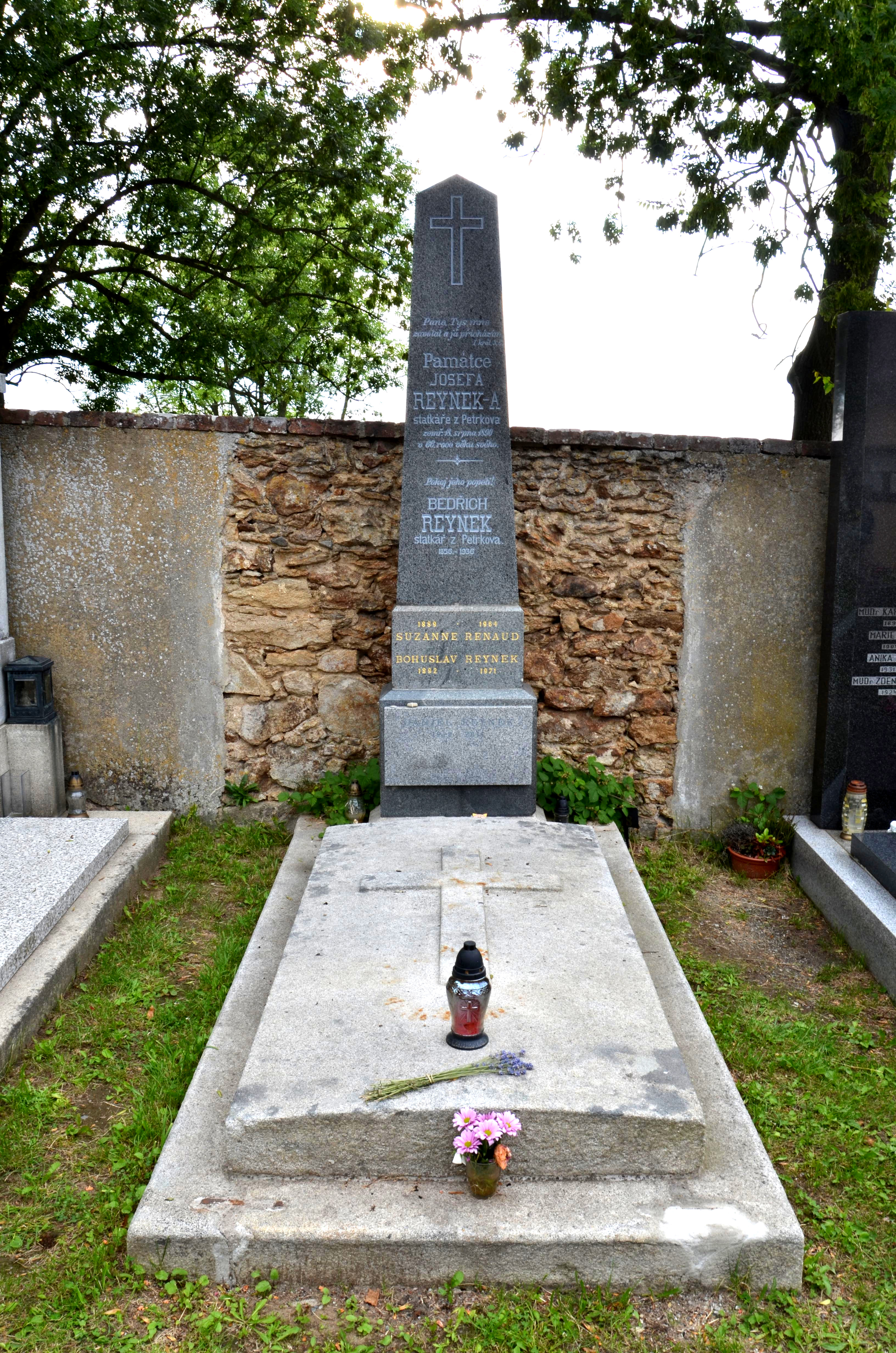
Grave of Bohuslav Reynek and his family at the cemetery in Svatý Kříž

- Žízně (Thirst) (1921), poems
- Rybí šupiny (Fish Scales) (1922), poems in prose
- Had na sněhu (Snake on the Snow) (1924), poems in prose
- Smutek země (Earth's Grief) (1924), poems
- Rty a zuby (Lip to Tooth) (1925), poems
- Setba samot (The Sowing of Solitude) (1936), poems
- Pieta (1940), poems
- Podzimní motýli (Fall's Butterflies) (1946), poems

posthumously:

- Odlet vlaštovek – samizdat (1978), in exile (Munich 1980), many editions after 1989.

selected poems:

- Vlídné vidiny, ed. Jaromír Zelenka (Odeon, 1992)

definitive edition of the poems:

- Básnické spisy (Poetic Works), ed. Marie Chlíbcová (Archa/Petrkov, 2009)

== Translations ==
English

- Bohuslav Reynek, Fish Scales, trans. Kelly Miller and Zdenka Brodská (Ann Arbor: Michigan Slavic Publications, 2001).
- Bohuslav Reynek, The Well at Morning: Selected Poems, 1925-1971 trans. Justin Quinn (University of Chicago Press/Charles University Press, 2017).
- Bohuslav Reynek, "Shadows," trans. Justin Quinn, New Yorker (2011).

French

- Bohuslav Reynek, Le serpent sur la neige, trans. Xavier Galmiche (Grenoble: Romarin-les Amis de Suzanne Renaud et Bohuslav Reynek, 1997). See the publishing house Romarin's catalogue.
