= Juliana Jirousová =

Czechoslovak painter (1943–2023)

- Born: Juliana Stritzková; 17 September 1943; Stará Říše, Protectorate of Bohemia and Moravia
- Died: 25 August 2023 (aged 79); Prostřední Vydří, Czech Republic
- Occupations: Painter, artist
- Spouse: Ivan Martin Jirous
- Children: Františka Jirousová; Marta Veselá Jirousová

Juliana Jirousová (17 September 1943 – 25 August 2023) was a Czech artist and painter, known for her paintings of Roman Catholic saints. Jirousová was an anti-Communist dissident during the communist era in Czechoslovakia and a signatory of Charter 77. Her former husband, poet Ivan Martin Jirous, was also a dissident and major figure in the underground movement during the Normalization period.

== Biography ==
Jirousová was born Juliana Stritzková in Stará Říše on 17 September 1943 to a strongly religious Catholic family. Her parents, Marie Stritzková-Florianová and Otto Maria Stritzko, were both artists and painters who passed on their artistic interests to their daughter. Jirousová's maternal grandfather, Josef Florian, was a prominent Catholic publisher and thinker. She graduated from secondary school in Telč in the early 1960s, but was not allowed to continue higher education due to political pressure from the communist authorities. In response, she worked in several jobs and began painting, leading to her career as an artist. One of her early jobs involved painting with psychiatric patients at a hospital in Havlíčkův Brod as a form of art therapy.

Jirousová moved to Prague for work, where she met Ivan Martin Jirous, a poet, dissident, and leading figure in the Prague underground movement, in 1972. Jirousová married Jirous in 1976 (his second marriage). The couple had two daughters, Františka Jirousová (born 1980), who became a novelist, and Františka Jirousová
Marta Veselá Jirousová (born 1981), a poet and teacher. Both Juliana Jirousová and her husband signed Charter 77 and she raised their daughters while he was imprisoned for anti-communist activities during the 1970s and 1980s. Jirousová was placed under surveillance by the secret police for much of this time. Their marriage ended soon after his release from prison. Jirous died in 2011.

Juliana Jirousová died on 25 August 2023, at the age of 79. Her funeral was held in Stará Říše.
