= Jaroslav Durych =

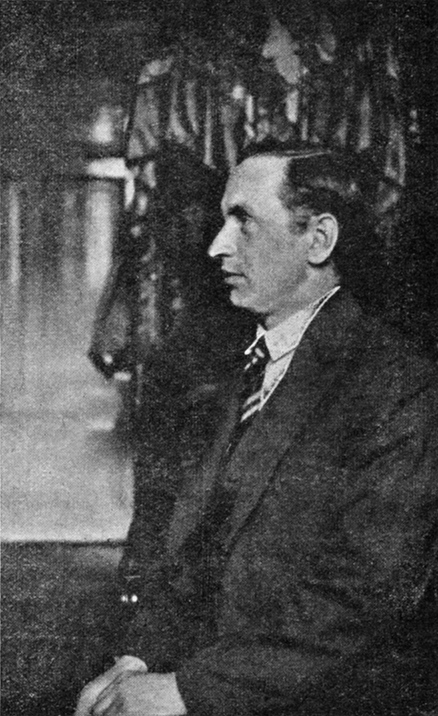
Jaroslav Durych

Jaroslav Durych (2 December 1886 – 7 April 1962) was a Czech prose writer, poet, playwright, journalist, and military surgeon.

== Life and works ==
Durych was born in Hradec Králové and was orphaned at an early age. He attended school at the Archbishop's convent in Příbram, but was expelled for reading forbidden literature. Later, he was able to attend medical school in Prague, thanks to a military scholarship, and graduated in 1913. After serving as a military doctor in Galicia during World War I, he established a private practice in Přerov. This proved to be an unsuccessful enterprise, however, and he returned to the Army; rising to the rank of Colonel. From 1923 to 1930, he served as the head of the military hospital near Olomouc.

In 1935, he was elected to the Czech Academy of Arts and Sciences, but resigned in 1938 following the Anschluss. Throughout the Nazi occupation and the communist regime, he remained isolated and was able to publish only a few newspaper articles, written under pseudonyms.

Under the influence of Josef Florian, he published his first novel, Bloudění (Wandering, 1929), an historical piece set in the time of the Thirty Years' War, then Služebníci neužiteční (Roughly: Useless Servants), a novel about Jesuit missionaries in 17th-century Japan, led by Charles Spinola. Only the first part could be published in Czechoslovakia, because Durych was silenced following the Communist coup d'état in 1948. A full four volume edition was published in Rome in 1969. Bloudění was translated into English as Descent of the Idol and published in the United States in 1936.

Durych's Catholic viewpoint was often at odds with the prevailing intellectual climate in the Czechoslovak First Republic; notably his positive evaluation of the developments in Bohemia and baroque culture in general that followed the Battle of White Mountain. Durych felt that the loss suffered there by Frederick V of the Palatinate saved Bohemia from becoming a part of Germany. He was also the target of heavy criticism for supporting the Falangist side during the Spanish Civil War.

Durych died in Prague.

== See also ==
- List of Czech writers
