= Jiří Reynek =

Jiří Reynek (5 July 1929 – 15 October 2014) was a Czech poet and graphic artist. A fluent French speaker, he translated the works of Henri Pourrat and Francis Jammes. He was the son of Suzanne Renaud and Bohuslav Reynek. Photographer Daniel Reynek was his older brother. The family spent winters in Grenoble and summers in Petrkov, where Reynek spent most of his adult life. The family farm was seized by Germany during World War II, then came under state control after Czechoslovakia transitioned to communism in the 1948 coup d'état.

Reynek was born in Paris, France. and died on 15 October 2014, aged 85 in Petrkov, Czech Republic.

== Works ==
- Reynek, Daniel (2012). Kdo chodí tmami (in Czech). ISBN 9788087595138.
- Giono, Jean (2009). Muž, který sázel stromy (in Czech). ISBN 9788086653129.
- Z vln, které zkameněly (in Czech). 2007. ISBN 9788071951087.
- Reynek, Bohuslav (2001). Zima jde do Betléma (in Czech). ISBN 9788086036571.
- O řeřavých očích a jiné příběhy (in Czech). 1997. ISBN 9788090223110.
- Pourrat, Henri (2006). O Půlpánovi a jiné příhody (in Czech). ISBN 9788086653105.
- Jammes, Francis (2002). Román Zajícův (in Czech). ISBN 9788090223189.
- Pinget, Robert (2011). Passacaglia (in Italian). ISBN 9788087048269.
- Kašpar z hor (in Czech). 2001. ISBN 9788090223158.
- Reynek, Jiří (1937). Noc a ráno (in Czech).
- Pourrat, Henri (1994). Poklady z Auvergne (in Czech). ISBN 9788090164628.
- Jammes, Francis (2010). Klekání (in Czech). ISBN 9788090406186.
