= Václav Řezáč =

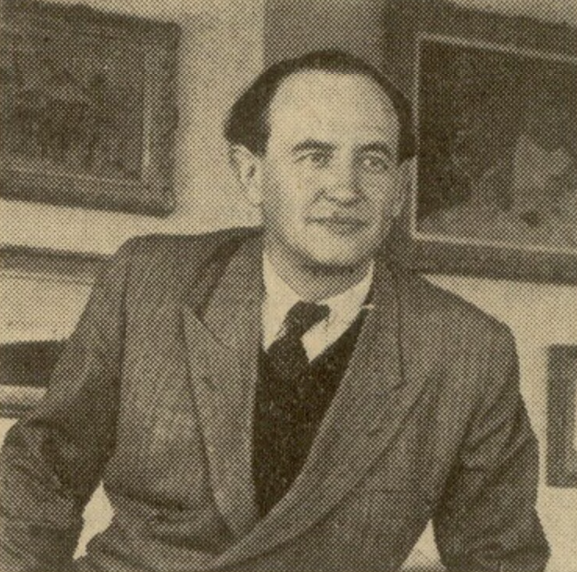
- Born: Václav Voňavka; 5 May 1901; Prague, Austria-Hungary
- Died: 22 June 1956 (aged 55); Prague, Czechoslovakia
- Occupations: Novelist, journalist, screenwriter, poet

Václav Řezáč (born Václav Voňavka; 5 May 1901 – 22 June 1956) was a Czech writer. Initially an author of psychological prose, he later became one of the main representatives of socialist realism in Czech literature.

== Biography ==
He was born in a poor district of Prague, Na Františku, and was orphaned by his father at an early age. After completing his education, he worked as a civil servant in the years throughout the 1920s and 30s also earning money by writing literary and theatre criticism for the magazines Český svět and Eva.

Řezáč began his literary career in the late 1920s, making his debut with the story Knír ("Moustache" 1928), published in the well-known illustrated magazine Světozor. By the 1930s he had become a successful and critically acclaimed novelist, publishing his works in the popular Lidové noviny newspaper.

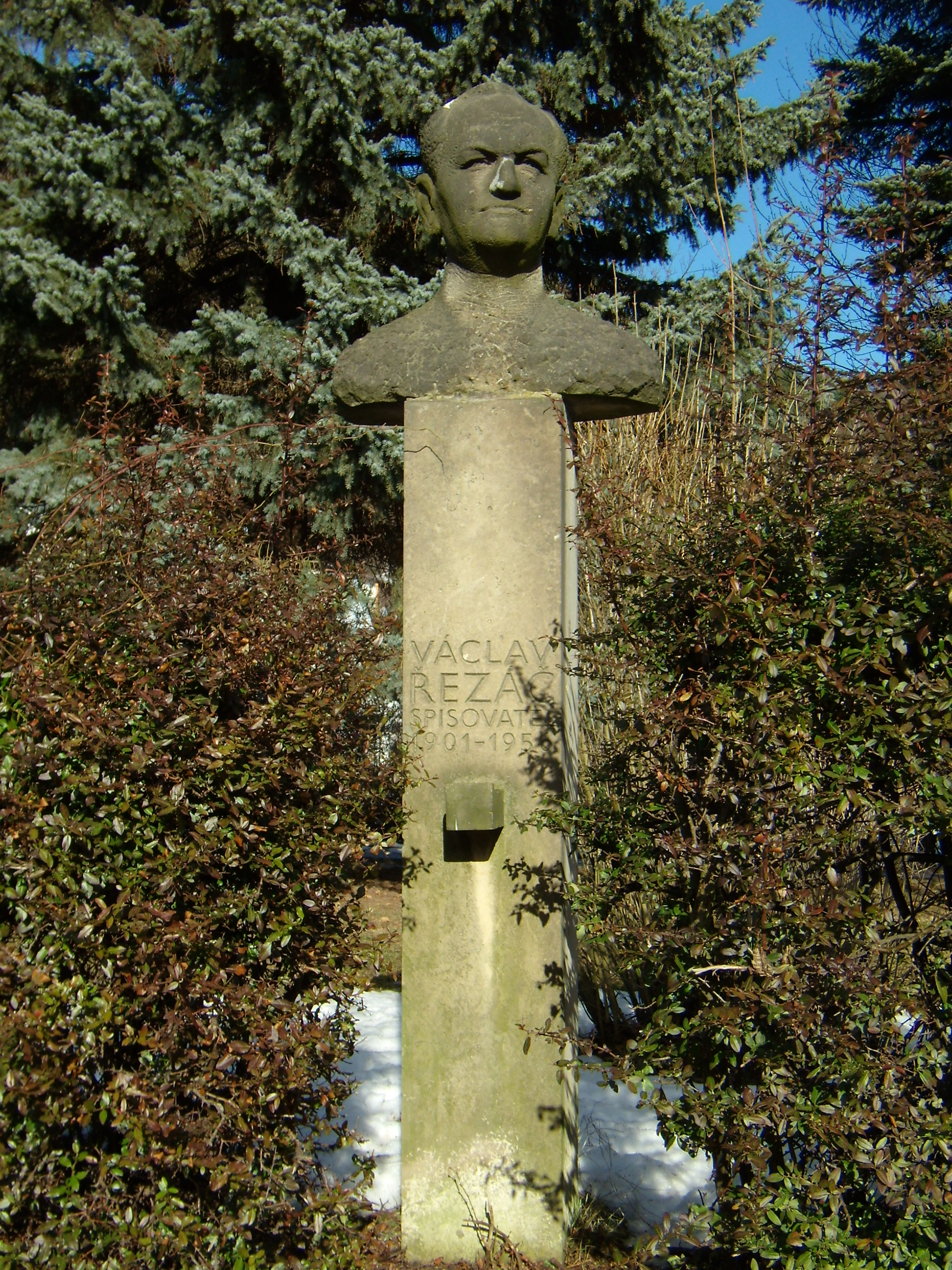
Monument to Václav Řezáč in the village of Perštejn

From 1940 to 1945 he was an editor of the Lidové noviny. After the war he edited the communist trade union daily Práce, was active in the writers' union and in Czechoslovak cinema. One of the main representatives of domestic socialist realism, together with Jan Drda he set the tone for the new trend in Czech literature. From 1949 he held the life-long position of director of the state literary publishing house "Československý spisovatel", which published a 12-volume edition of his works. He was also a member of the directing board of the Union of Czechoslovak Writers and worked at the Svoboda publishing house.

== Selected works ==
- Fidlovačka (1933) – poems for children
- Poplach v Kovářské uličce (1934) – children's story
- Kluci, hurá za ním (1934) – children's story
- Větrná setba (1935) – novel
- Slepá ulička (1938) – novel
- Černé světlo (1940) – novel
- Svědek (1943) – novel
- Stopy v písku (1944) – collection of journalism
- Rozhraní (1945) – novel
- Nástup (1951) – novel
- Bitva (1954) – novel
- Tváří v tvář (1956) – short story collection
