= Otokar Fischer =

Czech literary historian, translator, poet and critic

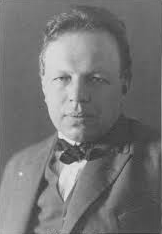
Otokar Fischer

Otokar Fischer (20 May 1883 – 12 March 1938) was a Czech literary historian, translator, poet and critic.

== Biography ==
He was born in Kolín, then part of Austria-Hungary.

He made new translations of Goethe, Shakespeare and Villon. He was a professor at Prague university and the director of National Theatre in Prague.

He died of a heart attack in theatre in Prague, as he learned that Hitler's army had occupied Austria.
