= Petrkov =

- Village
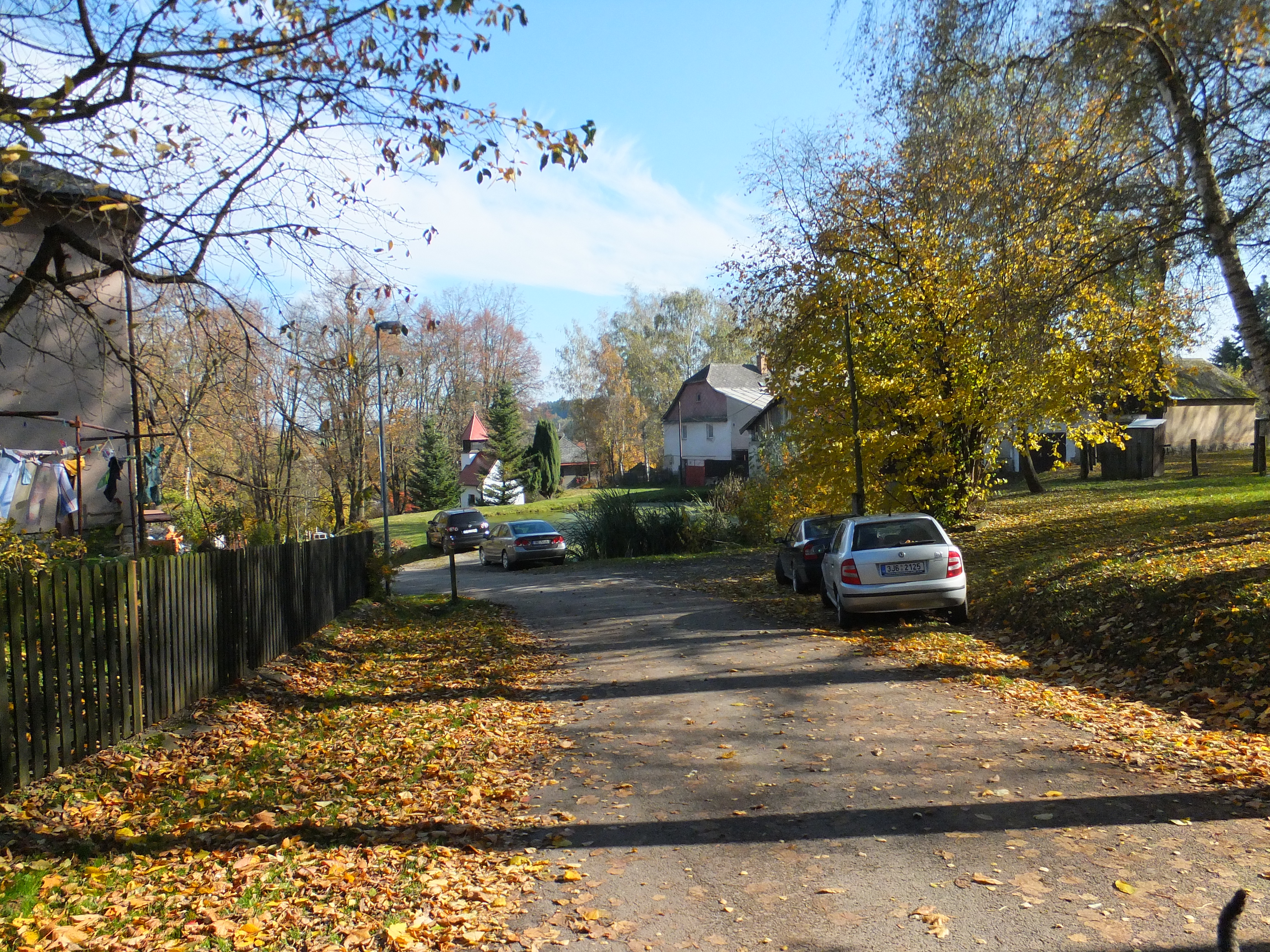
- View towards the centre from the castle

- Location in the Czech Republic
- Coordinates: 49°34′6″N 15°33′32″E
- Country: Czech Republic
- Region: Vysočina
- District: Havlíčkův Brod
- Municipality: Lípa
- First mentioned: 1381

Area
  - Total: 3.63 km^{2} (1.40 sq mi)
- Elevation: 477 m (1,565 ft)

Population (2021)
  - Total: 136
  - Density: 37.5/km^{2} (97.0/sq mi)
- Time zone: UTC+1 (CET)
  - Summer (DST): UTC+2 (CEST)
- Postal code: 580 01

Petrkov (German: Peterkau) is a village and municipal part of Lípa in Havlíčkův Brod District in the Vysočina Region of the Czech Republic. It has about 140 inhabitants. It is located in the northern part of the municipal territory.

== History ==
The first written mention of Petrkov is from 1381, when it was a mining settlement known by its original German name Hohendorf.

It became known for its healing mineral springs in the 16th century, and the first spa buildings were built in 1729. According to a local legend, some 3,000 soldiers healed their war wounds in the springs during the Austro-Prussian War of the 18th century.

In 1894, the train station on the railway line Havlíčkův Brod–Humpolec was built. The spa operated until World War II.

Until 1960, Petrkov was an independent municipality. In 1961, it became a municipal part of Lípa.

== Demographics ==
Historical population

Year	Pop.	±%
1869	326	—
1880	345	+5.8%
1890	290	−15.9%
1900	305	+5.2%
1910	274	−10.2%

Year	Pop.	±%
1921	291	+6.2%
1930	286	−1.7%
1950	196	−31.5%
1961	175	−10.7%
1970	160	−8.6%

Year	Pop.	±%
1980	133	−16.9%
1991	113	−15.0%
2001	120	+6.2%
2011	130	+8.3%
2021	136	+4.6%

Source: Censuses

== Transport ==
Petrkov is located on the railway line Havlíčkův Brod–Humpolec.

== Sights ==
The only protected cultural monument in the village is the 18th century castle. It was originally a fortress, first documented in 1540, which was rebuilt in the first half of the 18th century. In the early 20th century, the poet and painter Bohuslav Reynek and his French wife Suzanne Renaud lived in the castle.
