= Suzanne Renaud =

French poet and translator (1889–1964)

- Born: 30 September 1889; Lyon, France
- Died: 21 January 1964 (aged 74); Havlíčkův Brod, Czechoslovakia
- Occupation: Poet

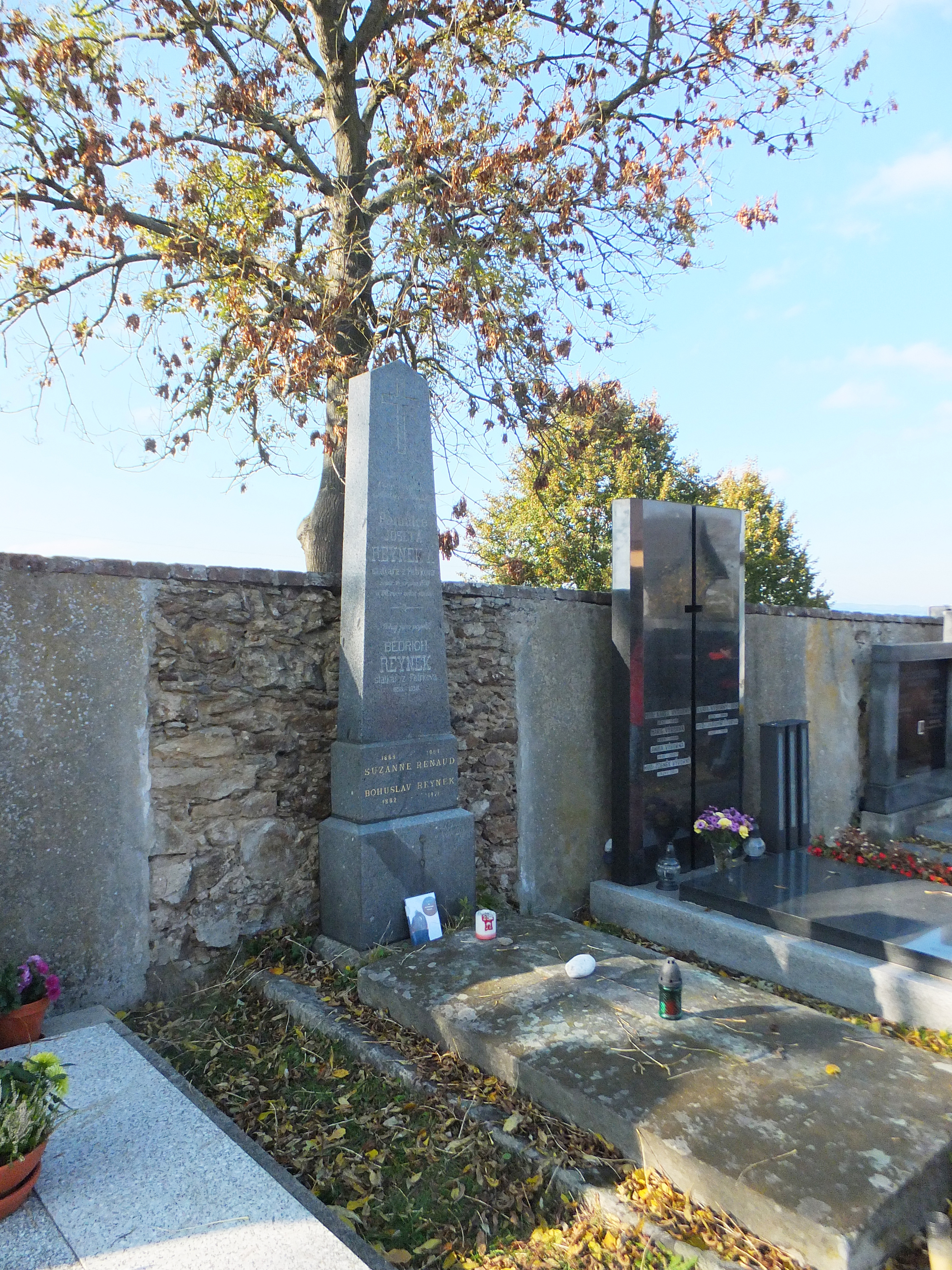
Grave of Suzanne Renaud and Bohuslav Reynek in Svatý Kříž, part of Havlíčkův Brod

Suzanne Renaud (30 September 1889 – 21 January 1964) was a French poet and translator.

== Life ==
Renaud was born on 30 September 1889 in Lyon. She moved from Lyon to Grenoble in 1894, and during World War I she worked at the military infirmary there. In 1926 she married the Czechoslovak poet Bohuslav Reynek in Grenoble, who had come to seek her permission to translate her poetry in 1923. For the next ten years they divided their time between France and Czechoslovakia, settling in the latter country definitively in 1936 in the village Petrkov. She translated her husband's works into French, as he did for her. In the years 1947–1959 she corresponded with the French writer Henri Pourrat. She also translated the Czech poets Vladimír Holan and František Halas into French.

They had two sons: Daniel Reynek (1928–2014), a photographer, and Jiří Reynek (1929–2014), a graphic artist, poet and translator.

She died on 21 January 1964 in Havlíčkův Brod.

== Works ==
- Ta vie est là (Saint-Félicien-en-Vivarais: éditions du Pigeonnier, 1922)
- Ailes de cendre (Pardubice: Vokolek, 1932), with illustrations by Bohuslav Reynek
- Křídla z popele (Pardubice: Vokolek, 1935), translation of Ailes de cendre by Reynek
- Victimae laudes (Pardubice: Vokolek, 1938), poetry collection
- Dveře v přítmí (Kroměříž: Magnificat, 1946), translation by Reynek
- Chvála oběti poems translated into Czech by Bohuslav Reynek (Brno: Atlantis, 1948)
- Romarin ou Annette et Jean - Ballades et poésies populaires tchèques et moraves Renaud's translation of Czech and Moravian ballads and poetry
