= Josef Formánek =

Czech writer, journalist and traveller

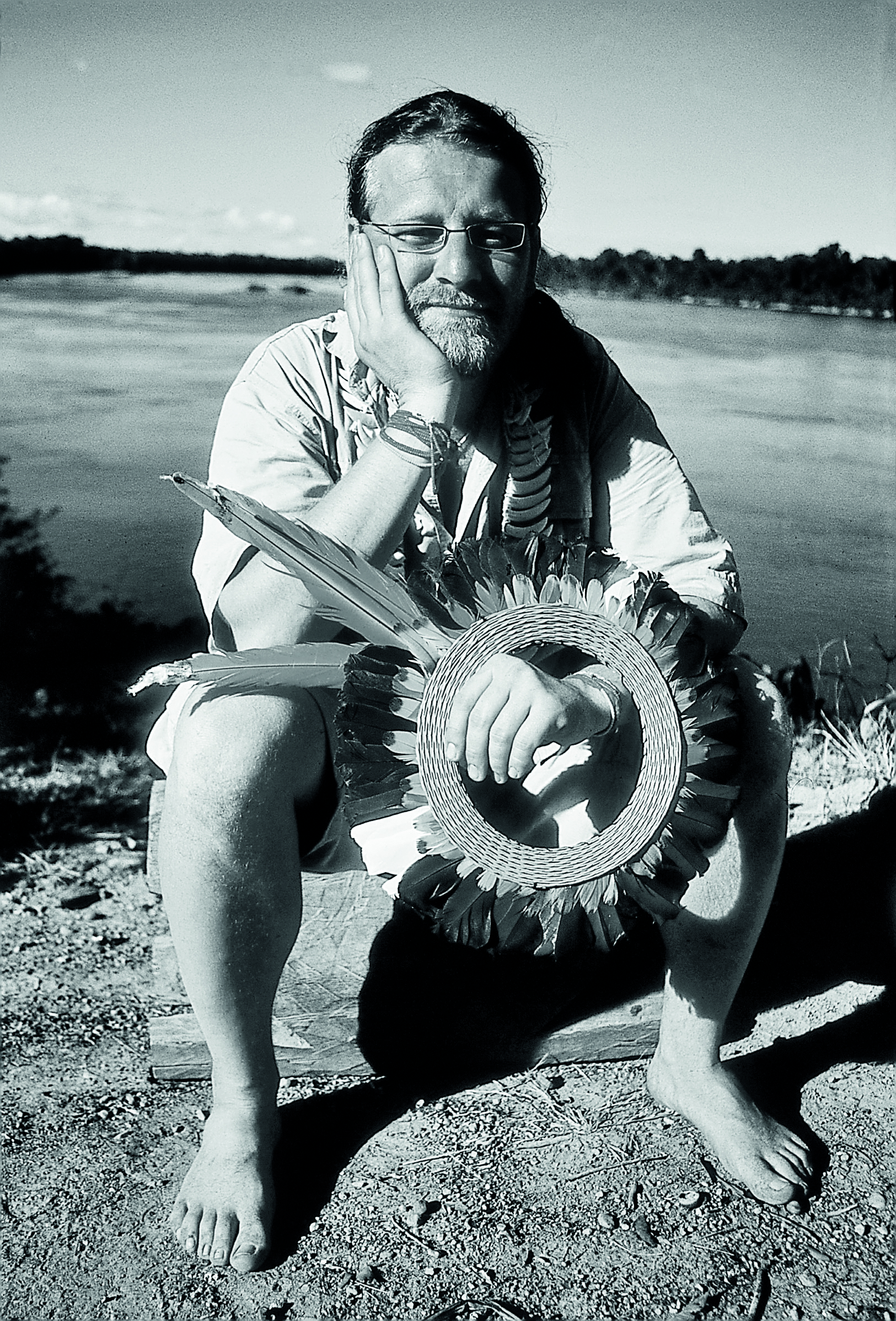
- Born: 16 June 1969; Ústí nad Labem, Czechoslovakia
- Occupation: Writer
- Children: Karolína and Nina (daughters)
- Writing career
- Notable works: Prsatý muž a zloděj příběhů (The Breasted Man and the Thief of Stories); Mluviti pravdu (To Speak the Truth)

Josef Formánek (born 16 June 1969) is a Czech writer, journalist and traveller.

== Life ==
Formánek was born in Ústí nad Labem, Czechoslovakia. He studied at the Secondary Technical School of Agriculture in Roudnice nad Labem. With Miroslav Urbánek he co-founded a geographic magazine called Koktejl in 1992. He worked as its editor in chief for almost thirteen years, and his job brought him to over thirty countries around the world. Of these, it was an island called Siberut, which influenced him most. He was also at the origins of magazines Oceán, Everest, Fénix, Kleopatra, Nevěsta and a children's magazine Říše divů. In cooperation with several renowned photographers, adventurers and writers he organized a retraining course "editor of a magazine", taking place in the editorial office of Koktejl magazine. Today, Formánek focuses entirely on writing. He has written six books so far. He has two daughters, Karolína and Nina; he would like to take them to the island of Siberut one day and show them all the wisdom of indigenous peoples and the mysterious charm of the virgin forest.

== The author and the island of Siberut ==
Josef Formánek has visited Siberut four times. On this island, situated to the west of Sumatra in the Indian Ocean, he spent about six months between 1997 and 2000. He also travelled to the island as part of a two-month humanitarian mission after the tsunami in December 2005. He made his last trip to Siberut in 2013. Formánek is fascinated by indigenous peoples and regards Siberut as his second home. He described the experiences of his stay on the island and meeting the people of the Mentawai tribe in travel passages of his debut as well as his penultimate novel, Syn Větru a Prsatý muž (The Son of Wind and the Breasted Man). Before going to Siberut, he learnt the basics of the Mentawai language from a Mentawai-German missionary dictionary. The first time he travelled to Siberut with two friends for two months. The second time, he spent three months on the island accompanied by a Charles University student of Indonesian. During this visit Formánek collected artefacts for an exhibition he was planning. He also had a ritual Mentawai tattoos made across the entire upper part of his body, in which the forest and the Sun - the giver of life are represented through geometric shapes. For ten years, he has worn red and yellow shamanic beads on his hands, which are to protect him from evil spirits.

In the autumn of 2002, Josef Formánek exhibited Mentawai artefacts and photographs in an exhibition at the National Museum entitled "Siberut-Eyes of Spirits". This was part of "Mysterious Indonesia", a large exhibition he organized together with Jiří Hanzelka, Miroslav Zikmund, Rudolf Švaříček and Miloslav Stingl. His artefacts were also exhibited in Prachatice and Karlovy Vary. Following the tsunami in Indonesia on 26 December 2005, on the initiative of Hruška, a gallery owner, Josef Formánek put together a project named “We are not alone”, aimed at supporting the regions affected by the disaster. Sixty-six ceramic heads of Czech artists were painted and sold at an auction for a sum of 686,400 CZK. The proceeds were used to purchase humanitarian aid, namely equipment for schools, nurseries and sewing workshop. Josef Formánek volunteered to take part in a mission of the Czech Red Cross and brought the material aid to Aceh on Sumatra and to the island of Siberut. During the two-month journey, Formánek underwent a shamanic initiation ritual on Siberut. He has not taken shamanic rites of passage so far. Formánek tried to intervene against activities of missionaries in the uncivilized forest regions. In 1995, he wrote an open letter to Pope John Paul II, on the basis of which he was granted an interview with the Nuncio in Prague, Giovanni Coppa. However, Formánek's efforts were not received with understanding during the interview.

== Work ==
Formánek's writing phase was preceded by his travel phase. Discovering and exploring he knew from travel books, which he read as a boy, have become an inspiration for him. His countless travel experiences gave rise to his desire to share the new things he learns, either in a story or in a book. He has written six books, published by publishing houses Smart Press, s.r.o. and by Gekko Distribution, s.r.o. It took him seven years to write his debut novel Prsatý muž a zloděj příběhů (The Breasted Man and the Thief of Stories). It was published in 2003 and became the most successful debut novel of the decade – so far more than 72,000 copies have been sold. As of 2013, thanks to a large reader response the 12th edition is being sold and even an audio recording has been made, read out by the actor Jiří Štěpnička.

His second book Létající jaguár (The Flying Jaguar) was published in 2004. It was produced in a record time. The writer made a bet with his publisher, Ivo Železný, that he would write a novel in twelve hours (in the end, he succeeded to do so in a shorter time, 11 hours 19 minutes). It then took the publisher further 12 hours to release it. The proceeds from the first edition (700 pieces) in the amount of 68,000 CZK were donated to a newly opened elephant pavilion at the Ústí nad Labem Zoo.

Formánek's third book Mluviti pravdu (To Tell the Truth) came out in 2008. More than 34,000 copies have been sold. Based on this book, the Hollywood screenwriter Mitch Markowitz is writing a film script. The fourth book Umřel jsem v sobotu (I Died on a Saturday), which took the author two years to write, was released in 2011.

So far, his penultimate book called Syn větru a prsatý muž (The Son of Wind and the Breasted Man) was published in 2013. His last book Úsměvy smutných mužů (The Smiles of Sad Men) was released in 2014. All Formánek’s works combine autobiographic features, multi layers, formal division into a number of chapters and sub-chapters, illustrations by the artist Dalibor Nesnídal as well as the main theme: search for the meaning of life.

== Bibliography ==
- Prsatý muž a zloděj příběhů (The Breasted Man and the Thief of Stories), 2003
- Létající jaguár (The Flying Jaguar), 2004
- Mluviti pravdu (To Tell the Truth), 2008
- Umřel jsem v sobotu (I Died on a Saturday). 2011
- Syn větru a prsatý muž (The Son of Wind and the Breasted Man), 2013
- Úsměvy smutných mužů (The Smiles of Sad Men), 2014
