= Emil Hakl =

Czech poet and novelist

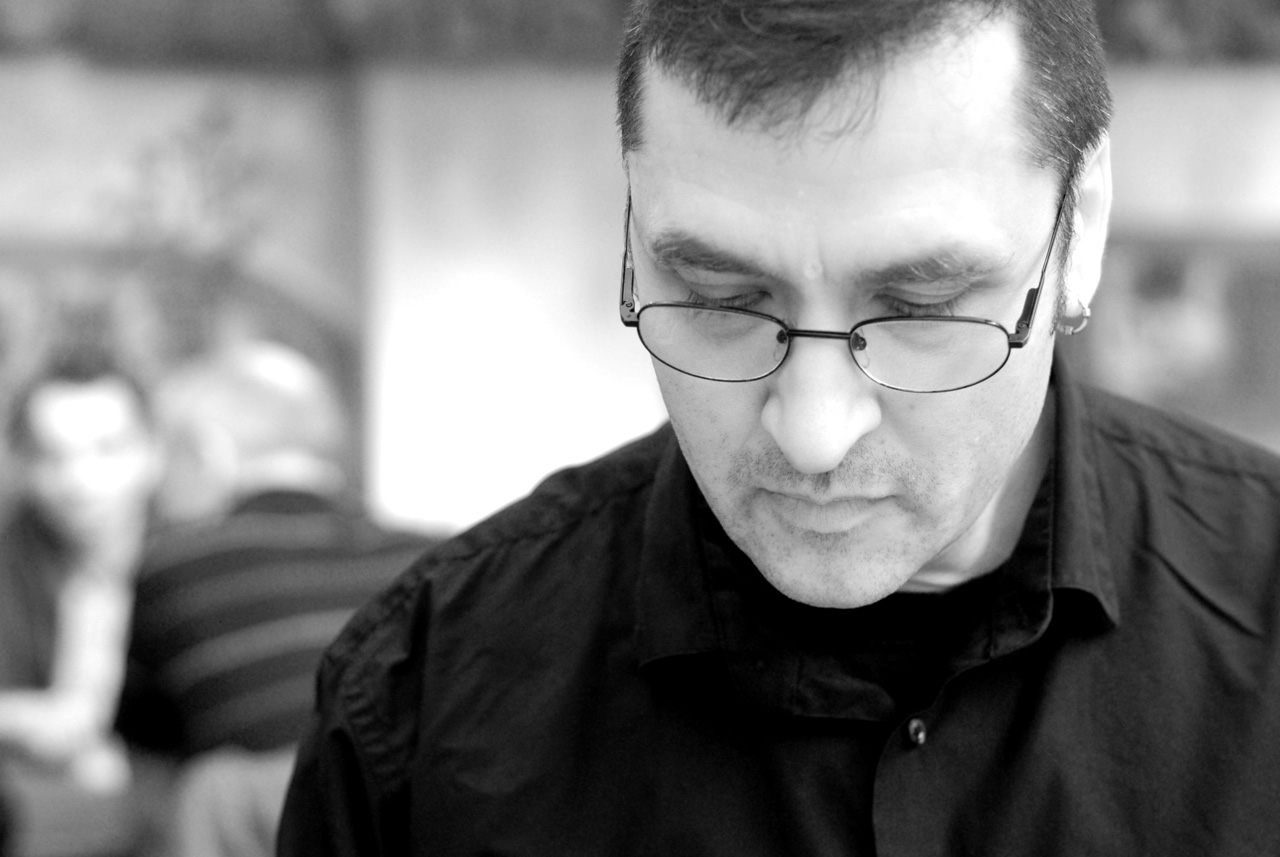
Czech author Emil Hakl

Jan Beneš (born 25 March 1958), better known by the pseudonym Emil Hakl, is a Czech poet and novelist. He resides in Prague, his birthplace.

== Biography ==
Emil Hakl was born Jan Beneš on 25 March 1958 in Prague. He graduated from the Jaroslav Ježek Conservatory in Prague. He then worked as a mechanic at a gas station and as a copywriter at an advertising agency in the 1990s. In the late 1980s, he co-founded "Moderní analfabet" (lit. 'modern illiterate'), an informal literary association, and later worked with the literary club "Literární a kulturní Klub 8" (lit. 'literary and cultural club 8'). In 2001, he was the editor of the literary magazine Tvar.

== Style ==
Emil Hakl is considered prolonging Bohumil Hrabal's legacy —in terms of his poetic, direct, and expressive language—and close to his contemporary Václav Kahuda. According to literary critic Dalibor Malina, "Hakl needs little to create an atmosphere and create characters. Hakl means something within Czech literature." In the author's own words.
