= Stará Říše =

- Market town
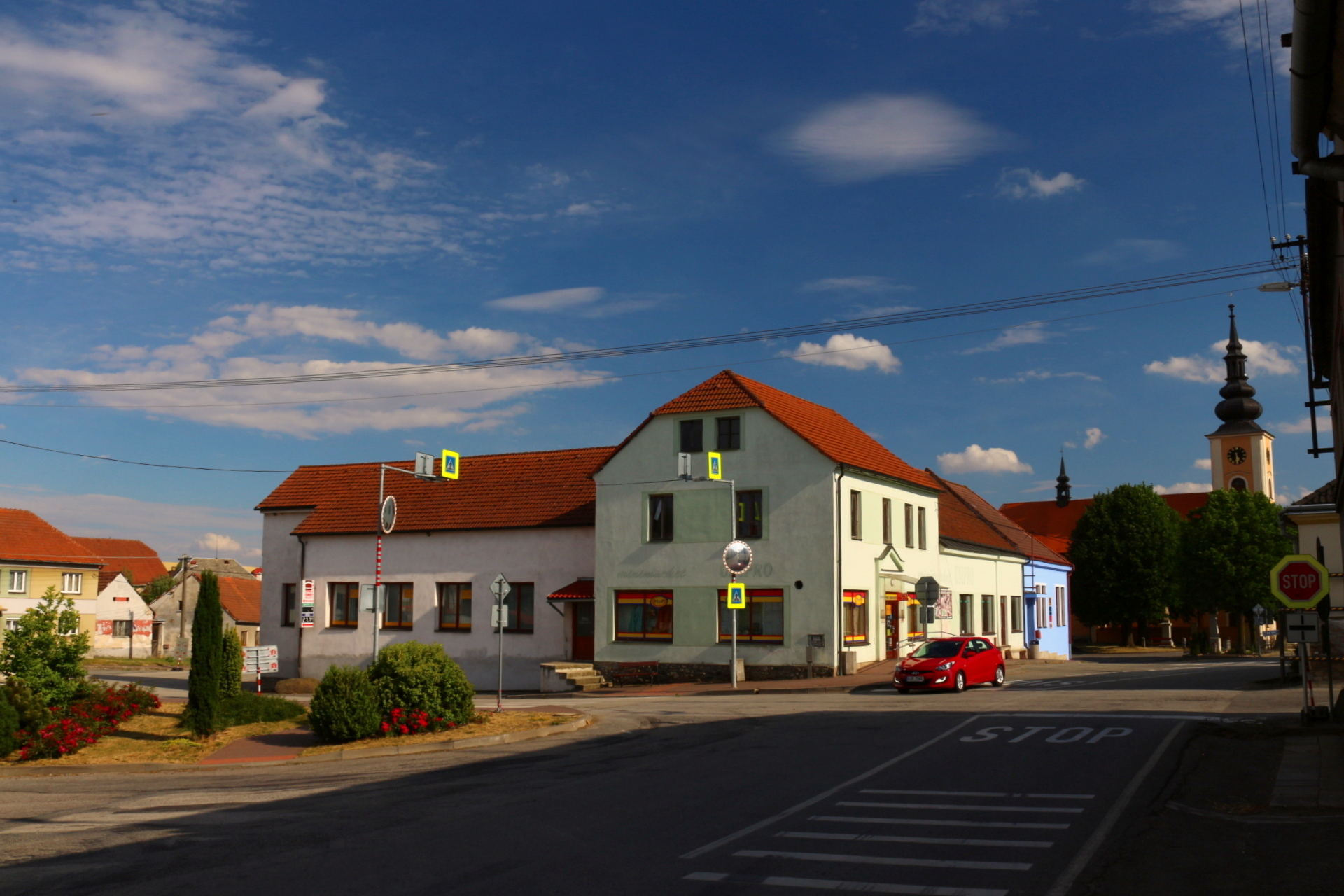
- Centre of Stará Říše

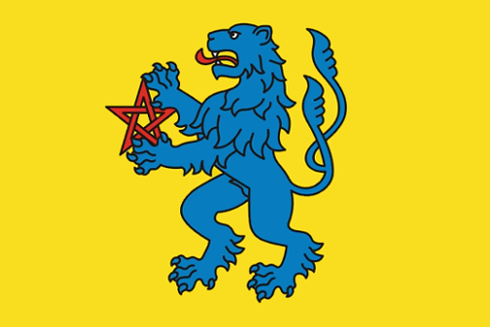
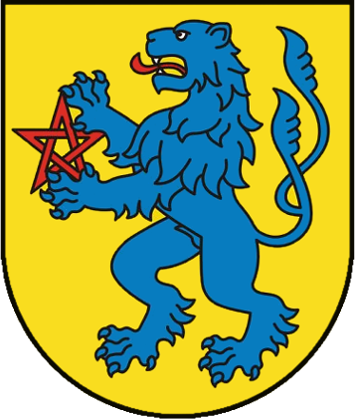
- Flag Coat of arms

- Location in the Czech Republic
- Coordinates: 49°10′47″N 15°35′41″E
- Country: Czech Republic
- Region: Vysočina
- District: Jihlava
- First mentioned: 1257

Area
  - Total: 17.75 km^{2} (6.85 sq mi)
- Elevation: 587 m (1,926 ft)

Population (2026-01-01)
  - Total: 627
  - Density: 35.3/km^{2} (91.5/sq mi)
- Time zone: UTC+1 (CET)
  - Summer (DST): UTC+2 (CEST)
- Postal code: 588 67
- Website: www.stararise.cz

Stará Říše (Czech pronunciation: [ˈstaraːˈ r̝iːʃɛ]; German: Alt Reisch) is a market town in Jihlava District in the Vysočina Region of the Czech Republic. It has about 600 inhabitants.

== Administrative division ==
Stará Říše consists of two municipal parts (in brackets population according to the 2021 census):

- Stará Říše (597)
- Nepomuky (3)

== Geography ==
Stará Říše is located about 24 kilometres (15 mi) south of Jihlava. It lies in the Křižanov Highlands. The highest point is the hill Veselský vrch at 712 m (2,336 ft) above sea level. There are several fishponds around the market town.

== History ==
The first written mention of Stará Říše is from 1257. It was a settlement located on a frequented trade route. In 1589, Stará Říše was promoted to a market town by Emperor Rudolf II. In 1758, a large fire destroyed almost all of Stará Říše, and all representative buildings except the school had to be rebuilt.

== Demographics ==
Historical population

Year	Pop.	±%
1869	707	—
1880	751	+6.2%
1890	734	−2.3%
1900	705	−4.0%
1910	717	+1.7%

Year	Pop.	±%
1921	795	+10.9%
1930	791	−0.5%
1950	694	−12.3%
1961	755	+8.8%
1970	745	−1.3%

Year	Pop.	±%
1980	679	−8.9%
1991	655	−3.5%
2001	661	+0.9%
2011	630	−4.7%
2021	600	−4.8%

Source: Censuses

== Transport ==
The I/23 road from Třebíč to Jindřichův Hradec runs through the market town.

== Sights ==
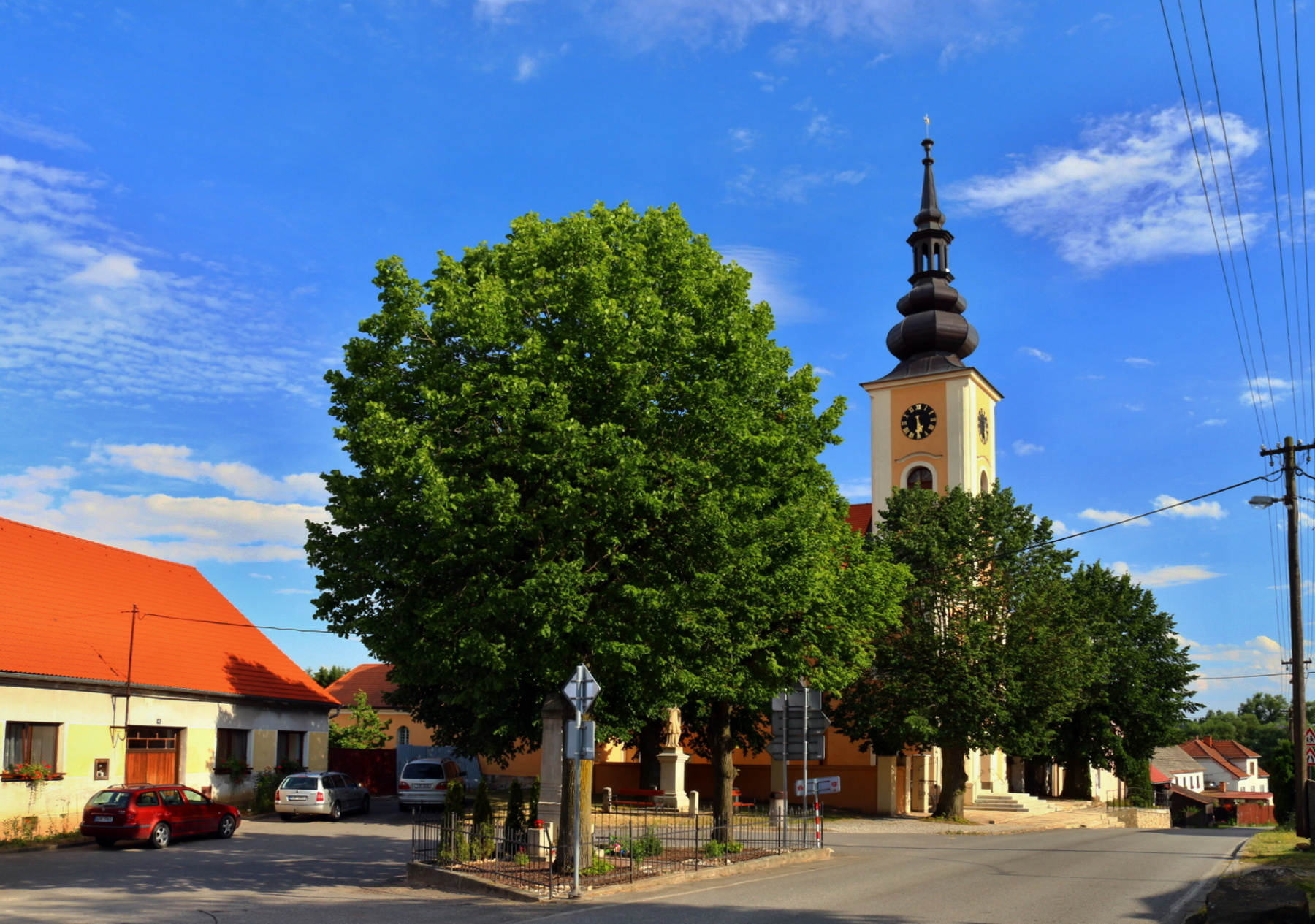
Church of All Saints

The main landmark of Stará Říše is the Church of All Saints. It was built in the Baroque style after 1758.

== Notable people ==
- Josef Florian (1873–1941), publisher and translator
- Juliana Jirousová (1943–2023), artist and painter
