= Karel Matěj Čapek-Chod =

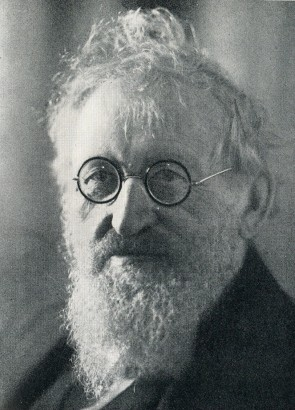
- Born: Karel Matěj Čapek; 21 February 1860 Domažlice, Bohemia, Austria-Hungary
- Died: 3 November 1927 (aged 67) Prague, Czechoslovakia

Karel Matěj Čapek-Chod (Czech pronunciation: [ˈkarɛl ˈmacɛj ˈtʃapɛk ˈxot]; 21 February 1860 – 3 November 1927) was a Czech naturalist writer and a journalist.

== Biography ==
Karel Matěj Čapek was born on 21 February 1860 in Domažlice. In 1879, he graduated at the gymnasium in Domažlice. He was a long-term cooperator of the Národní listy journal, and after Karel Čapek began to work in the editorial office (in 1917), Čapek accepted the nickname "Chod".

== Work ==
- Povídky, 1892
- V třetím dvoře, novel 1895
- Nedělní povídky, 1897
- Osmero novel: 1900-1903
- Patero novel 1900-1903
- Kašpar Lén mstitel, novel, 1908
- Z města i obvodu, novel, 1913
- Antonín Vondrejc. novel, 1915
- Turbína, novel, 1916
- Ad hoc! novelle, 1919
- Nejzápadnější Slovan (The westernmost Slav), 1921
- Jindrové, novel, 1921
- Větrník: autoanalytic-synthetic novel, 1923
- Vilém Rozkoč, novel, 1923
- Humoreska, 1924
- Labyrint světa, 1926
- Řešany, novel, 1927
- An der Rotationsmaschine, novelle, 1928
- Spisy, 1938–41

== See also ==
- List of Czech writers
