= Josef Florian =

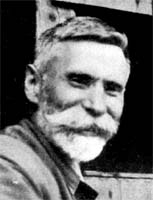
- Florian in 1930
- Born: 9 February 1873; Stará Říše, Moravia, Austria-Hungary
- Died: 29 December 1941 (aged 68); Stará Říše, Protectorate of Bohemia and Moravia
- Occupations: Book publisher and translator

Josef Florian (9 February 1873 – 29 December 1941) was a Czech book publisher and translator.

== Life ==
Florian was born on 9 February 1873 in Stará Říše, Moravia, Austria-Hungary. He graduated from the real school in Telč. From 1894, he studied engineering and later philosophy in Prague. In 1898–1900, he taught natural history at a secondary school in Náchod, but physically attacked the school principal and was fired. In 1900, he read Léon Bloy's ideas in the La Plume review. He received permission from Léon Bloy to translate his work. He returned to his home town of Stará Říše and founded a publishing house. He published his first book in 1903. He became recognised for high quality of printing. He published books in two editions, one focusing on theological, philosophical and similar texts, and the other on fiction. He constantly had problems with lack of money and in 1909 he had to sell his house.

As a translator, Florian mainly focused on French works, but also translated from German and Russian. He translated 68 books in total. He died in Stará Říše on 29 December 1941.

== Work ==
He was famous for the high quality of books he published in his small publishing company in Stará Říše. Both local authors and foreign translations were published in topics including philosophy, theology, medieval literature and scientific studies — totalling 387 publications in editions Dobré dílo, Studium, Nova et Vetera, Kurs and Archy.

== Family ==
In 1902, he married Františka Stehlíková. They had twelve children. Their daughter, Marie Stritzková-Florianová (1909–1998), was a painter and artist. His granddaughter, Juliana Jirousová (1937–2023), was also a painter noted for her paintings of Catholic saints and a signatory of Charter 77.
