= Jiří =

Jiří (Czech pronunciation: [ˈjɪr̝iː]) is a Czech masculine given name, the equivalent of George in English. Notable people with the name include:

== B ==
- Georg Benda (Jiří Antonín Benda), Czech composer, violinist and Kapellmeister
- Jiří Baborovský, Czech physical chemist
- Jiří Barta, Czech animator and director
- Jiří Bartoška, Czech actor
- Jiří Bicek, Slovak ice hockey player
- Jiří Bobok, Czech footballer
- Jiří Bubla, Czech ice hockey player
- Jiří Buquoy, Czech aristocrat, mathematician and inventor
- Jiří Bělohlávek, Czech conductor
- Jiří Brdečka, Czech writer, artist and film director

== C ==
- Jiří Čeřovský, Czech regional politician and former athlete
- Jiří Čunek, Czech politician
- Jiří Crha, Czech ice hockey player

== D ==
- Jiří Dopita, Czech ice hockey player
- Jiří Družecký (1745–1819), Bohemian-born Austrian composer and timpanist
- Jiří Dudáček, Czech ice hockey player
- Jiří Džmura, Czech bobsledder

== F ==
- Jiří Feureisl, Czechoslovak football player
- Jiří Fischer, Czech ice hockey player and coach

== G ==
- Jiří Grossmann, Czechoslovak theatre actor, poet, and composer
- Jiří Gruša, Czech poet, novelist, translator, diplomat and politician
- Jiří Grygar, Silesian astrophysicist and astronomer

== H ==
- Jiří Hájek, Czech politician and diplomat
- Jiří Hála, Czech ice hockey player
- Jiří Hanke, Czechoslovak soccer player and soccer coach
- Jiří Havlíček, Czech politician
- Jiří Hledík, Czech footballer
- Jiří Holeček, Czech ice hockey player
- Jiří Holík, Czech ice hockey player and coach
- Jiří Homola, Czech footballer
- Jiří Horák, Czech politician and political analyst
- Jiří Hrdina, Czech ice hockey player
- Jiří Hřebec, Czech tennis player
- Jiří Hudec, Czech retired male track and field athlete
- Jiří Hudec (composer), Czech composer, conductor and organist
- Jiří Hudler, Czech ice hockey player

== J ==
- Jiří Jantovsky, Czech ice hockey player
- Jiří Jarošík, Czech association football player
- Jiri Jelinek (born 1977), Czech dancer
- Jiří Jeslínek, several people
- Jiří Jirmal, Czech classical guitarist

== K ==
- Jiří Kaufman, Czech soccer player
- Jiří Kavan, Czechoslovak handball player
- Jiří Kladrubský, Czech Supercup winner, soccer player and soccer resistant
- Jiří Kochta, Czech ice hockey coach and ice hockey player
- Jiří Kolář, Czech poet, writer, painter and translator
- Jiří Korn, Czech musician and actor
- Jiří Koubský, Czech soccer player
- Jiří Králík, Czech ice hockey player
- Jiří Krampol, Czech actor, comedian and television presenter
- Jiří Kulhánek, Czech fantasy writer
- Jiří Kylián, Czech dance choreographer

== L ==
- Jiří Lábus, Czech actor
- Jiří Lála, Czech ice hockey player
- Jiří Látal, Czech ice hockey player
- Jiří Lehečka, Czech professional tennis player
- Jiří Lenko, Czech association football player
- Jiri Lev, Australian architect and urbanist
- Jiří Levý, Czech literary theorist and translator
- Jiří Ignác Línek (1725–1791), Bohemian late-Baroque composer
- Jiří Lobkowicz, Czech entrepreneur
- Jiří Kristián z Lobkowicz, Austro-Bohemian noble and politician

== M ==
- Jiři Mádl (born 1986), Czech film actor
- Jiří Mahen, Czech novelist, playwright and essayist
- Jiří Malec, Czechoslovak ski jumper
- Jiří Malysa (born 1966), Czech race walker
- Jiří Mašek, Czech footballer
- Jiří Maštálka, Czech member of Czech parliament
- Jiří Matoušek (disambiguation), several people
- Jiří Menzel, Czech film director, theatre director, actor, and screenwriter
- Jiří Mucha, Czech journalist, writer, screenwriter, author of autobiographical novels and studies of the works of his father, the painter Alphonse Mucha
- Jiří Mužík, Czech runner, Olympic athlete and hurdler

== N ==
- Jiří Načeradský, Czech painter, graphic artist and educator
- Jiří Nigrin, Czech name for Georgius Nigrinus, publisher
- Jiří Novotný, several people
- Jiří Novák (born 1975), Czech tennis player
- Jiří Tibor Novak (born 1947), Czech-born Australian artist, illustrator, and writer
- Jiří Němec, Czech footballer

== O ==
- Jiří Orten, Czech poet
- Jiří Ovčáček, former Czech spokesman

== P ==
- Jiří Parma, Czech ski jumper
- Jiří Paroubek, Czech politician and former Prime Minister
- Jiří Pauer, Czech music educator and composer
- Jiří Pelikán, several people
- Jiří Petr, Czech agroscientist, university professor and Emeritus Chancellor (Rector Emeritus) of the Czech University of Agriculture Prague
- Jiří Pešek, Czech football player and professional coach
- Jiří z Poděbrad, George of Kunštát and Poděbrady (1420–1471), (German: Georg von Podiebrad), was King of Bohemia (1458–1471)
- Jiří Pospíšil, Czech politician
- Jiří Poukar, Czech ice hockey forward
- Jiří Procházka, Czech mixed martial artist

== R ==
- Jiří Raška, Czechoslovak ski jumper
- Jiří Rohan, Czech slalom canoeist
- Jiří Rosický (disambiguation), several people
- Jiří Ryba, Czech decathlete

== S ==
- Jiří Sabou, Czech soccer player
- Jiří Šejba, Czech retired ice hockey forward
- Jiří Sequens, Czech film director
- Jiří Skobla, Czechoslovak shot-putter
- Jiří Šlégr, Czech former ice hockey player
- Jiří Snítil, Czech curler
- Jiří Sovák, Czech actor
- Jiří Štajner, Czech footballer
- Jiří Štancl, Czechoslovak speedway racer
- Jiří Stivín, Czech flute player and composer
- Jiří Stříbrný (1880–1955), Czech politician
- Jiří Suchý, Czech actor and writer

== T ==
- Jiří Teplý, Czech cross-country skier
- Jiří Tichý, Czech footballer
- Jiří Tlustý, Czech ice hockey player
- Jiří Tožička, Czech ice hockey player
- Jiří Trnka, Czech puppet-maker, illustrator, motion-picture animator and film director
- Jiří Třanovský, Lutheran priest and hymnwriter

== V ==
- Jiří Vaněk, several people
- Jiří Veselý, Czech professional tennis player
- Jiří Vojáček, Czech politician
- Jiří Voskovec, Czech actor, writer, dramatist, and director
- Jiří Votruba, Czech painter, illustrator, and graphic designer

== W ==
- Jiří Wachsmann, Czech actor, writer, dramatist, and director
- Jiří Weil (1900–1959), Czech Jewish writer and novelist
- Jiří Welsch, Czech basketball player
- Jiří Wolker, Czech poet, journalist and playwright

== Z ==
- Jiří Zelenka, Czech ice hockey forward
- Jiri Zidek (paleontologist), contemporary Czech paleontologist
- George Zidek (b. Jiří Zídek, 1973), basketball player

== See also ==
- Ziri, disambiguative list
- Jiri (disambiguation)
- Jiřina (disambiguation)
- George (given name)
- List of Czechs
