= Alfred Seifert =

German painter

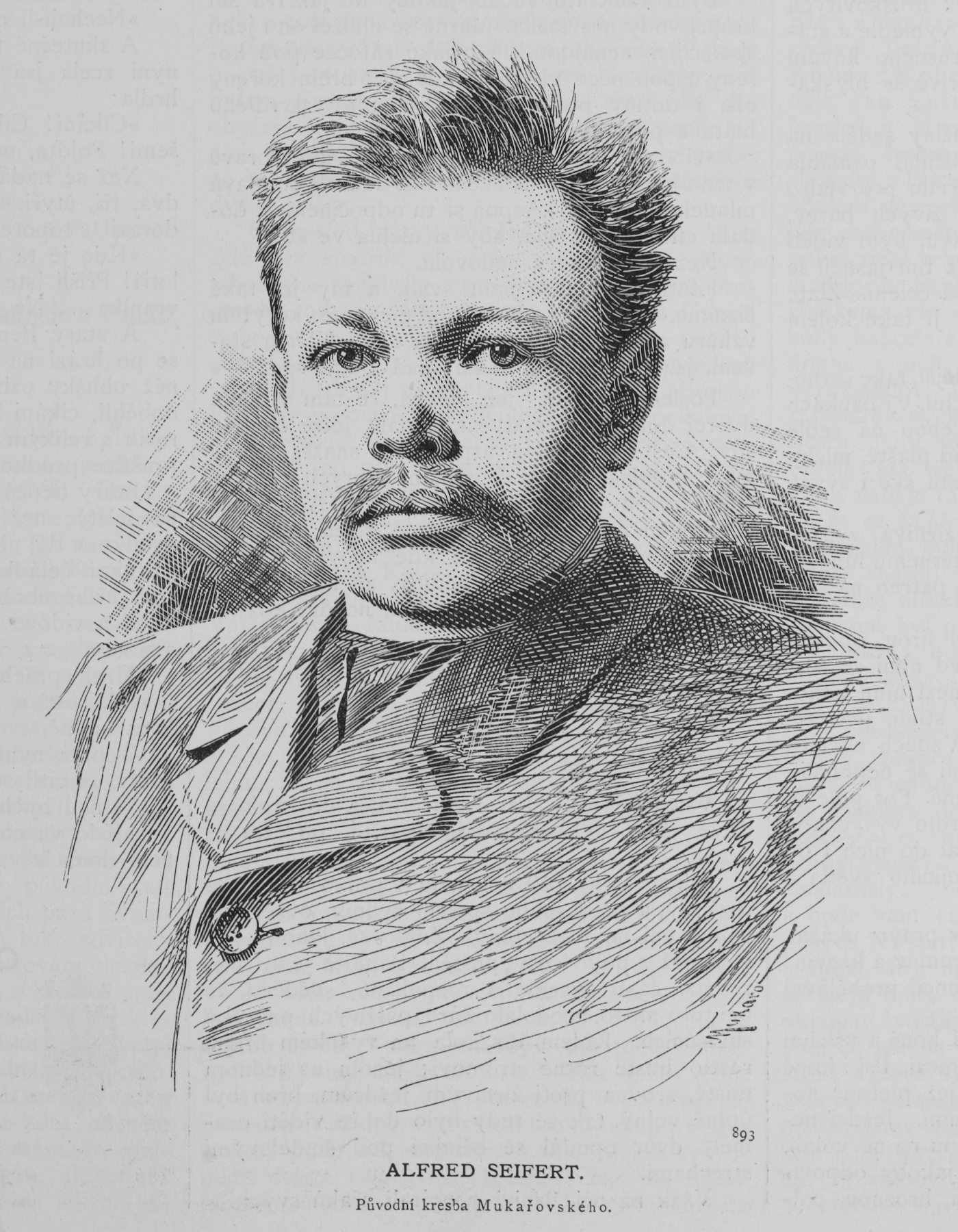
Alfred Seifert (by Josef Mukařovský, 1885)

Alfred Seifert (6 September 1850 – 6 February 1901) was a Czech-German painter, acclaimed for his female portraits.

== History ==
Seifert was born in Praskolesy, Bohemia, Austrian Empire (present-day Czech Republic), but within a few months, his family moved to nearby Hořovice. As a child, he fell seriously ill, could not walk for four years and spent two years in an orthopedic institution. Instead of playing, he began to draw pictures and his artistic talent soon started to emerge. His first teachers were Karl Würbs, inspector of the Estates Gallery at Prague Castle, and Alois Kirnig, a landscape painter. After two years of studies at a high school in Malá Strana district of Prague, he received an admission to the Academy of Fine Arts Munich in 1869. In 1876, he opened his own workshop there.

Seifert focused on portraits of women, especially on sentimentally conceived heads of girls which became known as "Seifert type". Critics appreciated his well-thought compositions, attention to detail, and harmonious colors.

Seifert spent most of his life in Germany. In native Bohemia, he was personally almost unknown, though he had exhibitions in Prague and black-and-white reproductions of his works regularly appeared in Světozor magazine. Some Czechs criticized his lack of patriotism by pointing out his preference for foreign topics over domestic ones. His approach, however, was explained by financial reality: to make his living, he had to create such paintings that his Munich audience was willing to buy. In Bohemia, his works did not sell well, even if he accommodated. For example, his history painting Jan Augusta welcomes Filipina Welser waited long for a buyer. To a church in Hořovice, he donated his painting Ave Maria, depicting a young girl praying to Virgin Mary.

His other famous works include: Ophelia, Titania, Walk out of the gate, Spring of love and Tales of spooks.

== Gallery ==
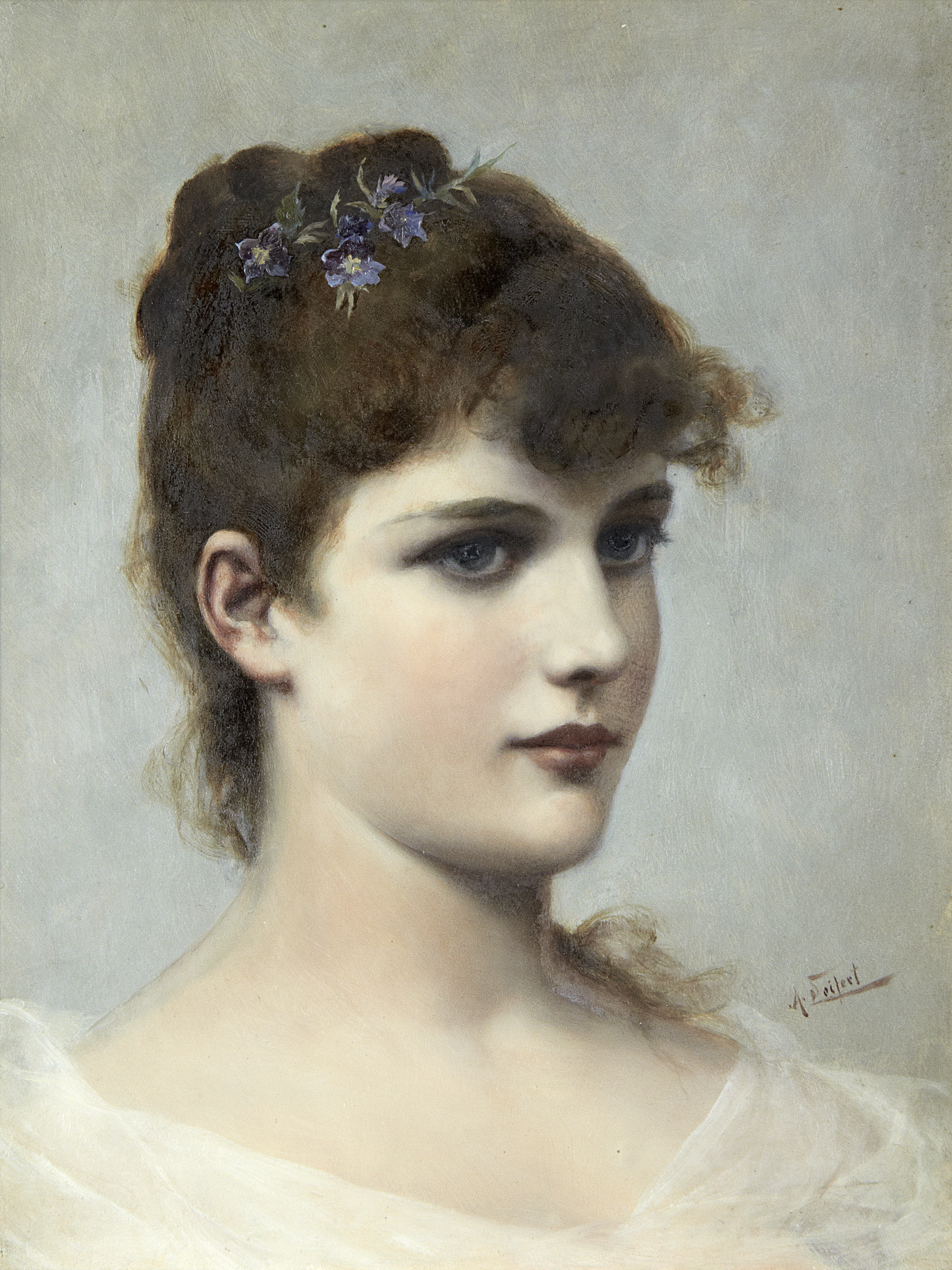
Sweet Sixteen

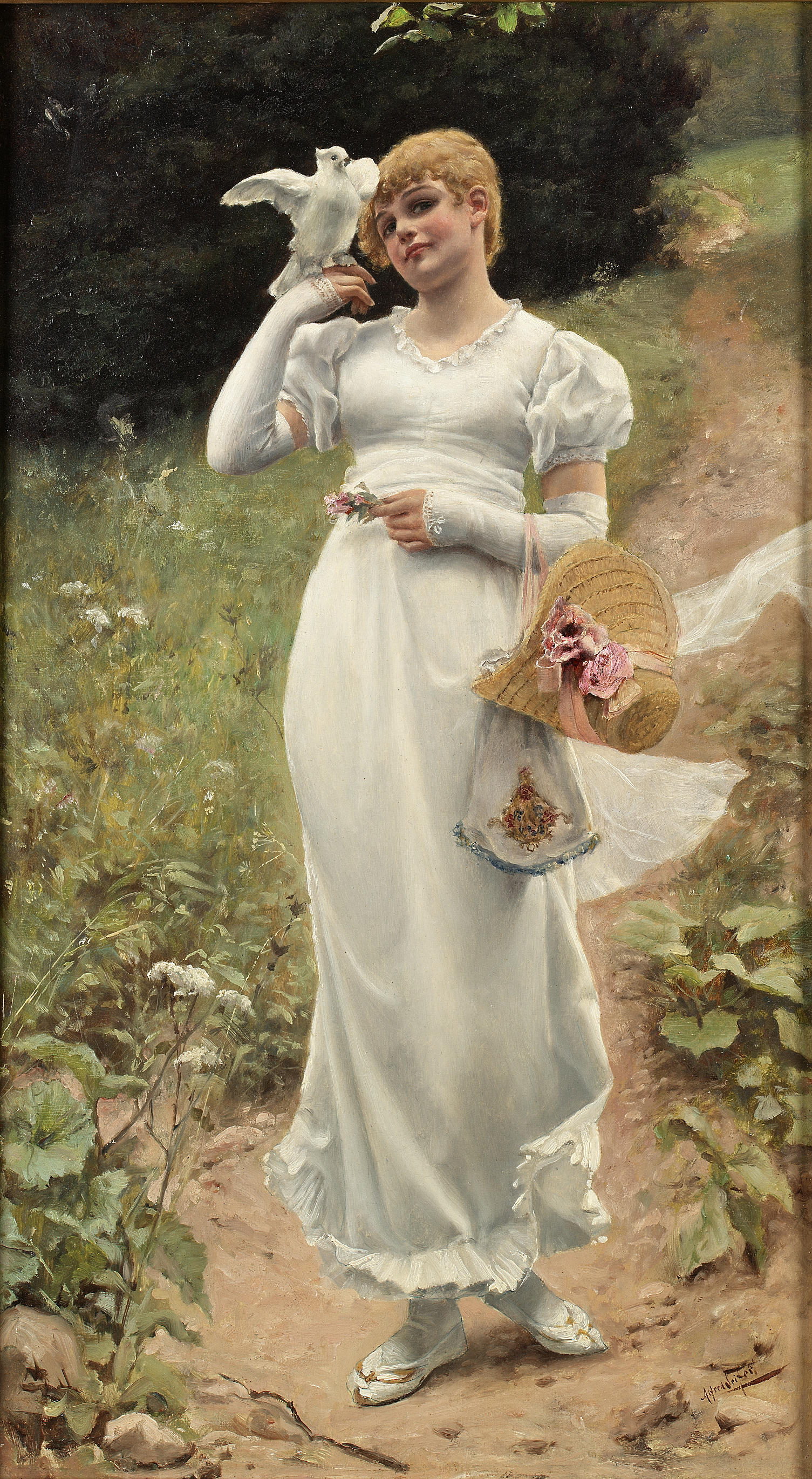
Innocence

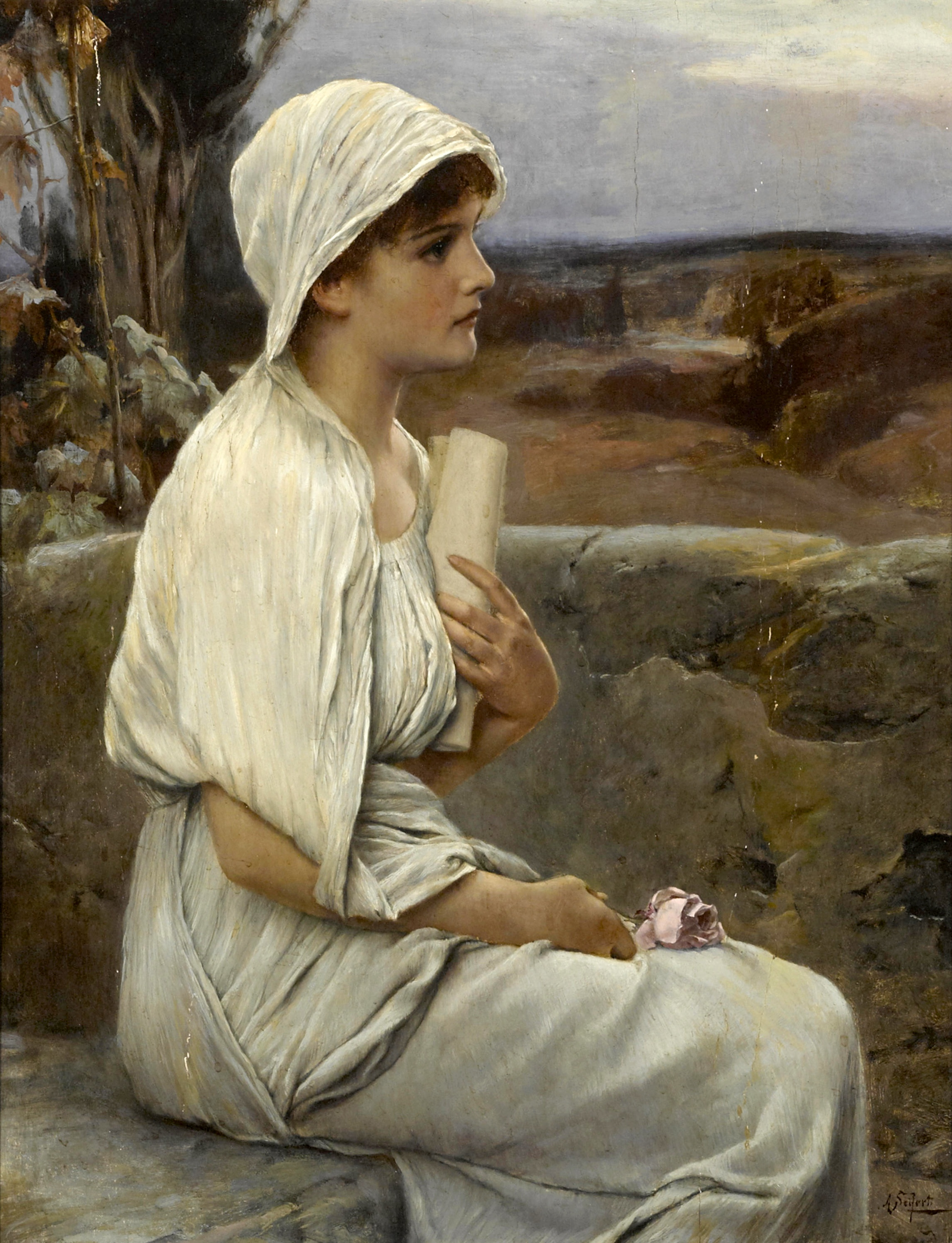
Hypatia

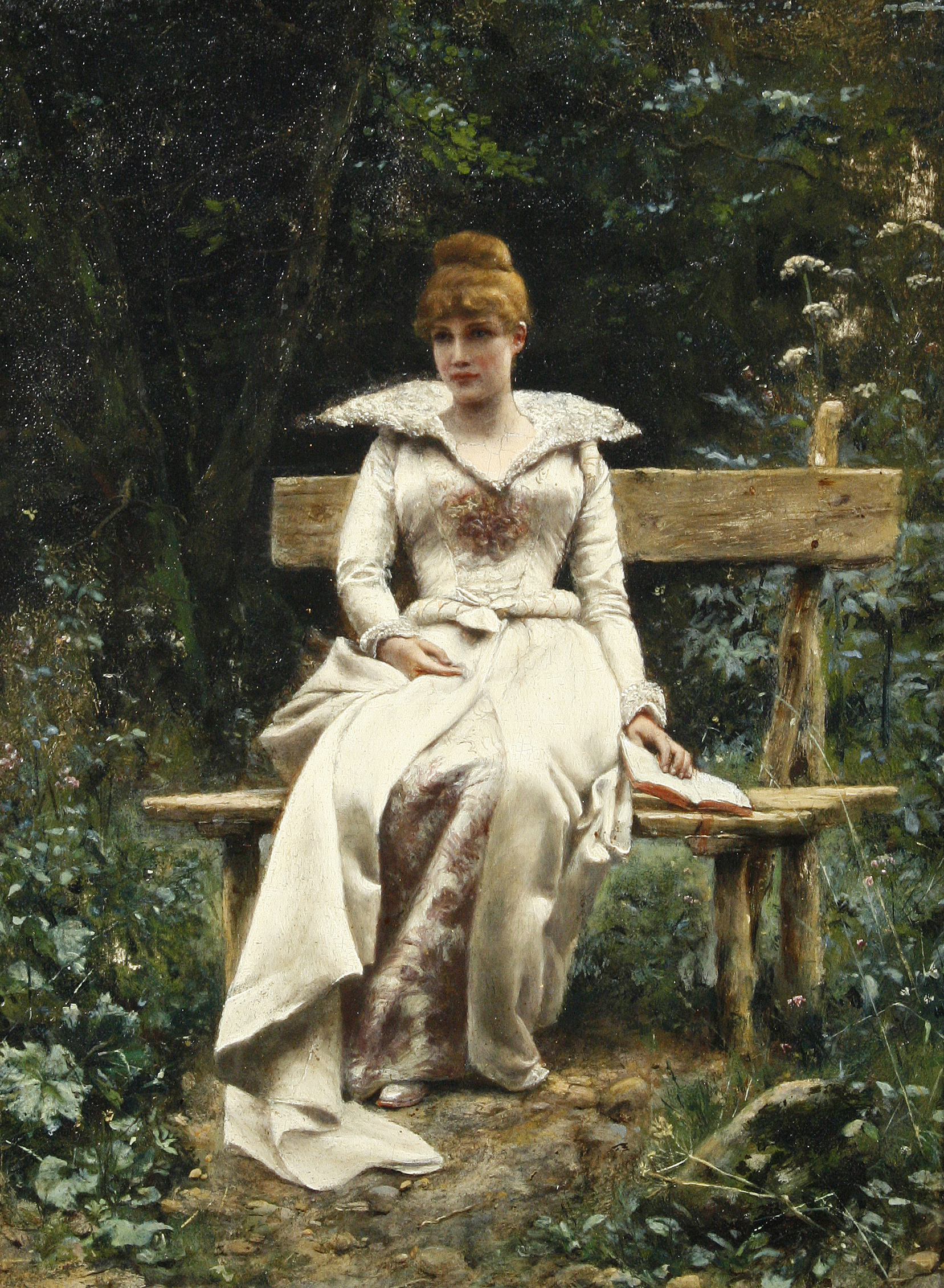
Daydreaming

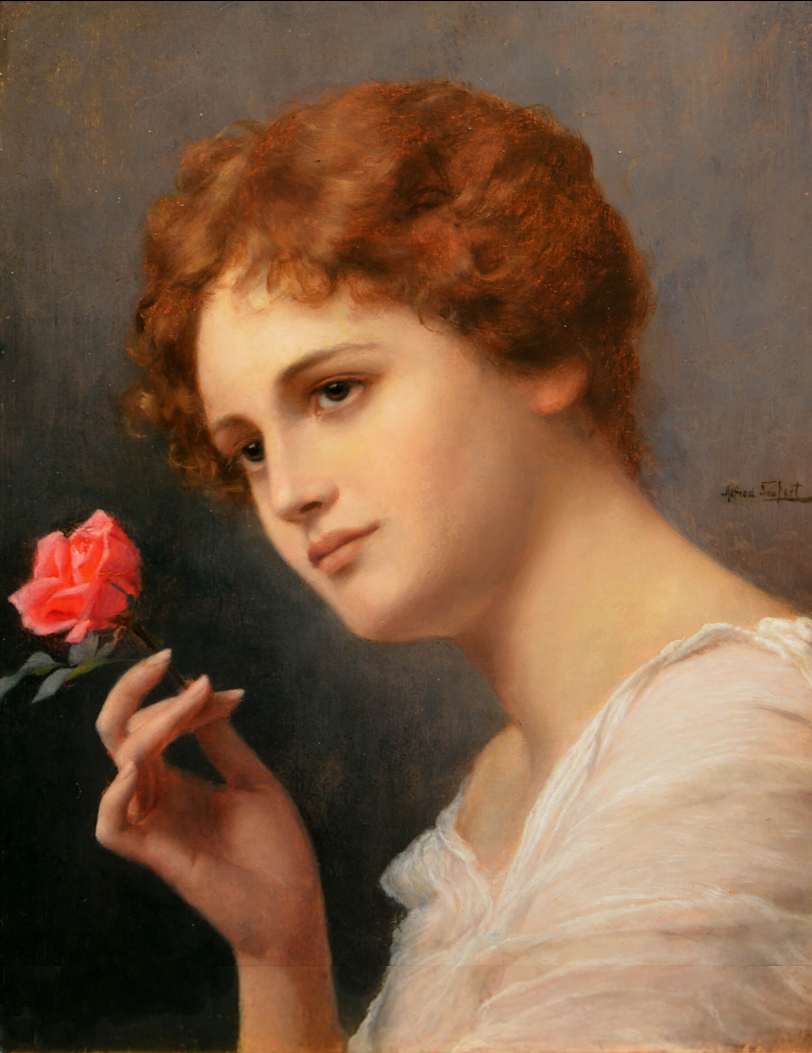
Female Portrait with Rose
