= Josef Hora =

Czech poet, literary critic and translator

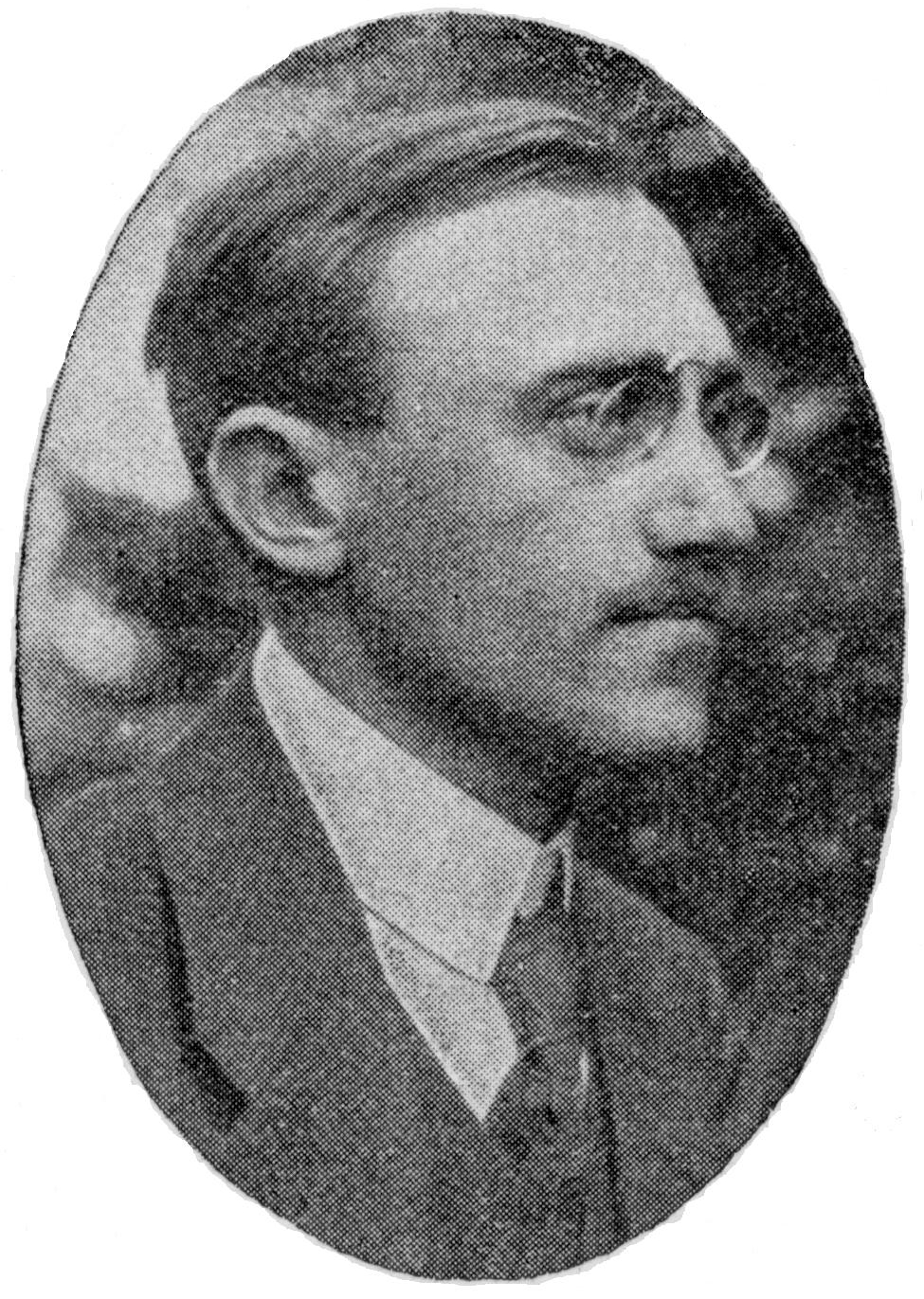
- Josef Hora
- Born: 8 July 1891; Dobříň, Austria-Hungary
- Died: 21 June 1945 (aged 53); Prague, Czechoslovakia
- Resting place: Slavín
- Occupation: Poet

Signature
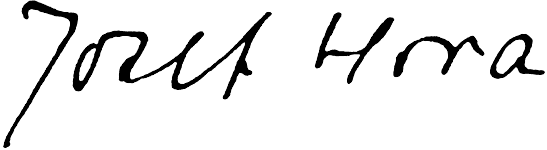

Josef Hora (8 July 1891 – 21 June 1945) was a Czech poet, literary critic and translator.

== Biography ==
=== Early life ===
Josef Hora was born in Dobříň, Litoměřice District, Bohemia in a farmstead, which now houses the Museum of Josef Hora. His father soon sold the house in the village and the family moved to Prague. In 1896, his parents broke up and Josef with his mother returned first to Dobříň and then to Roudnice where Josef studied at a gymnasium. Here he tried to write poetry and he even published his experiments in a ladies´ magazine. In 1910, he was enrolled at the Law Faculty of Charles University in Prague. He joined the social democratic party in 1912 and started writing for its papers and magazines. He became an editor of a local paper where he met Zdenka Janoušková. He married her in 1919 and they had a daughter.

=== Communist career and the schism from the Party ===
After graduating from a university (1916) with the help of Ivan Olbracht, he started work for Právo lidu (a major social democratic newspaper) and later for Rudé právo (a newly established communist newspaper) and became a member of the KSČ. As an editor of the cultural section of Rudé právo he helped a lot of young talented poets and writers not only publish their work but also find jobs or accommodation in Prague. He made a trip to the USSR in 1925 that showed him not only the successes of the new regime (he was part of a delegation) but also its problems with democracy. Hora stopped writing proletarian poetry and in 1929 he and several other Czech writers (Jaroslav Seifert, Vladislav Vančura, S.K. Neumann, Marie Majerová, Ivan Olbracht and his wife Helena Malířová) expressed disapproval with the new Stalinist leadership of Klement Gottwald. They were all expelled from the party and set at variance with ten other left-wing authors (among them Vítězslav Nezval, Karel Konrád, Julius Fučík and Jiří Weil). Josef Hora wrote an essay about the situation called Literature and Politics.

=== 1930s, against Nazism and Hora's death ===
In 1933, Hora became an editor of the cultural pages of the České slovo newspaper and he also edited several literary journals. He was elected president of the Society of Czech Writers in 1934 and worked against the fascist menace from outside and inside. He travelled a lot in the 1930s (Estonia, Slovakia, Hungary, Slovenia). In 1938, he was one of the initiators of the petition Věrni zůstaneme! eventually signed by more than a million people. Just after Munich Agreement he became a co-author of a manifest To All the Civilised World (Celému civilizovanému světu). He was one of the seven funeral orators above the coffin of Karel Čapek. He exchanged more conservative Jaroslav Durych as a president of the Literary department of Art Forum and from his post helped many people afflicted with war, especially during Heydrich′s protectorship risking his life. In 1939, he wrote to a resistance magazine under the name of Jan Víra. In 1941, he withdrew from public life partly due to intensive intervention of Nazi censorship in the Czech press and partly due to his illness. Josef Hora died shortly after the liberation of Czechoslovakia in Prague at the age of 53 and was buried in Slavín.

=== Legacy ===
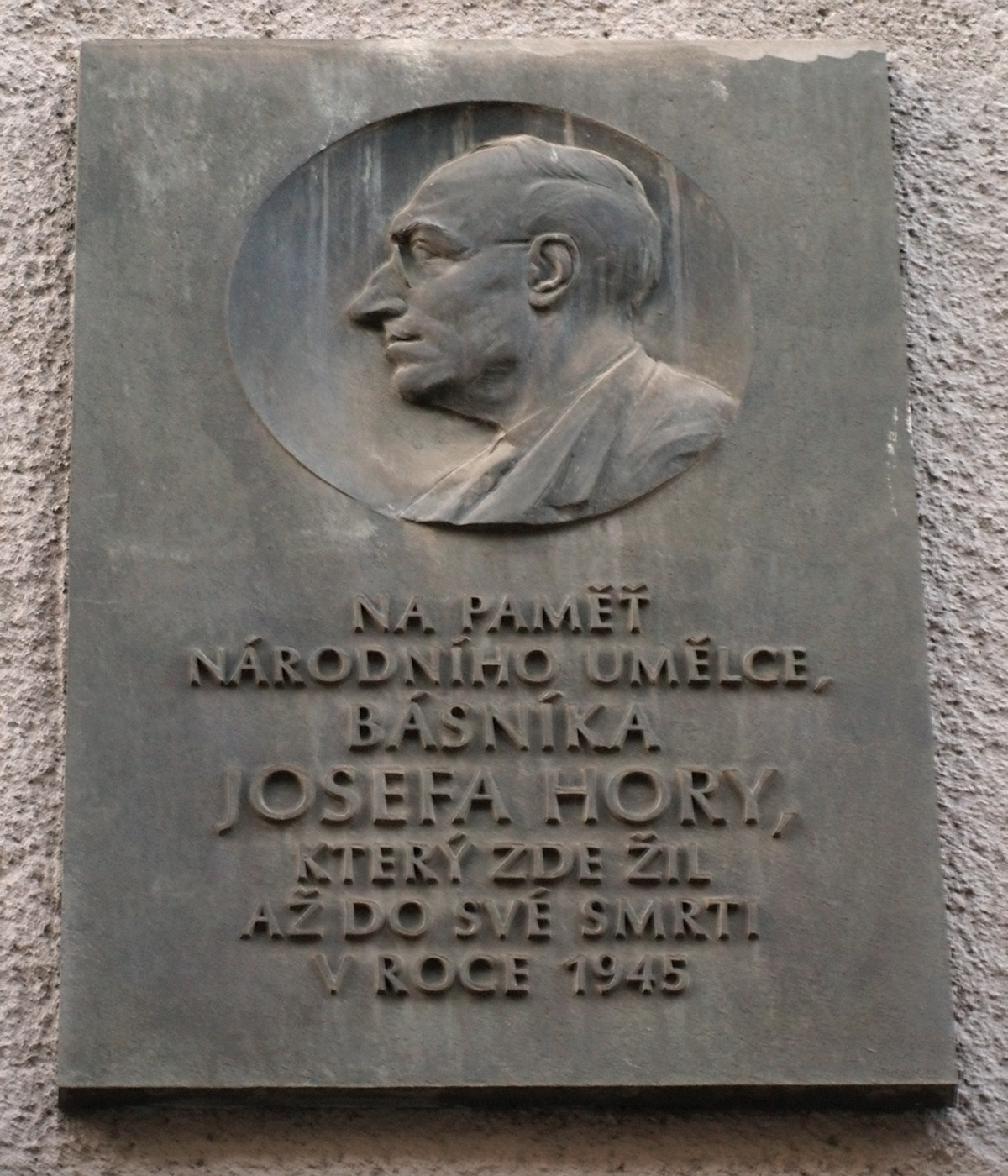
Memorial plaque of Josef Hora on his house in Prague where he lived until his death

A day after his death, Josef Hora was nominated as National Artist (a title that had been granted only to living artists since 1932) and became the first to be awarded posthumously. He was counted among Communist writers in Czechoslovakia (1948–1989) and his disillusionment with Stalinism was concealed.

== List of major works ==
=== Poetry ===
His work created a link with Czech prewar modernism, closely associated with the literary trends of its time. He always stood apart the modern -isms and literary groups such as Devětsil.

- Básně – 1915
- Strom v květu – 1920
- Itálie – 1925
- Struny ve větru – 1927
- Mít křídla – 1928
- Tvůj hlas – 1930
- Tonoucí stíny – 1933
- Dvě minuty ticha – 1934
- Tiché poselství – 1936
- Máchovská variace – 1936
- Domov – 1938
- Jan houslista – 1939

=== Prose ===
- Hladový rok – 1926
- Socialistické naděje – 1922
- Dech na skle – 1938

=== Translation ===
Alexander Pushkin, Mikhail Lermontov, Sergey Yesenin, Maxim Gorky, Ilya Erenburg, Leo Tolstoy, Johann Wolfgang Goethe

== A sample of Hora's poetry ==
"Christ at the parting of the ways" is a poem from the collection Strom v květu ("A Tree in Blossom") published in 1920 which established the author's reputation.

Kristus na rozcestí

Christ at the Parting of the Ways

Jdou semo tamo. Každý jde někam.
V každém je nějaké úsilí.
A já tu visím. Já v hloží tu čekám
na ty, kdo ke mně se uchýlí.

They go here and there. Each with a fate.
Each at their own pace.
And I am hanging here in thorns to wait
If any of them comes and prays.

Všude a všude jsou trápení velká.
Shrbeni, podryti, jdou kolem mne:
Dělník, obchodník, učitel, selka,
cizí si v bolesti vzájemné.

Each of the passers-by has a different life
So often hard to live:
A worker, a tradesman, a teacher, a farmer's wife
All foreigners in grief.

Přejdou, zajdou, nezastaví se.
Nepochopí člověk člověka.
Dávno už pokrm na jedné míse
u jednoho stolu jich nečeká.

They come and pass without a date
To get to know each other
Never eating from a common plate
Every day being farther.

Radosti, ani ty mi tu nepostojíš,
plachá, sobecká, prchavá?
Od kdy i ty se družnosti bojíš,
sama pro sebe šumící doubrava?

Joy, not even you stop here
So shy, selfish and flowing?
From when of all company you fear
A candle just for itself glowing?

Lásko, alespoň ty, dítě boží,
pozdrž se pode mnou!
Neoděna projdeš mé hloží,
silna přitažlivostí tajemnou.

Love, what about you, a child of God,
will you save the Earth?
Oh, in birthday suit on air you trod
just near my thorny berth.

Zítra, dar tvůj, přemilé pacholátko,
pod planou jabloní
tu u nohou mých snad si pohraje krátko
a mateřídouškou mi zavoní.

Your little baby in another time
here under the apple tree
will bring the smell of mother-thyme
to all the people and to me.

Two strophes from Máchovské variace (part III, 1936) present one of Hora′s views of the nature of Czech Romantic poet Karel Hynek Mácha on the occasion of the centenary of his death:

Básníku, jako tebe rve mě průvan hlubiny tvé tichý. Vězení žárlivosti tvé, vězení šílené tvé pýchy,	O, poet, I am drowning in the sea Of your soul torn by its deepest tide. A prisoner of your jealousy, A prisoner of your frantic pride,
vězení lásky, zazděné do tmy, z níž nic jen ozývá se, pláč kořisti, pád kamene, jenž prázdnem rozbije se v čase.	A prisoner of love, all alone In darkness without a single sound But weeping of a prey, falling of a stone Into the hollowness of time around.

"Shadow" is a poem from the collection Struny ve větru ("Strings in the Wind", 1927), acclaimed by critics (e.g. F.X. Šalda) and poets (e.g. Vladimír Holan and Jaroslav Seifert).

Stín

Shadow

Květ, když je listopad,
jenom bojácně kvete.
Stín jako ratolest
spad a rozčís vzduch.

A flower, when it is November.
Seems sheepish in the bloom.
A shadow was cast on the ground
As austerely as dice.

Poutníci po polích,
pluh, lovcův pes a vítr
a světlo váhá,
jak bzukot unavených much.

Pilgrims on the fields,
A plough, a hunter′s dog, a wind,
And the light hesitates a while
As the buzz of tired flies.

Kam jdeš? Se srdcem v podpaží
k teplému domu klopýtám.
Na vyšlapaném zápraží
tam pláče s hlasem hlas.

Where are you going? With heart under my arm
I am trudging to the warmth of a house.
On the worn-out threshold
Weeping voices sound.

Stín jen tak tak
že neporazil nás.

The shadow nearly
Bore us down.
