= Nocturnal Submissions =

Australian literary periodical

Nocturnal Submissions was an Australian literary periodical, based in Melbourne, which appeared sporadically and ran from 1991 to 1999. It was founded by David Lumsden and later edited by the novelist M. J. Hyland. Seamus Heaney — in the blurb on the back of issue 6 – said "Nocturnal Submissions is a handsome magazine, solid and worthwhile."

Authors whose work appeared in the periodical included Billy Collins, Peter Carey, Steve Kilbey, August Kleinzahler, Chris Wallace-Crabbe, John F. Deane and Alan Wearne. It was one of the first magazines to publish work by Peter Bakowski.

== Issue #1 ==
The material for the first issue was gathered in late 1989 but the issue was not published until 'Autumn' 1991 (which in Australia means the months March to May). The aim stated in the 'Editorial Note' was to present writing that would 'work both in performance and on the page'.

Contributors to the first issue were: James Griffin · Georgia Butters · Kerry Loughrey · Sam Sejavka · M. J. Hyland · David Lumsden · Ian McBryde · David Branson ·Warwick Newnham · Lauren Williams · Steve Kilbey · John Dyall · Peter Bakowski · Stephen J. Williams · Liz Hassall.

== Issue #2 ==
Issue #2 is dated Spring 1991.

Contributors were: Peter Bakowski · James Griffin · Ruth Hessey · Steve Kilbey · Ian McBryde · Karen McKnight · Jiří Tibor Novak · Ron Offen · Julia Palfreyman · Kristopher Saknussemm · Philippa Sawyer · Alex Skovron · Susan Storm · Torquil Todd · Alan Wearne · Lauren Williams.

== Issue #3 ==
Issue #3 is dated Spring 1994.

Contributors were: Peter Bakowski, Adam Browne, Billy Collins, Robert Hershon, Jill Jones, August Kleinzahler, Jeff Klooger, Ray Liversidge, Ian McBryde, Karen McKnight, Kristopher Saknussemm, Sam Sejavka, Fred Voss, and Barbara Wels.

== Issue #4 & Issue #5 ==
Issue #4 is a Special Fiction Issue and is dated Spring 1995. Editor: Maria J Hyland. Associate Editor: Karen McKnight. Editorial consultant: Antoni Jach. Photography: Karen Reeves. Contributors (in order) Jane Leonard, Ant McMahon, Karen McKnight, Peter Docker, CraigScanlan, Tom Ball, Sam Chesser, Karen Coghlan, Maria J Hyland, Neil Boyack, Kathryn Reeves, Eric Dando, Tricia Bowen, Carolyn Ball, Johnson Coghlan, Mira Robertson

Issue #5 is a special Irish/Australian Issue and is dated 1997.

== Issue #6 ==
Issue #6 was a perfect-bound A5 issue called 'Nocturnal Submissions 1999'. Carolyn Tetaz was the poetry editor of this issue.

Contributors were: John Elder, Marcel Maslin, Andrew Kelly, Peter Sirr, Dave Cameron, Kate Broadley, Alex Landragin, E. A. Gleeson, Nick Enright, Jack Hibberd, Peter Carey, Nicki Greenberg, Elliot Perlman, Lachlan Stephens, Dan Disney, Simon Enticknap, O. S. Claridge, Sam Chesser, Zoltan Kovacs, Rebecca Maidment, Ben Wilensky, Paul McKnight, Jefferson Kinsman, Kate Middleton, Greg Barwick, Jan Dean, Annette Trevitt, Mark Mahemoff, Sydney Smith, and Rebecca Law.
