= Kulhánek =

Kulhánek (feminine Kulhánková) is a Czech surname, derived from kulhat ('to limp'). Notable people with the surname include:

- Jakub Kulhánek (born 1984), Czech diplomat and politician
- Jiří Kulhánek (born 1967), Czech writer
- Oldřich Kulhánek (1940–2013), Czech artist
- Ota Kulhánek (born 1935), Czech-Swedish seismologist
- Petr Kulhánek (born 1971), Czech politician
- Vladimír Guma Kulhánek (born 1944), Czech electric bassist
- Vratislav Kulhánek (born 1943), Czech business manager and politician
