= Ziri =

Ziri may refer to:

== Locations ==
- Ziri, East Azerbaijan, Iran
- Ziri, Kerman, Iran
- Žiri, Slovenia

== People ==
- Drita Ziri (born 2005), Albanian beauty pageant titleholder
