= David Lumsden =

David Lumsden may refer to:

- David Lumsden (cricketer) (1877–1961), Cape Colony cricketer
- David Lumsden (musician) (1928–2023), choirmaster, organist and harpsichordist
- David Lumsden (1933–2008), Scottish businessman and nationalist
- David Lumsden (poet) (born 1964), Australian poet, see Nocturnal Submissions
- David Lumsden (actor), British actor, see Wild Geese II
