= Monostich =

Poem that consists of a single line

A monostich is a poem which consists of a single line.

== Form ==
A monostich has been described as "a startling fragment that has its own integrity" and "if a monostich has an argument, it is necessarily more subtle."

A monostich could be also titled; due to the brevity of the form, the title is invariably as important a part of the poem as the verse itself.

Some one-line poems have "the characteristics of not exceeding one line of a normal page, to be read as one unbroken line without forced pauses or the poetics of caesura", and others have "a rhythm, (as with one-line haiku), dividing easily into three phrases".

== History ==
Modern monostich was started in Russia in 1894 when Valery Bryusov published this apparently absurdist single line:

О закрой свои бледные ноги.
O zakrój svoí blédnye nógi.
(Oh, cover thy pale feet!, as translated by Babette Deutsch and Avrahm Yarmolinsky)

Perhaps the first to reintroduce one-line poems was Guillaume Apollinaire with his "Chantre" (1914) in his collection Alcools (1913), mentioned by Leroy Breunig in 'Apollinaire and the monostich' followed by Bill Zavatsky with his 'Roy Rogers' article (1974) in which he made clear that one-line poems are not at all foreign to Western poetic tradition, also including therein some from Jerome Rothenberg's 'Technicians of the Sacred' (1969), all of which are referenced in William Higginson's 'Characteristics of monostichs'. Another French poet, Emmanuel Lochac, published one-line poems in 1920 under the title Monostiches.

However, as Dmitry Kuzmin has pointed out in the first book-length study of one-line poetry (2016), Walt Whitman included a monostich (though a very long line) in an 1860 edition of his Leaves of Grass; and in 1893 and 1894 Edith Thomas, possibly in collaboration with an amateur author Samuel R. Elliott (1836–1909), anonymously published several one-line poems intended as a joke in The Atlantic Monthly. In the 1920s one-line poetry was rediscovered in the US by Yvor Winters, Edwin Ford Piper, Charles Reznikoff and others. Later, John Ashbery in '37 Haiku' (1984) and Allen Ginsberg in 'American Sentences' (1987–1995) demonstrated haiku in the monostich form. Ian McBryde's 2005 book Slivers consists entirely of one-line poems.

Founded in 2021, “Whiptail: Journal of the Single Line Poem” is a literary journal devoted solely to the monostich.

== See also ==
- Distich
- Micropoetry
- Monoku
- Tristich
