= Votruba =

Votruba (feminine: Votrubová), also spelled Wotruba, is a surname of Czech and Slovak origin.

Persons named Votruba or Wotruba include:

- Fritz Wotruba (1907–1975), Austrian sculptor
- Jaroslav Votruba (born 1939), Czech figure skater
- Jiří Votruba (born 1946), Czech artist

== See also ==
- Otruba (surname)
