= Jiříček =

Jiříček (feminine Jiříčková) is a Czech surname meaning "little Jiří". Notable people include:

- Adam Jiříček (born 2006), Czech ice hockey player
- David Jiříček (born 2003), Czech ice hockey player
