= Jiřina =

Jiřina is a Czech given name for females which may refer to:

- Jiřina Bohdalová (b. 1931), actress and TV personality
- Jiřina Hauková (1919–2005), poet and translator
- Jirina Marton (born 1946), Czech-born Canadian artist and illustrator
- Jiřina Nekolová (1931-2011), figure skater
- Jiřina Petrovická (1923–2008), film actress
- Jiřina Ptáčníková (b. 1986), pole vaulter
- Jiřina Šejbalová (1905-1981) actress
- Jiřina Steimarová (1916–2007), film and television actress
- Jiřina Štěpničková (1912–1985), actress
- Jiřina Švorcová (1928 –2011), actress and pro-Communist activist
- Jiřina Třebická (1930– 2005), dancer and actress.
- Jiřina Žertová (1932-), sculptor, painter, glass and art-industrial artist

== See also ==
- Jiří (disambiguation)
- Jiri (disambiguation)
