= Cesta krve =

Cesta krve is a Czech novel, written by Jiří Kulhánek. It was first published in 1996.

This book deals with two thematic topics (aliens and zombies) in a non-traditional way, which makes the incredibly readable, despite the not particularly witty theme, also helped by polished black (sometimes quite brutal) humor.
