= Josef Nešvera =

Czech composer

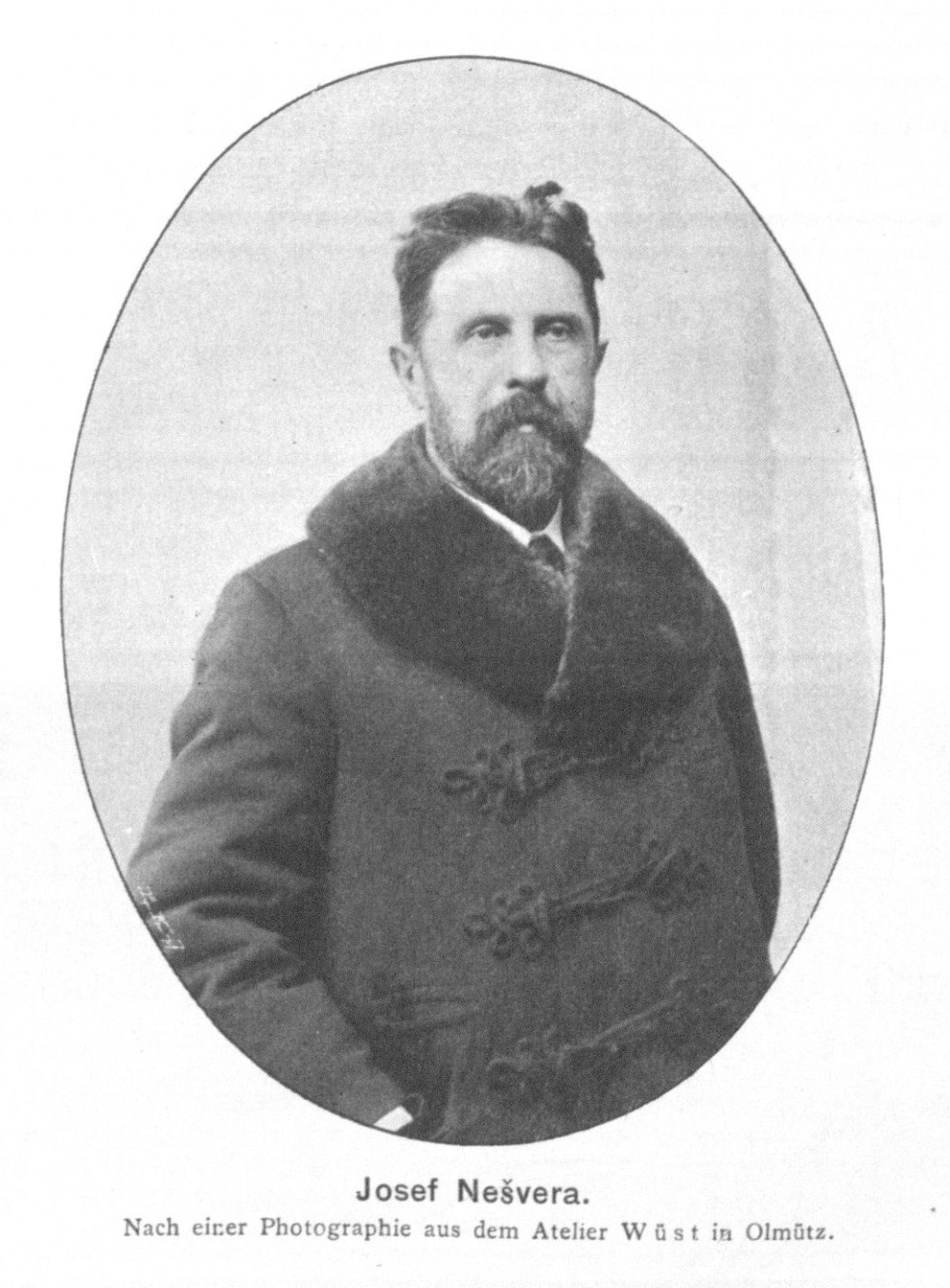
Josef Nešvera in 1901

Josef Nešvera (24 October 1842 in Praskolesy - 12 April 1914 in Olomouc) was a Czech opera composer. The most successful of his five operas was Lesní vzduch ("Woodland Air") 1897.

== Works, editions and recordings ==
- Psalm 129, Op.49 published Novello 1889
- Berceuse recording Milan Lusk violin solo, with piano. Victor, 1925
