= Praskolesy =

- Municipality
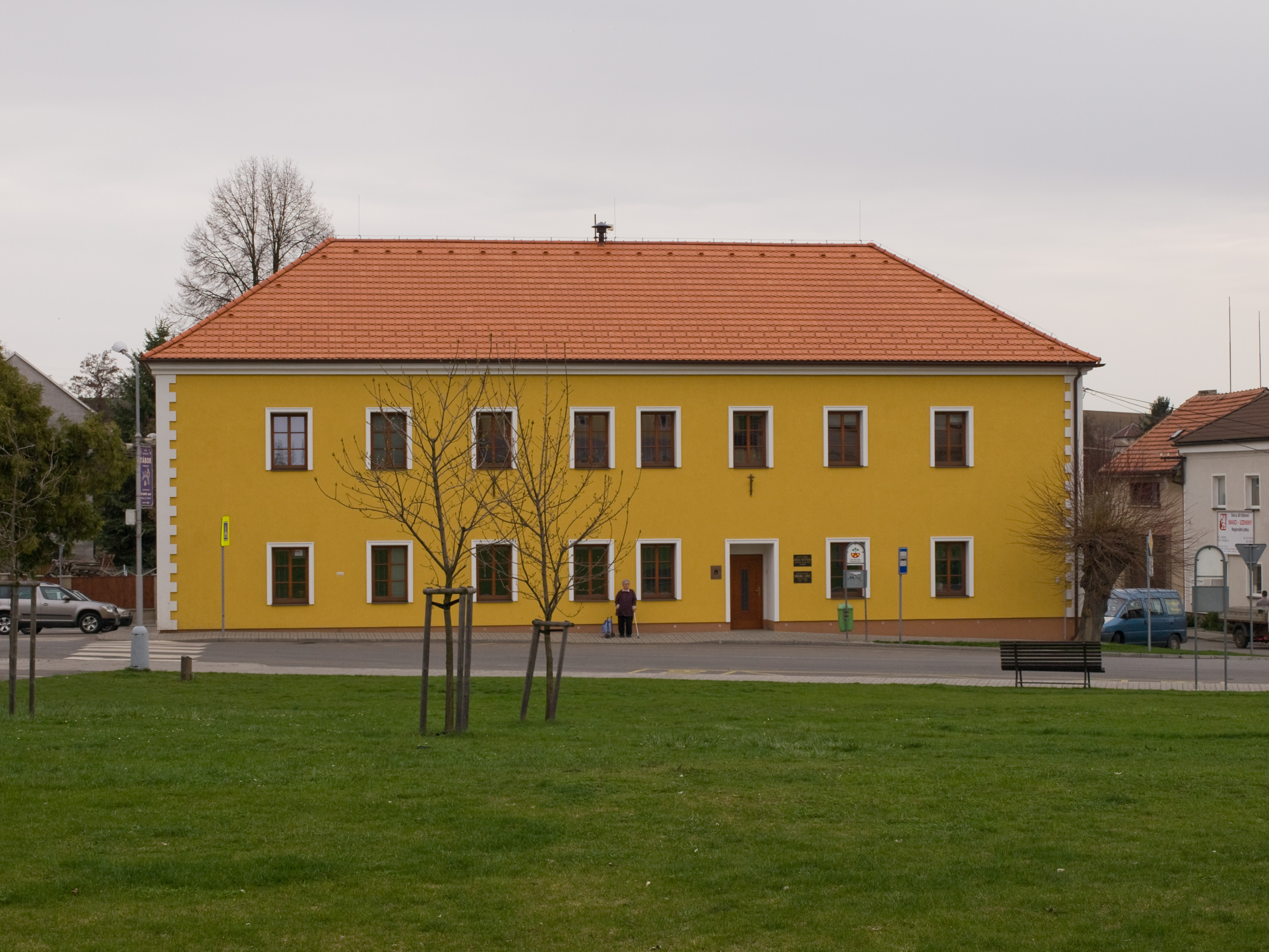
- Primary school

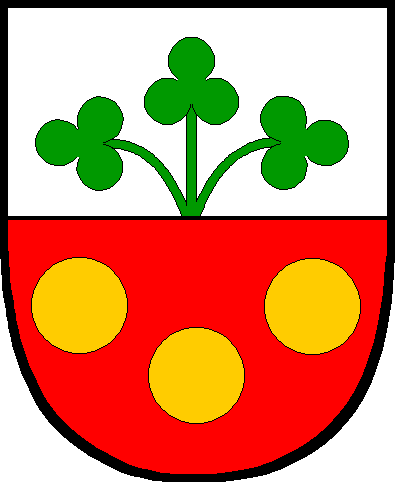
- Flag Coat of arms

- Location in the Czech Republic
- Coordinates: 49°51′57″N 13°56′0″E
- Country: Czech Republic
- Region: Central Bohemian
- District: Beroun
- First mentioned: 1216

Area
  - Total: 5.09 km^{2} (1.97 sq mi)
- Elevation: 316 m (1,037 ft)

Population (2026-01-01)
  - Total: 895
  - Density: 176/km^{2} (455/sq mi)
- Time zone: UTC+1 (CET)
  - Summer (DST): UTC+2 (CEST)
- Postal code: 267 54
- Website: www.praskolesy.cz

Praskolesy is a municipality and village in Beroun District in the Central Bohemian Region of the Czech Republic. It has about 900 inhabitants.

== Demographics ==
Historical population
Year	Pop.	±%
1869	785	—
1880	818	+4.2%
1890	870	+6.4%
1900	910	+4.6%
1910	984	+8.1%
1921	994	+1.0%
1930	1,127	+13.4%
1950	975	−13.5%
1961	1,000	+2.6%
1970	918	−8.2%
1980	881	−4.0%
1991	830	−5.8%
2001	796	−4.1%
2011	867	+8.9%
2021	892	+2.9%
Source: Censuses

== Transport ==
Praskolesy is located on the railway line Plzeň–Beroun.

== Notable people ==
- Josef Nešvera (1842–1914), composer
- Alfred Seifert (1850–1901), Czech-German painter
- Jiří Weil (1900–1959), writer and literary critic
