= Bill Zavatsky =

American writer

- Born: 1943 (age 82–83); Bridgeport, Connecticut
- Education: Columbia University
- Occupation: writer

Bill Zavatsky (born 1943 Bridgeport, Connecticut) is an American poet, journalist, jazz pianist, and translator. Zavatsky could be described as a second-generation New York School poet, influenced by such writers as Frank O'Hara and Kenneth Koch. (Koch was his professor at Columbia University.) In addition to the wry humor typical of the New York School, Zavatsky adds to his poetry an emotional poignancy that gives it additional depth.

== Life ==
Zavatsky grew up in a working-class family in Bridgeport, Connecticut. His father was a mechanic who owned a garage. Zavatsky was the first member of his family to graduate from a four-year college. He attended Columbia University, where his fellow students included a dynamic cohort of budding writers, such as Phillip Lopate, Ron Padgett, and David Shapiro.

== Career ==
Zavatsky's artistic influences include the jazz pianist Bill Evans, whom Zavatsky got to know late in the musician's career. Zavatsky has eloquently eulogized Evans, both in the liner notes to his albums, and in his poem "Live at the Village Vanguard."

Like some of his predecessors in the New York School, Zavatsky also excels as a translator of poetry. His work in this area has included English versions of the writers André Breton, Valery Larbaud, Robert Desnos, and Ramón Gómez de la Serna. His co-translation of André Breton's Earthlight received the PEN Translation Prize.

Zavatsky has worked as a journalist; his articles have appeared in The New York Times Book Review and Rolling Stone. He was editor-in-chief of SUN press and SUN magazine.

He has taught workshops for Teachers & Writers Collaborative, Long Island University, and University of Texas-Austin For many years he taught English at Trinity School in New York City, where his students frequently won creative writing awards.

Zavatsky lives in New York City.

== Awards ==
- 2008 Guggenheim Fellowship
- 1994 PEN/Book-of-the-Month Club Translation Prize

== Works ==
- 'Roy Rogers:One line Poems' article- Winter Issue 1974. New York Hospitality House
- "Up in Grandma's Room", Poetry Magazine

=== Poetry ===
- Theories of Rain and Other Poems, Sun, 1975, ISBN 978-0-915342-03-7
- For Steve Royal and Other Poems, Coalition of Publishers for Employment, 1985
- Where X Marks the Spot Hanging Loose Press, 2006, ISBN 978-1-931236-68-3

=== Translations ===
- The Poems of A.O. Barnabooth Valéry Larbaud, Translators Ron Padgett, Bill Zavatsky, Mushinsha, 1977
- Earthlight: Poems of André Breton Translator Bill Zavatsky, Zack Rogow, Sun & Moon Press, 1993, ISBN 978-1-55713-095-2

== See also ==
- Monostich
