= Otruba (surname) =

Otruba (feminine: Otrubová) is a Czech surname. It may refer to:

- Jakub Otruba (born 1998), Czech racing cyclist
- Jaroslav Otruba (1916–2007), Czech architect

== See also ==
- Votruba
