= Mendelssohn is on the Roof =

1959 novel by Jiří Weil

Mendelssohn Is on the Roof is a novel by Jiří Weil written in 1959 and first translated into English by Marie Winn in 1991. The book took 15 years to write. It is an exploration of the many forms of corruption in Nazi-occupied Czechoslovakia and embeds historical events, such as the assassination of Reinhard Heydrich in Prague in 1942, among fictional stories concerning the Holocaust, Nazi careerism and the rise of Nazism.

It is set in Nazi-occupied Czechoslovakia during World War II. The book starts with a story about some municipal workmen who are tasked to remove a statue of the Jewish composer Felix Mendelssohn from the roof of the Prague Academy of Music. The book continues with a collection of interlinked stories about Jewish life in Czechoslovakia during the war, including a tale similar to Anne Frank's. The stories of most of the characters end unhappily, with the exception of Richard Reisinger (effectively the protagonist) whose fate we do not explicitly or implicitly learn.

The English translation of the novel was originally published in 1992 by HarperCollins in the U.K. and Penguin Books in the U.S. It was reprinted in 2011 by Daunt Books with a foreword by Philip Roth which was originally written for and accompanies the translation of Weil's novel Life with a Star.
