= Dobříň =

- Municipality
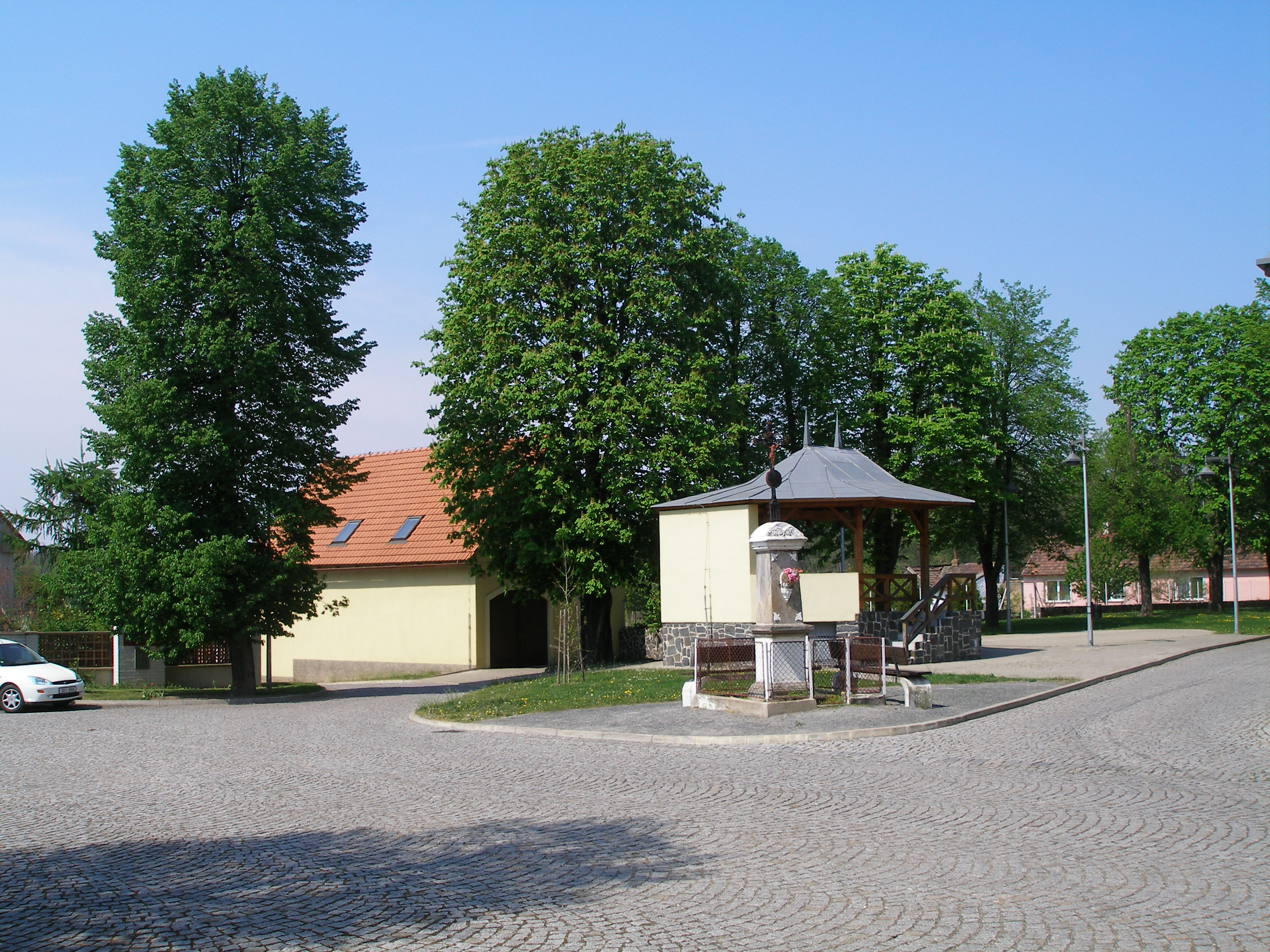
- Centre of Dobříň

- Flag Coat of arms

- Location in the Czech Republic
- Coordinates: 50°26′16″N 14°17′38″E
- Country: Czech Republic
- Region: Ústí nad Labem
- District: Litoměřice
- First mentioned: 1295

Area
  - Total: 6.02 km^{2} (2.32 sq mi)
- Elevation: 155 m (509 ft)

Population (2026-01-01)
  - Total: 554
  - Density: 92.0/km^{2} (238/sq mi)
- Time zone: UTC+1 (CET)
  - Summer (DST): UTC+2 (CEST)
- Postal code: 413 01
- Website: www.dobrin.cz

Dobříň (German: Doberschin) is a municipality and village in Litoměřice District in the Ústí nad Labem Region of the Czech Republic. It has about 600 inhabitants.

Dobříň lies approximately 17 kilometres (11 mi) south-east of Litoměřice, 31 km (19 mi) south-east of Ústí nad Labem, and 40 km (25 mi) north of Prague.

== Demographics ==
Historical population
Year	Pop.	±%
1869	190	—
1880	232	+22.1%
1890	286	+23.3%
1900	319	+11.5%
1910	662	+107.5%
1921	651	−1.7%
1930	699	+7.4%
1950	595	−14.9%
1961	603	+1.3%
1970	591	−2.0%
1980	530	−10.3%
1991	478	−9.8%
2001	462	−3.3%
2011	561	+21.4%
2021	536	−4.5%
Source: Censuses

== Notable people ==
- Josef Hora (1891–1945), poet, literary critic and translator
