= Micropoetry =

Genre of poetic verse

Micropoetry is a genre of poetic verse including tweetku (also known as twihaiku, twaiku, or twitter poetry) and captcha poetry, which is characterized by text generated through CAPTCHA anti-spamming software. The novelist W. G. Sebald may have been the first to use the term "micropoem", in reference to the poems of about 20 words in length that made up his 2004 work, Unrecounted. The more recent popularity of "micropoetry" to describe poems of 140 characters in length or shorter appears to stem from a separate coinage, as a portmanteau of "microblogging" and "poetry" in a notice on Identica on January 23, 2009, announcing the formation of a group for fans of poetry on that microblogging service. A subsequent notice linked to an example of micropoetry by another user, which was clearly lyrical but didn't appear to fit any preexistent form such as haiku or tanka.

While short poems are most associated with the haiku, the emergence of microblogging sites in the 21st century created a modern venue for epigrammatic verse. Daily haiku journal tinywords was one of the earliest proponents, publishing haiku via short message service starting in 2000.

Micropoetry often shares the quality of found poetry, where poetic style is discovered in text not intended to be poetic. A famous early example of this was Alaskan Governor Sarah Palin's Twitter feed, which comedian Conan O'Brien and actor William Shatner spoofed as poetry.

== Examples ==
In order to fit the most meaning into few characters, micropoetry often breaks traditional rules of grammar and lexicon, as in this example:

evrywhr:i c mmnts crl'd back like lips
frm ancnt teeth;evrywhr:i C the bones,their shapes ntwined in2 the
flowrs of gd's infnite
spirogrph

The form is also often characterized by spontaneous and rapid production and dissemination, as in the King's Place Twitter contest, judged by Yoko Ono. The winning poem from that May 2009 contest was written by Simon Brake:

beneath the Morning Sun,
The city is painted gold,
People move like bees through honey

== See also ==
- Flarf poetry
- Microblogging
- Monostich
- Spoetry
- Twitter
