= Jiri (disambiguation) =

Jiri is a village in Nepal.

Jiri may also refer to:

- Jiří, a Czech given name
- Jiri Koski (born 1995), Finnish football player
- Jairos Jiri (1921–1982), Zimbabwean philanthropist
- Jiri River, a river in Assam, India
- Jiri-ye Sofla, a village in Iran
