= Jiří Jantovsky =

Czech ice hockey player

- Born: July 18, 1975 (age 50)
- Height: 6 ft 1 in (185 cm)
- Weight: 201 lb (91 kg; 14 st 5 lb)
- Position: Right wing
- Shot: Left
- Played for: HC Pardubice; HC Slavia Praha; HC Vsetín; HC Znojemští Orli; HC Karlovy Vary; HC Sparta Praha; HC Dukla Jihlava; Bergen IK; IK Comet; Sparta Sarpsborg
- National team: Czech Republic
- Playing career: 1994–2009

Jiří Jantovsky (born July 18, 1975) is a Czech former professional ice hockey right winger.

Jantovsky played 335 games in the Czech Extraliga, playing for HC Pardubice, HC Slavia Praha, HC Vsetín, HC Znojemští Orli, HC Karlovy Vary, HC Sparta Praha and HC Dukla Jihlava. He also played in Norway's GET-ligaen for Bergen IK, IK Comet and Sparta Sarpsborg.
