= Jiří Jeslínek =

Jiří Jeslínek may refer to:

- Jiří Jeslínek (footballer born 1962), Czechoslovak international footballer
- Jiří Jeslínek (footballer born 1987), Czech footballer
