= Jiří Pelikán =

Jiří Pelikán may refer to:

- Jiří Pelikán (chess player) (1906–1984), Czech-Argentine chess master
- Jiří Pelikán (politician) (1923–1999), Czech journalist and politician
- Jiří Pelikán (tennis) (born 1970), Czech tennis player
