= Karl Würbs =

Czech painter (1807–1876)

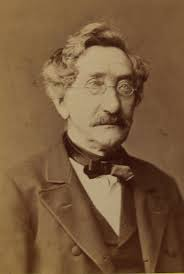
Karl Würbs (date unknown)

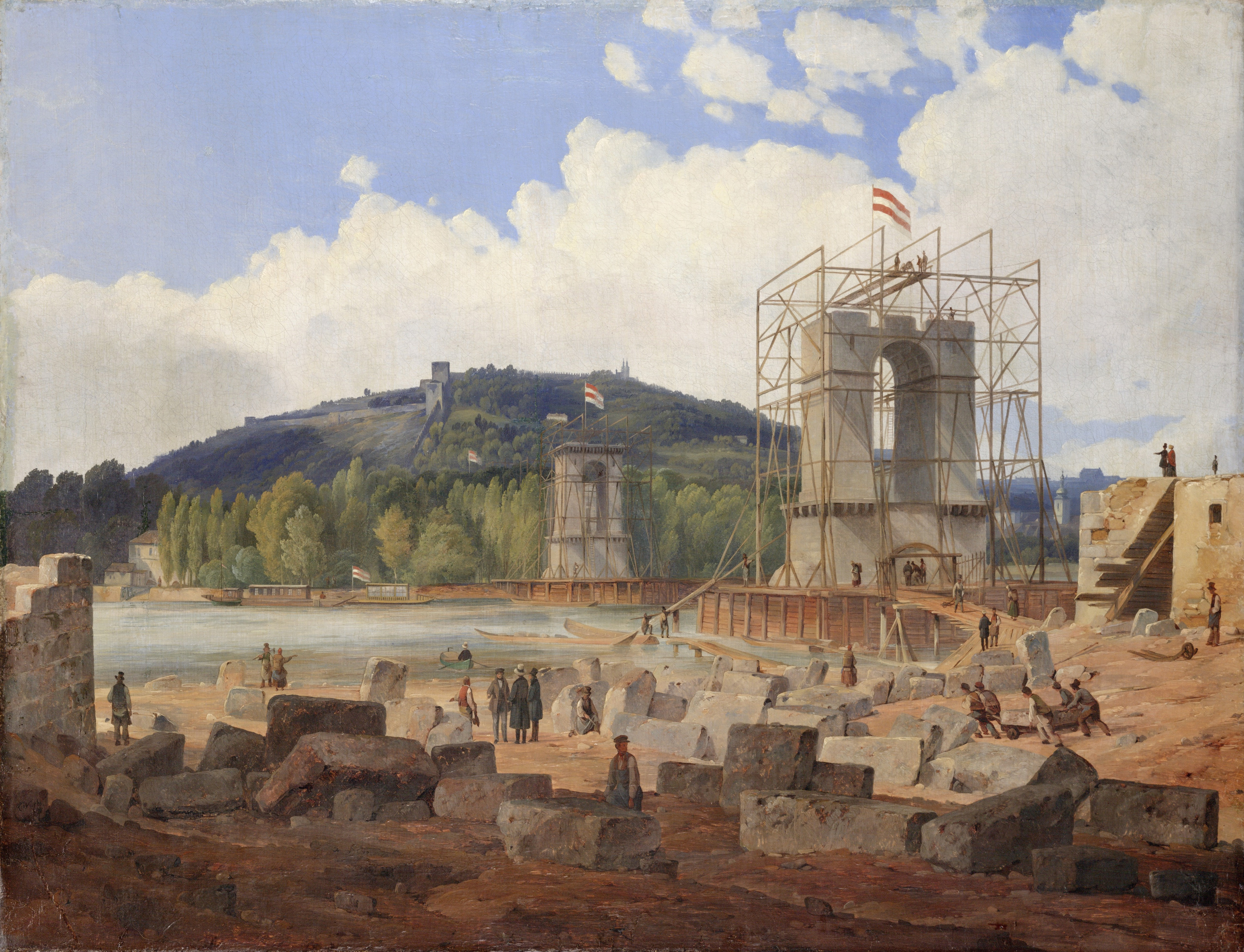
Construction of a Bridge over the Vltava

Karl Würbs or Karel Würbs (12 August 1807 – 6 July 1876) was a Czech painter, lithographer and art teacher.

== Life and works ==
Würbs was born in Prague, Bohemia, Austrian Empire on 12 August 1807. He was born to a family of brushmakers and was taught the trade. However, at an early age, he displayed artistic talent, acting abilities, and an interest in literature. His career choice was determined when he befriended Karl Krumpigl (1804–1832), an aspiring landscape painter. In 1823, he began attending the Academy of Fine Arts, Prague, where he studied with Josef Bergler and František Kristian Waldherr.

After leaving the academy. he made his living as an engraver and lithographer, and contributed art criticism to the magazine, Bohemie. In 1835, he became one of the founding members of Krasoumná jednota, a society dedicated to promoting the arts. He later took a study trip to Germany and Austria, and spent 1839 in the Netherlands.

Upon his return, he began working for the firm of Haas & Hennig, producing lithographs of vedute and, in 1842, collaborated on a major work depicting Czech castles and chateaux. He worked with many notable engravers, including Johann Poppel, Wilhelm Kandler and Vincenc Morstadt. Later, he devoted himself to landscape painting, but his paintings were often criticized for what were considered to be "unnatural colors".

In 1858, he was appointed Inspector of the picture gallery of the Společnost vlasteneckých přátel umění (Society of the Patriotic Friends of Art) at Prague Castle. He also worked as an engraving teacher at the Czech Technical University and, from 1869 to 1871, taught perspective at the academy. In 1873, he was employed by Count Thun von Děčín as an appraiser for paintings and engravings.

He never married, and died without descendants at the age of sixty-nine. He died in Prague on 6 July 1876.
