= Ziri, East Azerbaijan =

Ziri زيري
- Village
- Location within Iran
- Coordinates: 37°57′18″N 47°46′56″E
- Country: Iran
- Province: East Azerbaijan
- County: Sarab
- Bakhsh: Central
- Rural District: Sain

Population (2006)
  - Total: 168
- Time zone: UTC+3:30 (IRST)
  - Summer (DST): UTC+4:30 (IRDT)

Ziri (Persian: زيري, also romanized as Zīrī) is a village in Sain Rural District, in the Central District of Sarab County, East Azerbaijan Province, Iran. At the 2006 census, its population was 168, in 29 families.
