= Jiří Poukar =

Czech ice hockey forward

- Born: April 19, 1969 (age 55)
- Height: 6 ft 2 in (188 cm)
- Weight: 201 lb (91 kg; 14 st 5 lb)
- Position: Forward
- Shot: Right
- Played for: HC Dukla Jihlava; HC Slavia Praha; HC Znojemští Orli
- National team: Czech Republic
- Playing career: 1988–2004

Jiří Poukar (born April 19, 1969) is a Czech former professional ice hockey forward.

Poukar played in the Czechoslovak First Ice Hockey League and the Czech Extraliga for HC Dukla Jihlava, HC Slavia Praha and HC Znojemští Orli between 1989 and 2000. He won a league championship in 1991 with Dukla Jihlava.

Poukar also played six games for the Czech Republic men's national ice hockey team.
