= Josef Mukařovský =

Czech painter and illustrator (1851–1921)

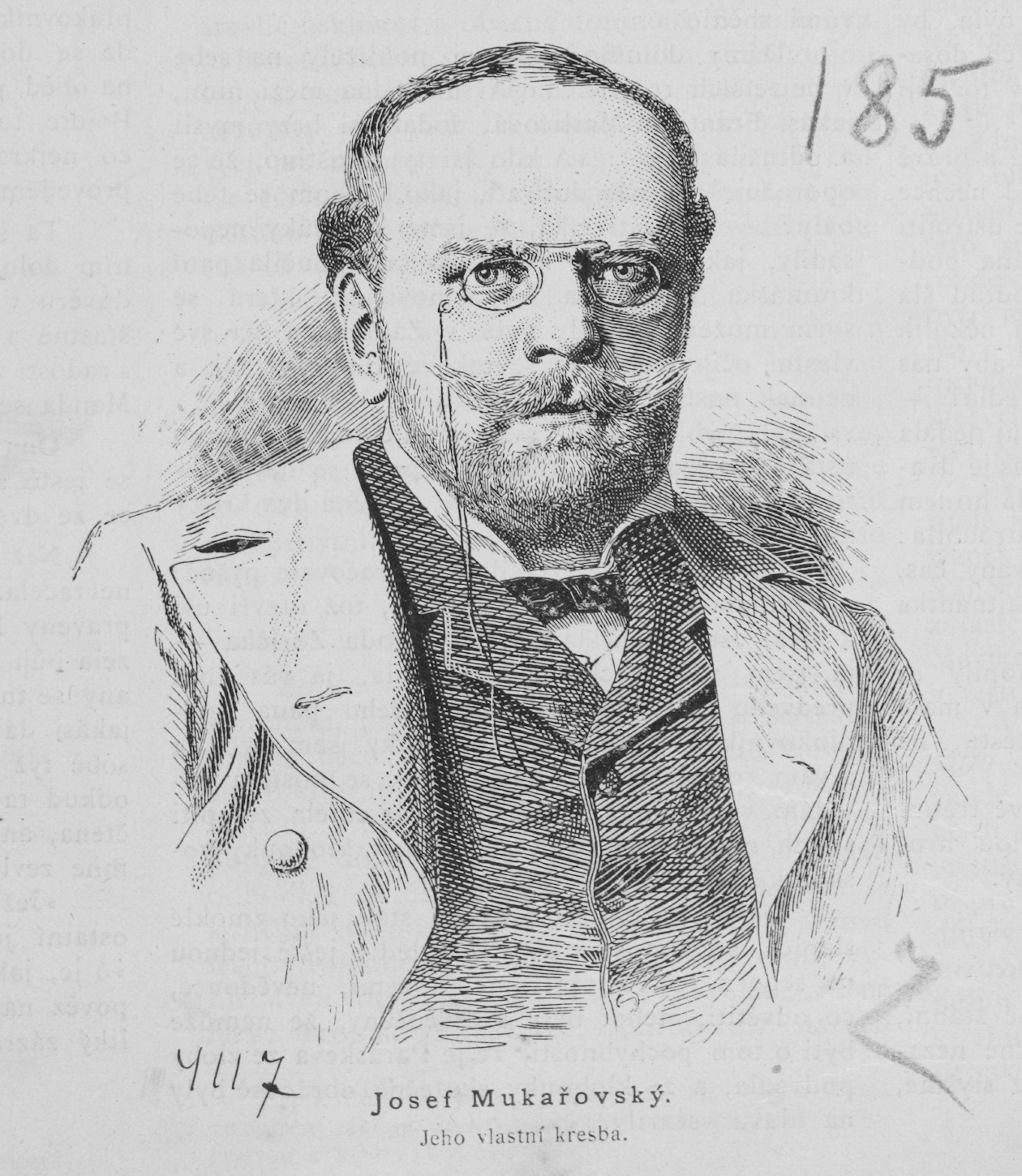
Self-portrait (1884)

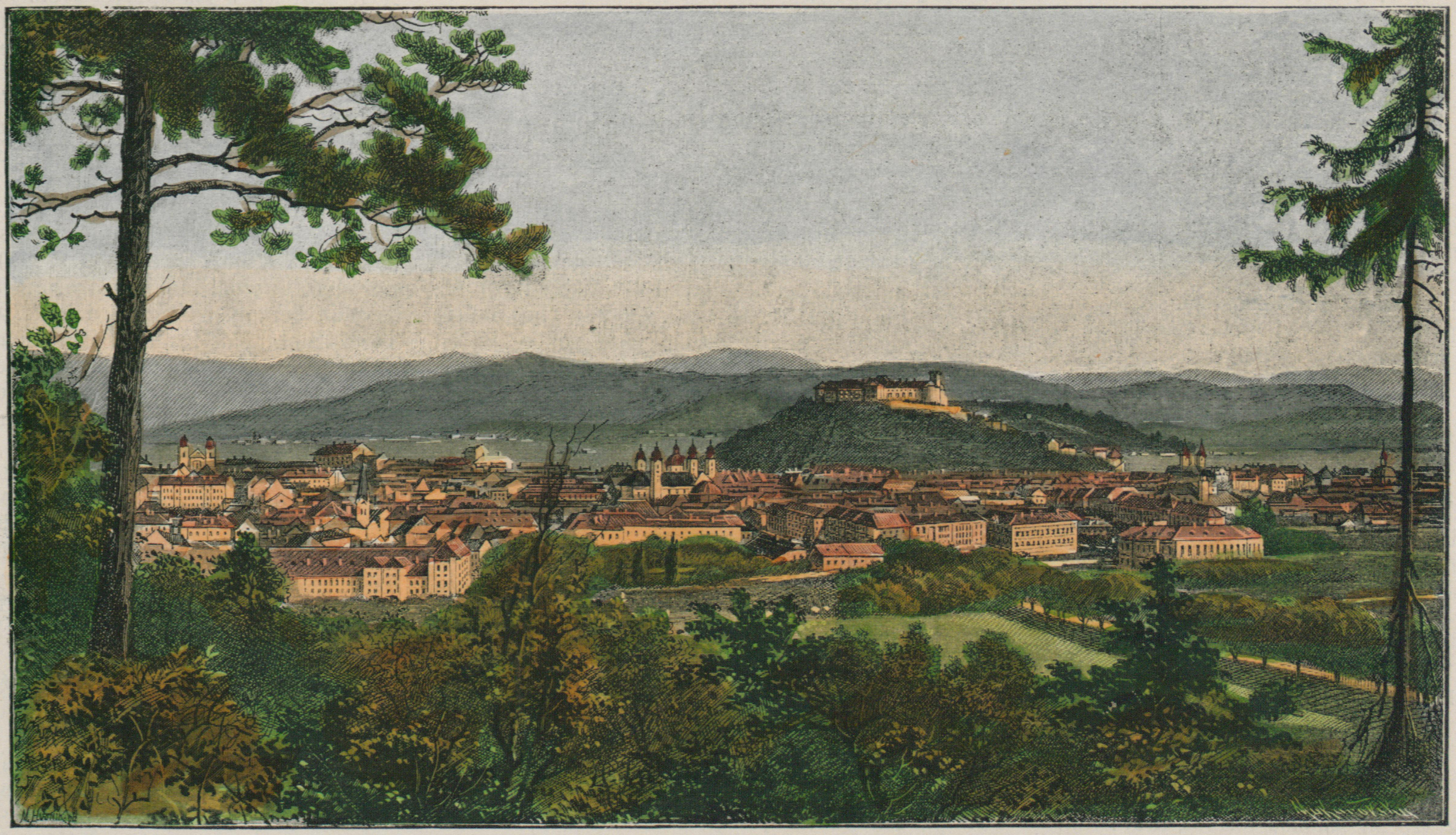
View of Ljubljana, from the Northeast

Josef Mukařovský (6 April 1851, Mainz – 1 November 1921, Klatovy) was a Czech painter and illustrator.

== Biography ==
He was born in Germany, to the family of a military officer stationed there. When he was eight, they returned to Prague. He attended schools there and in Vienna, and graduated from a painting academy; possibly in either city. After 1870, he contributed illustrations to various magazines, notably Světozor; publishing over 400 in the course of fourteen years. His other works included decorating the staircase at the Thunovský Palace.

In the 1880s, he visited Munich. He eventually settled there, started a family, and became involved in its cultural life. There, he did illustrations for German magazines, and acted as host to many German and Czech cultural figures; being given the nickname "Muki". His friends included the painters František Hlavatý (1860-1917) and Otto Peters. He also illustrated the novel, Der Sohn des Bärenjägers (The Bear Hunter's Son), by Karl May.

Shortly before World War I, he returned home. for family reasons, and bought a home in Domažlice. He still provided illustrations for German publications until the war interfered. After the war, he concentrated on doing portraits of the local people. Unaffected by modern trends, his work continued to be of a practical nature. He died in a local hospital and was interred at the Municipal Cemetery. He was remembered as a happy, pleasant person.
