= Ota Kulhánek =

Czech seismologist (born 1935)

Ota Kulhánek (born 23 July 1935) is a Czech seismologist who currently resides in Uppsala, Sweden, where he is emeritus professor of geophysics at Uppsala University.

He is also the author of the book Anatomy of Seismograms, released in 1990.
