= Jiří Bobok =

Czech footballer

Personal information
- Full name: Jiří Bobok
- Date of birth: 1 March 1977 (age 49)
- Place of birth: Prague, Czechoslovakia
- Height: 1.90 m (6 ft 3 in)
- Position: Goalkeeper

Youth career
- Sparta Prague

Senior career*
Years	Team	Apps	(Gls)
1995–1997	Sparta Prague	0	(0)
1997–1998	→ FK PS Přerov (loan)		
2000–2001	→SK Spolana Neratovice (loan)		
2001–2002	Sparta Prague	0	(0)
2002–2005	SFC Opava	13	(0)
2005–2008	FK Jablonec 97	3	(0)
2008–2009	AEK Larnaca	4	(0)
- * Club domestic league appearances and goals

Jiří Bobok (born 1 March 1977) is a goalkeeper from Czech Republic who played in the Gambrinus Liga for SFC Opava and FK Jablonec 97. He also spent time with clubs including AC Sparta Prague, FK Chmel Blšany, SK Spolana Neratovice.
