= Jiří Vaněk =

Jiří Vaněk may refer to:

- Jiří Vaněk (rower), Czechoslovak competitor
- Jiří Vaněk (tennis) (born 1978)
- Jiří Vaněk (scientist), described Bornholmaspis in 1983
