= Alois Kirnig =

Czech painter and illustrator (1840–1911)

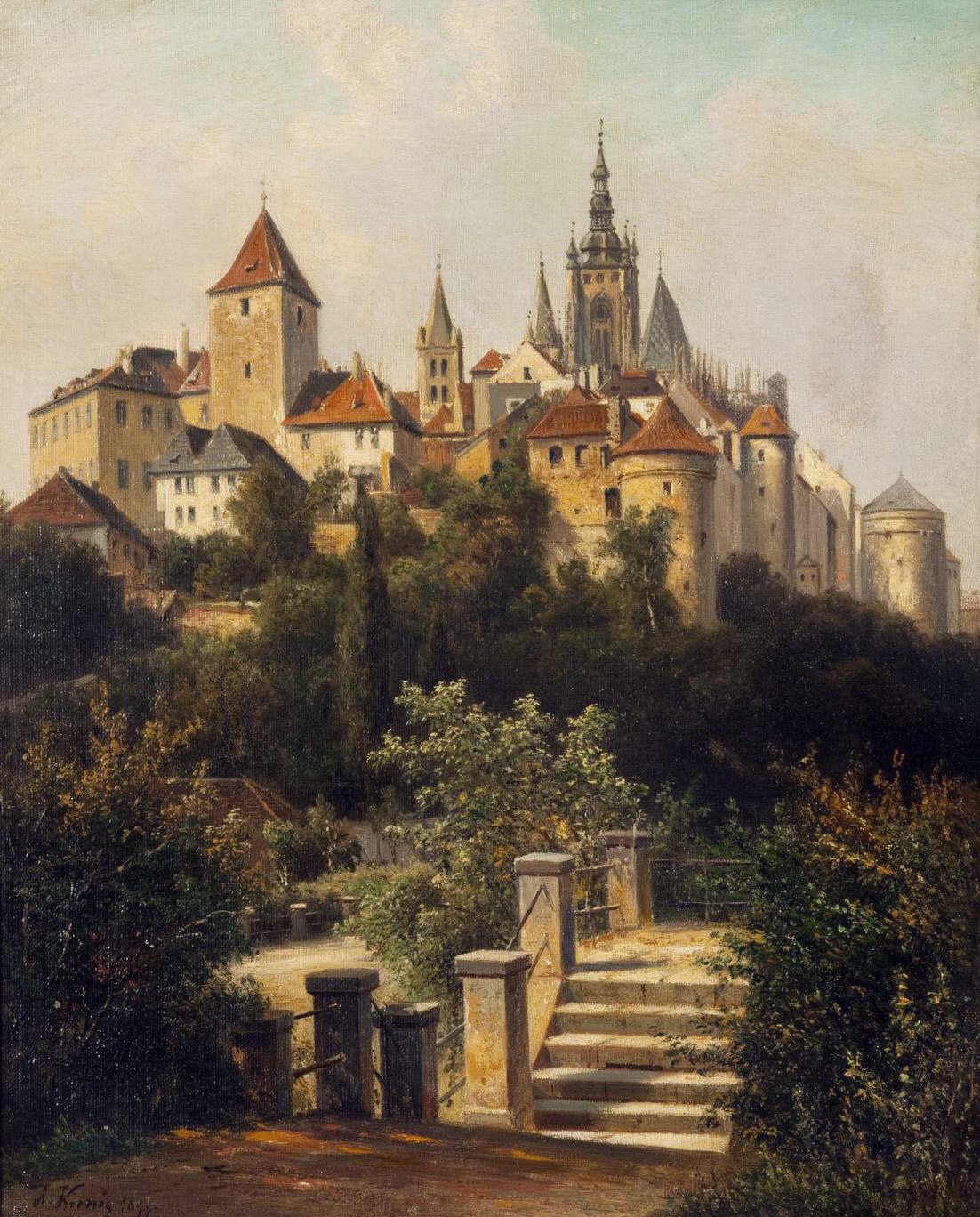
View of Prague Castle from Chotkova Road

Alois Kirnig (10 June 1840 – 25 January 1911) was a Czech painter and illustrator.

== Life and work ==
Kirnig was born in Prague on 10 June 1840. In 1854, he began by taking private lessons from Ferdinand Lepié, then attended the Academy of Fine Arts, Prague, where he studied landscape painting with Max Haushofer. After graduating in 1862, he continued his studies at the Academy of Fine Arts Munich with Eduard Schleich. In 1865, he returned to Prague and worked with Haushofer for another year. At that time, his initial Romantic approach gave way to more realistic depictions.

In 1866, he founded his own landscape painting school. His notable students included Václav Pokorný (1851-1940), Cuno von Bodenhausen and Robert Guttmann. He was also a member of Krasoumná jednota, an art promotion society, and Umělecká beseda, a creative artists' forum. From 1877 to 1879, he lived and painted in Naples and Capri. His time there lightened his palette and led to some works that are reminiscent of early impressionism. In addition to Prague, he exhibited in Vienna, Dresden and Munich.

He also created numerous illustrations; primarily for the magazine, Květy.

Kirnig died in Prague on 25 January 1911, aged 70.
