= Jiri-ye Sofla =

Jiri-ye Sofla جيري سفلي
- Village
- Location within Iran
- Coordinates: 30°25′34″N 49°42′42″E
- Country: Iran
- Province: Khuzestan
- County: Hendijan
- Bakhsh: Cham Khalaf-e Isa
- Rural District: Cham Khalaf-e Isa

Population (2006)
  - Total: 339
- Time zone: UTC+3:30 (IRST)
  - Summer (DST): UTC+4:30 (IRDT)

Jiri-ye Sofla (Persian: جيري سفلي, also Romanized as Jīrī-ye Soflá) is a village in Cham Khalaf-e Isa Rural District, Cham Khalaf-e Isa District, Hendijan County, Khuzestan Province, Iran. At the 2006 census, its population was 339, in 64 families.
