= Edwin Ford Piper =

American poet

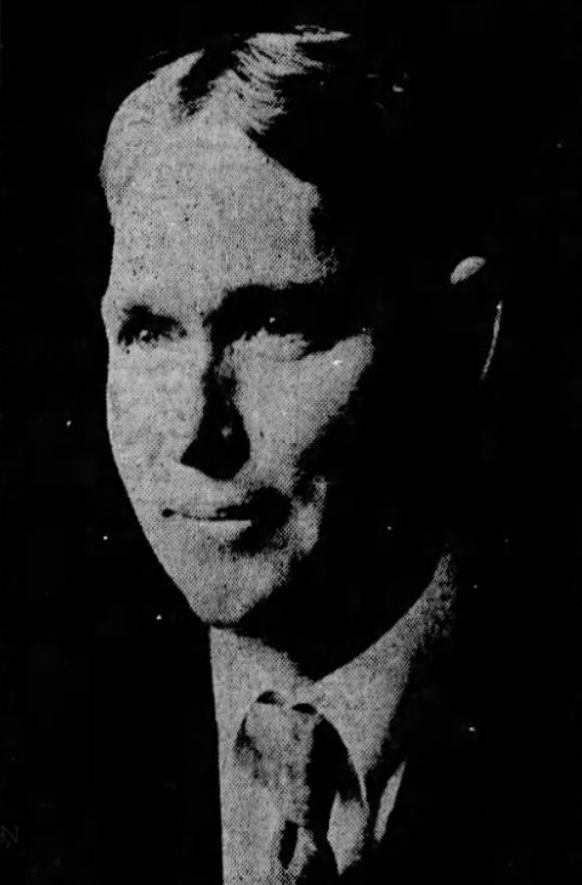
- Born: February 8, 1871; Auburn, Nebraska, US
- Died: May 17, 1939 (aged 68); Iowa City, Iowa, US
- Occupation: Poet

Edwin Ford Piper (February 8, 1871 – May 17, 1939) was an American poet, instructor, and collector of folk songs. Piper wrote multiple poetry collections. During his lifetime, Piper recorded 828 folk songs.

== Personal life ==
Piper was born on February 8, 1871, in Auburn, Nebraska. He attended the University of Nebraska in 1893, where he earned a Bachelor of Arts degree in 1897 and a Master of Arts degree in 1900. From 1903 to 1904, Piper was a student at Harvard University. He learned how to play songs from his mother Lucinda, his sister Ella, the performers who appeared at the county literary society, hired men, cowboys, and homeless people. Piper often sung to his friends. He was married to Janet Elizabeth Pressley Piper, who was also a poet. He died on May 17, 1939, in Iowa City, Iowa.

== Career ==
Piper taught at the University of Nebraska's English department for five years, later teaching at the University of Iowa's English department from 1905 until he died in 1939. He wrote poetry, and he based much of it on homesteaders and cattlemen during the 1880s. The poetry was written in free verse, blank verse, and rhyme. His poetry collections consist of Barbed Wire in 1917, The Land of the Aiouwas in 1922, Barbed Wire and Wayfarers in 1924, Paintrock Road in 1927, and Canterbury Pilgrims in 1935. Piper's poetry has also been included in Nebraska Poetry: A Sesquicentennial Anthology, 1867–2017.

Sharon Osborne Brown said in Poetry of Our Times that Piper's "two books, Barbed Wire and Wayfarers (1924) and Paintrock Road (1927), are important items in the growing literature of the west". The Des Moines Register wrote, "Edwin Ford Piper is a literary relative of Robert Frost, of Vachel Lindsay and of Carl Sandburg but not closely related to any of them. He stands on his own feet."

Starting in 1897, Piper wrote down old orally told songs, along with songs that were published in farm journals and newspapers. Beginning around 1909, he copied down songs that he knew from when he was a child, wrote down songs heard from ballad singers, received songs from those who had previously had their songs published in newspapers, traded songs with others, and collected songs from scrapbooks belonging to the elderly. Piper was active with song collecting until World War I, and he spent less time collecting songs when the war concluded. During his lifetime, Piper preserved 828 folk songs along with many riddles, rhymes, play-party games, folk sayings, and quadrille calls. Most of Piper's collected songs came from Iowa and Nebraska, but they also come from other states such as Texas and Arkansas.

== See also ==
- List of American poets
- List of people from Iowa
- List of people from Nebraska
