= Ian McBryde =

Australian poet (born 1953)

- Born: 1953 (age 72–73) Toronto, Ontario, Canada
- Occupation: Poet
- Genre: Australian contemporary poetry

Ian McBryde (born 1953) is an Australian poet, known for his monostich poems. He has also released several CDs of spoken word poetry and original music, in collaboration with Greg Riddell.

== Early life and education ==
Ian McBryde was born in 1953 in Toronto, Ontario, Canada, the son of Canadian industrial chemist and professor W. A. E. McBryde. He travelled widely before settling in Melbourne, Australia, in 1972.

== Career ==
McBryde has published many books of poems and three audio CDs of spoken word poetry and original music, in collaboration with instrumentalist and composer Greg Riddell. His poetry has been widely published internationally, including in translations into Greek, Spanish, and Japanese. He has performed his poetry in Australia, Canada, England, and the United States.

His 2005 book Slivers consists entirely of monostich-style poems that attempt to relate a whole poem in one line.

McBryde's fourth collection of poetry, Domain (2004), focused on World War II and Europe under occupation.

McBryde's tenth book, Mapless: new and selected poems, was launched in Melbourne at Collected Works Bookshop in February 2017 and at the Queensland Poetry Festival at the Judith Wright Centre of Contemporary Arts in August 2017.

== Other activities ==
In addition to writing poetry, McBryde has also painted and sketched, and spent time as a drummer in progressive jazz-rock bands.

== Recognition and awards ==
- 2005: Shortlisted, The Age Poetry Book of the Year: Domain
- 2010: Shortlisted, Victorian Premier's Literary Awards: The Adoption Order
- 2011: Work included in the anthology Australian Poetry Since 1788, published by UNSW

== Selected works ==
=== Books ===
- The Shade of Angels, 1990
- The Familiar, 1994, Hale & Iremonger
- Flank, (book with enclosed CD) 1998, Eaglemont Press.
- Equatorial, 2001
- Ground Floor, 2002
- Ambulance : and other poems, 2003, Picara Press
- Domain, 2004, Five Islands Press
- Slivers, 2005, Flat Chat Press
- The Adoption Order, 2009, Five Islands Press
- We the Mapless: New and Selected Poems, 2017, Bareknuckle Books

=== Audio CDs ===
- At Land's End
- The Still Company
- Flank
