= František Xaver Šalda =

Czech literary critic, journalist and writer

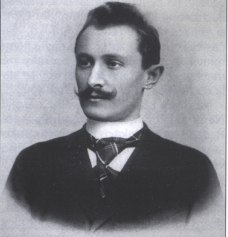
- Born: Franciscus Aloiysius Šalda; 22 December 1867; Reichenberg, Cisleithania, Austro-Hungarian Empire
- Died: 4 April 1937 (aged 69); Prague, Czechoslovakia
- Other name: F. X. Šalda
- Parents: František Šalda (father); Marie née Kleiner (mother)

Academic background
- Education: German Charles-Ferdinand University
- Thesis: (1910)

Academic work
- Discipline: History
- Sub-discipline: Art history
- Notable students: Jiří Weil

František Xaver Šalda (also known as F. X. Šalda; 22 December 1867, Reichenberg – 4 April 1937, Prague) was a Czech literary critic, journalist and writer.

== Biography ==
Baptized Franciscus Aloiysius Šalda, he was born in the family of František Šalda, a postal official, and Marie née Kleiner in Reichenberg. The family soon moved to Čáslav with his father's service, where František graduated from the municipal school and in 1878 went to Prague to study at the Academic Gymnasium, living at the time with his older brother in Vlašská Street in the Lesser Town. After three years, he transferred to the real grammar school in Žitná Street in Prague II. He went on to study law but did not finish his studies. In 1910, however, he defended his doctorate in art history at the Faculty of Philosophy (taking into account his previously published texts on literary and art criticism). He habilitated and from 1919 worked as a professor of Romance Literature at the Faculty of Arts of Charles University in Prague.

A serious nervous disease (transverse myelitis) afflicted him from the 1880s; constant pain also affected his critical attitude towards people and reality. Since 1899, partial paralysis of the body also limited his movement. Therefore, he lived alone, and apart from his love affair with Růžena Svobodová, he did not establish any closer relationships. However, he did not avoid friendly contacts in the cultural world. He died unmarried and childless. In his will, he made the Jedlička Institute, an institute for disabled children, his general heir. He wanted his villa to ring with the laughter and singing of its tiny inhabitants.

== Literature ==
He was a co-author of the Manifesto of Czech Modernism. In 1894-1908 he wrote for the editors of Otto's Dictionary of Czech, German, French and English literature and world painting. He wrote for many magazines (Literární rozhledy, Novina, Česká kultura, Kmen, Volné směry, Literární listy), where he dealt with questions and problems of art, literature, culture and politics. From 1925 he published the magazine Tvorba (a journal for criticism and art; interestingly, in the autumn of 1928, at a time when the communist press was being persecuted, he handed the magazine over to Julius Fučík, who managed it intermittently until 1938).
