= Mark Mahemoff =

Australian poet, critic and psychotherapist (born 1965)

Mark Mahemoff (born 13 January 1965) is an Australian poet, critic and psychotherapist. He has published four books of poetry and his work is represented internationally in journals like Prism International in Canada, Kavya Bahrati in India, Kunapipi in Denmark, and Antipodes in the US. His most recent book is Urban Gleanings. He regularly reviews books in the areas of poetry and psychotherapy. His creative work has been financially supported by the Literature Board of the Australia Council for the Arts.

== Poetry ==
Mark Mahemoff mainly writes free verse, but also experiments with formal constraints such as englyn, pantoum, sestina, haiku, and found poetry, as well as developing his own new forms. Influenced by the OULIPO movement’s strategies and Georges Perec, he created sestoum, a form incorporating techniques used in the pantoum and sestina. An example is his poem 'Vowel Sounds', in which he avoided using a particular-but-different vowel in each stanza.

Mahemoff’s poetry is chiefly concerned with framing, reimagining and memorialising commonplace moments, primarily in an urban setting. Describing the poems in the second collection (Near-Life Experience), in the Australian Book Review, Oliver Dennis characterises poems in the second collection "as personal histories, recording everyday experience." These personal histories include pizza sellers frustrated with their failing businesses, railway workers trapped in repetitive jobs and homeless people relying on random acts of kindness. But the subtext of Mahemoff’s poetry is that a kind of extraordinariness can be found in the ordinary if one takes the time to look. Cath Vidler highlights and acknowledges Mahemoff's abilities as a writer in appropriating work, acknowledging Mahemoff's work to "re-present it in language with all its original potency intact". Mahemoff’s book Urban Gleanings was recently reviewed in The Australian, with author Jane Smith commenting on the unique and vivid descriptions of 'Ali' which characterise Mahemoff's writing style.

== Bibliography ==
=== Poetry ===
- Urban Gleanings, Ginninderra Press, 2017
- Traps And Sanctuaries, Puncher and Wattmann, 2008
- Near-Life Experience, Ginninderra Press, 2002

=== Selected Literary Journalism ===
- Review: New and Selected Poems 1962 - 2012, Charles Simic
- Review: The Best Australian Poetry 2003, Martin Duwell and Bronwyn Lea eds, St Lucia, UQP, 2003
- Review: Fontanelle, Andrew Lansdown, Five Islands Press, 2004

=== Interviews ===
- Malcolm Turnbull: A Triumph of Form Over Substance
