= Jiří Novotný =

Jiří Novotný may refer to:

- Jiří Novotný (footballer), football player
- Jiří Novotný (futsal player), futsal player
- Jiří Novotný (ice hockey), ice hockey player
- Jiří Novotný (tennis), tennis player in the 1930s
