= Jiří Votruba =

Czech artist

Jiří Votruba (born 8 December 1946 in Prague) is a Czech painter, illustrator, and graphic designer. His paintings have been displayed at over 50 exhibitions worldwide.

Votruba is also known for his artwork commonly found on t-shirts, mugs, and postcards in shops throughout Prague, particularly depictions of Franz Kafka.
