= Jiří Tibor Novak =

- Born: 2 August 1947 (age 79)
- Died: 12/2021
- Occupation: Novelist

Jiří Tibor Novak is a Czech-born Australian artist, illustrator, and writer. He teaches drawing and illustration for graphic design at the Gordon Institute of TAFE, Geelong City Campus.

== Books ==
=== As author ===
- Fish and bird, Oxford University Press, Melbourne, 1981.
- Vienna, Nosukumo, Melbourne, 1992.

=== As illustrator ===
- Nan McNab, Crocoroos and kangadiles, Allan Cornwell, Mt Martha, 2006.
- Frightfully fearful tales, Macmillan, South Melbourne, 1987.
- Birdman, Random House Australia, 1994.
- Insy winsy spider, Allan Cornwell, 1994?
- Old MacDonald, Allan Cornwell, 1994.
- Monday's child,
- Yeebah of the You Yangs, with the Children of Lara Primary School,1995.
- You can make mobiles, Allen & Unwin, 1996.
- Nan McNab, The Circle Book
- Nan McNab, The Square Book
- Nan McNab, The Star Book
- Nan McNab, The Triangle Book
