= Jiří Weil =

Czech writer (1900–1959)

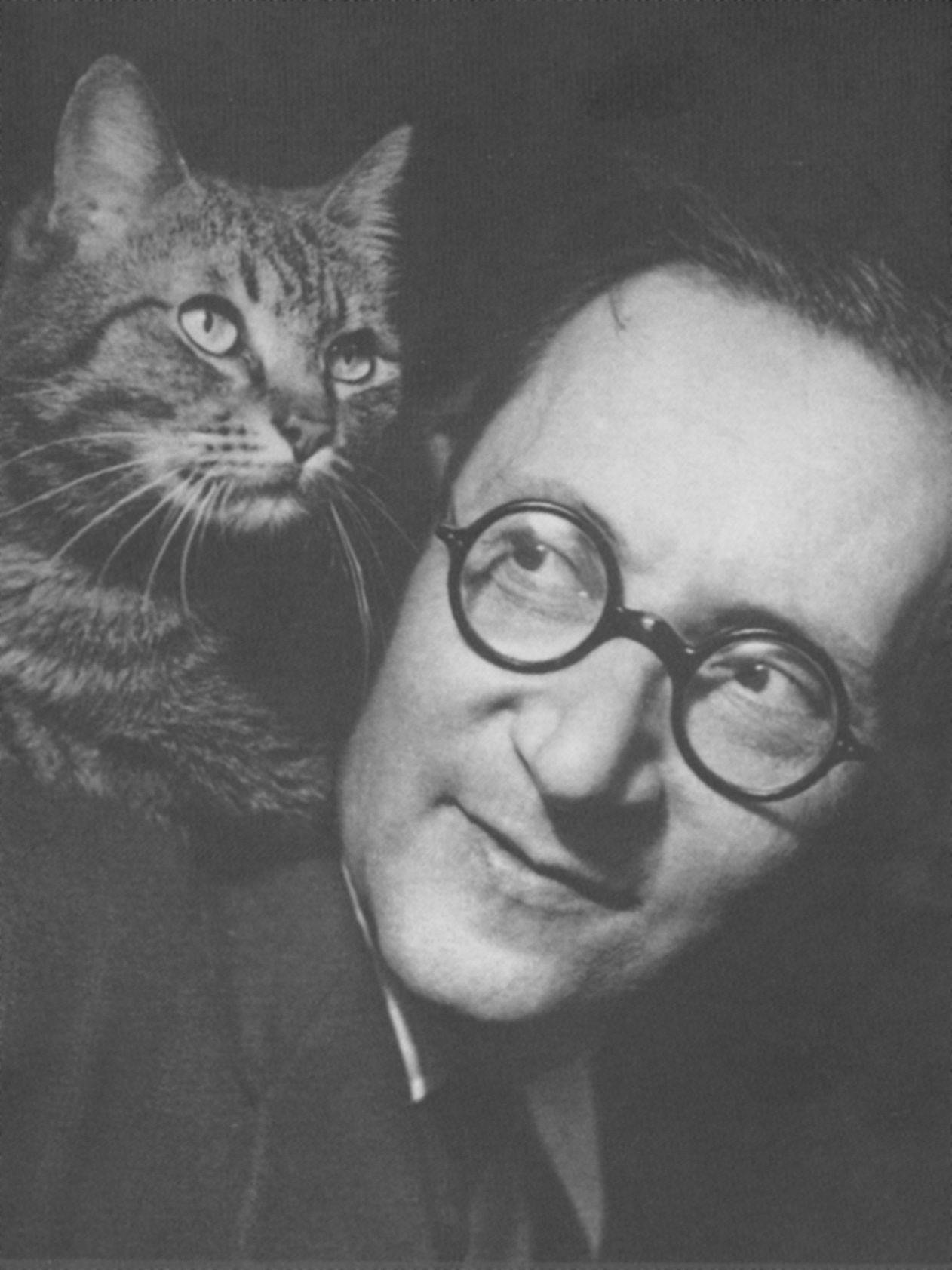
- Weil in c. 1953
- Born: 6 August 1900; Praskolesy, Bohemia, Austria-Hungary
- Died: 13 December 1959 (aged 59); Prague, Czechoslovakia
- Writing career
- Pen name: Jiří Wilde
- Notable work: Mendelssohn is on the Roof
- Organization: Young Communist League of Czechoslovakia
- Political party: KSČ, CPSU

Academic background
- Education: Charles University
- Thesis: Gogol and the English Novel of the 18th Century (1928)
- Academic advisor: František Xaver Šalda

Academic work
- Discipline: Philosophy
- Institutions: Charles University

Jiří Weil (Czech pronunciation: [jɪr̝iː vaɪl]; 6 August 1900 – 13 December 1959) was a Czech writer of Jewish origin and Holocaust survivor. His noted works include the two novels Life with a Star (Život s hvězdou), and Mendelssohn Is on the Roof (Na střeše je Mendelssohn), as well as many short stories, and other novels.

== Biography ==
Weil was born in Praskolesy, a village about 40 km (25 mi) from Prague, on 6 August 1900. He was the second son born to upper-middle-class Orthodox Jewish parents. Weil graduated from secondary school in 1919. As a student he had already begun writing mainly verses, but had also begun planning his three-part novel, Město, which he planned to publish under the pseudonym, Jiří Wilde. Upon graduation, Weil was accepted to Charles University in Prague where he entered the Department of Philosophy and also studied Slavic philology and comparative literature. He was a favourite student of František Xaver Šalda. He completed his doctoral dissertation, "Gogol and the English Novel of the 18th Century", in 1928.

In 1921, Weil joined the Young Communists and attained a position of leadership in the group. He had a keen interest in Russian literature and Soviet culture. About that same time, his first articles were published about cultural life in the Soviet Union in the Newspaper Rudé právo. He also became one of the first translators of contemporary Russian literature into the Czech language and bringing works by Boris Pasternak, Vladimir Lugovskoy and Marina Tsvetaeva to Czech readers. He was the first person to translate the works of Vladimir Mayakovsky into Czech.

In 1922, Weil traveled for the first time to the Soviet Union with a youth delegation. He writes about an ill-fated meeting with the poet Sergei Yesenin in his feuilleton, Busta básníkova. Weil worked in Moscow from 1933 to 1935 as a journalist and translator of Marxist literature in the publishing department of the Comintern, the international wing of the Communist Party of the Soviet Union (CPSU). In this capacity, he helped translate Vladimir Lenin's The State and Revolution into Czech. After the 1934 assassination of Sergei Kirov, which marked the beginning of the Stalinist Purges, Weil found himself on shaky ground in Moscow and in the CPSU. He was expelled from the CPSU and exiled to Central Asia. The circumstances of his expulsion and his subsequent deportation to Central Asia have never been fully explained, but these experiences marked a turning point for Weil. They are described in a samizdat biography by Weil's friend, Jaroslava Vondráčková, Mrazilo – tálo.

In 1935, Weil returned to Prague and published his novel Moskva-hranice (1937), an account of the purges. The Munich Agreement heralded trouble for Europe's Jewish population, but Weil was unable to join relatives in Great Britain.

During the Nazi occupation, Weil was assigned to work at the Jewish Museum in Prague. He was called to be interned at the Theresienstadt Ghetto in November 1942, but he decided not to go, instead staging his own death. Weil survived the rest of the war by hiding in various illegal apartments, with several acquaintances and even spent time hiding in a hospital. Despite the tremendous hardship, Weil continued to write.

After the war, Weil reintegrated into cultural life and from 1946 to 1948, he worked as an editor at ELK. He published a lyrical book of tributes to fallen comrades, Bárvy (transl. Colours), a novel, Makanna otec divů, which won the Czechoslovak book prize that year, and a small book of reminiscences about Julius Fučík. After 1948, Weil lost his position and the press was nationalized.

From 1949 on, Weil's work focuses on Jewish themes. His book Life with a Star, published without fanfare in 1949, is probably his best-known work. It received varying critical attention, but a firestorm of controversy over it erupted in 1951. Critics decried it as "decadent", "existentialist", "highly subjective" and "the product of a cowardly culture." It was roundly criticized from both an ideological and a religious standpoint and was banned. He resumed work at the Jewish Museum, where he was instrumental in the creation of an exhibition of children's drawings from Terezín, I Never Saw Another Butterfly, and the creation of a monument for Jewish citizens murdered by Nazis in the Pinkas Synagogue, for which he wrote a prose poem, Žalozpěv za 77 297 obětí.

In the thaw following the death of Klement Gottwald, Weil was readmitted to the Writers' Union. Weil worked continuously until his death from leukemia. He died in Prague on 13 December 1959.

== Weil's legacy ==
In recent years, Weil's Life with a Star is considered a classic. According to Philip Roth (who was largely responsible for introducing Weil to American readers) the book is "without a doubt, one of the outstanding novels I've read about the fate of a Jew under the Nazis. I don't know another like it." Michiko Kakutani adds that it is "one of the most powerful works to emerge from the Holocaust: it is a fierce and necessary work of art." And Siri Hustvedt has written; "When I mention this astounding novel to people, I am almost always met with blankness. It may be that its subject matter, the Nazi occupation of Prague, is grim. I don't know. What I do know is that I read the book when it came out – (the English translation, published in 1989, 40 years after its first publication in Czechoslovakia) – and it burned itself into me. The words German, Nazi and Jew never appear. There is nothing coy about these omissions. They are essential to the novel's uncanny immediacy, its urgent telling of a human story which, despite its particularity, refuses to locate itself in the past."

Beyond Life with a Star and Mendelssohn is on the Roof Weil's fiction is woefully underrepresented in English-language translations. At this writing, his other novels have not been translated into English but an edition of Colors is available through Michigan Slavic Publications.

Only Life with a Star and Mendelssohn is on the Roof, Moskva-hranice, and Dřevená lžice have been reprinted in Czech.

The 110th anniversary of the birth of Weil marked by premiere of concert performance of a ballet "MAKANNA" written by the Czech composer and organist Irena Kosíková, based on his novel Makanna otec divů. The concert featured Jan Židlický as narrator, the Czech cellist František Brikcius and the Talich Chamber Orchestra conducted by Maestro Jan Talich. "Makanna" was held under the auspices of Sir Tom Stoppard and Václav Havel to commemorate the 110th anniversary of the birth of Jiří Weil (1900–1959) and as part of the "Daniel Pearl World Music Days" and made possible by the cooperation of the National Gallery, the Jewish Museum in Prague, and the City of Prague.

== Work ==
- Ruská revoluční literatura, 1924
- Kulturní práce sovětského Ruska, 1924
- Češi stavějí v zemi pětiletek, 1937
- Moskva-hranice, 1937
- Makanna, otec divů, 1946.
- Barvy, 1946
- Vzpomínky na Julia Fučíka, 1947
- Life with a Star, 1949
- Mír, 1949
- Vězeň chillonský, 1957
- Harfeník, 1958
- Žalozpěv za 77 297 obětí, 1958, English translation Lamentation for 77,297 Victims. Prague: Karolinum Press (2021). ISBN 9788024645339.
- Na střeše je Mendelssohn, 1959
- Hodina pravdy, hodina zkoušky, 1966
- Moskva-Hranice, 1991
- Dřevěná lžíce, 1992

== Bibliography in English ==
- Life with a Star ISBN 0-14-118695-X
- Mendelssohn is on the Roof ISBN 0-374-20810-7
- Lamentation for 77,297 Victims. Karolinum Press. 2021. ISBN 978-80-246-4533-9.
