= Jiří Kulhánek =

Jiří Kulhánek (born 31 December 1967) is a Czech science fiction and fantasy writer. He is among the most successful contemporary authors of the genre in the Czech Republic. He tolerates to some extent the unauthorised distribution of his works on the internet.

The heroes of Kulhánek's books possess extraordinary or even supernatural abilities (vampires, cyborgs etc.); an often used plot element is that the protagonist is assaulted at the beginning of the story, then takes refuge from the more numerous, albeit 'normal', enemies. In the end he then faces hidden leaders, even more powerful than the hero himself.

== Jiří Kulhánek's novel Strontium ==
The story is set in a post-apocalyptic world, the cataclysm in question being the onset of a new ice age. The opening part of the book takes place in a virtual reality of sorts, a world even worse than what is left of the physical reality. Here we get introduced to the main character, who has no memories of his former life, yet someone helps him to return to the real world. There his mind is placed into a "super-body". The hero is solitary, and if he does make attachments to other people, then they die soon. The main story arc is filled with blood, ice, bullets, gore and black humour, which forms the main premise of the book. Yet the question still remains: What is true, and what is false?

== Novels ==
- Vládci strachu ("Rulers of Fear"), 1995
- Cesta krve ("Blood Path"), in two parts: Část I - Dobrák ("Part I - Good Guy"), 1996 and Část II - Cynik ("Part II - Cynic"), 1997. Third part "Kat" ("The Hangman"), concluding the series and connecting them to Divocí a zlí was not written by Jiří Kulhánek, but by another Czech writer, Martin Moudrý (also known as Jafff), and was distributed on the Internet.
- Divocí a zlí ("The Wild and Cruel"), four parts: Čas mrtvých ("Time of the Dead") and Hardcore in 1999, Temný prorok ("Dark Prophet") and Kříže ("Crosses"), 2000
- Noční klub ("The Night Club"), two parts: published 2002 and 2003 (English translation and publication 2008 and 2011)
- Stroncium ("Strontium"), 2006
- Vyhlídka na věčnost ("Expecting Eternity"), 2011

== Short stories ==
- Smrt je nejlepší lékař ("Death is the best doctor") – published in brochure Zámek naděje (Castle of Hope), 1994
- Je 7:00, pro dnešek nejvyšší čas zabít svého prvního policajta ("It's 7:00, high time to kill my first cop today"), 1994 – entree into universum of Divocí a zlí
- Soumrak ("Dusk"), 1995
- Koruna věčnosti ("Crown of eternity") – short story about Conan the Barbarian, 1996
- Povídky ("Short stories"), 2007

== Awards ==
In 1996 he was awarded the Prize of the Czech Academy of Science Fiction, Fantasy and Horror for promising new authors.
