= 2025 in the Czech Republic =

- Decades: 2000s; 2010s; 2020s
- See also: Other events of 2025; History of the Czech lands • Years

Events in the year 2025 in the Czech Republic.

== Incumbents ==
- President – Petr Pavel
- Prime Minister – Petr Fiala (until 9 December); Andrej Babiš (since 9 December)

== Events ==
=== January ===
- 11 January – Seven people are killed in an explosion and subsequent fire at a restaurant in Most.

=== February ===
- 6 February – President Petr Pavel signs a bill that prohibits Russian nationals from obtaining Czech citizenship, even if they have lived in the Czech Republic for a long time, which critics say is discriminatory and contrary to European values.
- 20 February – Two people are killed in a knife attack at a shopping center in Hradec Králové. A 16-year old suspect is arrested.
- 28 February – A freight train carrying benzene derails and catches fire in Hustopeče nad Bečvou. No injuries are reported.

=== March ===
- 21 March – Representatives of SPD, Svobodní, Tricolour and PRO sign a memorandum about cooperation in the 2025 parliamentary election with SPD as leader.

=== May ===
- 30 May – Pavel Blažek resigns as justice minister amid criticism over the ministry receiving a bitcoin donation that it later sold for 1 billion koruna ($45 million).

=== June ===
- 10 June – Eva Decroix is appointed as justice minister.
- 18–29 June – EuroBasket Women 2025 in the Czech Republic, Germany, Greece and Italy
- 19 June – The government survives a no-confidence vote triggered by the 2025 Czech government Bitcoin scandal.
- 23 June – The High Court of Prague overturns the 2024 acquittal of former prime minister Andrej Babiš for fraud over a $2 million case involving a European Union subsidy and orders a second retrial in the Prague Municipal Court.
- 25 June – Authorities announce the arrest of five people on suspicion of promoting hatred against minorities after being radicalized by Islamic State, including two who are charged with plotting an arson attack on a synagogue in Brno.

=== July ===
- 4 July – The Liberec, Ústí nad Labem, Hradec Králové and Central Bohemian Regions and parts of Prague experience a major blackout.
- 9 July – The government bans the usage of the Chinese AI application DeepSeek in its functions, citing cybersecurity concerns.
- 17 July – Stačilo! and SOCDEM agree on cooperation for the 2025 parliamentary election.
- 18 July – President Petr Pavel signs a bill that bans communist propaganda.

=== August ===
- 12 August – China severs official relations with President Pavel in response to him meeting with the Dalai Lama.

=== September ===
- 1 September – Former prime minister and ANO leader Andrej Babiš is hospitalized after being attacked by a man with a walking stick at a rally in Dobra.
- 8 September – The Security Information Service announces the dismantling of an espionage network operating across several European countries and run by the Belarusian KGB following a joint operation by the Czech Republic, Romania, and Hungary, prompting the expulsion of a Belarusian diplomat in Prague.
- 28 September – The Czech Republic finishes in fourth place at the 21st FIVB Volleyball Men's World Championship in the Philippines after losing to Poland in four sets (25-18, 23-25, 25-22, 25-21).

=== October ===
- 3–4 October – 2025 Czech parliamentary election: The ANO party led by Andrej Babiš wins a plurality of 80 seats in the Chamber of Deputies.

=== November ===
- 3 November – The leaders of ANO, SPD and AUTO sign a coalition agreement. The new Chamber of Deputies has its constituent meeting the same day.
- 5 November – The Czech Republic's Natálie Puškinová wins Miss Earth 2025 in the Philippines.
- 6 November – Tomio Okamura from Freedom and Direct Democracy (SPD) is elected President of the Chamber of Deputies for the new parliament with 107 votes.
- 7 November – Tomio Okamura President of the Chamber of Deputies, orders the removal of the Ukrainian flag from the parliament building, which had been raised there since the start of Russia's invasion in 2022. In reaction, the opposition Civic Democratic Party (ODS) and Pirates hung Ukrainian flags from their club windows.
- 20 November – Two trains collide near České Budějovice, injuring 57 people.

=== December ===
- 5–14 December – 2025 Women's World Floorball Championships
- 9 December – Andrej Babiš is inaugurated as prime minister.
- 14 December – President Pavel appoints prime minister Babiš's cabinet following ANO's victory in the recent parliamentary election.

== Holidays ==
- 1 January – New Year's Day
- 18 April – Good Friday
- 21 April – Easter Monday
- 1 May – Labour Day
- 8 May – Liberation Day
- 5 July – St. Cyril and Methodius Day
- 6 July – Jan Hus
- 28 September – Czech Statehood Day
- 28 October – Independent Czechoslovak State Day
- 17 November – Freedom and Democracy Day
- 24 December – Christmas Eve
- 25 December – Christmas Day
- 26 December – Second Day of Christmas

== Art and entertainment ==
- List of Czech submissions for the Academy Award for Best International Feature Film

== Deaths ==
=== January ===
- 5 January – František Šmahel, 90, historian.
- 10 January – Milan Feranec, 60, politician, MP (since 2017).
- 11 January – Mario Klemens, 88, conductor.
- 16 January – František Makeš, 93, Czech-born Swedish artist.
- 18 January – Eliška Wagnerová, 76, judge and politician.
- 21 January – Petr Hannig, 79, musician and politician.

=== February ===
- 4 February – Jiří Čtvrtečka, 82, Olympic canoeist.
- 16 February – Vladimír Válek, 89, conductor.
- 17 February – Petr Matoušek, 75, cyclist.

=== April ===
- 2 April – Alois Švehlík, 85, actor and theater pedagogue.
- 6 April – Anna Slováčková, 29, actress and singer.

=== June ===
- 8 June – Vladimír Smutný, 82, cinematographer.
- 30 June – Ctibor Turba, 80, actor of non-verbal theatre.

=== July ===
- 3 July – Klára Kolouchová, 46, mountaineer.
- 8 July – Karel Malík, 64, musician, composer, and poet.

=== August ===
- 26 August – Karel Gult, 77, actor.

=== October ===
- 4 October – Ivan Klíma, 94, writer and playwright.
- 5 October – DJ Tráva, 60, Czech DJ and producer.
- 6 October – Dana Drábová, 64, director of the State Office for Nuclear Safety (since 1999).
- 17 October – Milan Dobeš, 96, sculptor
- 31 October – Daniel Krištof, 46, psychologist and organisational manager.

=== November ===
- 2 November – Pavel Prošek, 85, physical geographer and climatologist, founder of Mendel Polar Station.
- 4 November – Dominik Duka, 82, Roman Catholic cardinal, bishop of Hradec Králové (1998–2010) and archbishop of Prague (2010–2022).
- 5 November – Věra Křesadlová, 81, artist, actress and singer.
- 9 November – Jana Štroblová, 89, writer, poet and translator.
- 10 November – Karel Oujezdský, 79, radio editor, publicist and fine arts promoter.
- 17 November – Oldřich Jelínek, 95, painter, graphic artist and caricaturist.
- 24 November – Jorga Kotrbová, 78, actress (Princess Goldilocks, Honza málem králem, Utrpení mladého Boháčka).

=== December ===
- 3 December – Theodor Pištěk, 93, artist and costume designer (Amadeus, Valmont, The People vs. Larry Flynt), Oscar winner (1984).
- 5 December – Patrik Hezucký, 55, radio presenter.
- 8 December – Jaroslav Kubín, 78, politician, senator (2000–2006), member of the Zlín Regional Assembly (2000–2004, 2008–2012).
- 18 December – Miroslav Vondřička, 92, basketball coach (women's national team).

== See also ==
- 2025 in the European Union
- 2025 in Europe
