= 2023 in the Czech Republic =

- Decades: 2000s; 2010s; 2020s
- See also: Other events of 2023; History of the Czech lands • Years

Events in the year 2023 in the Czech Republic.

== Incumbents ==
- President – Miloš Zeman (until March 8); Petr Pavel onwards
- Prime Minister – Petr Fiala

== Events ==
=== January ===
- 9 January – Prague's municipal court acquitted Andrej Babiš of charges of subsidy fraud.
- 13 January – 2023 Czech presidential election: Czechs elect their president. Incumbent Miloš Zeman is not eligible to run for re-election, as he is term limited.
- 27 January – 2023 Czech presidential election: Czechs vote in the second round of the presidential election.
- 28 January – The Czech Statistical Office reports that former NATO Military Committee chair Petr Pavel has been elected President of the Czech Republic, defeating former prime minister Andrej Babiš with 58 percent of the votes.

=== June ===
- 7 June – The 2023 UEFA Europa Conference League final, held in Prague's Fortuna Arena, sees English side West Ham United defeat Italian club Fiorentina.

=== December ===
- 21 December – 2023 Prague shooting: 14 people are killed and 25 others injured during a mass shooting at Charles University in Prague. The perpetrator, a student at the university, kills himself after the shooting.

== Deaths ==
=== January ===
- 2 January – Vasil Timkovič, 99, World War II veteran.
- 3 January – Petr Pavlásek, 75, Olympic weightlifter (1972, 1976).
- 4 January – Marie Kovářová, 95, gymnast, Olympic champion (1948).
- 14 January – Zdeněk Češka, 93, lawyer, academic and politician.
- 16 January – Pavel Pecháček, 82, Czech-born American journalist and manager.
- 17 January – Stanislav Tereba, 85, photojournalist.
- 19 January – Kristina Taberyová, 71, theatre and television director and humanitarian (People in Need).
- 20 January – Jiří Macháně, 82, cinematographer (Beauty and the Beast, The Ninth Heart, Černí baroni).
- 28 January –
  - Jaroslav Šedivý, 93, politician, minister of foreign affairs (1997–1998).
  - Jiří Šetlík, 93, art historian and academic.
- 31 January – Miroslav Lacký, 79, ice hockey player (HC Vítkovice Ridera, HC Dynamo Pardubice).

=== February ===
- 3 February – Naďa Urbánková, 83, singer and actress (Closely Watched Trains, Larks on a String, Seclusion Near a Forest).
- 6 February –
  - Květa Pacovská, 94, illustrator and writer.
  - Lubomír Štrougal, 98, politician, prime minister of Czechoslovakia (1970–1988).
- 7 February – František Cipro, 75, football player and manager.
- 16 February – Jana Andrsová, 83, ballerina and actress.
- 25 February – Martin Pěnička, 53, footballer.

=== March ===
- 6 March – Josef Vojta, 87, footballer.
- 12 March –
  - Karel Kaplan, 94, historian.
  - Marek Kopelent, 90, composer.
- 13 March – Ernst Tugendhat, 93, philosopher.
- 25 March – Emil Boček, 100, RAF pilot.

=== April ===
- 11 April – Dana Němcová, 89, psychologist and dissident.
- 12 April – Ivo Babuška, 97, Czech-born American mathematician.
- 21 April – Mahulena Čejková, 86, politician.

=== May ===
- 3 May – Josef Jařab, 85, academic and politician.
- 6 May – Petruška Šustrová, 75, dissident and journalist.
- 7 May – Jan Klein, 87, Czech-born American immunologist.
- 15 May – Jitka Svobodová, 81, painter and sculptor.
- 18 May – Joseph J. Kohn, 91, Czech-born American academic.
- 27 May – Jan Mrvík, 84, Olympic rower.

=== June ===
- 4 June – Zdeněk Pouzar, 91, mycologist.
- 6 June – Pavel Lebeda, 82, politician.
- 7 June – Miroslav Řepa, 93, architect.
- 23 June – Zdenka Nemeškalová-Jiroudková, 95, numismatist and archaeologist.

=== July ===
- 11 July – Milan Kundera, 94, Czech-born French writer (The Joke, The Unbearable Lightness of Being)
- 12 July – Miloslav Netušil, 77, Olympic gymnast.
- 21 July –
  - George Brooks, 97, Czech-born American jeweller.
  - Miroslav Toman Sr., 88, businessman and politician.
- 28 July – Jana Šulcová, 76, actress.
- 31 July – František Valošek, 86, footballer.

=== August ===
- 12 August – Petr Sommer, 73, historian and archaeologist.
- 25 August – Juliana Jirousová, 79, artist and painter.
- 27 August – Karel Holomek, 86, politician.

=== September ===
- 4 September – Filip Minařík, 48, jockey.
- 5 September – Otta Bednářová, 96, journalist.
- 15 September – Hana Doušová, 74, basketball player.
- 17 September – Petr Charvát, 74, historian.

=== October ===
- 2 October – Richard Salzmann, 94, politician.
- 6 October – Vilém Mandlík, 87, runner.
- 7 October – Oldřich Pelčák, 79, cosmonaut.
- 25 October – Zdeněk Mácal, 87, conductor.

=== November ===
- 3 November – Zdeněk Douša, 76, Olympic basketball player.
- 10 November – Pavel Kantorek, 93, long-distance runner.
- 12 November – Karel Schwarzenberg, 85, politician, diplomat and statesman.
- 14 November – Stanislav Žalud, 91, architect and politician.
- 17 November – Zdeněk Groessl, 82, Olympic volleyball player.
- 20 November – Zdena Hadrbolcová, 86, actress.
- 21 November – Hana Vlasáková, 75, Olympic volleyball player.
- 24 November – František X. Halas, 86, historian, academic and diplomat.
- 25 November – Ivan Havlíček, 78, physicist and politician.

=== December ===
- 4 December – Josef Vacenovský, 86, footballer.
- 21 December – Lenka Hlávková, 49, musicologist.
- 22 December – Eva Hauserová, 69, journalist.
