= Kotrba =

Kotrba (feminine: Kotrbová) is a Czech surname. The word kotrba is a Czech dialectical term for 'head' with a derogatory undertone and the surname probably originated as a nickname based on a prominent body part or mental characteristics. Notable people with the surname include:

- Emil Kotrba (1912–1983), Czech painter
- Jiří Kotrba (born 1958), Czech football manager and player
- Jorga Kotrbová (1947–2025), Czech actress
