= Těmice =

Těmice may refer to places in the Czech Republic:

- Těmice (Hodonín District), a municipality and village in the South Moravian Region
- Těmice (Pelhřimov District), a municipality and village in the Vysočina Region
