= Holomek =

Holomek is a surname. Notable people with the surname include:

- Karel Holomek (1937–2023), Czech engineer and politician
- Patrik Holomek (born 1974), Czech footballer
- Pavel Holomek (born 1972), Czech footballer
