= Přerov =

- Statutory city
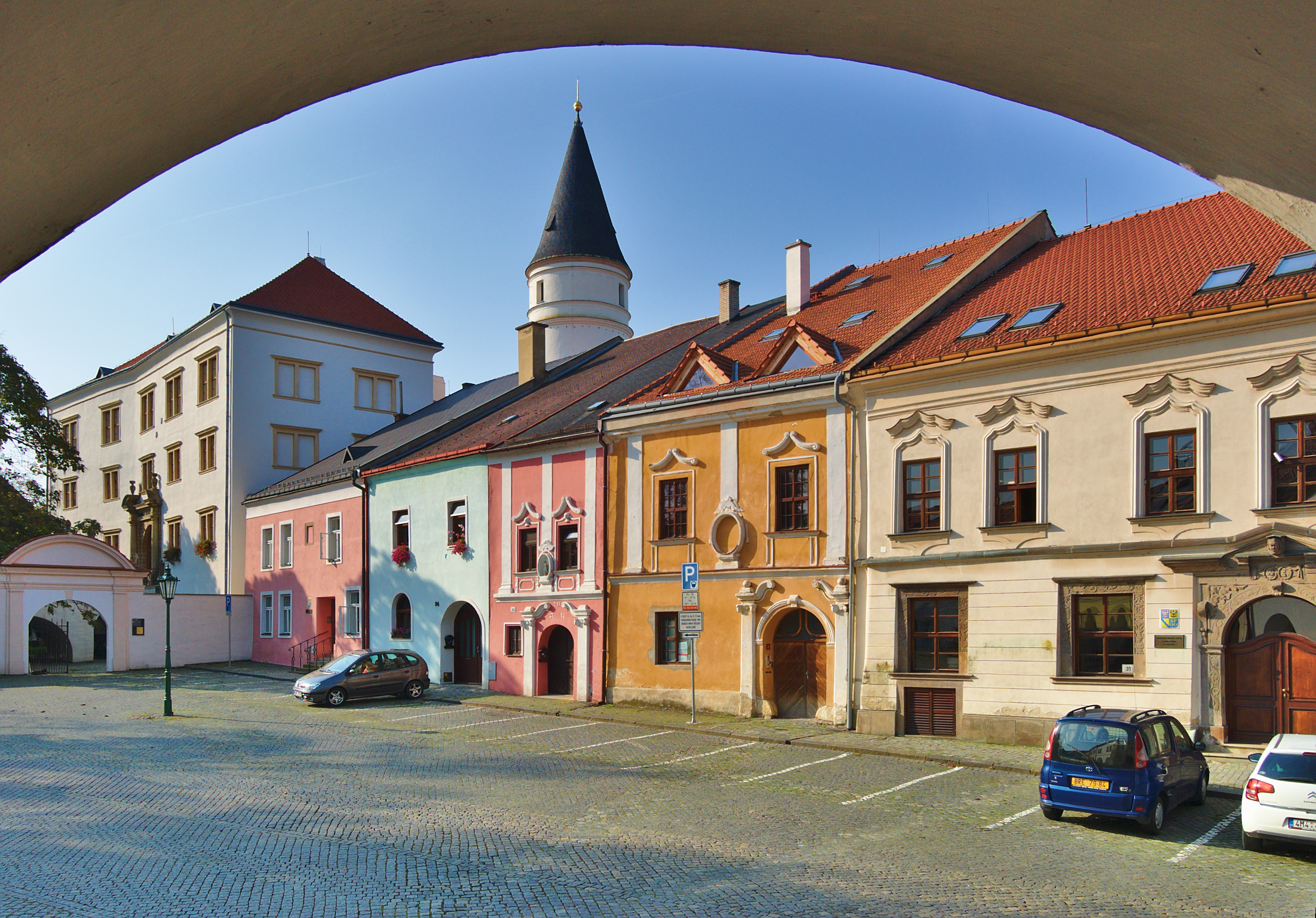
- The square Horní náměstí

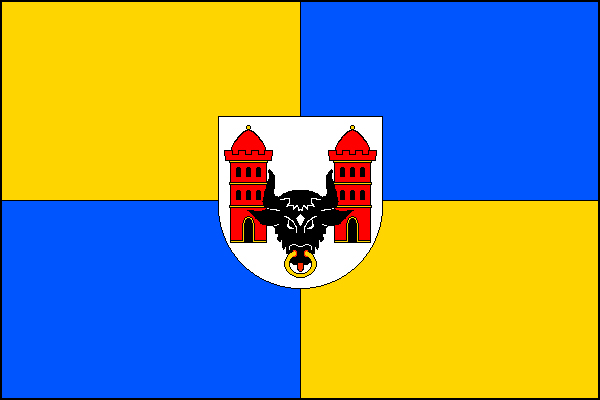
- Flag Coat of arms

- Location in the Czech Republic
- Coordinates: 49°27′20″N 17°27′4″E
- Country: Czech Republic
- Region: Olomouc
- District: Přerov
- First mentioned: 1141

Government
  - Mayor: Petr Vrána (ANO 2011)

Area
  - Total: 58.45 km^{2} (22.57 sq mi)
- Elevation: 210 m (690 ft)

Population (2026-01-01)
  - Total: 40,492
  - Density: 692.8/km^{2} (1,794/sq mi)
- Time zone: UTC+1 (CET)
  - Summer (DST): UTC+2 (CEST)
- Postal codes: 750 02, 751 24, 751 27
- Website: www.prerov.eu

Přerov (Czech pronunciation: [ˈpr̝̊ɛrof]; German: Prerau) is a city in the Olomouc Region of the Czech Republic. It has about 40,000 inhabitants. It is located in a lowland area, on the Bečva River.

Předmostí-Skalka within today's Přerov is one of two most important archaeological sites in the Czech Republic. In the past, Přerov was a major crossroad in the heart of the historical land of Moravia and today it is a railway junction. The historic city centre is well preserved and is protected as an urban monument zone.

== Administrative division ==
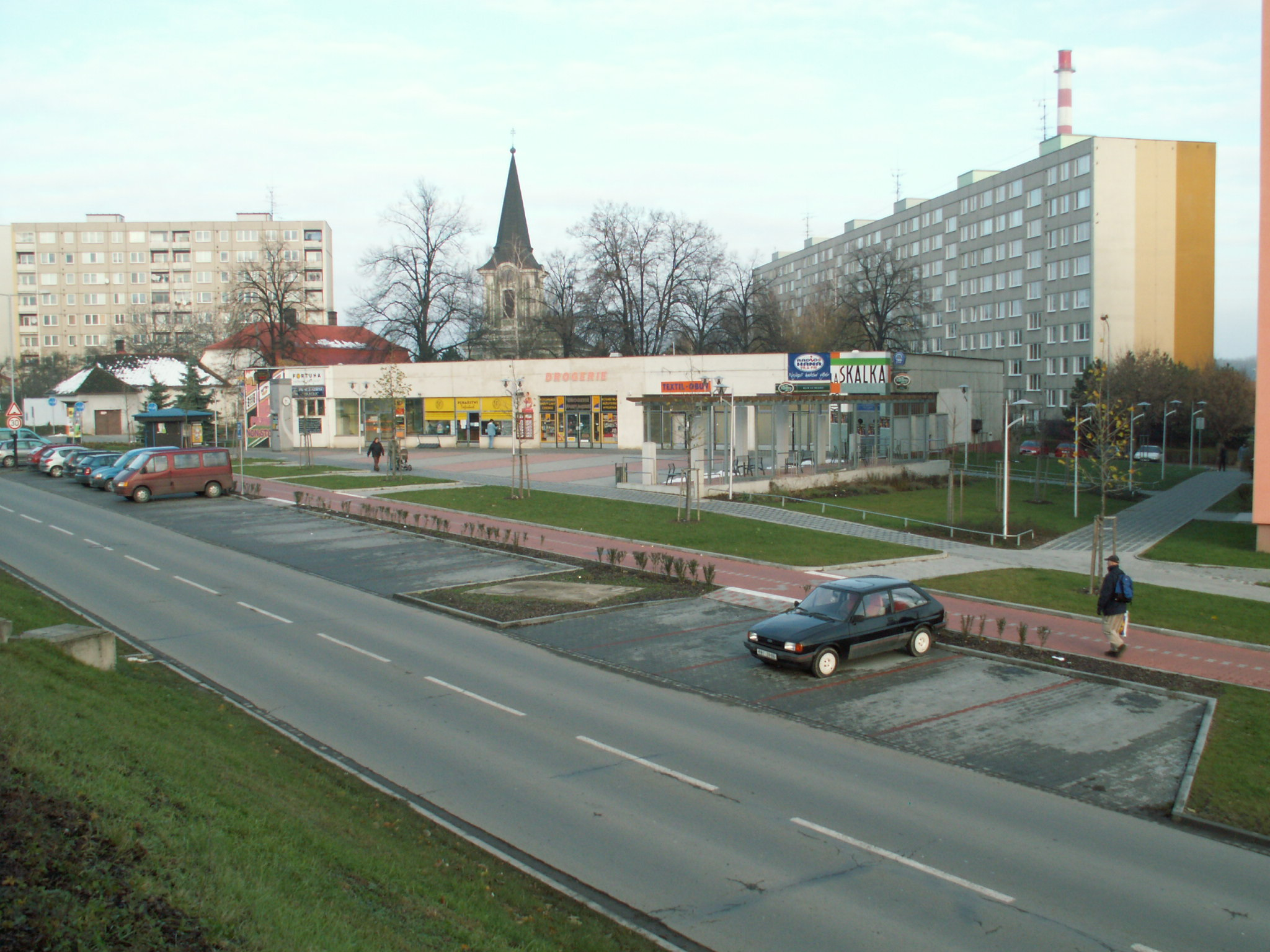
Předmostí

Přerov consists of 13 municipal parts (in brackets population according to the 2021 census):

- Přerov I-Město (31,582)
- Přerov II-Předmostí (3,992)
- Přerov III-Lověšice (481)
- Přerov IV-Kozlovice (589)
- Přerov V-Dluhonice (349)
- Přerov VI-Újezdec (868)
- Přerov VII-Čekyně (649)
- Přerov VIII-Henčlov (513)
- Přerov IX-Lýsky (187)
- Přerov X-Popovice (242)
- Přerov XI-Vinary (711)
- Přerov XII-Žeravice (562)
- Přerov XIII-Penčice (294)

== Etymology ==
The name Přerov is of Proto-Slavic origin. It meant 'ditch', 'pool', 'swamp', or 'stagnant water'.

== Geography ==
Přerov is located about 19 kilometres (12 mi) southeast of Olomouc, in the fertile Haná region. The eastern part of the municipal territory lies in the Moravian Gate lowlands and the western part lies in the Upper Morava Valley. A small northern part extends into the Nízký Jeseník range. The highest point is the hill Čekyňský kopec at 307 m (1,007 ft) above sea level. The Bečva River flows through the city.

== History ==
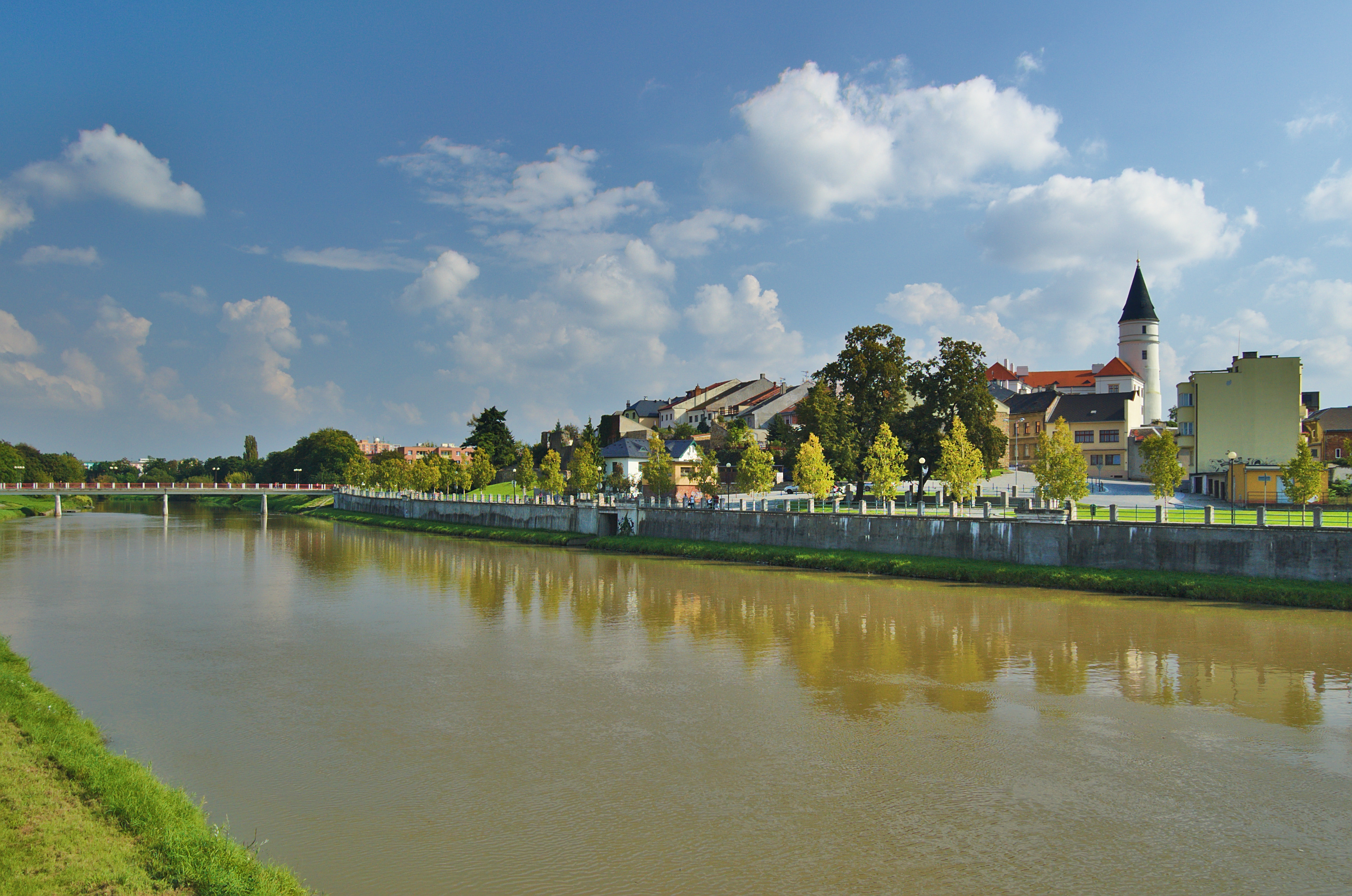
Bečva River and the historical centre

Settlement in the locality dates back to prehistoric times. A locality called Skalka in Předmostí city part is known worldwide for its rich archaeological discoveries, which mainly date back to the Paleolithic period. Discoveries include excavations of a large number of mammoth bones, sites of mammoth hunters' camps from 27–26 thousand years ago, and others. Together with Dolní Věstonice, it is the most important archaeological site in the country.

The first written mention of Přerov is in a deed of bishop Jindřich Zdík from 1141 and testifies to Přerov's administrative function in the castle system of the Přemyslid state. King Ottokar II of Bohemia gave Přerov the privilege of being a royal town in 1256.

An old stone fortress was built here in the first half of the 13th century. It was conquered and damaged during the Hussite Wars. In 1487, Přerov was acquired by the Pernštejn family. Vilém of Pernštejn had rebuilt the square Horní náměstí and the fortress, which became a solid Gothic castle. The hill around the castle was colonised by new settlers, including members of the Unity of the Brethren, thanks to which the town became a centre of culture and education in the 16th century.

In the second half of the 16th century, reconstruction of the castle into a Renaissance residence began. In the late 16th century, Přerov was bought by Karel the Elder of Zierotin, who chose the town as his seat. He had finished the reconstruction of the castle. During his rule, the town experienced prosperity. After the Battle of White Mountain, Zierotin was forced to moved away and the town lost its importance.

In 1841, the railway to Přerov was built and the town has become an important railway junction. In the second half of the 19th century, there has been rapid economic growth, driven primarily by the production of agricultural machinery.

German terror in Bohemia and Moravia peaked in spring 1945, sparking a Czech uprising, which started in Přerov on 1 May and then spread throughout the whole country after the murder of 78,154 Czech Jews and 340,000 Czech citizens during the German occupation. In June 1945, during the expulsion of Germans from Czechoslovakia, 265 Germans (71 men, 120 women and 74 children) were killed in Přerov.

On 1 July 2006, the town of Přerov became a statutory city.

== Demographics ==
Historical population

Year	Pop.	±%
1869	11,341	—
1880	15,464	+36.4%
1890	17,749	+14.8%
1900	22,007	+24.0%
1910	26,966	+22.5%

Year	Pop.	±%
1921	28,442	+5.5%
1930	30,270	+6.4%
1950	29,054	−4.0%
1961	36,101	+24.3%
1970	44,324	+22.8%

Year	Pop.	±%
1980	50,593	+14.1%
1991	51,300	+1.4%
2001	48,335	−5.8%
2011	44,361	−8.2%
2021	41,019	−7.5%

Source: Censuses

== Economy ==
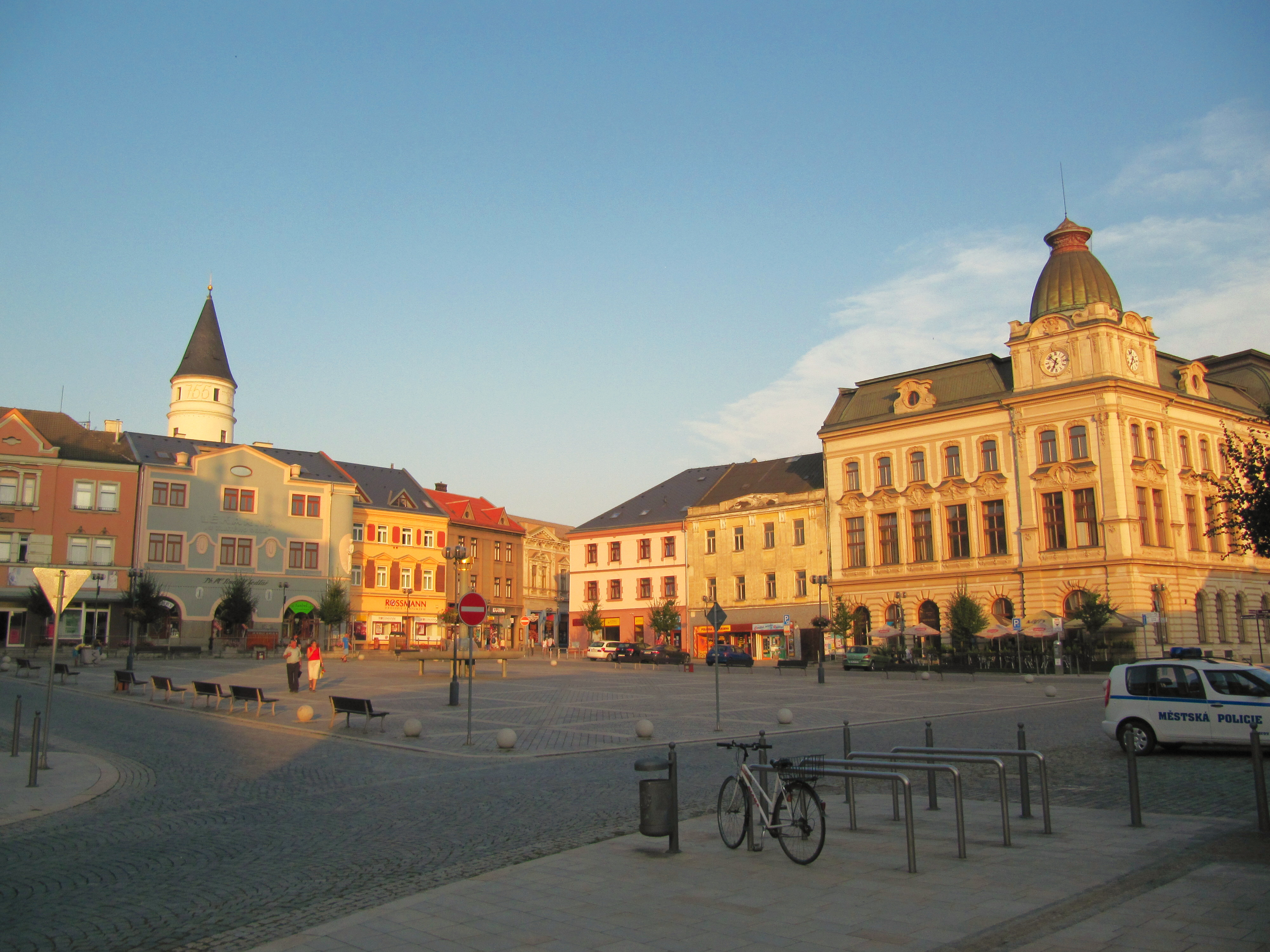
Náměstí T. G. Masaryka

The main employer based in the city is Meopta, a multinational company manufacturing various products mainly in the field of optics. It was founded in 1933.

Other major industrial companies include Precheza (representative of the chemical industry founded in 1894, owned by Agrofert) and DPOV (a subsidiary of České dráhy focused on repairs and modernisation of railway rolling stock).

Přerov is known for the Zubr Brewery. The brewery was founded in 1872.

== Transport ==
The D1 motorway goes around the city.

Přerov is a major railway junction and has direct connections with Prague, Brno and Ostrava in the Czech Republic, Warsaw and Kraków in Poland, Bratislava and Prešov in Slovakia, Vienna and Graz in Austria, and Budapest in Hungary.

A public domestic and private international airport is located in Přerov. It was established in 2013 by transformation from original military airport Přerov–Bochoř.

== Education ==
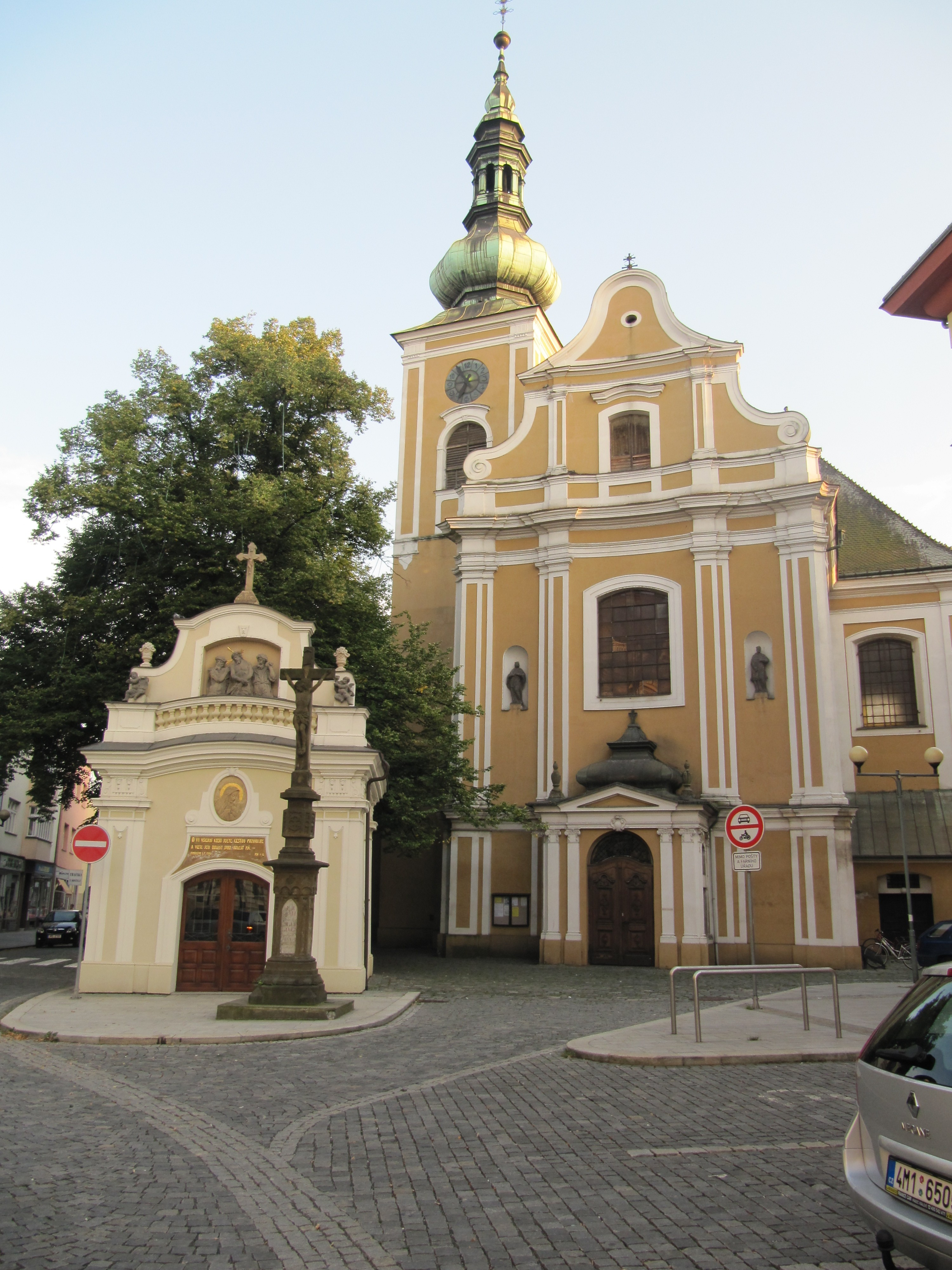
Church of Saint Lawrence

In Přerov is the College of Logistics, a private technical college of non-university type.

== Sport ==
Přerov is home to Volejbal Přerov, a professional women's volleyball club playing in Extraliga žen (top tier).

HC ZUBR Přerov is an ice hockey club that plays in the 1st Czech Republic Hockey League (2nd tier).

The city's association football club is 1. FC Viktorie Přerov. It plays in lower amateur tiers.

Tenis Přerov is a tennis club founded in 1899. Many notable players played for the club, e.g. Libor Pimek, Karel Nováček, Jaroslav Navrátil, Jana Novotná, Ctislav Doseděl, Jaroslav Pospíšil and Lukáš Rosol.

Auto Klub Přerov is dedicated to motor sports. There is an autocross track in the city, which regularly hosts the national autocross championship. The auto club also operates a motocross track that hosted several national championships between 1961 and 1974. There used to be also a motorcycle speedway track in the city and hosted a final round of the Czechoslovak Individual Speedway Championship in 1958, 1959 and 1967.

== Sights ==
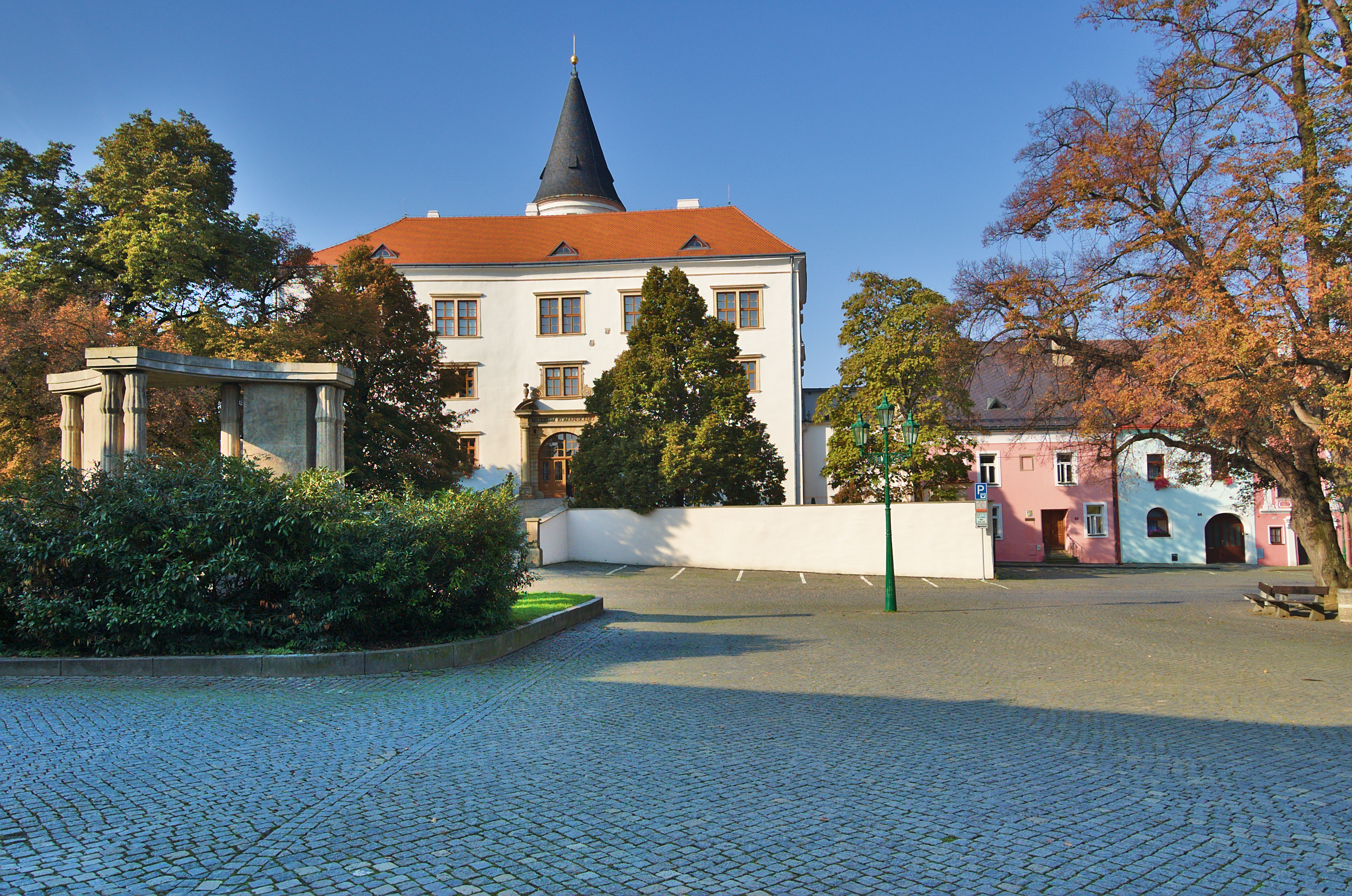
Přerov Castle

The historic town centre is formed by the square Horní náměstí and its immediate surroundings, delimited by the preserved town walls. Horní náměstí is lined by Renaissance burgher houses. The most valuable house is the so-called Corvinus House from 1570, with a preserved Renaissance portal.

The main landmark of the square is the Přerov Castle. The Renaissance castle has preserved Gothic core and stone elements from the original fortress. Today it houses the Comenius Museum, founded in 1887.

There are five church buildings in Přerov, the oldest of which is the Church of Saint Lawrence. This parish church was built in 1725–1732.

Mammoth Hunters Memorial in Předmostí is an exhibition pavilion, which presents this archaeological site and its discoveries.

== Notable people ==
- Jan Blahoslav (1523–1571), grammarian
- John Amos Comenius (1592–1670), philosopher and pedagogue; taught at Přerov Latin school in 1614–1618, having earlier studied there
- Franz Petrasch (1744–1820), Austrian general
- Rudolf Weigl (1883–1957), Polish biologist and inventor
- Liane Zimbler (1892–1987), architect
- Karel Janoušek (1893–1971), military leader
- Ida Ehre (1900–1989), actor and theatre director and manager
- Edouard Borovansky (1902–1959), ballet dancer
- Vilém Tauský (1910–2004), conductor and composer
- Eliška Kleinová (1912–1999), pianist and music educator
- Josef Kainar (1917–1971), poet
- Gideon Klein (1919–1945), composer and pianist
- Jiřina Hauková (1919–2005), poet and translator
- Milan Dobeš (1929–2025), graphical artist
- Karel Oujezdský (1946–2025), radio editor and journalist
- Vladimír Hučín (born 1952), political prisoner and secret service agent; lives here, honorary citizen of Přerov
- Karel Plíhal (born 1958), singer and musician
- Ctislav Doseděl (born 1970), tennis player
- Petr Ruman (born 1976), footballer
- Tomáš Cigánek (born 1978), footballer
- Jani Galik (born 1984), footballer
- Josef Hrabal (born 1985), ice hockey player
- Tomáš Kundrátek (born 1989), ice hockey player
- Kateřina Sokolová (born 1989), model and beauty pageant titleholder
- Jakub Markovič (born 2001), footballer

== Twin towns – sister cities ==
Přerov is twinned with:

- Bardejov, Slovakia
- Cuijk, Netherlands
- Děčín, Czech Republic
- Ivano-Frankivsk, Ukraine
- Kedzierzyn-Kozle, Poland
- Kotor, Montenegro
- Ozimek, Poland
