= Petr Štěpánek =

Czech actor (born 1948)

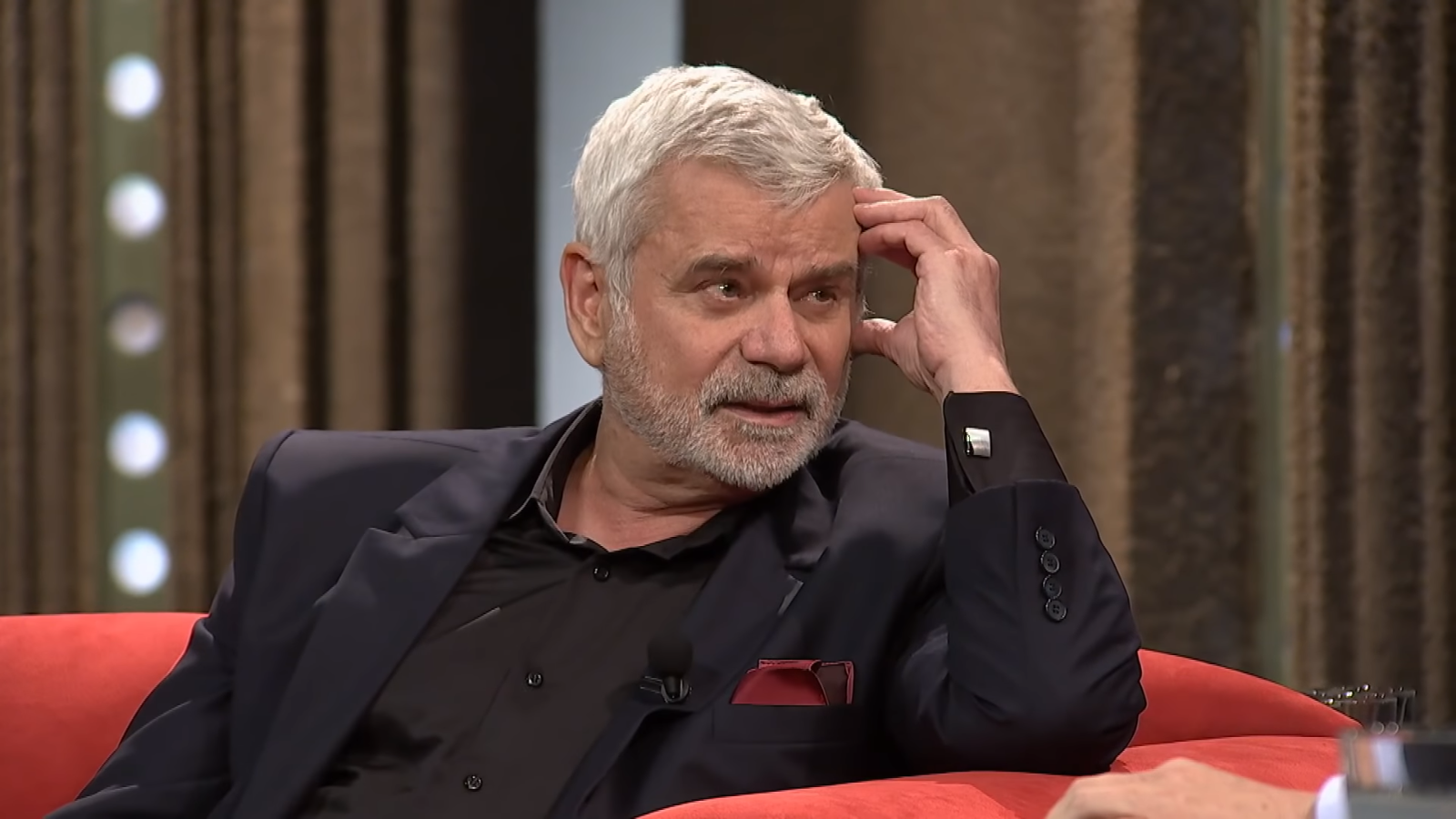
- Petr Štěpánek (2017)
- Born: 2 October 1948 (age 77); Prague, Czechoslovakia
- Education: Academy of Performing Arts in Prague
- Occupation: Actor
- Years active: 1961–present
- Spouse(s): Zlata Adamovská (m. 2013) Vlasta Janečková; Regina Rázlová
- Relatives: Zdeněk Štěpánek (father); Martin Štěpánek (brother); Jana Štěpánková (sister); Kristina Taberyová (sister)

Petr Štěpánek (born 2 October 1948) is a Czech actor.

== Selected filmography ==
=== Film ===
- Princ Bajaja (1971)
- Princess Goldilocks (1973)
- Blázni a děvčátka (1989)
- Zlatovláska (2025)

=== Television ===
- Ordinace v růžové zahradě 2 (2008)
- Cesty domů (2012)
- Ohnivý kuře (2016)
