= Princess Goldilocks =

- Written by: Vlasta Janečková
- Directed by: Vlasta Janečková
- Starring: Petr Štěpánek, Jorga Kotrbová
- Music by: Angelo Michajlov
- Country of origin: Czechoslovakia
- Original language: Czech

Production
- Cinematography: Josef Hanuš
- Running time: 74 minutes

Original release
- Release: 1973

Princess Goldilocks (Czech: Zlatovláska) is a 1973 Czechoslovak television musical fairytale film directed by Vlasta Janečková. It is based on a story by Karel Jaromír Erben. The film was shot at Červená Lhota Castle, Sychrov Castle and Slapy Dam.

== Plot ==
An old king buys a snake that enables communication with animals if eaten. His servant Jiřík has to prepare the meal for the king. The king bans Jiřík from tasting the meal, but Jiřík disobeys, and king punishes him. Jiřík has to leave his home and find a bride for his king - the beautiful Princess Goldilocks.

== Cast ==
- Petr Štěpánek as Jiřík
- Jorga Kotrbová as Goldilocks
- Ladislav Pešek as King
- Jiří Holý as Old King
- Marie Rosůlková as Babka
- Josef Bek as General
