= Karel Gult =

Czech actor (1947–2025)

- Born: 10 November 1947; Police nad Metují, Czechoslovakia
- Died: 26 August 2025 (aged 77); Czech Republic
- Occupation: Actor

Karel Gult (10 November 1947 – 26 August 2025) was a Czech actor.

== Life and career ==
Gult was born in Police nad Metují on 10 November 1947. He studied at the grammar school in Broumov and after graduation he studied singing at the State Conservatory in Prague, where he specialized in operetta and musicals.

As a film actor, he appeared in the Oscar-winning film Amadeus, where he played the role of a singer. He also starred in The Girl on the Broomstick, Saxana and the Lexicon of Spells, Byl jednou jeden polda, Discostory 2 and Kamarád do deště II – A Story from Brooklyn. His last film was Burning Bush.

In addition to film roles, he has also made a name for himself in television series, such as the Czechoslovak series Sanitka. He also worked as a dubbing actor, lending his voice to the Hamm in Toy Story, and Bubla in Finding Nemo and Finding Dory.

Until the beginning of the 1990s, he worked as a leading soloist of the Karlín Musical Theatre, where he was often cast in leading roles in more modern types of operettas and especially in musicals of all types. Later he performed in plays of the Josef Dvořák Theatre Company.

== Death ==
Gult died on 26 August 2025, at the age of 77.
