= Zlata Adamovská =

Czech actress

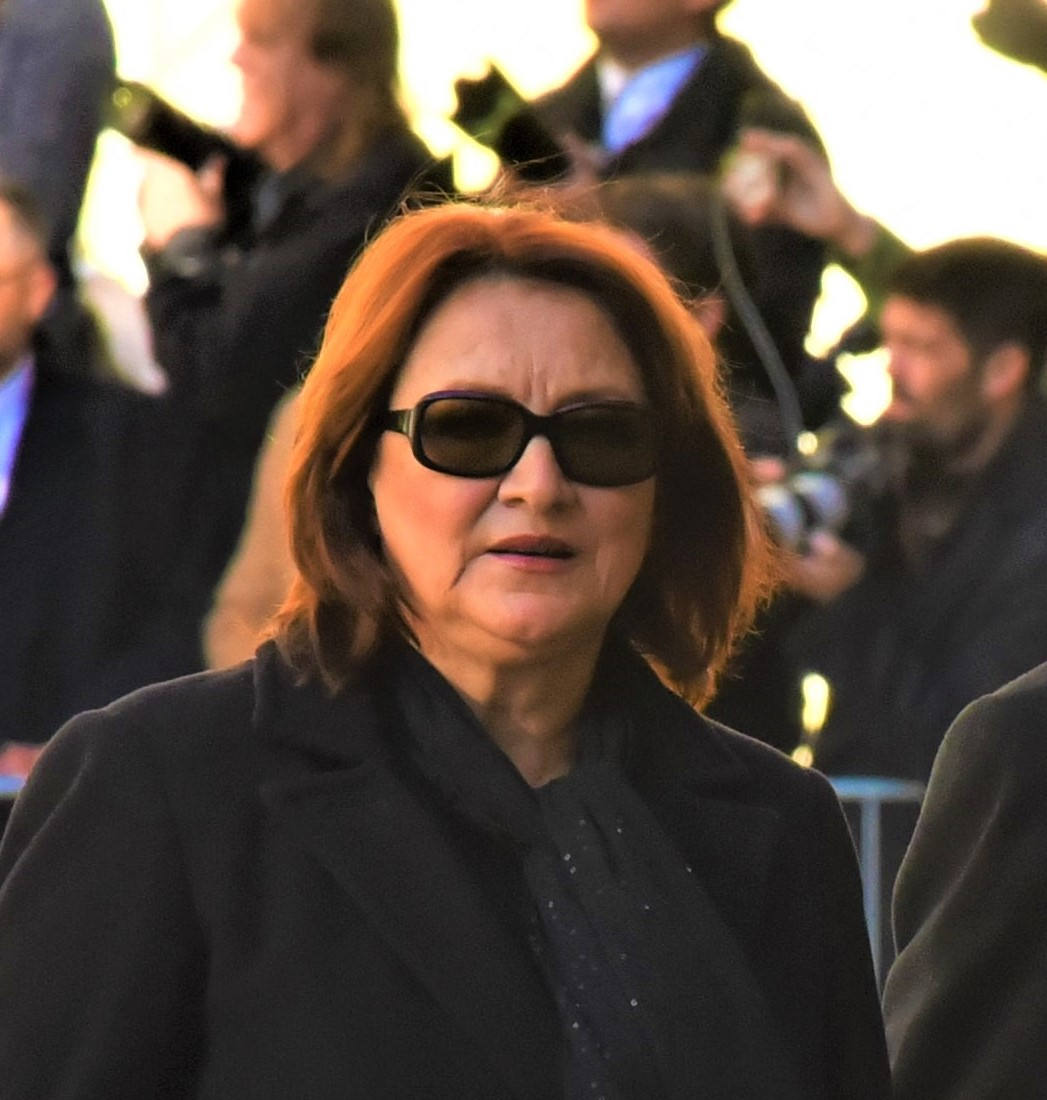
- Zlata Adamovská in 2019
- Born: 9 March 1959 (age 67); Prague, Czechoslovakia
- Occupation: Actress
- Years active: 1974–present
- Spouses: Vadim Petrov Jr. (m. 1979–1983) Radek John (m. 1984–2010) Petr Štěpánek (m. 2013)
- Children: Barbora, Petr

Zlata Adamovská (born March 9, 1959) is a Czech actress.

== Life and career ==
Born in Prague, she has starred in a number of films and TV series including Sanitka and Noc smaragdového měsíce, which was entered into the 35th Berlin International Film Festival. Since 1990, she has been a member of the ensemble at the Vinohrady Theatre. In December 2018 she agreed to play a role in an upcoming film Women on the Run. There, she plays the role of Vera, a woman with three sisters who are played by Tereza Kostková, Veronika Khek Kubařová and Jenovéfa Boková.

As of 2019, she plays at Theatre Studio DVA in several performances (Misery, Vzpomínky zůstanou,...).

== Selected filmography ==
- The Young Man and Moby Dick (1979)
- Love Between the Raindrops (1979)
- The Prince & The Evening Star (1979)
- O vánoční hvězdě (2020)
