= Police nad Metují =

- Town
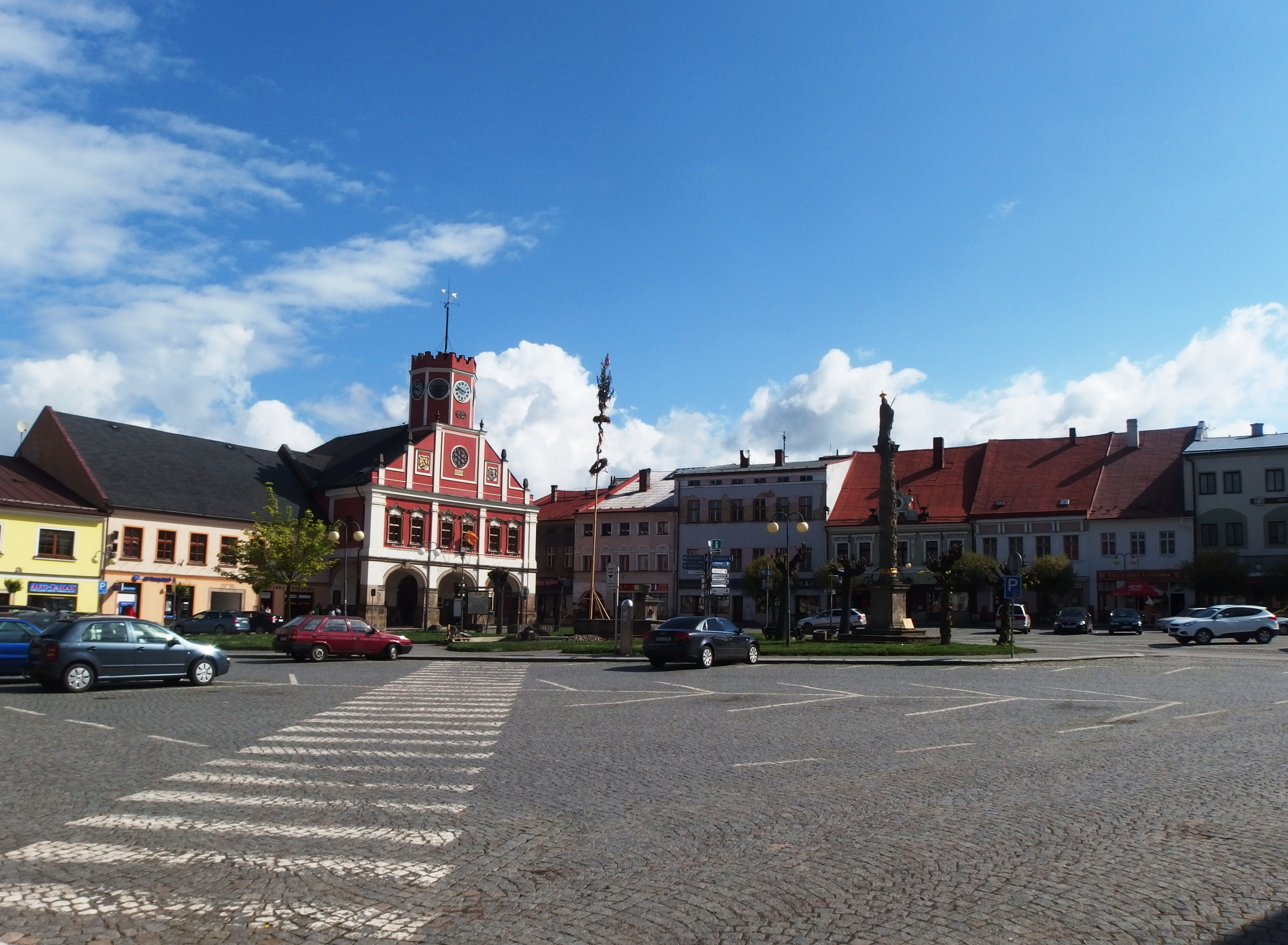
- Town square with the town hall

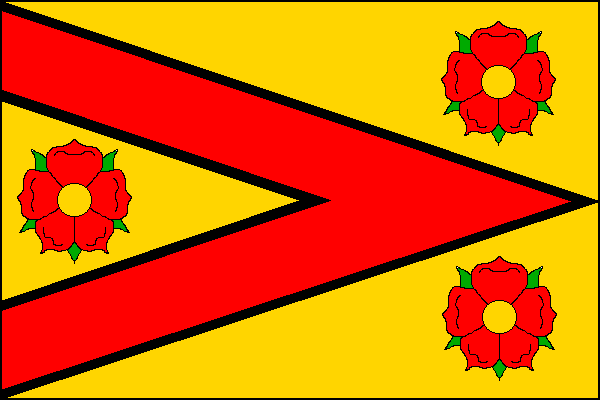
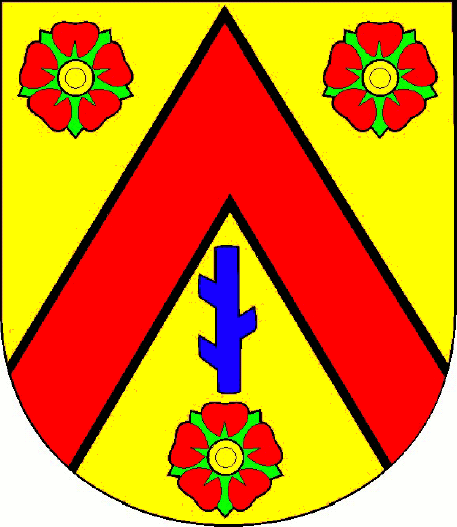
- Flag Coat of arms

- Location in the Czech Republic
- Coordinates: 50°32′13″N 16°14′0″E
- Country: Czech Republic
- Region: Hradec Králové
- District: Náchod
- First mentioned: 1253

Government
  - Mayor: Jiří Škop

Area
  - Total: 24.41 km^{2} (9.42 sq mi)
- Elevation: 441 m (1,447 ft)

Population (2026-01-01)
  - Total: 4,164
  - Density: 170.6/km^{2} (441.8/sq mi)
- Time zone: UTC+1 (CET)
  - Summer (DST): UTC+2 (CEST)
- Postal code: 549 54
- Website: www.policenm.cz

Police nad Metují (Czech pronunciation: [ˈpolɪtsɛ ˈnad mɛtujiː]; German: Politz an der Mettau) is a town in Náchod District in the Hradec Králové Region of the Czech Republic. It has about 4,200 inhabitants. The town is located in the Broumov Highlands.

Police nad Metují was probably founded in the first half of the 13th century. The historic town centre is well preserved and is protected as an urban monument zone. The most important monument is the Chapel of Our Lady of the Snow, protected as a national cultural monument.

== Administrative division ==
Police nad Metují consists of six municipal parts (in brackets population according to the 2021 census):

- Police nad Metují (1,172)
- Hlavňov (131)
- Hony (60)
- Pěko (224)
- Radešov (61)
- Velká Ledhuje (2,244)

== Etymology ==
The word police means 'shelf', 'board' in Czech. The name refers to the settlement's location in a flat place compared to the surrounding landscape.

== Geography ==
Police nad Metují is located about 14 kilometres (9 mi) northeast of Náchod and 25 km (16 mi) south of the Polish city of Wałbrzych. It lies in the Broumov Highlands, in the Broumovsko Protected Landscape Area. The highest point is the Na Kostele hill at 690 m (2,264 ft) above sea level. Despite the town's name, the nearby Metuje River flows outside the municipal territory.

== History ==
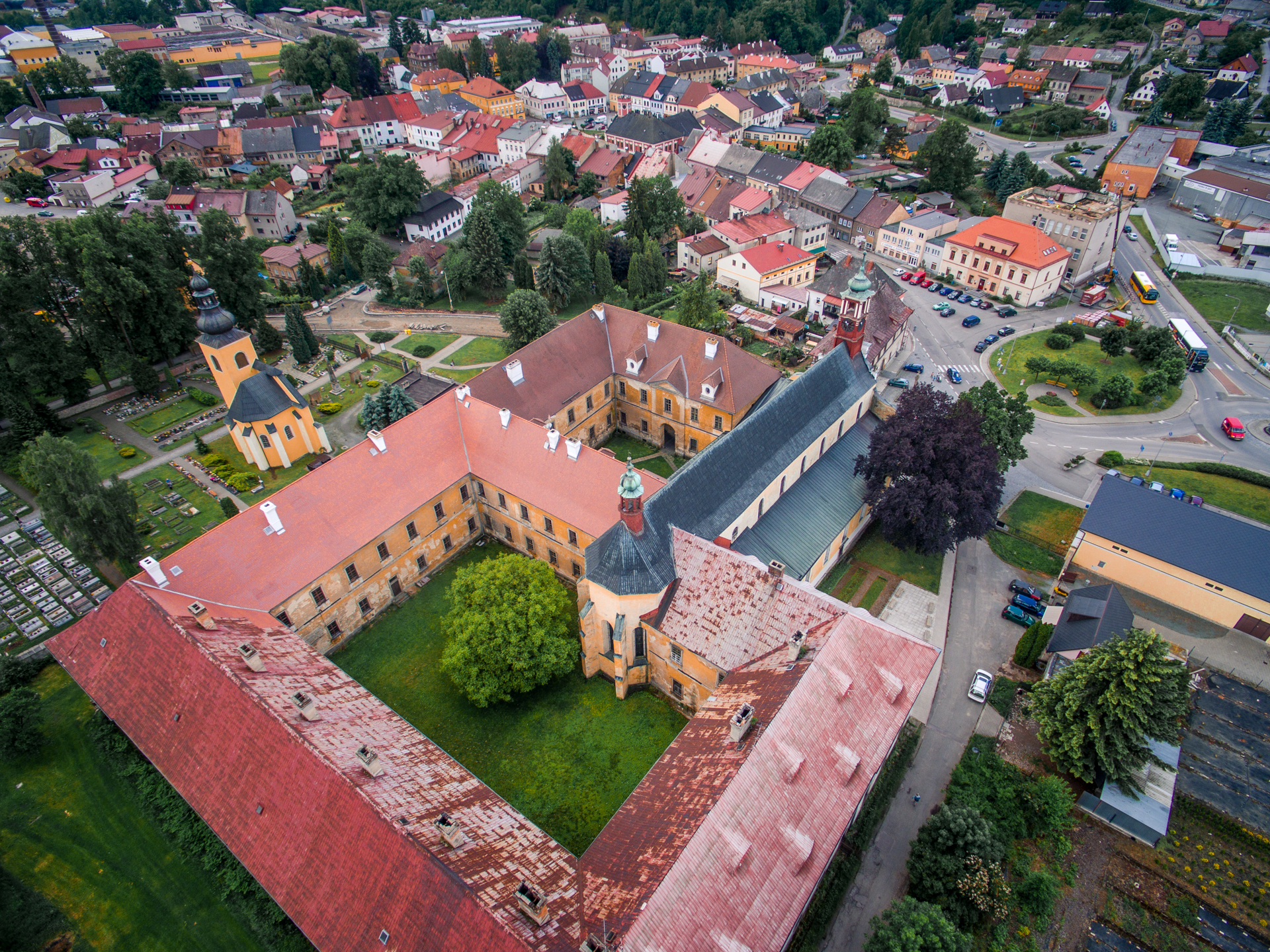
Aerial view of the monastery complex

Several hermits settled in the local forest at the beginning of the 13th century. The first written mentions of Police are in a charter dated 1213, by which King Ottokar I donated the area to the Břevnov Monastery in Prague, and in a document dated 1229, by which King Wenceslaus I confirmed the donation. Although these two documents are forgeries, they are not much newer than the data mentioned in them. The first trustworthy written mention of Police is from 6 September 1253, when King Ottokar II endowed it with the right to hold markets.

In 1254–1294, the Church of the Assumption of the Virgin Mary was built. The construction of the monastery began immediately afterwards and was finished in 1306. In 1395, Police was first referred to as a market town.

At the onset of the Hussite Wars, Police was sacked and burnt by the Catholic Silesians on 27 May 1421. In 1469, the army under command of Matthias Corvinus looted the market town and burned it down, including the monastery. During the early 16th century, Police recovered and prospered. However, the market town was almost completely destroyed by the great fire of 1535. It recovered again and in 1601, it was first referred to as a town.

During the Thirty Years' War, the town suffered and after the war significantly depopulated. It was also severely damages by fires in 1673 and 1700. During the first half of the 18th century, it recovered and new buildings were built. The monastery and the church were renovated in the Baroque style. The monastery was abolished by edict of Emperor Joseph II in 1786.

Police was growing in importance as a hub of business and culture in the first half of the 19th century. The promising development was slowed after the opening of the railway from Choceň to Meziměstí, which bypassed the town.

== Demographics ==
Historical population

Year	Pop.	±%
1869	4,818	—
1880	4,702	−2.4%
1890	4,822	+2.6%
1900	5,024	+4.2%
1910	5,557	+10.6%

Year	Pop.	±%
1921	4,746	−14.6%
1930	4,738	−0.2%
1950	4,169	−12.0%
1961	4,312	+3.4%
1970	4,160	−3.5%

Year	Pop.	±%
1980	4,676	+12.4%
1991	4,480	−4.2%
2001	4,396	−1.9%
2011	4,183	−4.8%
2021	3,892	−7.0%

Source: Censuses

== Transport ==
Police nad Metují is located on the railway line Broumov–Starkoč.

== Sights ==
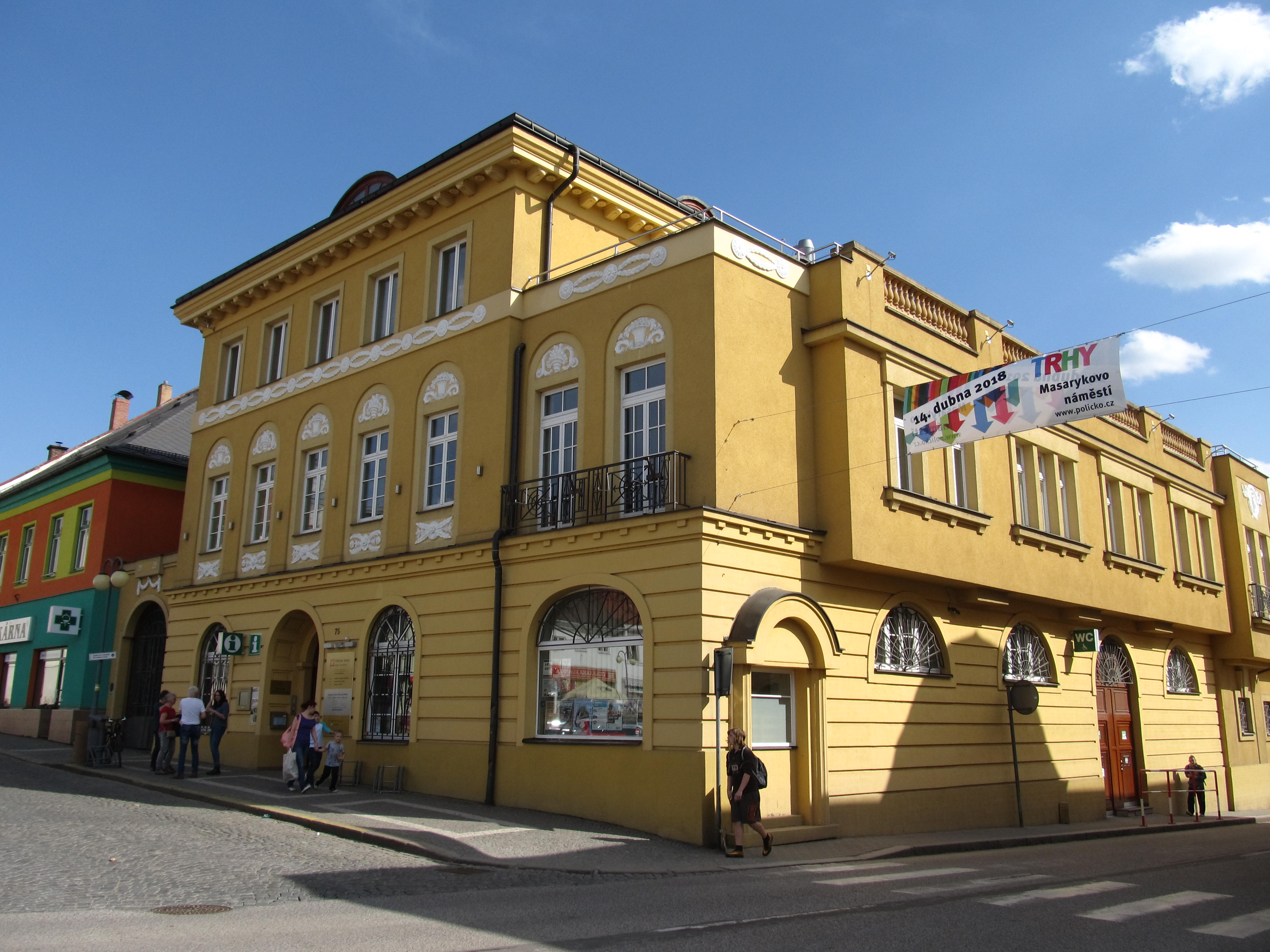
Pelly's houses

The most important monument is the Chapel of Our Lady of the Snows, located on the Hvězda hill. It was built in the Baroque style in 1733 according to the design by architect Kilian Ignaz Dientzenhofer. Its floor plan has the shape of a five-pointed star. For its value, it has been protected as a national cultural monument since 2022.

The monastery is formed by originally early Gothic buildings from 1306 that were rebuilt in the Baroque style in 1676–1772. Its premises now house the town museum. In the monastery complex is the Church of the Assumption of the Virgin Mary, partly rebuilt in the Baroque style in 1716–1723. The church has an early Gothic angled portal with deep lining and rich plant décor with Romanesque elements from around 1270, which is a rare sculptural monument.

The historic town centre is made up of the square Masarykovo náměstí and adjacent streets. The main landmark of the square is the town hall from 1718. The original tower burned down in 1842 and was replaced by new tower in the Tudor Revival style. The Pelly's houses on the square are three architecturally valuable houses, combined into one whole in 1931. Today they serve cultural and educational purposes.

== Notable people ==
- Hanuš Wihan (1855–1920), cellist
- Karel Gult (1947–2025), actor
- Miroslav Šmíd (1952–1993), rock climber and mountaineer

== Twin towns – sister cities ==
Police nad Metují is twinned with:

- Colli al Metauro, Italy
- Świdnica, Poland
- Travnik, Bosnia and Herzegovina
