= Tomáš Cigánek =

Czech footballer

Personal information
- Date of birth: 30 November 1978 (age 47)
- Place of birth: Přerov, Czechoslovakia
- Height: 1.77 m (5 ft 10 in)
- Position: Midfielder

Team information
- Current team: Kladno
- Number: 10

Senior career*
Years	Team	Apps	(Gls)
2000–2002	Prostějov		
2002–2005	Mladá Boleslav	22	(1)
2005–2010	Kladno	94	(3)
- * Club domestic league appearances and goals as of 1 August 2010

Tomáš Cigánek (born 30 November 1978, in Přerov) is a Czech footballer (midfielder) who plays for SK Kladno.
