= Jana Štroblová =

Czech writer and translator (1936–2025)

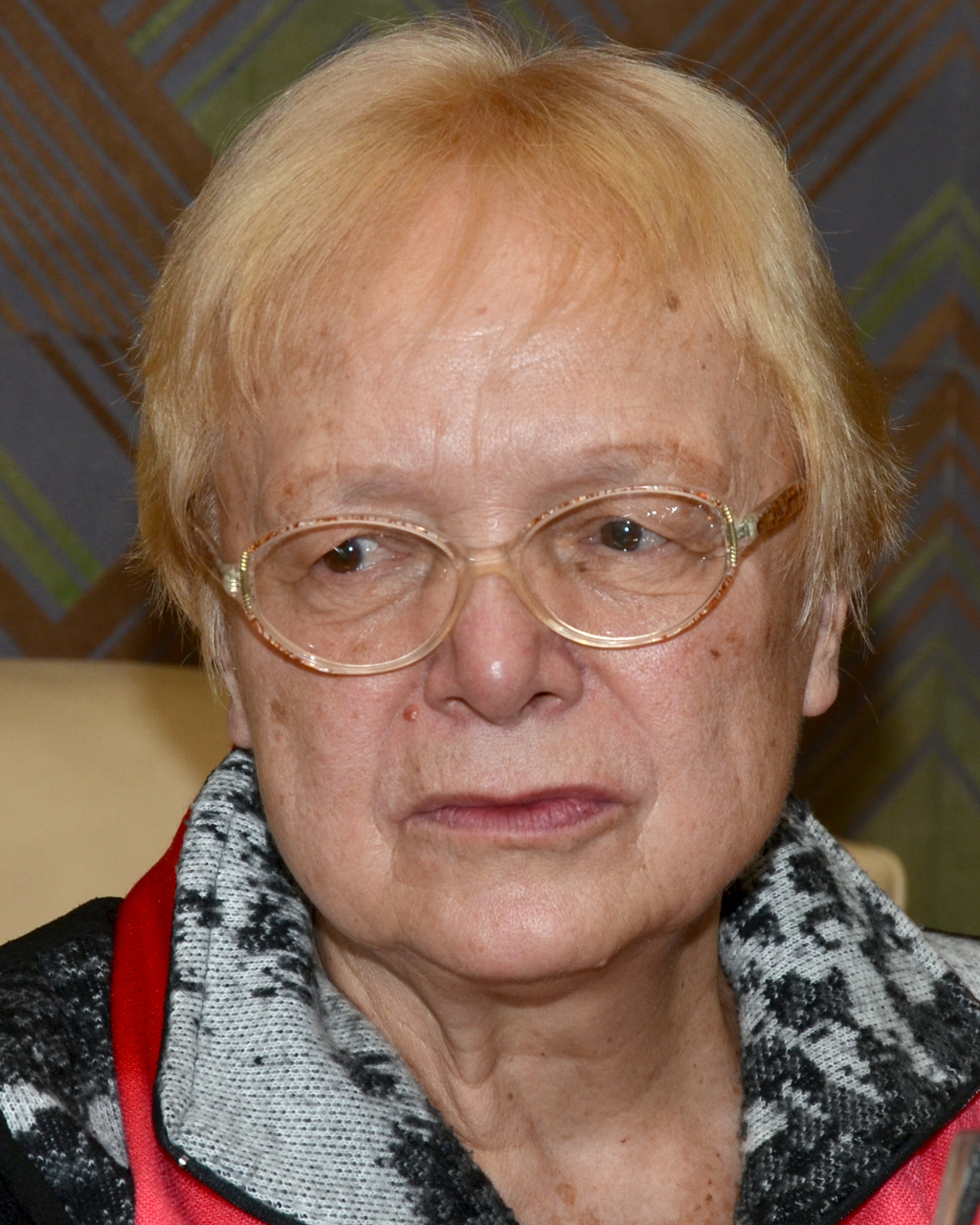
Štroblová in 2015

Jana Štroblová (1 July 1936 – 9 November 2025) was a Czech writer, poet and translator.

== Life and career ==
Štroblová was born in Prague on 1 July 1936.

During the course of her literary career, she authored twenty collections of poetry. She was the author of several prose books and a number of children's books. She also translated the works of exiled Russian poet Marina Tsvetaeva. In collaboration with the sinologist Josef Kolmaš, she rewrote poetry from ancient China and Tibet, and with the Arabist Karel Petráček, old Arabic poetry.

A number of her poems have been set to music and have become part of the repertoire of well-known performers, such as Hana Hegerová.

Štroblová died on 9 November 2025, at the age of 89.

== Awards ==
- 2011 – Ján Smrek Award (for lifetime achievement)
- 2016 – František Hrubín Award
