= Miroslav Šmíd =

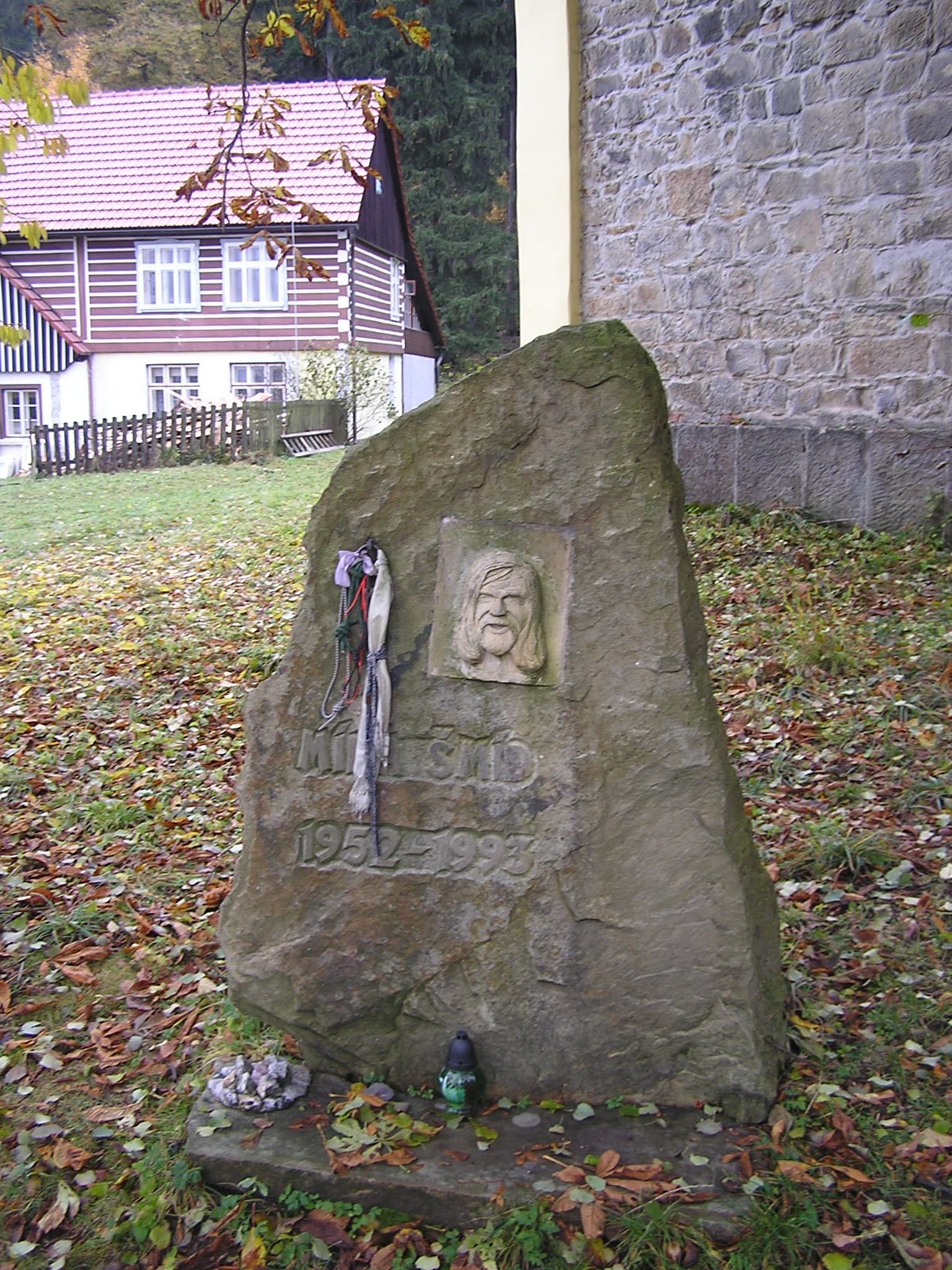
Memorial to Miroslav "Míra" Šmíd

Miroslav Šmíd (1952, Police nad Metují, Czechoslovakia – 11 September 1993, Lost Arrow, Yosemite National Park, USA) was a Czech rock climber, solo climber, mountaineer, mountain cinematographer and photographer. He also organized climbing and cultural events. In 1981 he founded The International Festival of Mountaineering Films (Czech: Mezinárodní horolezecký filmový festival) in Teplice nad Metují. He also wrote several books.

== Life and climbing career ==
Šmíd started climbing in the Ostaš climbing area and continued in Adršpach-Teplice Rocks, where he climbed a number of famous first ascents. In the High Tatras, Slovakia, he completed 230 ascents (80 of which were in winter and 25 first ascents, including a solo ascent of the Poslední dostih route on Veľká Javorová veža in 1976). In Scotland he completed the first winter ascent of the Glover's Chimney route on Ben Nevis in 1981. He also completed several solo climbs in Caucasus. He tried to make his solo climbs a secret as they were not approved of by the Socialist Party officials who lead the country at that time. When the solo ascents were revealed, it was very difficult to settle the disagreement. Still, Šmíd received an honor for his sport activities despite the solo climbing controversy.

Miroslav Šmíd climbed in various mountain areas and made a number of important ascents: the Alps (first ascent in the north face of Eiger in winter in 1978), the Dolomites (north face of Cima Grande in 1975), Norway (Trollryggen in winter 1976), Caucasus (solo winter ascent of Donguz Orun 1983), Pamir Mountains (solo ascent of Peak Korzhenevskaya in 1977 and first ascent in 1979), Fann Mountains, Andes (first ascent of Yerupajá Sur, solo climb, 1980) Yosemite (solo ascent of Dihedral Wall on El Capitan 1978), Patagonia (Fitz Roy and Cerro Torre, 1990) and Alaska (Mount McKinley 1989, 1991 and 1993) He ascended Mount Kenya in Africa in 1986. He also participated in expeditions to the Himalayas (Lhotse Shar, Dhaulagiri 1984, Mount Everest 1987) He also undertook demanding solo ascents (e.g. Ama Dablam in 1986).

Šmíd was allured by everything adventurous, and he also became a pioneer of mountain paragliding in Czechoslovakia. His well-known descent from Bzeduch Mountain in the Caucasus mountain range resulted in a broken pelvis after landing on a moraine.

Šmíd died on 11 September 1993 while solo climbing on the Lost Arrow in Yosemite National Park. Apparently he fell just below the top while climbing unbelayed. All his equipment was found on the last ledge below the top. The body was found at the bottom of the gorge between the massifs and the spire by one of his friends. On the basis of a denture, the body was identified as Šmíd’s.
