= DJ Tráva =

Czech DJ (1965–2025)

Petr Votava (27 January 1965 – 5 October 2025), better known as DJ Tráva, was a Czech DJ and electronic music producer.

== Life and career ==
Votava was considered one of the pioneers of electronic dance music in post-revolutionary Czechoslovakia and later in the Czech Republic. As a DJ, he focused mainly on house and techno styles.

Following the Velvet Revolution, he fell in love with electronic music, which he soon began to play in Prague clubs. In 1995, he became a resident DJ at the Bunkr club. From 1996 onwards, his home stage became the Roxy club.

From 1997, he was involved in the music group Significant Other, with which he released the studio album MONGO. HUNTING. In 2015, together with Risto Sokolovský, he founded the Lazy Lizard project.

DJ Tráva died on 5 October 2025, at the age of 60.
