= Jitka Svobodová =

Czech painter and sculptor (1941–2023)

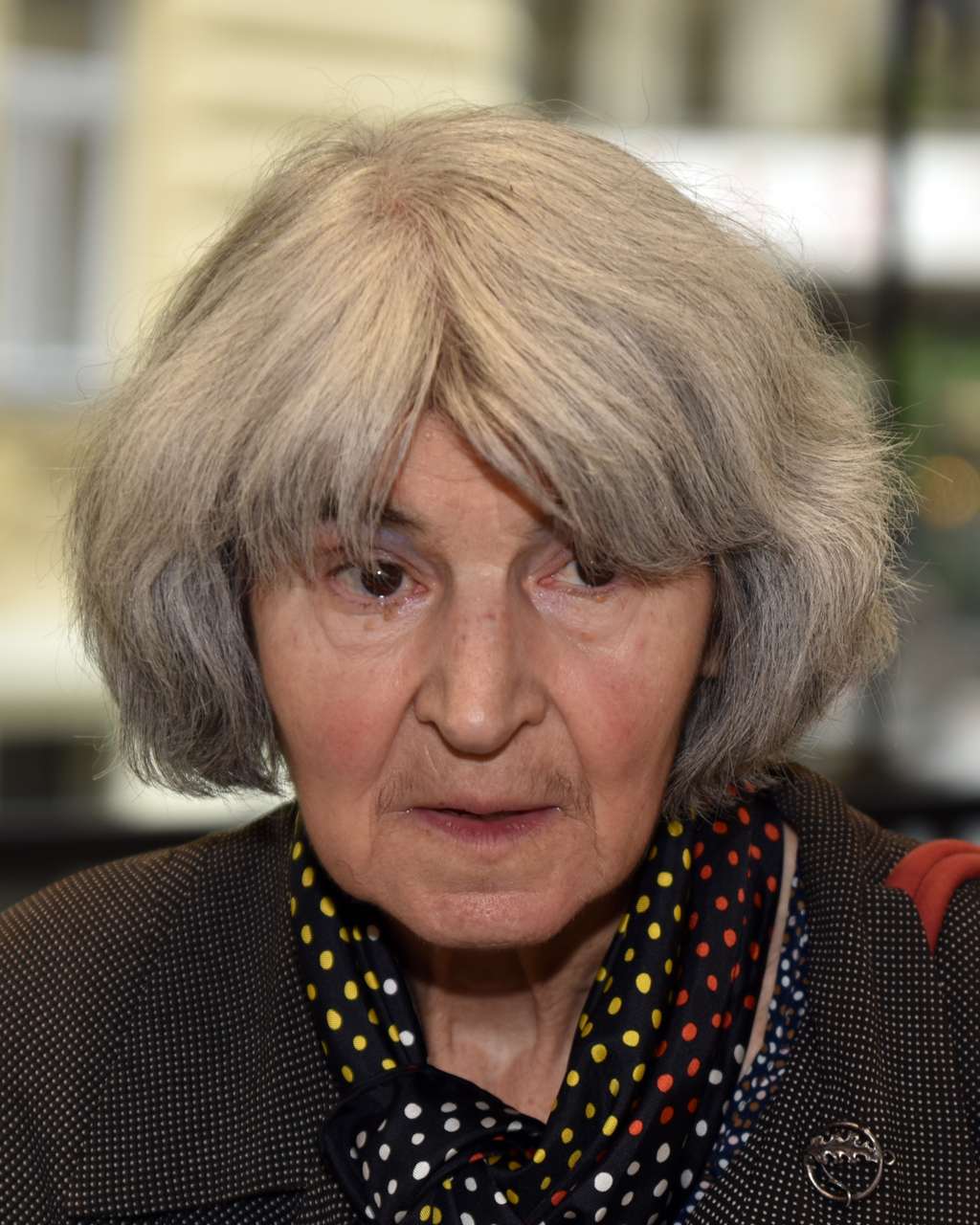
- Born: 9 September 1941; Prague, Protectorate of Bohemia and Moravia
- Died: 15 May 2023 (aged 81); Prague, Czech Republic
- Known for: Painting; Sculpture

Jitka Svobodová (9 September 1941 – 15 May 2023) was a Czech sculptor, painter and academic.

== Biography ==
Svobodová was the daughter of lawyer Jiří Svoboda. She studied at the Secondary Industrial School of Interior Design and at the Academy of Fine Arts in Prague. She trained in monumental and restoration painting from 1973 to 1976.

Svobodová was an expert in drawings, wire, superficial realizations and three-dimensional objects. She was considered one of the most important artists of modern and contemporary art. She exhibited in her country, abroad and participated in many collective exhibitions, her works are represented in important public and private collections.

Svobodová died in Prague on 15 May 2023, at the age of 81.
