= František Makeš =

Swedish artist, scientist and chemist (1931–2025)

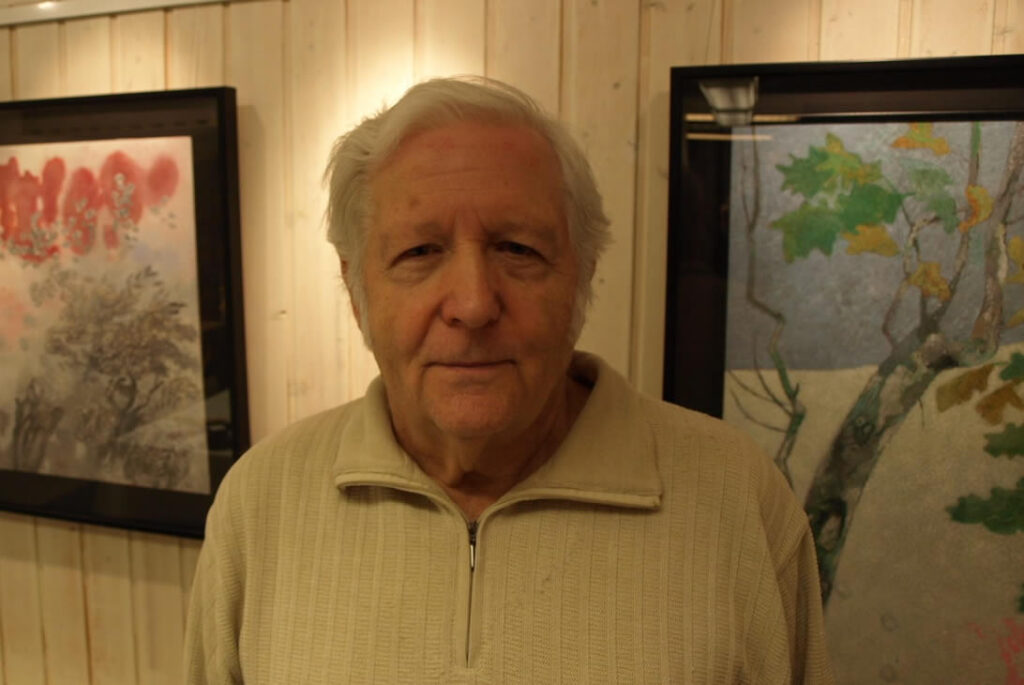
František Makeš 2022

František Makeš (9 December 1931 – 16 January 2025) was a Swedish artist, scientist and chemist, specialising in the conservation of art objects.

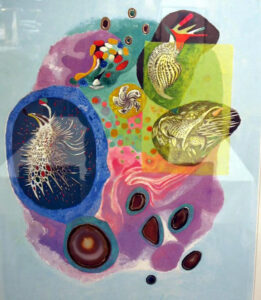
Fractals I

== Life and career ==
Makeš was born on 9 December 1931. He studied at the Academy of Fine Arts in Prague. In the mid-1960s, he participated in the preservation work of the Royal collection in Prague and reached great international fame for his conservation work. After the occupation in 1968 he moved to Sweden and continued his research, where he was awarded a Ph.D. degree by the University of Gothenburg.

He worked, among other things, as chief curator of the Skokloster castle and its art collections.

In 2005 Makeš was awarded the "Gratias Agit Award" by the Czech Ministry of Culture.

In 2006 Makeš was awarded H. M. The King's Medal 8th size in silver with a blue ribbon for significant and sustained action on the preservation of art and painting, mainly in connection with the art collections at Skokloster.

Internationally, he is recognized for his scientific approach regarding the disclosure of imitation paintings and for his two patents in biochemistry. Makeš continued his research with polarographic analysis and is thus in the footsteps of Jaroslav Heyrovský who received the Nobel Prize in Chemistry in 1957. Makeš's latest research focuses on how he – whoever wants to – can best preserve their cultural heritage.

Towards his later years, František dedicated more and more time towards his art. Many of his artworks are based on what he saw under the microscope.

Makeš died 16 January 2025, at the age of 93.

== Scientific works ==
- Enzymatic consolidation of paintings OCLC 22464068
- Remarks on relining OCLC 7520158
- Enzymatic consolidation of the portrait of Rudolf II as "Vertumnus by Giuseppe Arcimboldo with a new multi-enzyme preparation isolated from antarctic krill (Euphausia superba) OCLC 883046812
- Enzymatic examination of the authenticity of a painting attributed to Rembrandt : krill enzymes as diagnostic tool for identification of "The repentant Magdalene" OCLC 30259359
- Investigation, restoration and conservation of Matthaeus Merian portraits OCLC 35867059
- Damage to old bookbindings in the Skoloster library : a new method of inhibiting injurious enzymes in leather OCLC 67340390
- Enzymatic restoration and authentication of Giuseppe Arcimboldo's "Vertumnus" OCLC 769227618
- Mold damage to cultural memorials : a new method of removing molds and material attacked by molds from pictures using krill enzymes OCLC 57384389
- Analysis and conservation of the picture "Rudolph II" by G. Arcimboldi
- Enzymatic consolidation of a painting : seventeenth century landscape from Skokloster Palace OCLC 938362972
- Damage to old bookbindings in the Skokholster Library : a new method of inhibiting injurious enzymes in leather. OCLC 857325291
- Enzimatic consolidation of a painting: seventeenth century landscape from Skokloster Palace OCLC 611038491
- Enzymatic Hydrolysis of the lining paste in eeckhout picture 'Joseph and His Brothers' by krill enzymes OCLC 908519643
- Enzymatic consolidation of paintings OCLC 908497837
- Enzymatic removal of lining paste from the pictures OCLC 908497398
- Enzymatic consolidation of a painting: seventeenth century landscape from skokloster palace OCLC 5525868765
- Novel enzymatic technologies to safeguard cultural heritage OCLC 162276129
- Novel enzymatic technologies to ascertain authenticity of a 14th century Madonna OCLC 920663177
