= Josef Kolmaš =

Czech translator (1933–2021)

- Born: 6 August 1933; Těmice, Czechoslovakia
- Died: 9 February 2021 (aged 87); Czech Republic
- Occupations: Sinologist, tibetologist, translator

Academic background
- Education: Charles University; Minzu University of China
- Influences: Jaroslav Průšek; Yu Daoquan

Academic work
- Discipline: Sinology; Tibetology

Josef Kolmaš (6 August 1933 in Těmice – 9 February 2021) was a leading Czech sinologist and tibetologist.

== Career ==
He was a translator and world-renowned expert on the history of Sino-Tibetan relations, a long-time researcher at the Oriental Institute of the Czechoslovak Academy of Sciences and the Academy of Sciences of the Czech Republic, and its director from 1994 to 2002.

== Works ==
- Tibet and Imperial China: A Survey of Sino-Tibetan Relations Up to the End of the Manchu Dynasty in 1912 1967
- A Genealogy of the Kings of Derge (sde dge'i rgyal rabs) 1968
- Iconography of the Derge Kanjur and Tanjur 1978 ISBN 9788179360019
- The Ambans and Assistant Ambans of Tibet (A Chronological Study), 1994
- Buddhistická svatá písma 1995 ISBN 80-85809-23-0
- Vzpomínka na Tibet 1997 ISBN 80-85809-73-7
- Suma tibetského písemnictví 2004 ISBN 80-7203-592-4
- Tibet: Dějiny a duchovní kultura 2004 ISBN 80-7203-627-0
- Klasické tibetské příběhy: Mysterium o životě a zmrtvýchvstání krásné paní Nangsy. O ptácích a opicích. Zrcadlo králů 2009 ISBN 978-80-88969-42-6
- Malá encyklopedie tibetského náboženství a mytologie 2009 ISBN 978-80-7277-394-7
- Slovník tibetské literatury 2010 ISBN 978-80-7277-453-1
- Tibet 2011 ISBN 978-80-7277-483-8
- Země na střeše světa: Z dějin poznávání Tibetu 2011 ISBN 978-80-88969-56-3
- Pojednání o věcech tibetských 2014 ISBN 978-80-7429-386-3
- Pojednání o věcech čínských 2015 ISBN 978-80-7429-629-1
