= Sanitka =

Czechoslovak medical drama television series

Sanitka (Czech for Ambulance) is a Czech medical drama series, first broadcast in 1984. Eleven episodes were made. It stars Jaromír Hanzlík, Tomáš Juřička and Zlata Adamovská among others.

== Storyline ==
The story follows a doctor who chooses to become a paramedic instead of advancing his current career in medicine from 1956 to 1975.
