= Těmice (Hodonín District) =

- Municipality
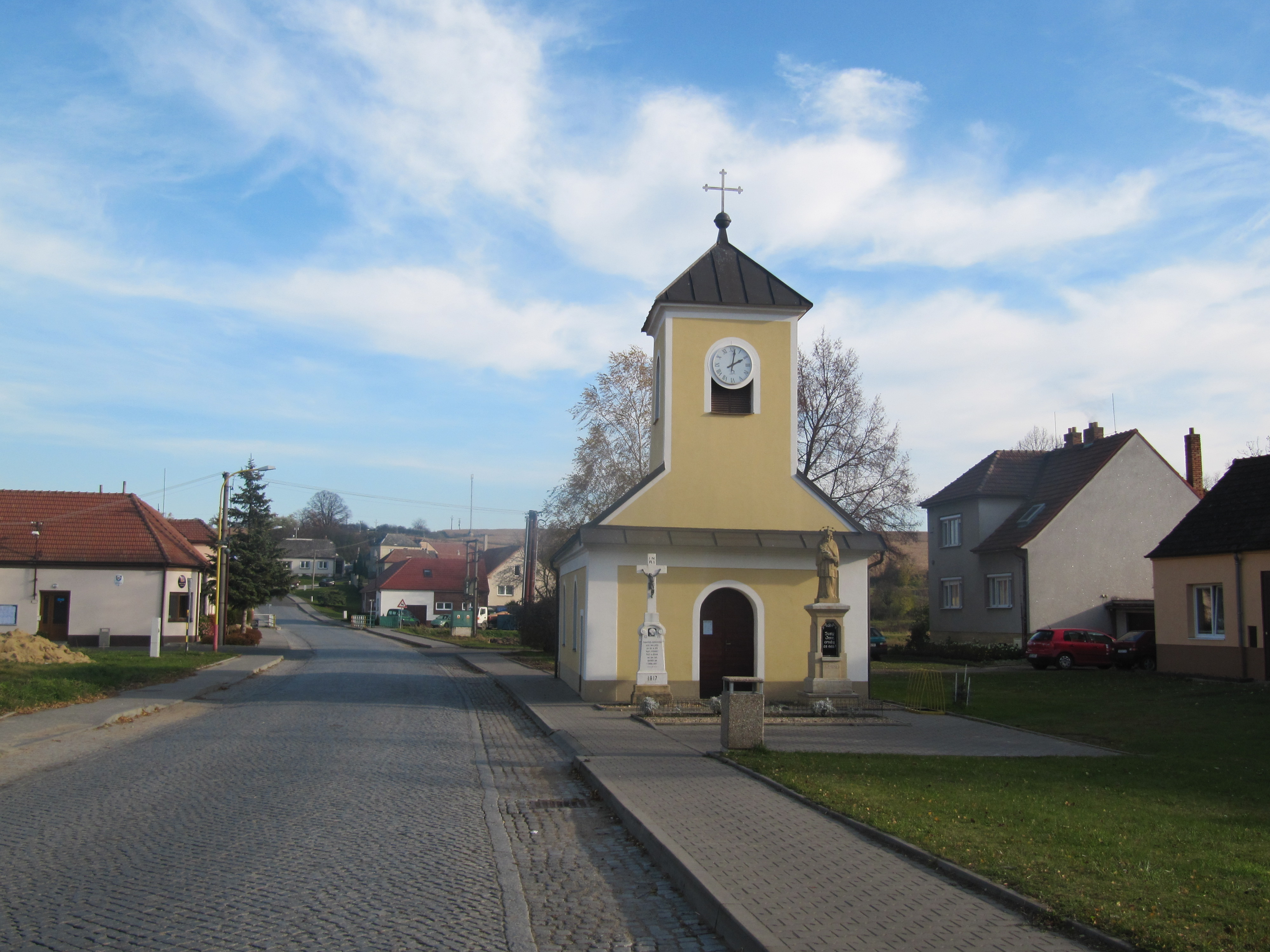
- Chapel of the Assumption of the Virgin Mary

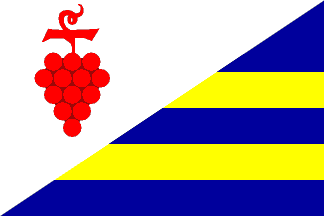
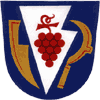
- Flag Coat of arms

- Location in the Czech Republic
- Coordinates: 49°0′6″N 17°15′54″E
- Country: Czech Republic
- Region: South Moravian
- District: Hodonín
- First mentioned: 1371

Area
  - Total: 3.79 km^{2} (1.46 sq mi)
- Elevation: 210 m (690 ft)

Population (2026-01-01)
  - Total: 904
  - Density: 239/km^{2} (618/sq mi)
- Time zone: UTC+1 (CET)
  - Summer (DST): UTC+2 (CEST)
- Postal code: 696 84
- Website: www.temice.cz

Těmice (German: Temnitz) is a municipality and village in Hodonín District in the South Moravian Region of the Czech Republic. It has about 900 inhabitants.

Těmice lies approximately 20 kilometres (12 mi) north-east of Hodonín, 53 km (33 mi) south-east of Brno, and 239 km (149 mi) south-east of Prague.

== Demographics ==
Historical population
Year	Pop.	±%
1869	449	—
1880	514	+14.5%
1890	596	+16.0%
1900	624	+4.7%
1910	704	+12.8%
1921	693	−1.6%
1930	648	−6.5%
1950	791	+22.1%
1961	929	+17.4%
1970	840	−9.6%
1980	875	+4.2%
1991	869	−0.7%
2001	861	−0.9%
2011	875	+1.6%
2021	866	−1.0%
Source: Censuses

== Notable people ==
- Josef Kolmaš (1933–2021), sinologist and tibetologist
