= Daniel Krištof =

Czech politician (1979–2025)

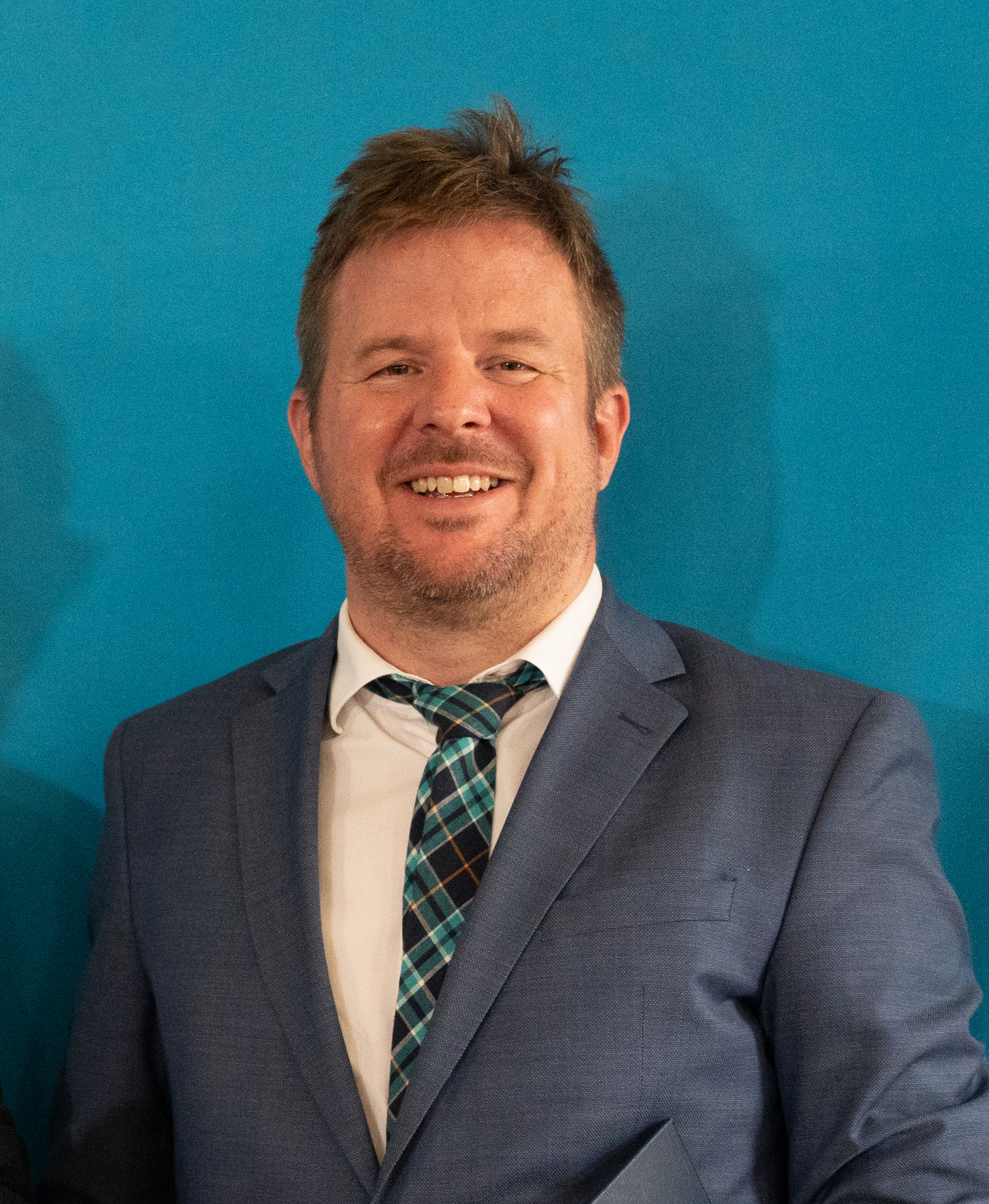
- Krištof in 2024
- Born: 28 February 1979; Czechoslovakia
- Died: 31 October 2025 (aged 46); Czech Republic
- Education: Charles University
- Occupations: psychologist, politician.

Daniel Krištof (28 February 1979 – 31 October 2025) was a Czech psychologist and politician.

== Life and career ==
Krištof was born 28 February 1979. From 1997 to 2002 he studied psychology of work and organization and clinical psychology at the Faculty of Arts of Charles University in Prague.

In 2023, he applied for the position of Director General of the Labour Office of the Czech Republic after the dismissed Viktor Najmon. He won in the competition of five other candidates and was appointed to the position by the Minister of Labour and Social Affairs, Marian Jurečka, with effect from 1 September 2023.

Krištof died from pancreatic cancer on 31 October 2025, at the age of 46.
