= Eva Hauserová =

Czech journalist and writer (1954–2023)

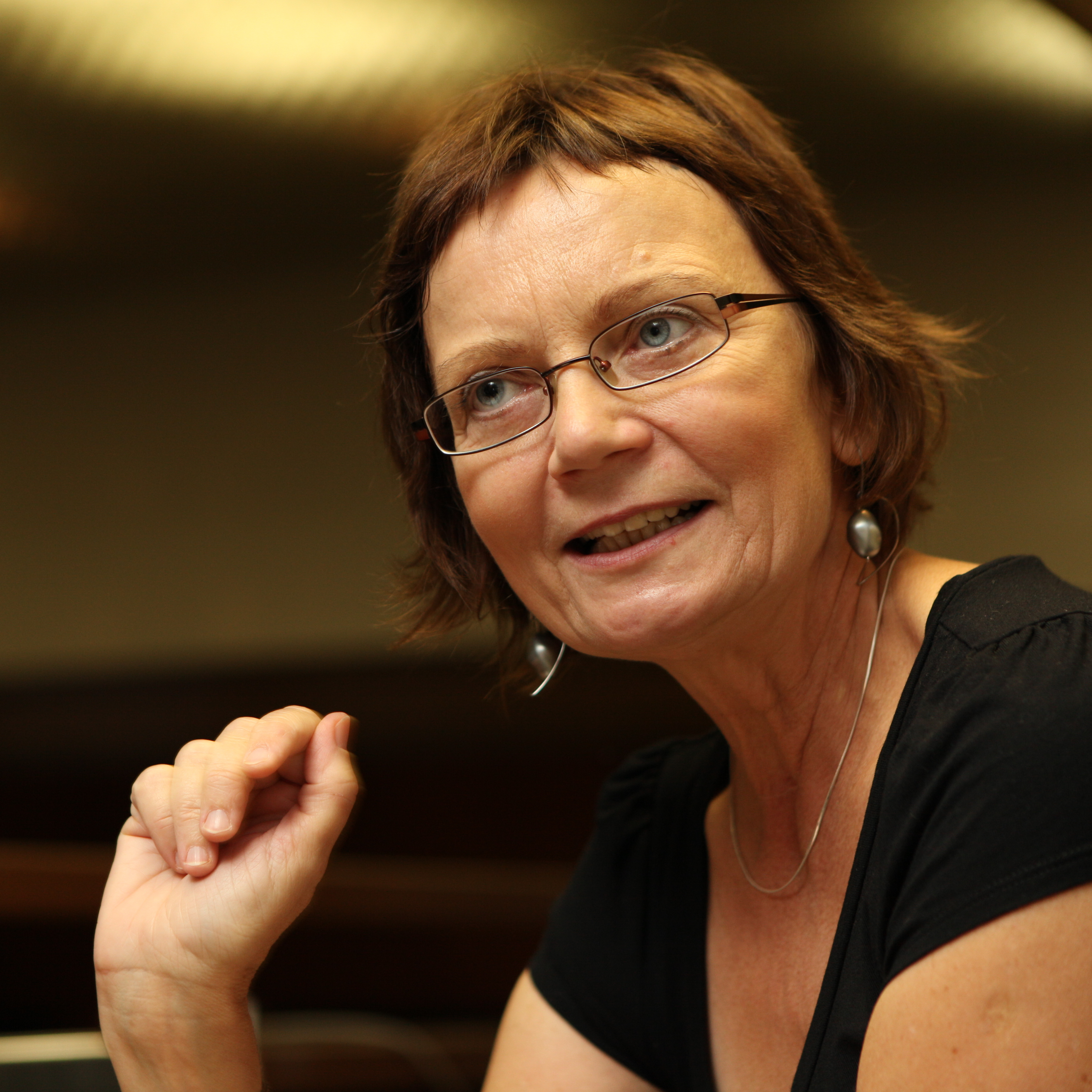
Hauserová in 2009

Eva Hauserová (25 November 1954 – 22 December 2023) was a Czech journalist, sci-fi and non-fiction writer and feminist.

== Biography ==
Hauserová was born in Prague on 25 November 1954. She graduated in Biology from the Charles University in Prague. Hauserová worked for Czech Academy of Sciences and later as an assistant editor in several publishing houses.

Hauserová was a key figure in the Prague science fiction scene since the early 1980s.

Hauserová died on 22 December 2023, at the age of 69.

== Selected works ==
- Hostina mutagenů, Svoboda 1992
- Cvokyně, Ivo Železný 1992
- Zrání Madly v sedmi krocích, ROD Brno 2000
- Blues zmražené kočky, Šťastný 2005
- Na koštěti se dá i lítat, LN, Praha 1995
- Jsi přece ženská, Grada, Praha 1998
