= Ctibor Turba =

Czech actor and director (1944–2025)

Ctibor Turba (16 October 1944 – 30 June 2025) was a Czech actor of non-verbal theatre, mime, screenwriter, teacher and director. His work has been described as the first and pioneering Czech contribution to the global "Contemporary circus' movement.

== Life and career ==
Turba was born in Mariánské Lázně on 16 October 1944. When he was six years old, the family moved to Brno, where he studied at the Secondary School of Applied Arts, majoring in toy and puppetry. He then worked as a designer at the Radost puppet theatre in Brno, the Spejbl and Hurvínek Theatre in Prague and in film studios in Zlín with Hermína Týrlová and Karel Zeman. Later, in 1968, he studied theatre science for two semesters at the Faculty of Arts of Charles University in Prague.

In 2004, he founded the Studio of Clown Stage and Film Production as part and parcel of the Theatre Faculty of the Janáček Academy of Music and Performing Arts and led it until 2008, when it was taken over by the French dancer and choreographer Pierre Nadaud in September 2008.

In 2013, he received the Ministry of Culture Award for his contribution to theatre.

Turba died on 30 June 2025, at the age of 80.
