= Kristina Taberyová =

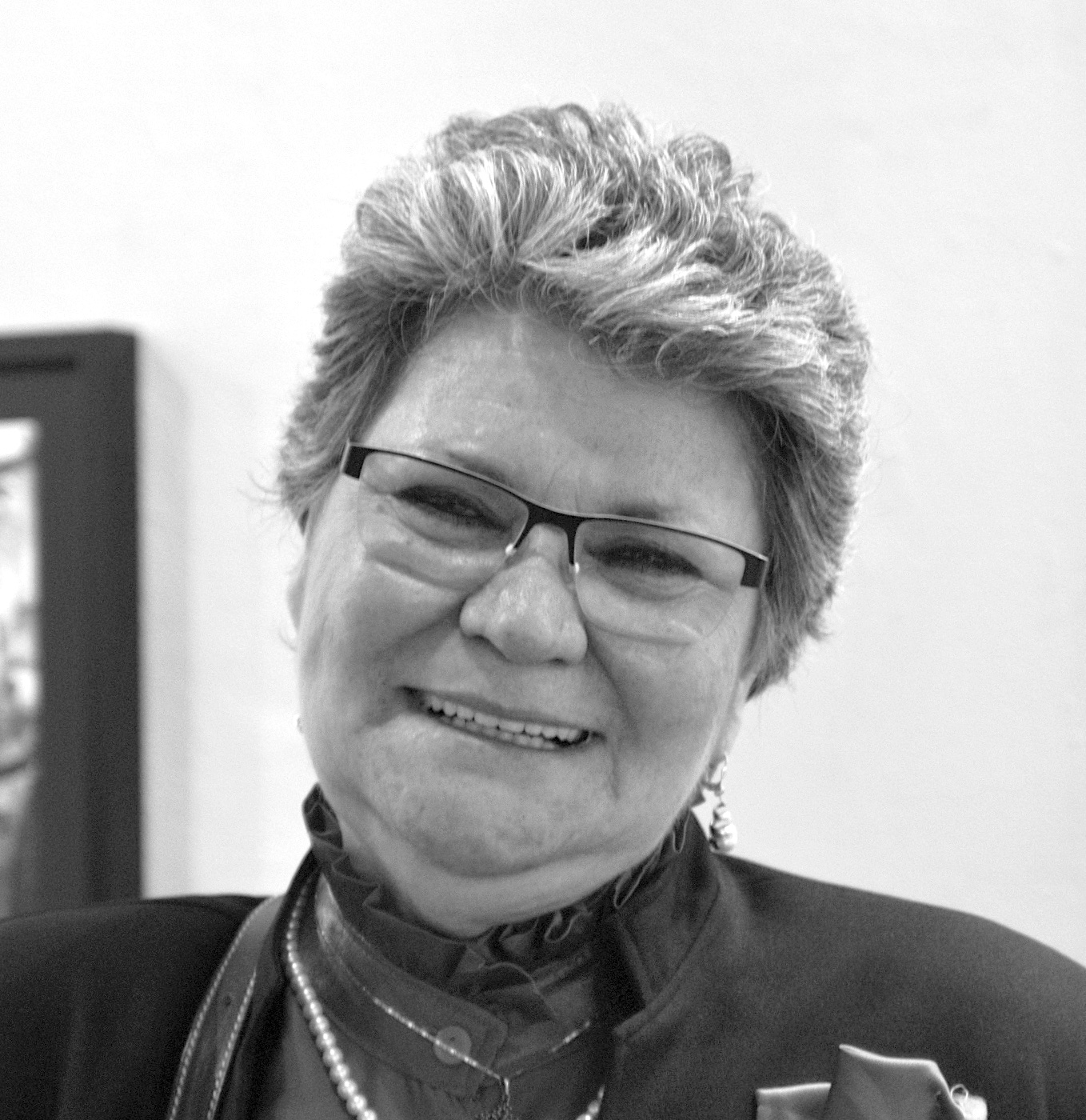
Taberyová in 2014

Kristina Taberyová (24 July 1951 – 19 January 2023) was a Czech theatre director, screenwriter and dramaturg.

== Life ==
Taberyová was born on 24 July 1951 in Železná Ruda. She was the daughter of the actor Zdenek Štěpánek and Sona Grossová. Her siblings were actors Martin Štěpánek, Petr Štěpánek and Jana Štěpánková.

She graduated from the Theatre Faculty of the Academy of Performing Arts in Prague (DAMU). After her debut at the South Bohemian Theatre in České Budějovice, she worked at the J. K. Tyl Theatre in Plzeň. From 1978 to 1989, she directed 21 plays. She also worked as a director at Czech Television.

At the beginning of the 1990s, she was a co-founder of the organization People in Need.

She died on 19 January 2023 in Prague, at the age of 71.
