= George Brooks (jeweler) =

Czechoslovak-born American jeweller (1925–2023)

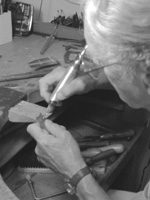
- Brooks at work, 1998
- Born: George Rybnicek; September 11, 1925; Brno, Czechoslovakia
- Died: July 21, 2023 (aged 97); Santa Barbara, California, U.S.
- Education: École des beaux-arts de Montréal
- Known for: Jewelry design
- Spouse: Jean Brooks
- Website: http://www.georgebrooksjewelry.com

George Brooks (born George Rybnicek, September 11, 1925 – July 21, 2023) was a Czechoslovak-born American jeweller. He was one of the first designers and fabricators of modernist and wearable art jewelry in Canada, and later relocated to Santa Barbara, California.

== Early life and education ==
Born George Rybnicek in Brno, Czechoslovakia on September 11, 1925, Brooks immigrated with his mother and sisters to Montreal, Quebec, Canada in 1931. His father was already living and working in Montreal as a tailor.

After studying electrical engineering in college, Brooks chose to focus on visual arts. He attended the École des beaux-arts de Montréal, where he studied sculpture and metalsmithing, and served apprenticeships with local jewelers before opening his own shop.

== Career ==
Silver brooch (1950). Forged from a single sheet.

Gold & silver bracelet (1960). With turquoises

Gold & silver pendant (1967). With diamond & pearl.

White gold pendant (1967). With diamond & pearl.

Brooks's first apprenticeship was as a goldsmith with Henry Birks and Sons in 1948. He also set up a workshop at home where he could produce his own unique designs, markedly different to the conventional jewelry produced by Birks & Sons. In 1950, he transferred his apprenticeship to Georges Delrue, a French avant-garde jeweler based in Montreal since 1947. Delrue's work was influenced by European modernism, such as the work of Jean Arp, Joan Miró, and Jacques Lipchitz, and his workshop was the first modernist jewelry workshop in Canada. Brooks worked with Delrue for seven years, where he learned from craftspeople such as the silversmith Hans Gehrig (1929-1989).

Gehrig and Brooks went on to found the Montreal Gem and Mineral Club in 1957. That same year, Brooks opened his first shop, which he sold in 1961. Brooks and his wife Jean then travelled, visiting gem sources around the world, including mining for opals, in Andamooka, South Australia. Brooks became a recognised authority on opals, amassing one of the world's largest collections of this gemstone.

In 1962 Brooks relocated to Santa Barbara, California, where he continued working and producing unique, one-of-a-kind pieces of jewelry until his retirement in 1991.

== Exhibitions and legacy ==
Yvonne J. Markowitz, Curator of Jewelry at the Museum of Fine Arts, Boston, co-wrote an essay on Brooks for a book on his work published in 2010, in which she argued that Brooks's work had been largely overlooked due to "an accident of geography." In 1962, Santa Barbara was a small town which, although wealthy enough to enable Brooks to succeed enough that he had no need to publicise his work more widely, did not have the community to support modernist jewelers that existed elsewhere, such as San Francisco or Provincetown, Massachusetts. She also noted that the "pioneering modernists" in Canadian jewelry design had worked in relative isolation, with few links to the American or European studio jewelry movement.

In 2009, the Musée des maîtres et artisans du Québec held an exhibition on modernist art jewelry in Québec between 1950 and 1970, which showcased the work of Brooks alongside that of Delrue, Gehrig, and other Canadian jewelers.

Jewelry by Brooks is represented in the collections of several museums and institutions, including the Renwick Gallery, and the Museum of Fine Arts, Boston.

== Death ==
Brooks died in Santa Barbara on July 21, 2023, at the age of 97.
