= Most restaurant explosion =

2025 explosion at a restaurant

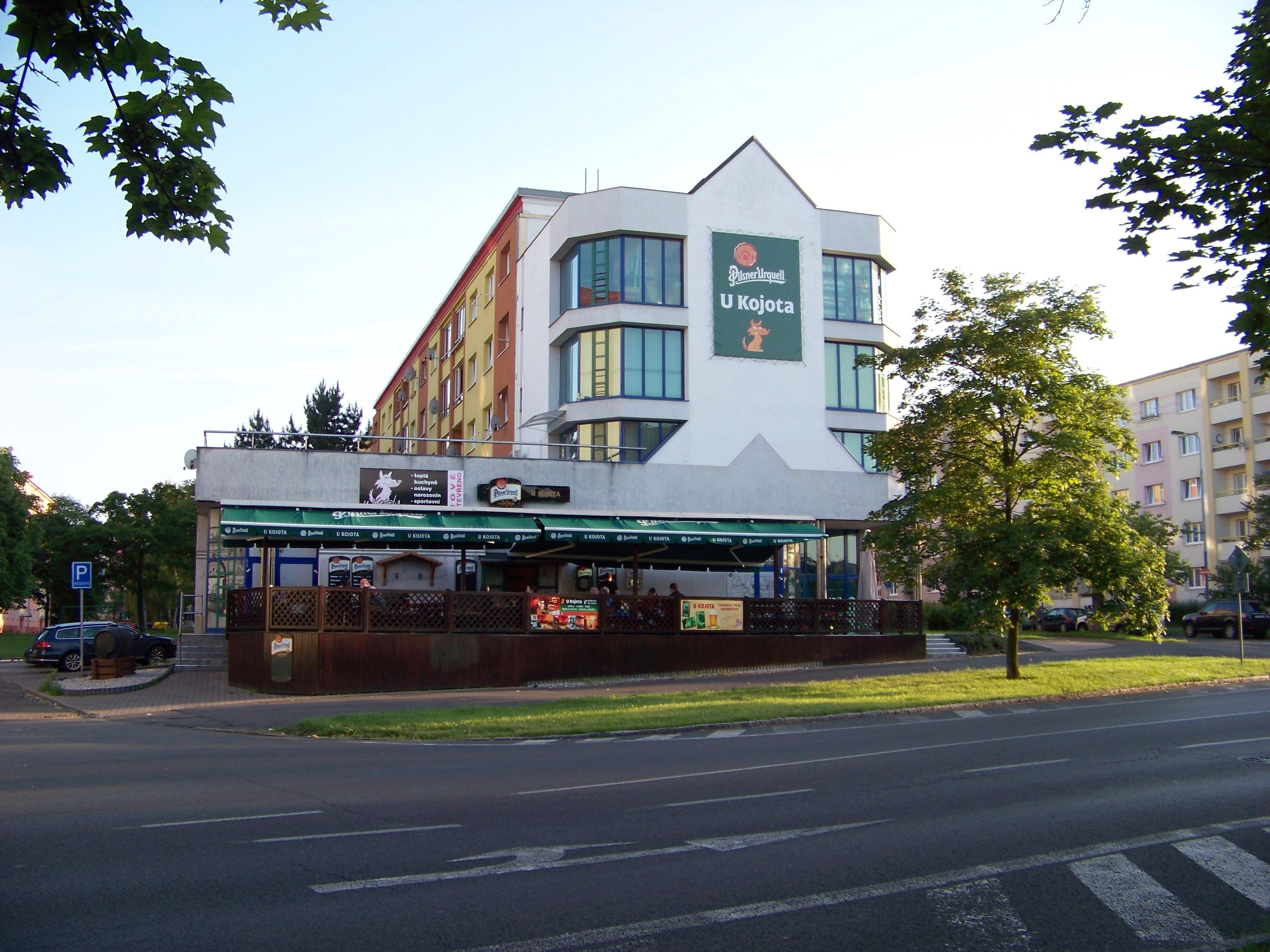
- The U Kojota restaurant in 2014
- Native name: Výbuch restaurace v Mostě
- Date: 11 January 2025
- Time: 11:17 p.m. (CET)
- Duration: 3 hours
- Venue: U Kojota restaurant
- Location: 1443 Františka Halase Street, Most, Ústí nad Labem Region, Czech Republic; 50°30′2.02″N 13°38′11″E
- Type: Propane tank gas explosion
- Cause: Overturning of a gas heating lamp
- Deaths: 7 (including a victim who died on 15 January)
- Injuries: 7

On 11 January 2025, at around 11:17 p.m., an explosion occurred at the U Kojota restaurant in Most, Czech Republic, killing seven people and injuring seven others, including three critically.

== Background ==
The U Kojota (At Coyote's in English) is a restaurant and pub located at 1443 Františka Halase Street. Zdeněk Šlampa, head of the food hygiene department of the Regional Hygiene Station of the Ústí nad Labem Region, said that although the restaurant had a permit to be built, the restaurant extension where the explosion occurred was unauthorized, intentionally illegally built, and did not have a permit to be constructed. The extension was hid under a tarpaulin.

== Explosion ==
According to witnesses and the fire department, there was improper handling of the gas heater, which caused an explosion and fire to spread rapidly at the restaurant's front garden. At the time of the explosion, the conditions were freezing and 20 people were inside of the restaurant, and were trapped inside after the explosion. The flames reached a height of up to three meters and also affected a neighboring house. During the fire, several other propane butane cylinders exploded. 90 firefighters and 28 fire trucks from 19 units arrived on the scene within six minutes and evacuated approximately 20 people from the restaurant and 10 residents of a neighboring house. The fire was brought under control by 1 a.m.

== Victims ==
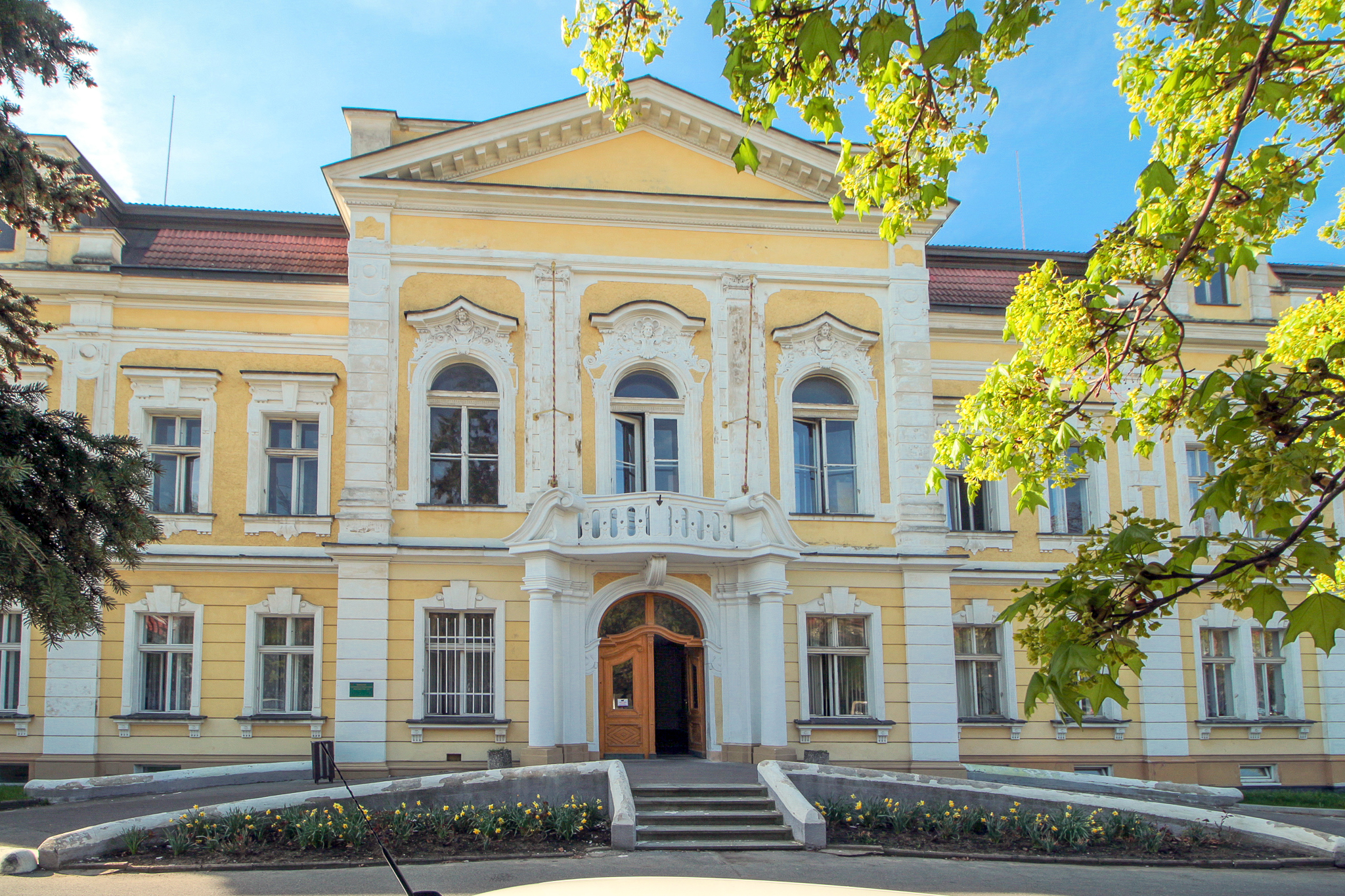
The Královské Vinohrady hospital

Six people were killed and eight others were injured in the explosion. The victims were identified as four men and three women. Rescue workers transported six seriously injured patients to specialized hospitals, with three of them in critical condition and the others seriously injured the following evening. One of the critically injured people, a 59-year-old woman who was celebrating her birthday at U Kojota, died on 15 January at Královské Vinohrady hospital in Prague, after sustaining 92% burns to her body.

== Aftermath ==
The restaurant was destroyed and the wooden extension part of the restaurant where the explosion occurred was torn down and cut up by officers with special saws due to structural damage and danger.

Firefighters started checking the safety of structures and closed front gardens across the Czech Republic in February due to the explosion.

== Responses ==
Czech police launched investigations of the explosion into a potential case of general danger caused by negligence. Firefighters are inspecting the stability of the building to ensure a safe investigation.

Czech Interior Minister Vít Rakušan posted his condolences to the people affected by the explosion on Twitter.

== See also ==
- 2013 Prague explosion; another gas explosion in the Czech Republic
