= Hana Vlasáková =

Czech volleyball player (1948–2023)

Personal information
- Nationality: Czech
- Born: 21 June 1948; Prague, Czechoslovakia
- Died: November 2023 (aged 75); Prague, Czech Republic

Sport
- Sport: Volleyball

Hana Vlasáková, married Marcolini (21 June 1948 – 21 November 2023) was a Czech volleyball player. She competed at the 1968 Summer Olympics and the 1972 Summer Olympics. Vlasáková died 21 November 2023, at the age of 75.
