= Zdenka Nemeškalová-Jiroudková =

Czech numismatist and archaeologist (1928–2023)

- Born: 9 April 1928
- Died: 23 June 2023 (aged 95)
- Citizenship: Czech
- Occupations: Numismatist, archaeologist

Zdenka Nemeškalová-Jiroudková (9 April 1928 – 23 June 2023) was a Czech numismatist and archaeologist. She was born in Prague on 9 April 1928.

== Career ==
During her career she studied Czech coin finds, including those of thirteenth-century Venetian coins at Prague Castle and coin finds from Vízmburk. She has worked on national and international numismatic collections, including at the Copenhagen Museum, as well as the finds of Roman coins in Hradec Králové Museum. She specialises in the study of Celtic coinages and has public widely on the subject, including the coin treasure from Starý Kolín. She has also studied the metallurgy of the gold in Celtic staters. She was a pioneer of assessing Czech coin finds within their archaeological contexts. Particular studies have included coins found in West Bohemia.

== Death ==
Nemeškalová-Jiroudková died on 23 June 2023, at the age of 95.

== Publications ==
- 1960, Nález mince v románské bazilice v Teplicích
- 1961, K současným úkolům numismatiky doby římské
- 1963, Římské mince v Čechách a jejich dějinný význam
- 1986, Nález mincí tolarového údobí v Chlečicích, o. Strakonice: (tab. I - IV)
- 1993, Numismatický sborník
- 1998, Keltský poklad ze Starého Kolína
