= Karel Oujezdský =

Czech radio editor and journalist (1946–2025)

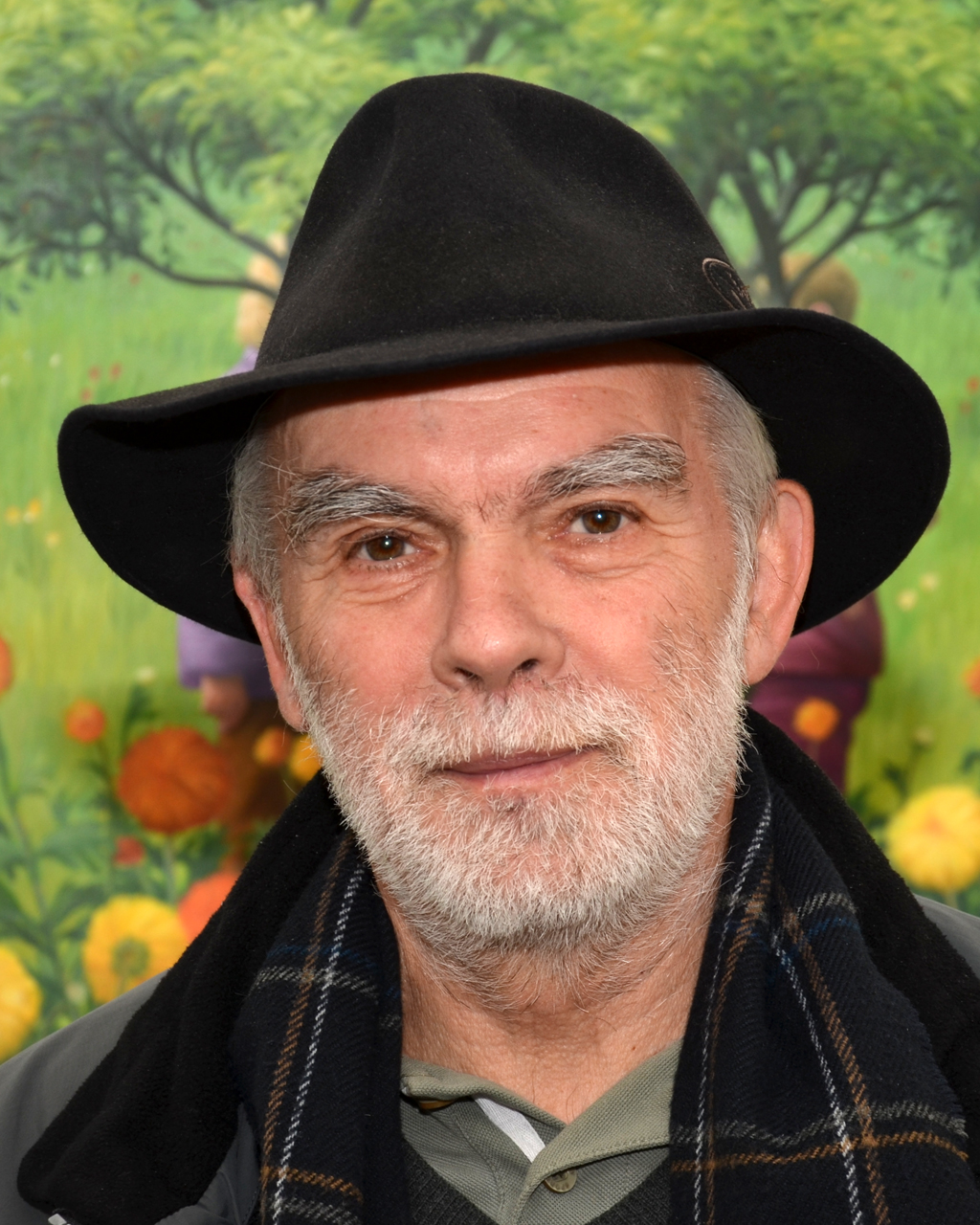
- Oujezdský in 2016
- Born: 19 September 1946; Přerov, Czechoslovakia
- Died: 10 November 2025 (aged 79)
- Occupations: Radio editor, journalist

Karel Oujezdský (19 September 1946 – 10 November 2025) was a Czech radio editor and journalist.

== Life and career ==
Oujezdský was born in Přerov on 19 September 1946. During the normalization period, it was uncommon to work in newspapers and magazines controlled by the Communist Party, so he found employment in the promotion of the Prago Union (1972–1989) and then briefly in Čedok (1989–1990), the Central Automobile Club Prague (1990) and the Czech Centre for the Construction of Architecture Prague (1990–1991).

From December 1991, he was an editor of the ČRo Vltava station of Czech Radio. Here he joined the editorial board of the Kulturní revue program.

In 2008, he was awarded the Rudolf II Prize by the Masaryk Academy of Arts for his systematic promotion of contemporary art in Czech Radio with professional and educational aspects. In December 2015, the Skutek Art Association awarded him honorary membership, which was awarded to Jana and Jiří Šetlík and Jiří Valoch.

Oujezdský died on 10 November 2025, at the age of 79.
