= Petr Charvát =

Czech historian (1949–2023)

Petr Charvát (12 January 1949 – 17 September 2023) was a Czech orientalist, archaeologist and historian. His specialization was the archaeology and history of the Orient and older Czech history.

== Biography ==
Charvát was born in Prague on 12 January 1949 as the son of Zdeněk Charvát and Elena Charvátová. He spent part of his childhood in Baghdad, where his father served as a professor at university. He studied history and archaeology at the Faculty of Arts of Charles University from 1967 before switching to cuneiform and archaeology which he studied from 1968 to 1973. In the meantime, after studying at the Faculty of Arts for a year he went to study at the University of Lagos for a year. He defended his MA thesis from cuneiform in 1973. Two years later, in 1975, he gained his PhDr. (doctor of Philosophy). From 1975 to 1990 he worked at the Archaeological Institute of the Czechoslovak Academy of Sciences. In 1980, he was awarded the title of Candidate of Historical Sciences (CSc.) based on his dissertation in the field of medieval archaeology. From 1990 to 2005, he worked at the Oriental Institute of the Academy of Sciences of the Czech Republic in Prague's Malá Strana. He died on 17 September 2023, at the age of 74.

He was married to historian Kateřina Charvátová. They have two sons. He appeared on Czech Television in the program Dvaasedmdesát jmen české historie.

His specialization was broad, it consisted of cuneiform and archaeology of prehistoric and ancient southwestern Asia, the emergence of primary statehood and script-using civilizations at the turn between prehistory and antiquity in this region, the formation of the Přemyslid state in early medieval Bohemia, long-distance contacts of the Czech lands in the Middle Ages with special regard to non-European areas.

== Career and research ==
From 2006, he taught at the Faculty of Arts of the University of West Bohemia in Plzeň. Additionally, he lectured on history at the Pedagogical Faculty of Charles University.

In 1974 he participated in an archaeological excavation of the tomb of the nobleman Ptahshepses in Abusir near Saqqara, Egypt, 25th century BCE). From 1982 to 1984 he took part in an excavation of a Buddhist monastery from the 1st millennium AD, Abhayagiri Vihara in Anuradhapura, Sri Lanka, joint project of the Sri Lankan government and UNESCO. In 1989 he participated in an excavation of Jemdet Nasr near Baghdad, as part of the British Archaeological Expedition in Iraq. His study stays included Berlin (1992), Poitiers, Paris (short trips in 1995–2001 and 2006–2008). From 1996, he was a member of the Spanish archaeological mission in Turkey.

He obtained the title of Doctor of Historical Sciences (DrSc.) in 1995 based on the monograph Ancient Mesopotamia – Humankind’s Long Journey into Civilization (Prague: The Oriental Institute 1993). In 1995, he habilitated in the field of Slavic archaeology at Masaryk University in Brno based on the work On Slavs, silk and the early state: The town of Čáslav in the pristine Middle Ages (Památky archeologické 85/1, 1994, pp. 108–153). On 24 June 2011, President Václav Klaus appointed him professor.

He spent the academic year 2003–2004 in Philadelphia, United States, on a John William Fulbright Foundation scholarship (studying archaeological material from the ancient Near East at the Museum of Archaeology and Anthropology, University of Pennsylvania). In 2008, he was invited to give lectures on long-distance contacts of the Czech lands with the Orient and on Czech statehood in the early Middle Ages at the École pratique des hautes études in Paris, in its Section des sciences historiques et philologiques. Course title: Les voies du commerce avec l’Orient, les trouvailles de monnaies islamiques et la naissance de l’étatisme chez les Slaves occidentaux au Haut Moyen Âge. He also worked in 2011–2012 at the University of Cologne as a Fellow (member) of the international MORPHOMATA college, as the principal investigator of the project “History from bits of clay: The Sumerian early state of Ur at the beginning of the third millennium B.C.”

The publication Kolaps a regenerace: cesty civilizací a kultur (Prague: Academia 2011) edited by M. Bárta and M. Kovář, to which Petr Charvát contributed as an author, received the Rector's Prize of Charles University in Prague for the creative achievement of the year. In 2012, for the book Zrození státu (Prague, Karolinum 2011), he received the Josef Hlávka Prize for the best Czech-language scientific publication of 2011.

== Selected publications ==
- The pottery. The mastaba of Ptahshepses. Prague: Charles University, 1981.
- Ancient Mesopotamia. Humankind’s Long Journey into Civilization. Prague: Akademie věd České republiky, Orientální ústav, 1993. ISBN 80-85425-11-4.
- On people, signs and states. Spotlights on Sumerian society, c. 3500-2500 B.C. Prague: Akademie věd České republiky, Orientální ústav, 1998. ISBN 80-85425-28-9.
- Mesopotamia Before History. London; New York : Routledge, Taylor and Francis Group, 2002. ISBN 0-415-25104-4.
- The iconography of pristine statehood. Painted pottery and seal impressions from Susa, southwestern Iran. Prague: Karolinum, 2005. ISBN 80-246-0964-9.
- The Emergence of the Bohemian State. Leiden; Boston: Brill, 2010. ISSN 1872-8103, ISBN 978-90-04-18009-3.
- Signs from silence. Ur of the first Sumerians. Prague: Charles University; Karolinum, 2017. ISBN 978-80-246-3130-1.
