= Mahulena Čejková =

Czech politician (1936–2023)

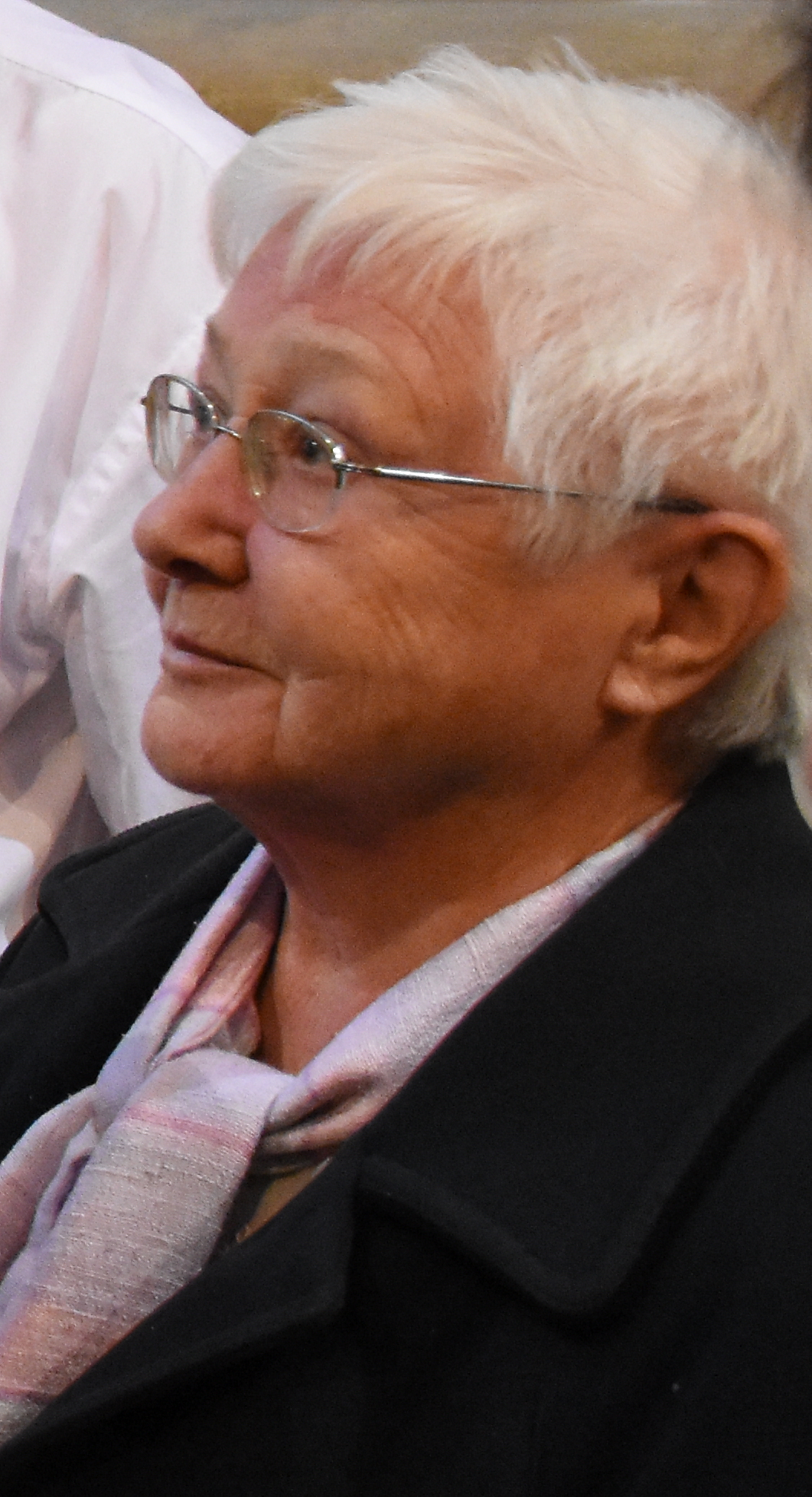
- Čejková in 2015

Member of the Federal Assembly of Czechoslovakia
- In office 1990–1992

Personal details
- Born: 23 August 1936 Mladá Boleslav, Czechoslovakia
- Died: 21 April 2023 (aged 86)
- Party: OF; OH
- Education: Charles University
- Occupation: Medical doctor

Mahulena Čejková (23 August 1936 – 21 April 2023) was a Czech medical doctor and politician. A member of the Civic Forum and Civic Movement, she served in the Federal Assembly from 1990 to 1992. In 1994–1998, she served in the Děčín City Council. In 1996 Czech Senate election, she ran unsuccessfully for the Senate as a member of Czech National Social Party.

Čejková died on 21 April 2023, at the age of 86.
