= Karel Holomek =

Czech politician (1937–2023)

Member of the Czech National Council
- In office 1990–1992

Personal details
- Born: 6 March 1937 Brno, Czechoslovakia
- Died: 27 August 2023 (aged 86)
- Party: OF; ROI
- Education: Military Academy in Brno
- Occupation: Mechanical engineer

Karel Holomek (6 March 1937 – 27 August 2023) was a Czech mechanical engineer and politician. A member of the Civic Forum, he served in the Czech National Council from 1990 to 1992.

In 2002, Czech president Václav Havel awarded him the Medal of Merit, 3rd grade.

Holomek died on 27 August 2023, at the age of 86.
