= Jorga Kotrbová =

Czech actress (1947–2025)

- Born: 26 April 1947; Prague, Czechoslovakia
- Died: 24 November 2025 (aged 78); Czech Republic
- Education: DAMU
- Occupations: Actress; voice actress
- Years active: 1961–2003

Jorga Kotrbová (26 April 1947 – 24 November 2025) was a Czech actress and voice actress.

== Life and career ==
Kotrbová was born in Prague on 26 April 1947. Her first role came at the age of 14, when director Karel Kachyňa cast her in the lead role in The Stress of Youth (1962).

She also worked as a dubbing actress, with notable roles including M.A.S.H., and the British series Randall and Hopkirk.

In 2021, she won the František Filipovský Award for long-term acting mastery in dubbing.

== Death ==
Kotrbová died on 24 November 2025, at the age of 78.
