= History of the Czech lands =

The history of the Czech lands – an area roughly corresponding to the present-day Czech Republic (Bohemia, Moravia and Czech Silesia) – starts approximately 800,000 years BCE. A simple chopper from that age was discovered at the Red Hill (Czech: Červený kopec) archaeological site in Brno. Many different primitive cultures left their traces throughout the Stone Age, which lasted approximately until 2000 BCE. The most widely known culture present in the Czech lands during the pre-historical era is the Únětice Culture, leaving traces for about five centuries from the end of the Stone Age to the start of the Bronze Age. Celts – who came during the 5th century BCE – are the first people known by name. One of the Celtic tribes were the Boii (plural), who gave the Czech lands their first name Boiohaemum – Latin for the Land of Boii. Before the beginning of the Common Era the Celts were mostly pushed out by Germanic tribes. The most notable of those tribes were the Marcomanni and traces of their wars with the Roman Empire were left in south Moravia.

After the turbulence of the Migration Period, the Czech lands were ultimately conquered by the Slavic tribes. The year of 623 marks the formation of the first known state in the Czech lands, when Samo united the local Slavic tribes, defended their lands from the Avars to the east and, years later, won the Battle of Wogastisburg against the westward invading Franks. The next state recorded in the Czech lands following the dissolution of the Samo's realm was likely Great Moravia. The center of its power lay in Moravia, which includes present-day western Slovakia. In 863, Cyril and Methodius, two scholars from Greece, brought Christianity to the Great Moravia and established the first Slavic script – Glagolitsa. Great Moravia lasted until its fall to Magyar invasions at the start of the 10th century.

A new state formed around the tribe of Premyslids, who founded the Duchy of Bohemia. The duchy existed largely within the sphere of East Franconia, which became the Holy Roman Empire. The duchy sided with the Roman Catholic Church during the East-West Schism and in 1212, the duke Ottokar I was granted the hereditary title of king in reward for his service to the Holy Roman Emperor Frederick II. The Přemyslid dynasty died out at the start of the 14th century and was replaced by the Luxembourg dynasty. The most notable of the Luxembourg rulers was Charles IV, who was elected the Emperor of the Holy Roman Empire. He established the Archbishopric of Prague and Charles University, the first university north of the Alps and east of Paris. The start of the 15th century saw the rise of Proto-Protestant sentiment in the Czech lands. The execution of Jan Hus sparked the Hussite Wars and the religious split that followed them. The Jagiellon dynasty ascended the Czech throne in 1471. They ruled for half a century before the king Louis Jagiellon died in the Battle of Mohács and the empty throne was given to the House of Habsburg.

After the death of the Emperor Rudolf II of Habsburg, the religious and political tensions grew, resulting in the Second Defenestration of Prague, which sparked the Thirty Years' War. Many of the Czech nobles supported the Protestant side and were stripped of their properties as a result. Germanization and counter-reformation of the Czech lands followed. The spread of Romanticism during the late 18th century went in hand with the movement of the Czech National Revival. After 1848, the leading representatives of the Czech National Revival increased their political efforts to gain more autonomy for the Czech lands within the Habsburg Monarchy.

The start of World War I opened the possibility of gaining full independence and formation of a sovereign state. In the Cleveland Agreement of 1915, the Czech and Slovak representatives declared their goal of creating a common state, based on the right of a people to self-determination. After the capitulation of Austria-Hungary three years later, the Czechoslovak Republic became a reality. The First Czechoslovak Republic lasted 20 years, until the breakout of World War II. By the end of World War II, the Communist Party of Czechoslovakia seized power in 1948, and entered Czechoslovakia to the Eastern Bloc. In August 1968, armies of the Warsaw Pact invaded Czechoslovakia to curtail further attempts at reformation of the Communist system. In November 1989, the Velvet Revolution replaced the Communist regime with a democratic Czech and Slovak Federative Republic. Three years later, Czech and Slovak representatives agreed to the Dissolution of Czechoslovakia and the formation of separate states. In 1999, the Czech Republic joined the North Atlantic Treaty Organization (NATO), and in 2004, became a member of the European Union.

== Ancient History ==
=== Stone Age ===
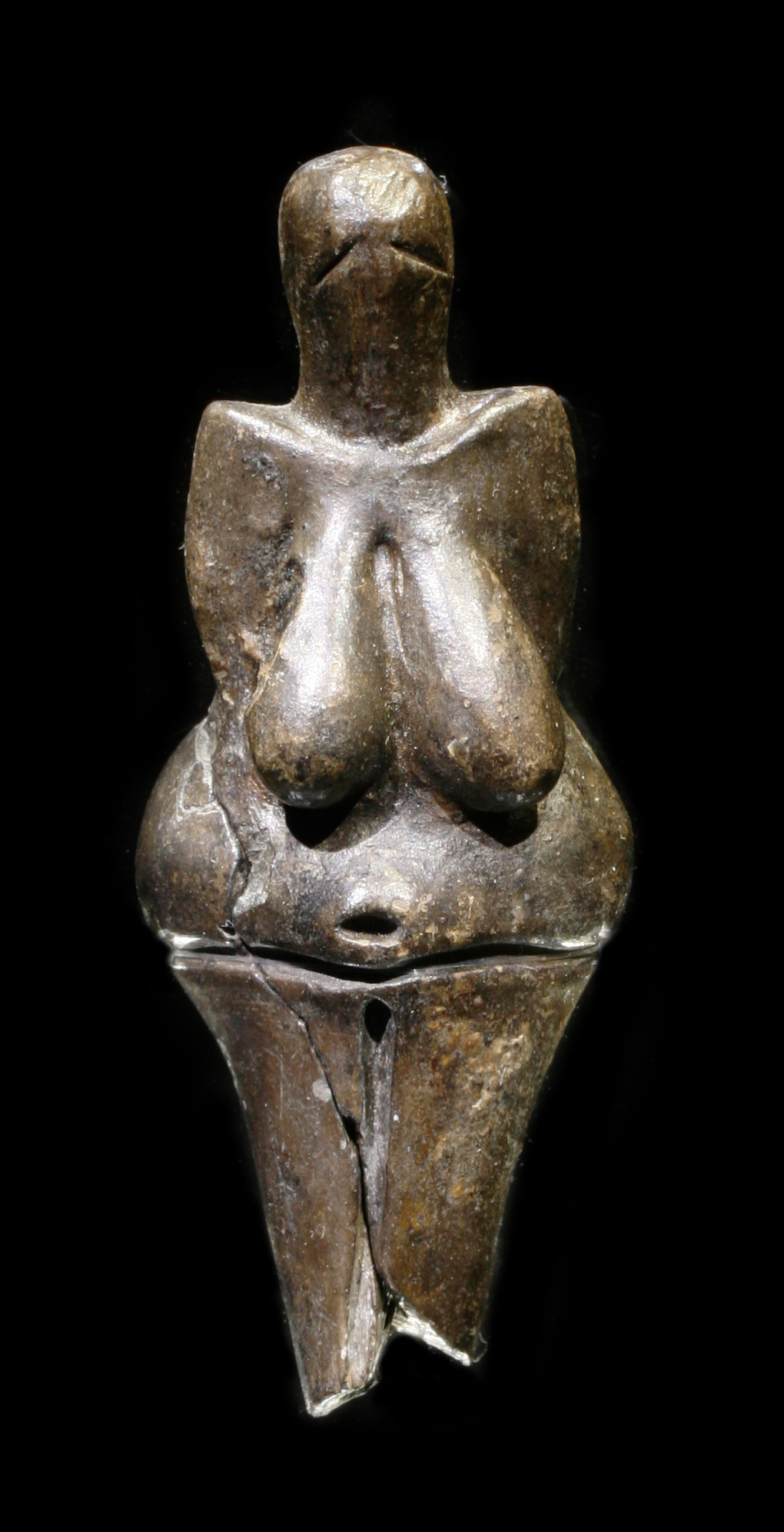
Venus of Dolní Věstonice, the oldest ceramic article in the world

A simple chopper – left by the ancestors of the present-day Homo Sapiens – dated to 800,000 BCE was uncovered in Red Hill in Brno. First evidence of human camps was found in Přezletice near Prague and in Stránská skála near Brno which dates to about 200,000 years after that. Stone tools were found in the Kůlna Cave in central Moravia, with the estimated age of 120,000 years. More stone tools and the skeletal remains of a Neanderthal man were found at the same site in a 50,000-year-old layer.

Human remains from 45,000 years ago were found in Koněprusy Caves in Zlatý kůň at Beroun District. Human remains from 30,000 years BCE were found in Mladeč caves mammoth tusks with complex engravings (again around 30,000 BCE) were found both in Pavlov and Předmostí at Přerov, making south Moravia one of the most important archaeological areas in Europe.

The archaeological site in Předmostí at Přerov represents the largest accumulation of human remains of the Gravettian culture, known for creating so-called Venus figurines. One of such figurines is the famous Venus of Dolní Věstonice (29,000–25,000 BCE) found in Dolní Věstonice in south Moravia along with many other artifacts from that time. Another Venus figurine is the Venus of Petřkovice, found in what is today Ostrava. Remains of mammoth hunters from 22,000 BCE were also found in the aforementioned Kůlna Cave along with the remains of reindeer hunters and horse hunters, dated to about 10,000 years later. Approximately between 5500 and 4500 BCE, people of the Linear Pottery culture resided in Czech lands. Their settlement was discovered in Bylany near Kutná hora. Their culture was succeeded by the Lengyel culture, Funnelbeaker culture and Stroke-ornamented ware culture, which coexisted in the Czech Lands during the end of the Stone Age.

=== Copper Age and Bronze Age ===
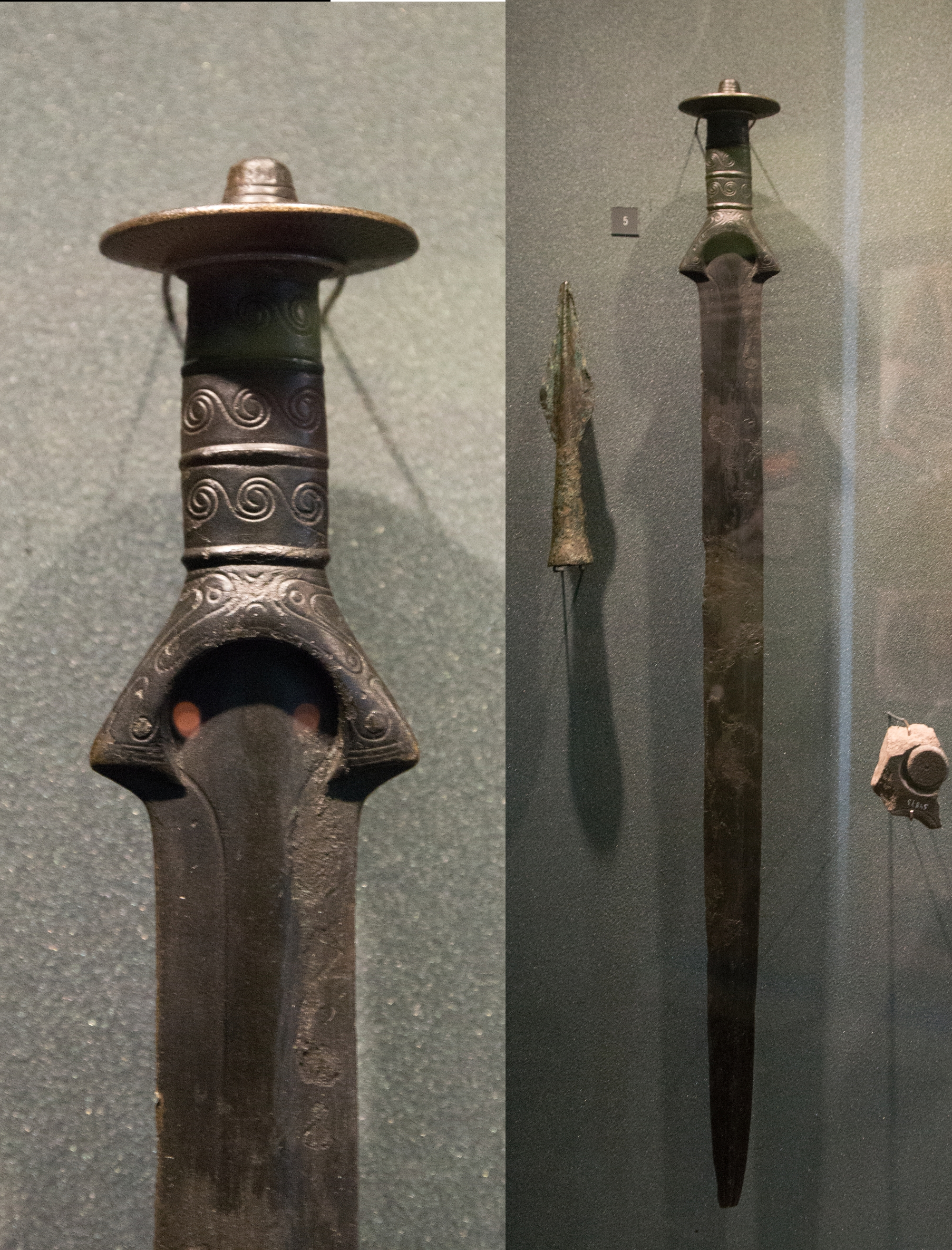
Bronze sword, Urnfield culture, c. 1200 BC

Corded Ware culture in the north and Baden culture in the south were the predominant cultures in the Czech Lands throughout the Copper Age. The Bell Beaker culture represented the transition from the Copper Age to the Bronze Age. With the start of the Bronze Age, Únětice culture appeared. This culture got its name from a village near Prague, where the first discovery was made in the 1870s. Many of their burial mounds were uncovered, mostly in central Bohemia. It was followed by the Middle Bronze Age Tumulus culture from around 1600 BC. The Urnfield culture is blanket term for various Late Bronze Age cultures dating from c. 1300-800 BC who cremated their dead and buried the urns with their ashes. The Hallstatt culture was the last culture of the Late Bronze Age and Early Iron Age. The key archaeological site of the Hallstatt culture in the Czech lands is the Býčí skála Cave, where a rare bronze statue of a bull was found. Many of these archaeological sites were occupied by multiple cultures throughout the ancient times.

=== Iron Age ===
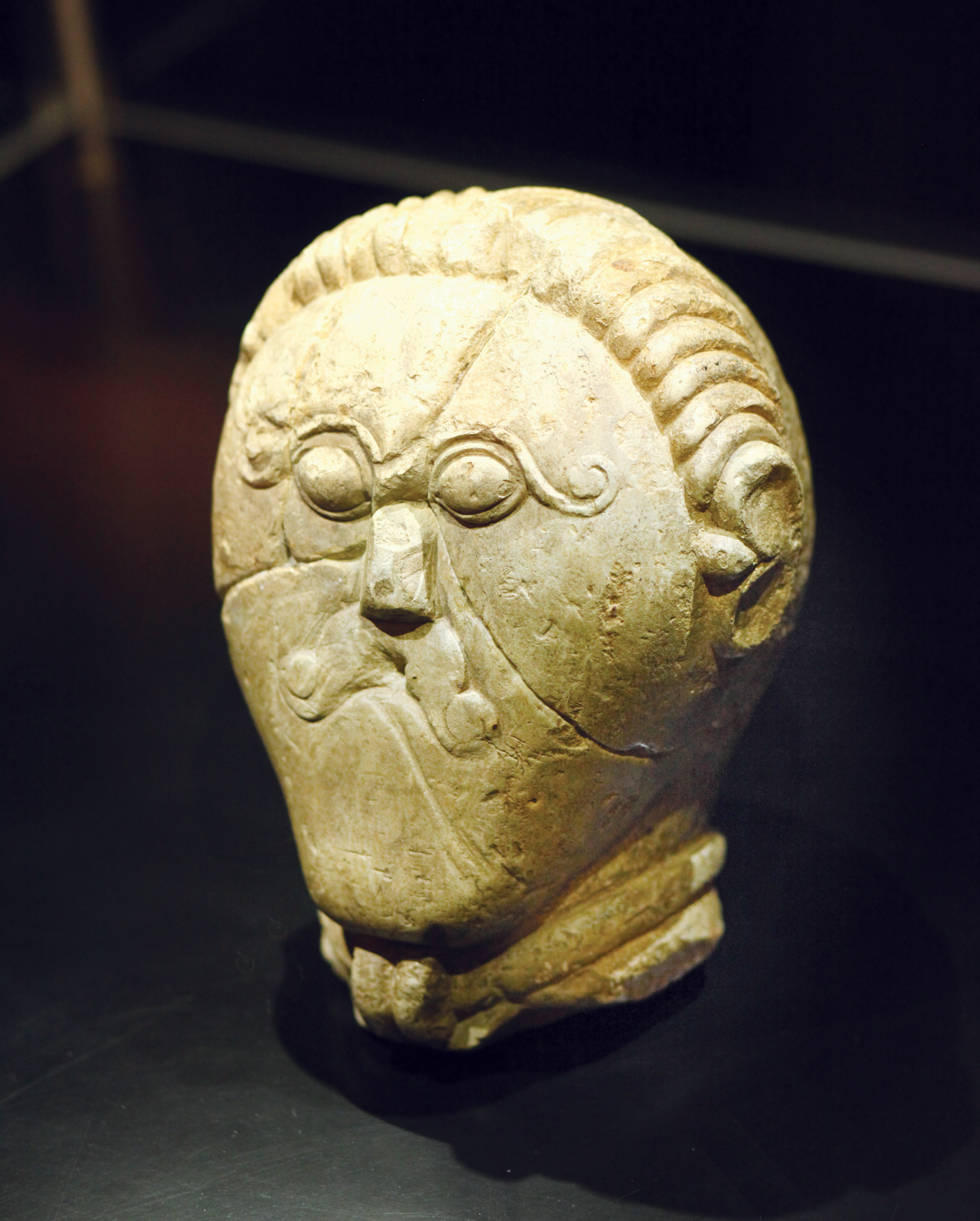
Stone sculpture of a Celtic man, found in Mšecké Žehrovice

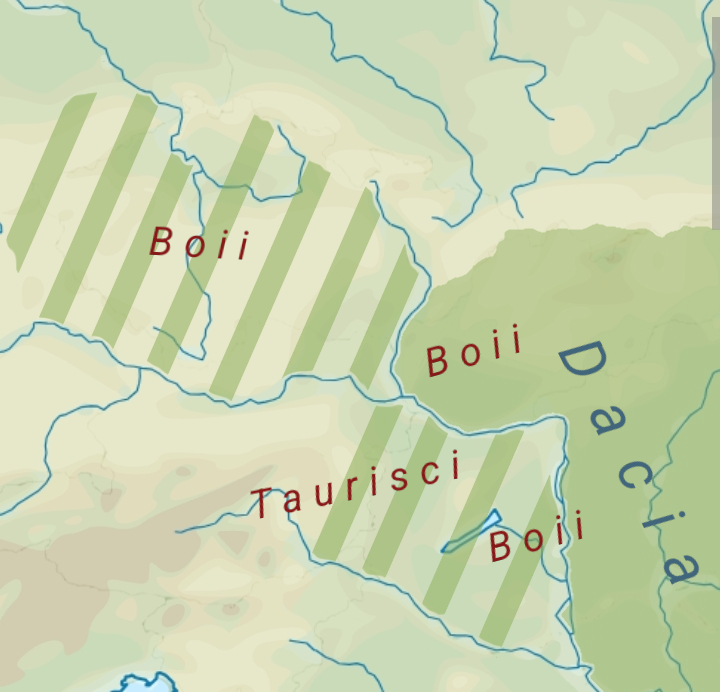
Dacian Influence over Bohemia

What are now the Czech Lands were settled by the Celtic tribes by the start of the Iron Age. The most prominent tribe in Bohemia were the Boii, who gave the region the name of Boiohaemia (Latin for the land of Boii), which later became Bohemia, one of the Czech Lands. Before the start of the 1st century CE, they were pushed out by various Germanic tribes (Marcomanni, Quadi, Lombards). Around 60 to 50 BC, the Dacian king Burebista established an empire that extended its reach into the lands of the Boii. The Dacian occupation primarily affected modern-day Slovakia but also held sway over regions of present-day Czech Republic and Pannonia. Following Burebista's demise in 44 BC, his empire crumbled, liberating the lands of the Boii from Dacian rule. Traces of Roman army camps were found in south Moravia, most notably near Mušov. The winter camp in Mušov was built to house approximately 20,000 soldiers. The Romans were repeatedly at war with the Marcomanni tribe during the first two centuries CE. Germanic towns are described on the Map of Ptolemaios from the 2nd century, e.g. Coridorgis for Jihlava.

=== Arrival of the Slavs ===
The following centuries of what is known as the Great Migration once again changed the ethnic composition of the Czech Lands. In the 6th century, Slavic tribes, displaced by Langobard and Thuringian tribes began to move into the Czech Lands from the east. They fought with neighboring Avars – Turko-Tartar nomads – who seized the Pannonia and frequently raided the Slavic lands and even the Frankish Empire.

=== Samo's realm ===
In 623 – according to the Chronicle of Fredegar – the Slavic tribes revolted against the oppression of the Avars. During this time, the Frankish merchant Samo allegedly came to the Czech lands with his entourage and joined with the Slavs to defeat the Avars. Thus, the Slavs adopted Samo as their ruler. Later Samo and the Slavs came into conflict with the Frankish empire whose ruler Dagobert I wanted to extend his rule to the east. That led to the Battle of Wogastisburg in 631, in which the newly established Realm of Samo successfully defended its autonomy. The realm disintegrated after Samo's death.

== Medieval Times ==
=== Great Moravia ===
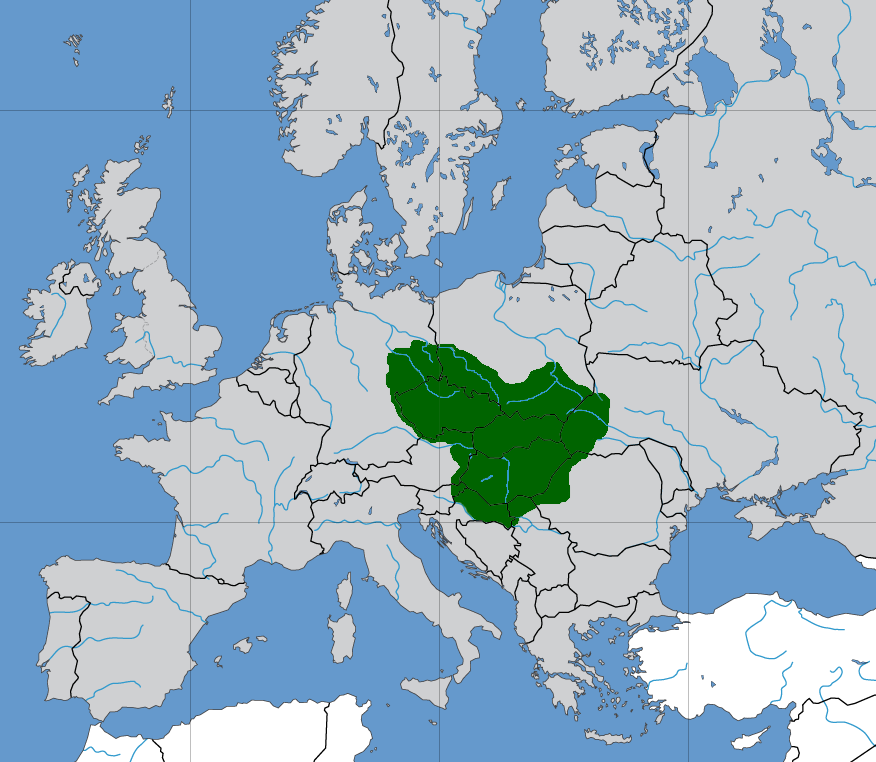
Great Moravia during the reign of Svatopluk I

The realm of Great Moravia probably was established in the area of today's Moravia and western Slovakia in the 830s. It saw the rise of the first ever Slavic literary culture in the Old Church Slavonic language and the creation of the Glagolitic alphabet, the first alphabet dedicated to a Slavic language. Glagolitic was later simplified into the Cyrillic alphabet that is today used in Russia and many countries in eastern Europe and central Asia. Glagolitic was created by St. Cyril and St. Methodius, who arrived in Great Moravia in 863 from Thessaloniki in Byzantine Empire. They were invited by the king Rastislav who invited them to introduce literacy and a legal system to Great Moravia. His nephew and successor Svatopluk I's diplomacy was oriented more towards Rome. Great Moravia was taken under the protection of the Holy See in 880 and six years after, he expelled the disciples of Methodius after their teacher's death. During his reign, Great Moravia's sphere of influence reached its peak. After his death, the realm was split among his sons and soon after fell to ruin due to infighting and constant Magyar raids during the start of the 10th century.

=== Duchy of Bohemia ===
Duchy of Bohemia, c. 1029

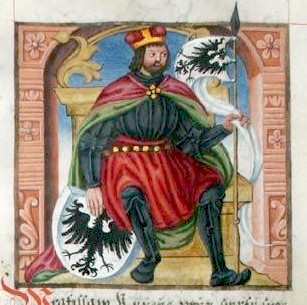
Saint Wenceslaus, Czech prince

Bořivoj from Levý Hradec was the first known member of the Přemyslid dynasty. In 880, he moved his residence to Prague Castle, which laid the foundation of the city of Prague that emerged centuries later. He was a vassal to the kings of Great Moravia and was baptised during the Christianisation of Great Moravia by St. Cyril and St. Methodius. His son Spytihněv I together with the head of another major Bohemian tribe Witizla used the collapse of Great Moravia and in 895 swore allegiance to the East Frankish king Arnulf of Carinthia. Spytihněv's nephew Wenceslaus (later proclaimed a saint by the Catholic Church) ruled from 921 and had to submit to the Saxon king Henry I in order to maintain his ducal authority. He was murdered by his younger brother Boleslaus I. Boleslaus I expanded the Duchy of Bohemia eastwards conquering the lands of Moravia and Silesia and areas around Kraków. He stopped paying tribute to the Saxon king igniting a war which he lost and was forced to recognize Saxon suzerainty over the Duchy of Bohemia. The Bishopric of Prague was founded in 973 during the reign of his son Boleslaus II. The bishopric was subordinated to the Archbishopric of Mainz.

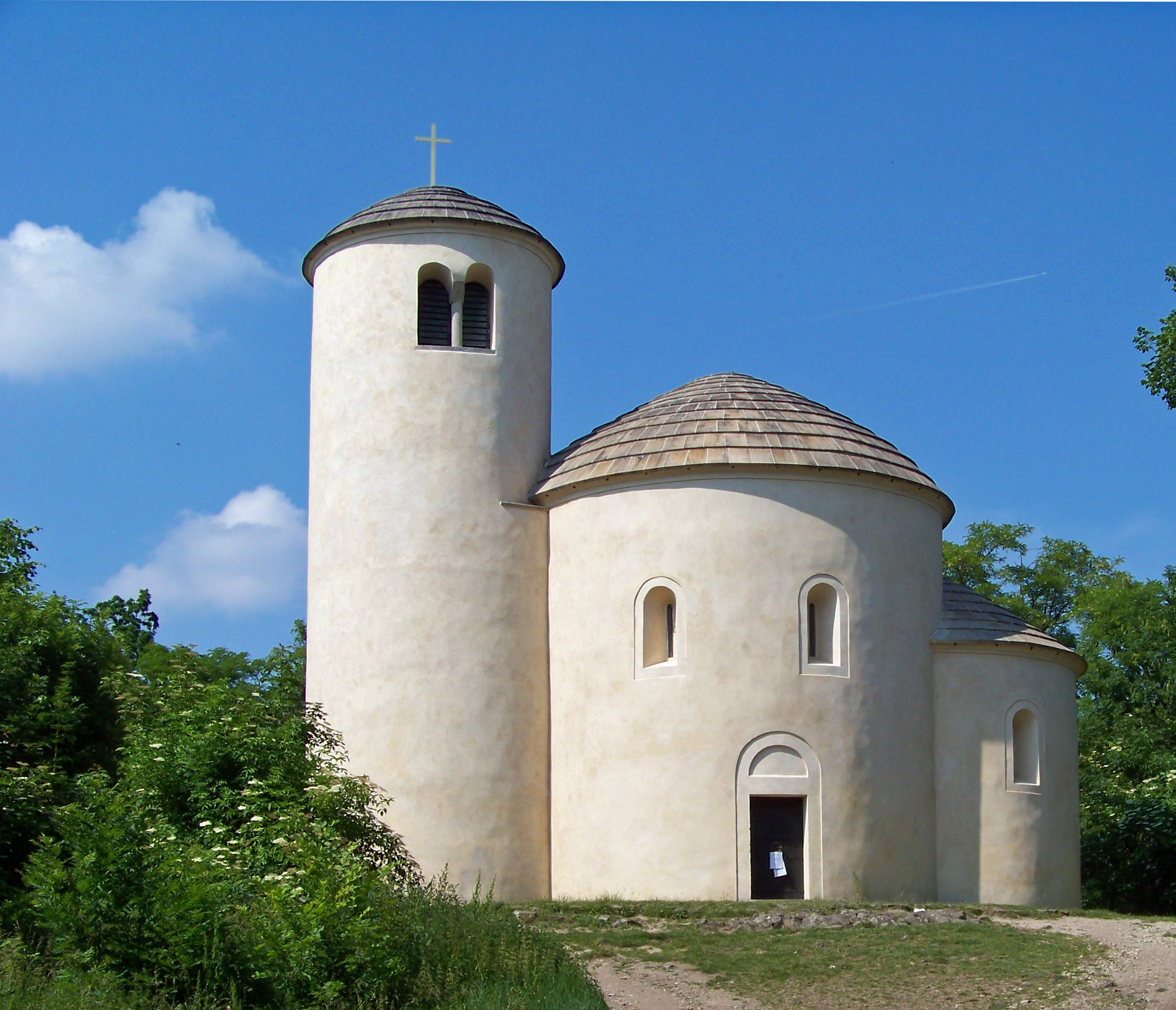
Rotunda of St. George from the beginning of the 12th century on Mount Říp

In 1002, during the reign of the duke Vladivoj, the Duchy of Bohemia formally became a part of the Holy Roman Empire. After a period of dynastic infighting, Oldřich took power. His son Břetislav I led many ambitious conquests and later revolted against the Holy Roman Emperor Henry III hoping to gain a full autonomy for the Duchy of Bohemia. Despite the initial success in Battle at Brůdek, he could not withstand the second invasion of the imperial army and ultimately had to renounce all of his conquests save for Moravia and recognize Henry III as his sovereign. After Břetislav's death, the infighting among Přemyslids continued – a consequence of seniority inheritance laws. Among the more notable rulers belong (Vratislaus II and Vladislaus) who were awarded lifetime titles of kings by the Holy Roman Emperors for their services.

=== Kingdom of Bohemia ===
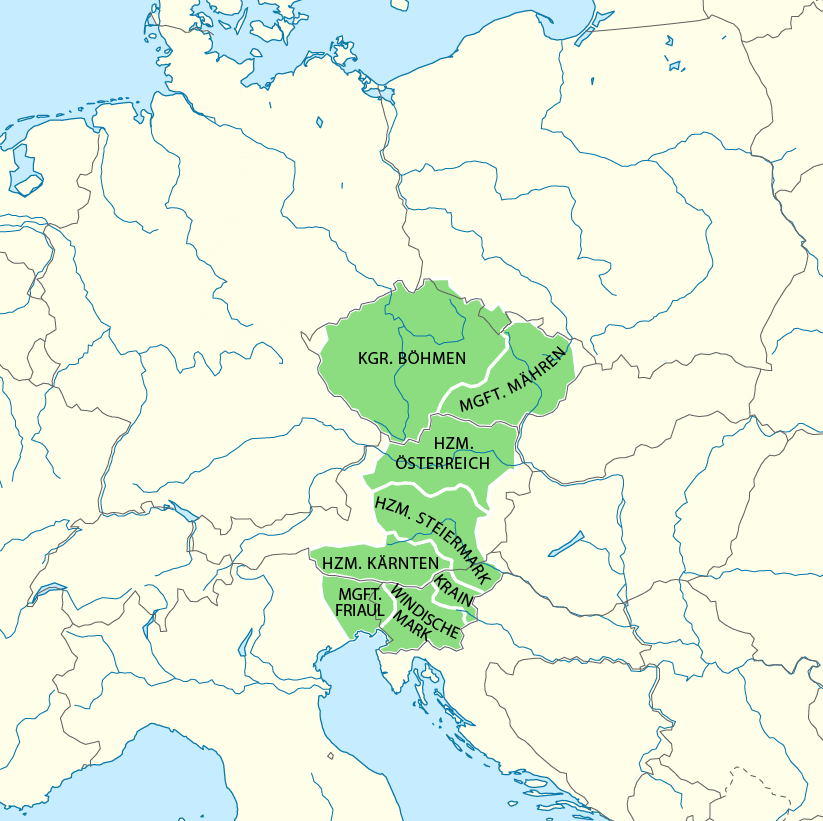
Territories ruled by Ottokar II of Bohemia in 1273

==== Late Přemyslids ====
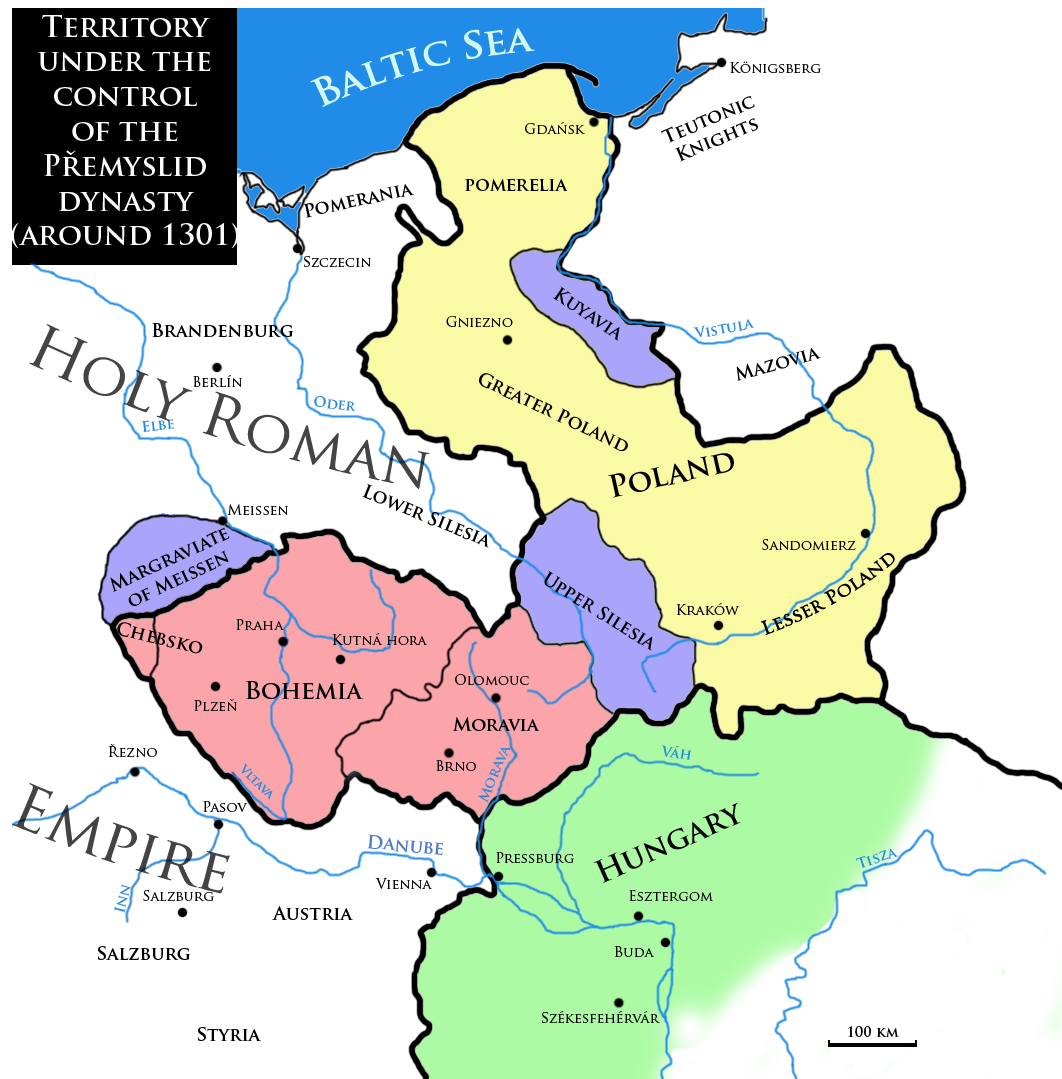
Territory under the control of the Přemyslids, c. 1301

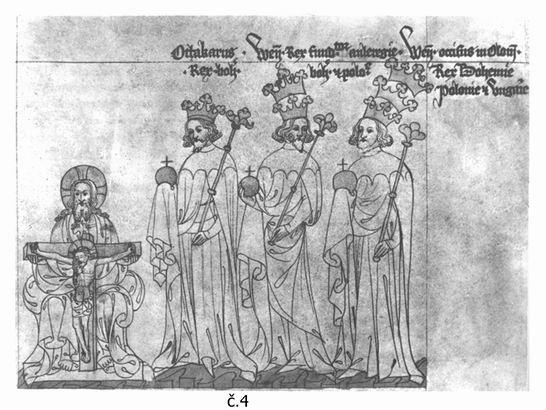
Czech kings Ottokar II, Wenceslaus II and Wenceslaus III from the Přemyslid dynasty

In 1212 Ottokar I was granted a hereditary title of the King of Bohemia by the Holy Roman Emperor Frederick II. Thus began the Kingdom of Bohemia, which lasted de iure until the end of World War I. His reign marked the start of the German eastward colonization, which over time significantly altered the language composition of the Czech Lands. His son Wenceslaus I had to deal with the Mongol invasion of Europe at the start of 1240s. He managed to defend Bohemia, but Moravian lands were heavily plundered. When the Duke of Austria Frederick II died in 1246 without male heirs, Wenceslaus I tried to secure the Austrian lands by marrying his eldest son Vladislaus to Frederick's niece Gertrude. This plan failed because of Vladislaus's premature death in the year after. Wenceslaus I then decided for the invasion of Austria and he was successful. His successor, Ottokar II, continued the expansion of the realm. He gained more territory south of Austria and led two crusades against the pagan Old Prussians. He was hoping to gain the Imperial crown, but lost in the 1273 election to Rudolf of Habsburg, the first in a line of Habsburg emperors. Rudolf of Habsburg demanded that Ottokar II returns all of the lands he had acquired south of Bohemia. Ottokar refused and waged two wars against the emperor, which ended with his death at the battlefield of Marchfeld in 1278.

The crown was passed to his 6-year-old son Wenceslaus II. Otto V, Margrave of Brandenburg ruled as a regent in his stead, later replaced by Záviš of Falkenstein, who married Ottokar II's widow. In 1290, Wenceslaus II had Záviš beheaded for alleged treason and began ruling independently. Year later, Przemysł II, the king of Poland, was murdered and Wenceslaus II gained the Polish crown for himself. At the end of the 13th century, huge deposits of silver were found in Kutná Hora, which allowed him to start issuing vast amounts of silver coins called Prague groschen. In 1301, another neighbouring monarch died – Andrew III of Hungary, the last male member of the Árpád dynasty. Wenceslaus II married his son Wenceslaus III to Andrew III's only daughter and had him crowned in Székesfehérvár as the King of Hungary. Four years later, Wenceslaus II died – only 33 years old – probably of tuberculosis. Wenceslaus III abandoned his claim to the Hungarian throne, seeing that his rule was only nominal. Władysław the Elbow-high challenged Wenceslaus III's rule in Poland and conquered Krakow in 1306. Before Wenceslaus III could start his retaliation campaign, he was murdered in Olomouc by unknown assassins.

==== House of Luxembourg ====
Wenceslaus III was the last male member of the main branch of Přemyslids. The Holy Roman Emperor Henry VII of the House of Luxembourg married his son John to Wenceslaus III's sister Elisabeth and secured for him the Bohemian throne. John of Luxembourg was raised in Paris, did not speak any Czech and was widely unpopular among the Czech nobility. John never stayed long in the Czech lands, he traveled all across Europe and took part in multiple military conflicts. While crusading in Lithuania in 1336, John lost his eyesight due to ophthalmia, which earned him the nickname John the Blind. A year later he took the side of King Philip VI of France in the Hundred Years' War and died in 1346 in the Battle of Crécy. His eldest son, Charles IV succeeded him on the Bohemian throne.

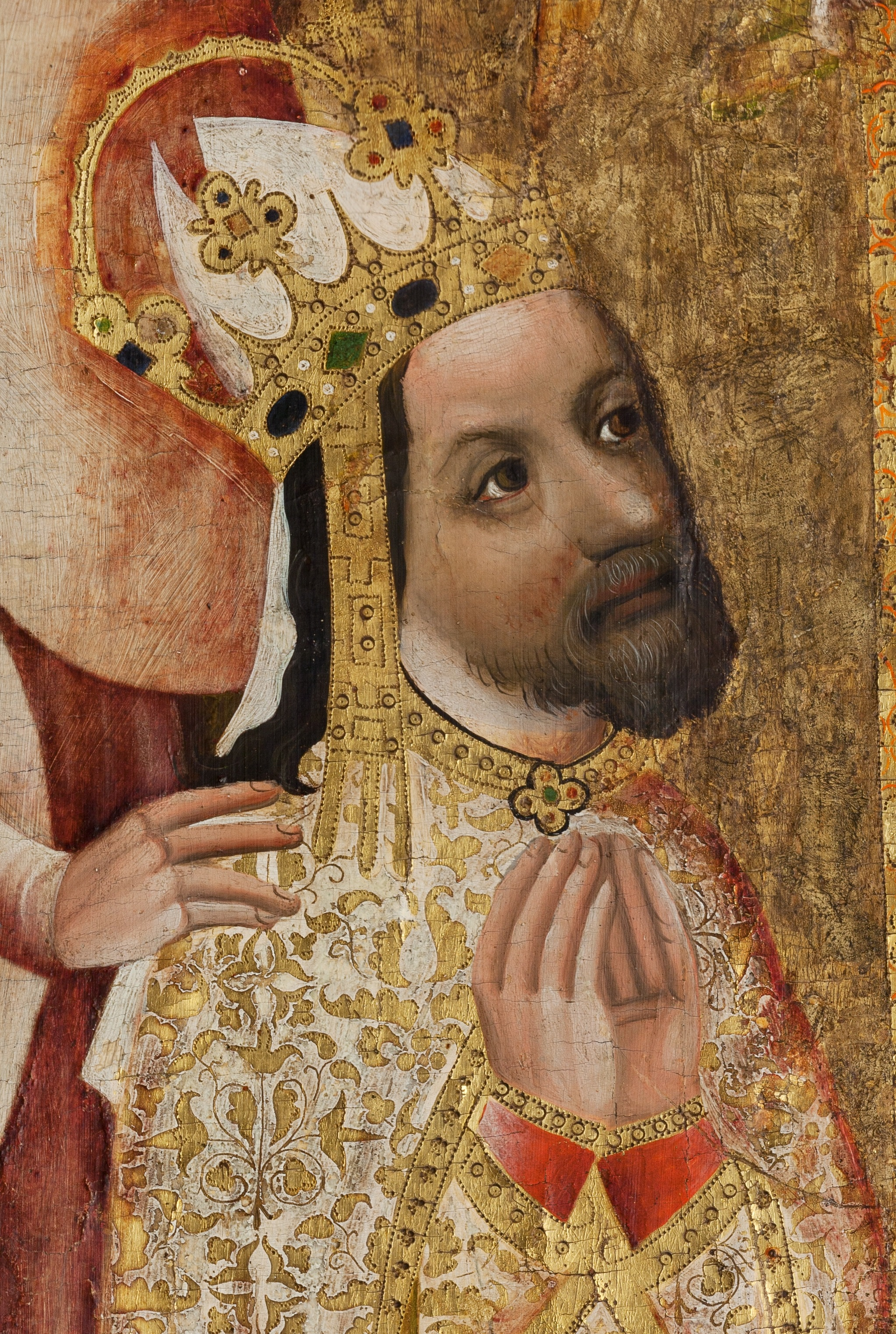
Emperor and King Charles IV. Luxembourg

Earlier in 1346, the Pope Clement VI declared the Emperor Louis IV a heretic and demanded a new Imperial election. Charles IV was the pope's preferred candidate and he was crowned as the King of Romans in November 1346 in Bonn. Charles had been in charge of the administration of Czech Lands since 1333, due to his father's absence and health indisposition. Soon after his coronation as the King of Bohemia and the King of Romans, he settled in Prague and laid the foundations of the New Town expanding the capitol. In 1348 he founded the University of Prague, the first university north of Alps and east of Paris. He also legally established the Lands of the Bohemian Crown (Corona regni Bohemiae in Latin), meaning the core territories no longer belonged to a king or a dynasty but to the Bohemian monarchy (crown) itself.

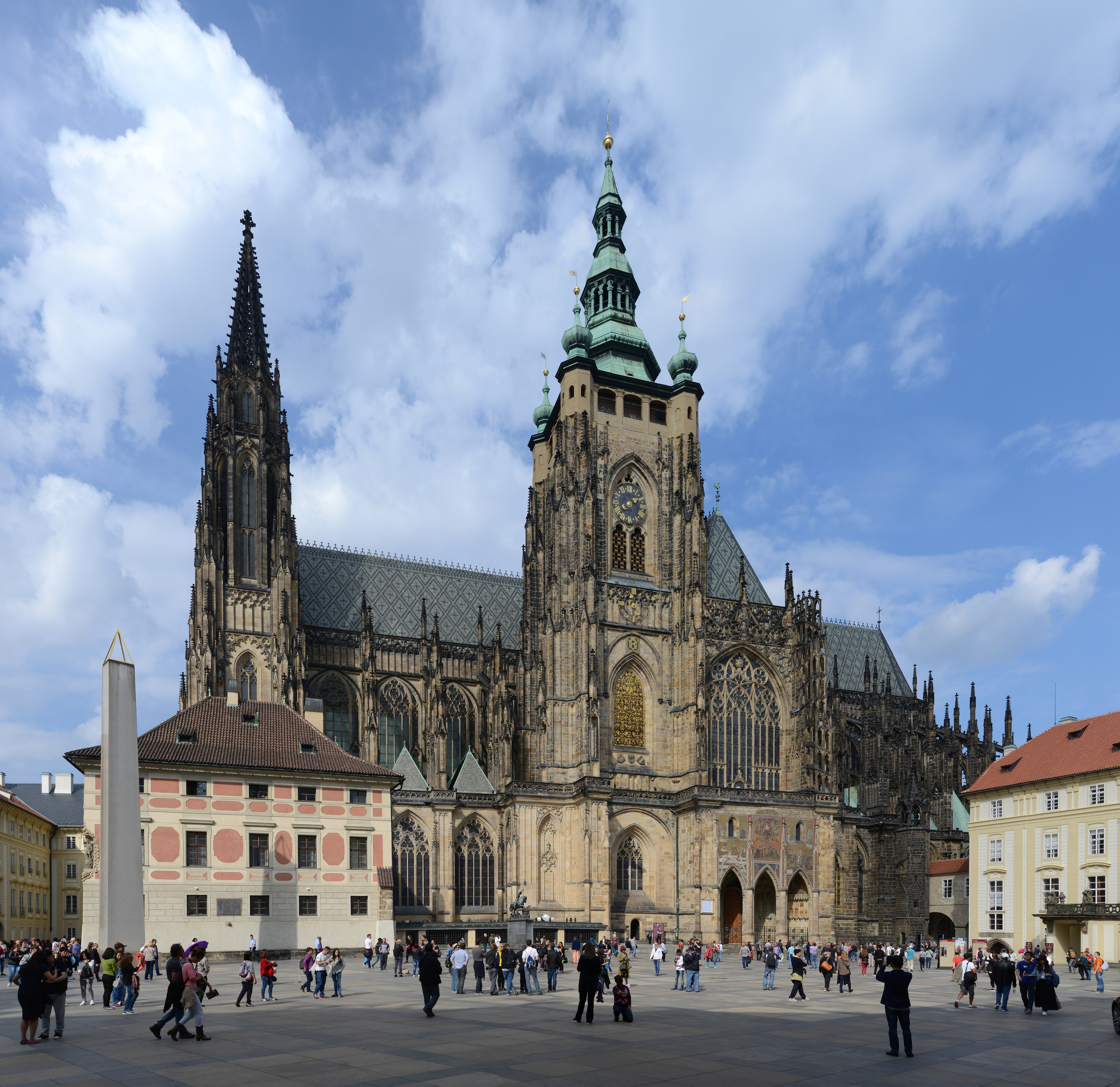
St. Vitus Cathedral in Prague Castle, John of Luxembourg laid the foundation stone in 1344

In 1355, Charles IV travelled to Rome where he was crowned the Emperor of the Holy Roman Empire. He ruled as the Holy Roman Emperor for over 20 years and managed to secure the title of the King of Romans for his eldest son Wenceslaus IV.

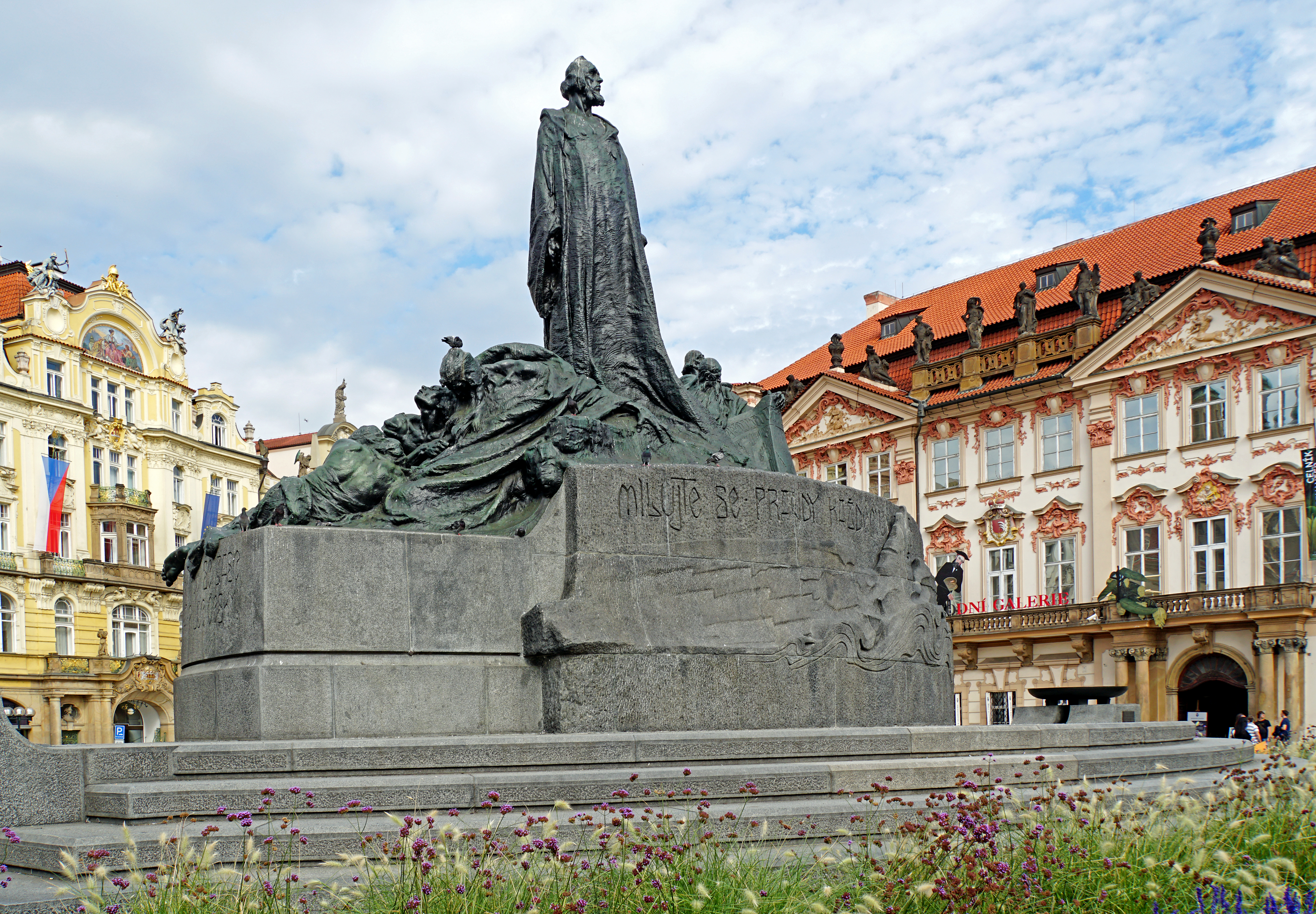
Monument to Master Jan Hus, a religious reformer and philosopher in Prague

Wenceslaus IV did not share the governance abilities of his father. In 1393, the torture and murder John of Nepomuk – vicar-general of the archbishop Jan of Jenštejn – sparked a noble rebellion. He was imprisoned for two years at Králův Dvůr and was only released after an intervention from his younger brother Sigismund, who had become the King of Hungary. In 1400, Wenceslaus IV was deposed as the Holy Roman Emperor, mainly due to his failure to address the Papal Schism. Two years later, Wenceslaus IV was briefly imprisoned again, this time by his brother Sigismund, who looted Moravia. After the death of Rupert – who had replaced Wenceslaus as the King of Romans – Wenceslaus IV competed with his brother Sigismund and his cousin Jobst of Moravia for the title of the King of Romans. He ultimately surrendered the title to Sigismund in exchange for keeping Bohemia. In 1414, Sigismund called the Council of Constance, which finally resolved the Papal Schism. It also condemned the teaching of Jan Hus, rector of the University of Prague and a popular church reformist. After Jan Hus refused to retract his teachings, he was burnt alive at stake, which prompted the Hussite Wars. The religious military conflicts stopped in 1434 with the battle Battle of Lipany, but the religious tensions continued on. Although Sigismund became the titular King of Bohemia after Wenceslaus IV's death in 1419, it was not until 1436 that he was recognized by the Czech Estates and he died a year after.

==== House of Habsburg ====
After Sigismunds's death the title of the King of Bohemia went to his son-in-law Albert from the House of Habsburg, who died shortly after. The claim to the Lands of the Bohemian Crown was passed to his unborn son Ladislaus, who gained the nickname Posthumous. He was raised at the court of his distant relative Emperor Frederick III. Although he was crowned the King of Bohemia in 1453, his regent George of Poděbrady continued to effectively rule Bohemia in his stead. Ladislaus died in Prague after fleeing a rebellion in Hungary, aged only seventeen. Many of his contemporaries suspected he was poisoned, but modern examinations of his skeleton proved he died of acute leukemia. With his death the Albertinian Line of the House of Habsburg ended.

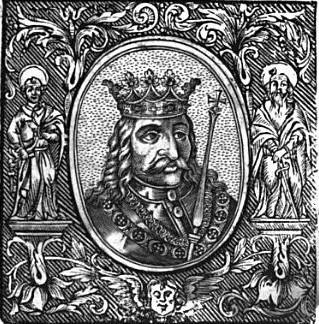
King George of Podebrady, one of the first promoters of united Europe

==== House of Poděbrady ====
In 1458, the estates of Bohemia elected George of Poděbrady as the new King of Bohemia. He had a difficult role trying to maintain a fragile peace between the Catholic side and the Hussite side, for which he earned the nickname King of two peoples. Despite his efforts, he ultimately did not succeed and in 1465, the catholic nobles formed the Unity of Green Mountain and challenged his rule. A year after, he was excommunicated by the new Pope Paul II, which gave a justification for the Hungarian king Matthias Corvinus to invade the Czech Lands and start the Bohemian–Hungarian War.

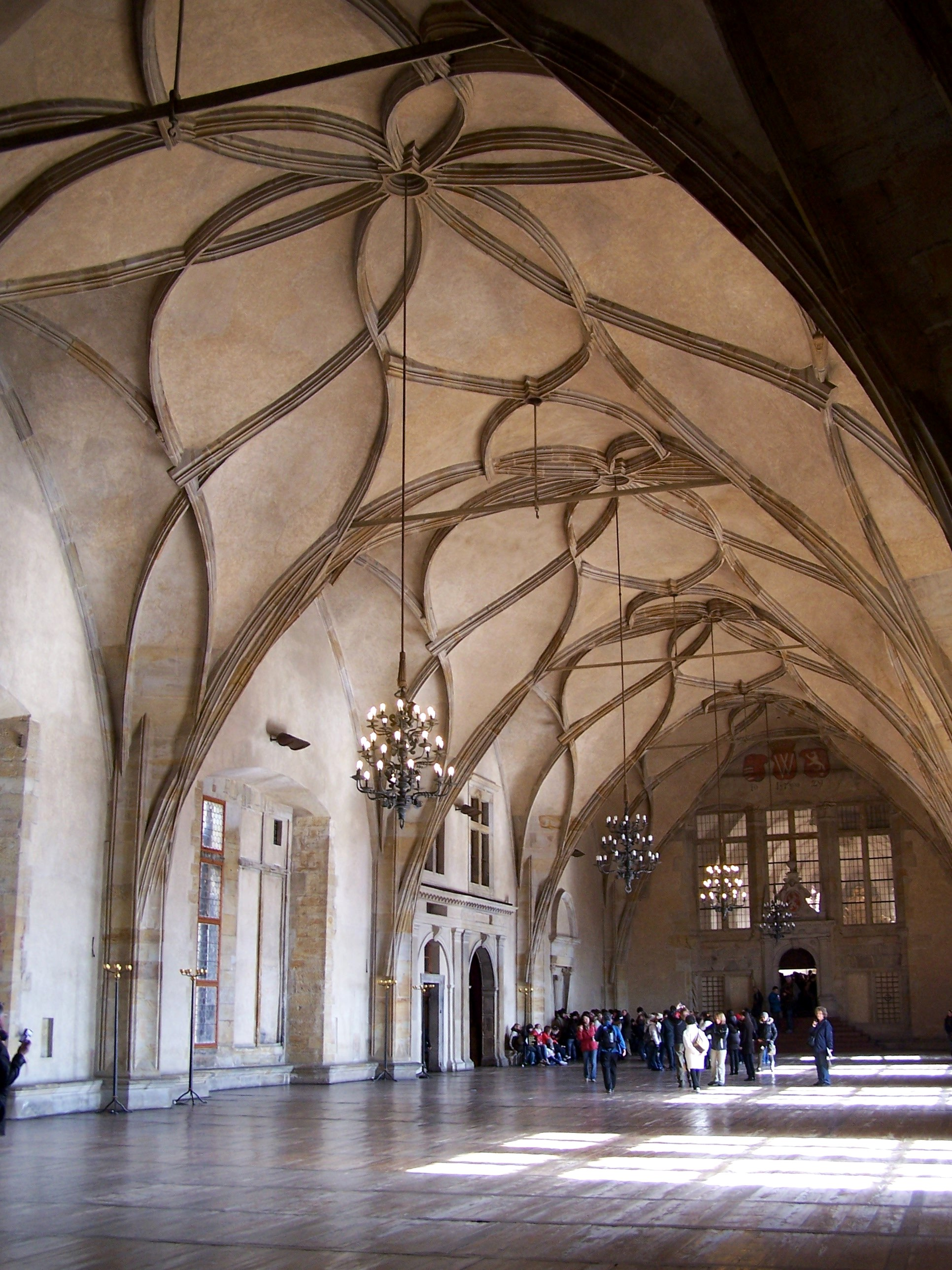
Vladislaus Hall at the Prague Castle, built from 1490 to 1502 by Benedikt Rejt

==== House of Jagiellon ====
After King George's death, the war was continued by Vladislaus II from the House of Jagiellon, who was offered the throne of Bohemia by George of Poděbrady himself. After ten years of fighting, the Bohemian-Hungarian War finally ended by signing of the Peace of Olomouc in 1479, in which Moravia, Silesia and Lusatia were ceded to Matthias Corvinus for the rest of his life and both monarchs were allowed to use the title of King of Bohemia. In 1485, Vladislaus II confirmed right of all Bohemian noblemen and commoners to freely adhere either to Hussitism or Catholicism in the Peace of Kutná Hora. After Matthias Corvinus died in 1490, Vladislaus II was elected the King of Hungary and gained all the territories he ceded 30 years earlier. From then on he ruled from Buda. Although Vladislaus II was married three times, he only had two children late in his life: son Louis and daughter Anne. Vladislaus II's two children married two grandchildren of the Holy Roman Emperor Maximilian I, the children of his only son Philip, as a result of negotiations at the First Congress of Vienna, tying the House of Jagiellon and the House of Habsburg together.

A year after that, in 1516, Vladislaus II died and his ten-year-old son Louis II became the king of both Hungary and Bohemia. In 1521 he refused to pay the agreed annual tribute to the new Ottoman sultan, Süleyman I and executed his ambassadors. War ensued, Belgrade fell to Ottoman hands the same year. In 1526, Louis II led his forces against Suleiman I in the Battle of Mohács, which ended with a decisive defeat of the Hungarian army and Louis II drowned during his attempted retreat. He left no heirs and so the Lands of the Bohemian Crown were inherited by his brother-in-law Ferdinand I from the House of Habsburg, as was agreed during the First Congress of Vienna.

== Part of Habsburg Monarchy ==
=== Protestantism ===
The extent of the Protestant Reformation (1545–1620)

After the Battle of Mohács, the Ottomans were unsuccessful in their Siege of Vienna in 1529 and Ferdinand I managed to sign the Treaty of Constantinopole, postponing the Ottoman expansion attempts. Ferdinand and his brother Charles V – who was the Holy Roman Emperor at the same time – had to deal with not only the Ottoman threat, but also with the Schmalkaldic League which formed in 1531 to advance the interests of Lutheran states in the Holy Roman Empire. Largely Protestant Czech nobility had a favorable view of the Schmalkaldic League's goals and so when in 1546 Ferdinand I ordered the Czech estates to raise their army and march against the Protestant Electorate of Saxony as part of the Schmalkaldic War, they did so very reluctantly. The next year the Czech estates refused to gather an army again and rebelled, for which they were punished after the Schmalkaldic League decisively lost the Battle of Mühlberg. As a result, Ferdinand I managed to strengthen his position in the Land of the Bohemian Crown, limit city privileges and begin the process of recatholicization by inviting the Jesuit Order to Prague in 1556.

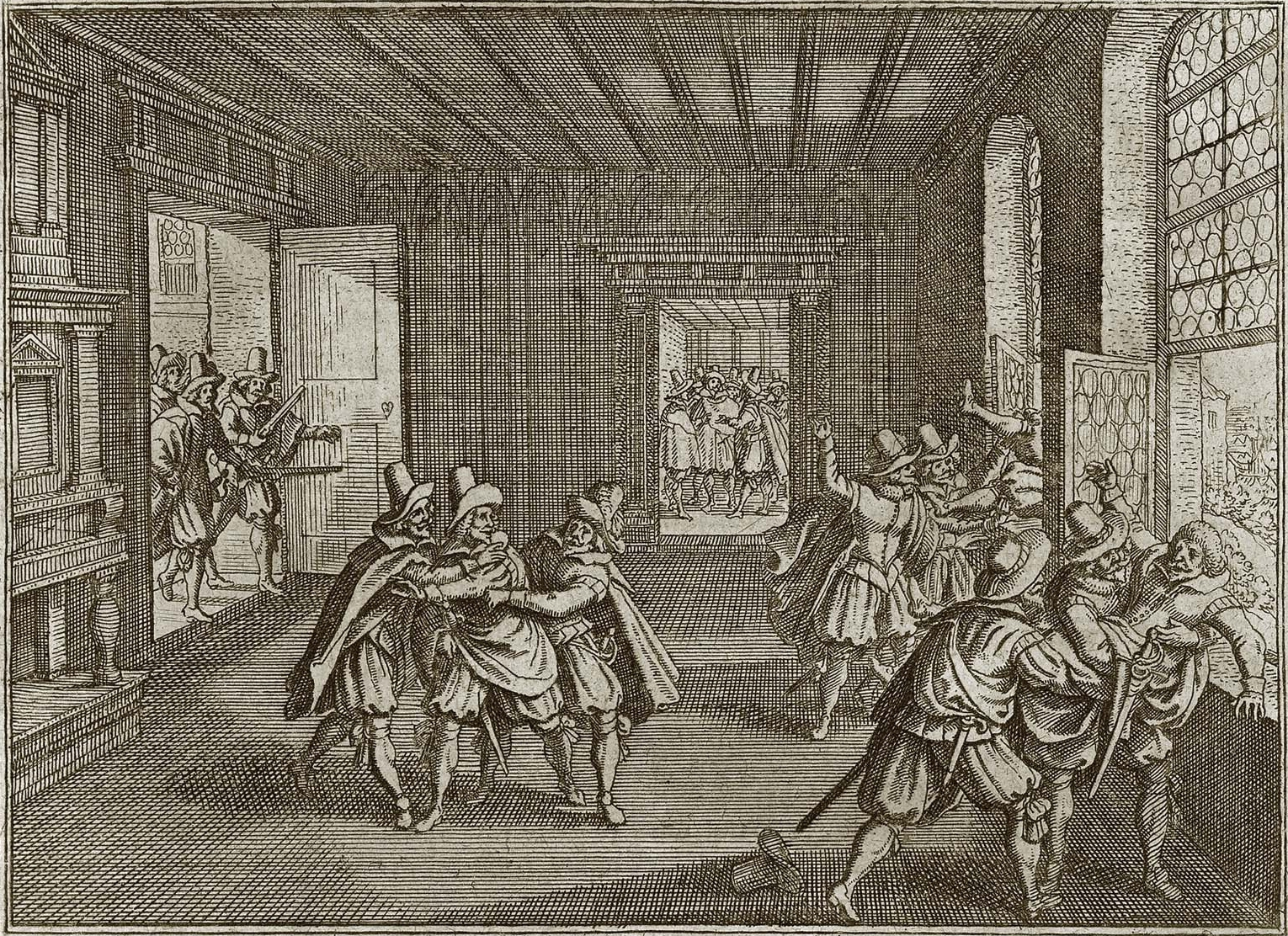
Copper engraving of the Second Defenestration of Prague from Theatrum Europaeum by Matthäus Merian.

From 1599 to 1711, Moravia (a Land of the Bohemian Crown) was frequently subjected to raids by the Ottoman Empire and its vassals (especially the Tatars and Transylvania). Overall, hundreds of thousands were enslaved whilst tens of thousands were killed.

Maximilian II succeeded Ferdinand I in 1562 and – like his father – ruled from Vienna. He approved Czech Confession (Confessio Bohemica in Latin) – a new document confirming religious freedoms – replacing the older Compacts of Basel, which did not take non-Utraquist Protestants into account. He also showed his religious tolerance by reaffirming the Statuta Judaeorum – a document providing legal protection for the Jews in the Lands of the Bohemian Crown. His son Rudolf II succeeded him in 1576 and in 1583 he moved the royal court to Prague. Thanks to Rudolf's patronage of art, Prague became a major cultural hub of Europe during his reign. He was a reclusive ruler who preferred his hobbies to the daily affairs of the state. In 1605 Rudolf II was forced by his other family members to cede the rule of Hungary to his younger brother Archduke Matthias following the Bocskai Uprising after the Long Turkish War. The differences of opinions between the two brothers ultimately resulted in Rudolf's imprisonment at the Prague Castle and all effective power was given into the hands of Matthias. After Rudolf II's death in 1612 the royal court moved back to Vienna. Matthias did not have any children – same as his brother Rudolf – and he died six years later, aged 62.

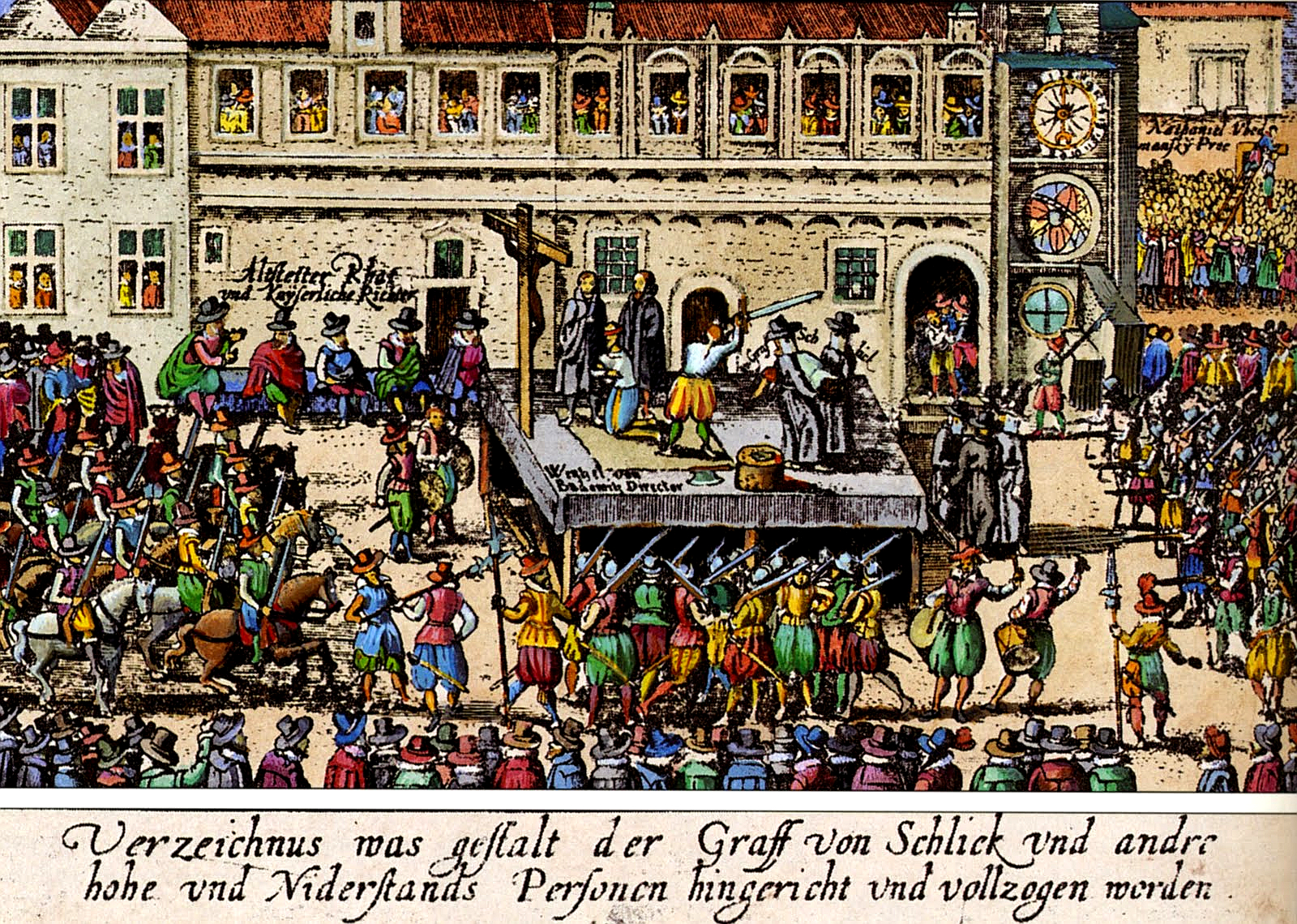
Beheading of 27 Bohemian nobles at the Old Town Square in Prague, 1621 (contemporary illustration)

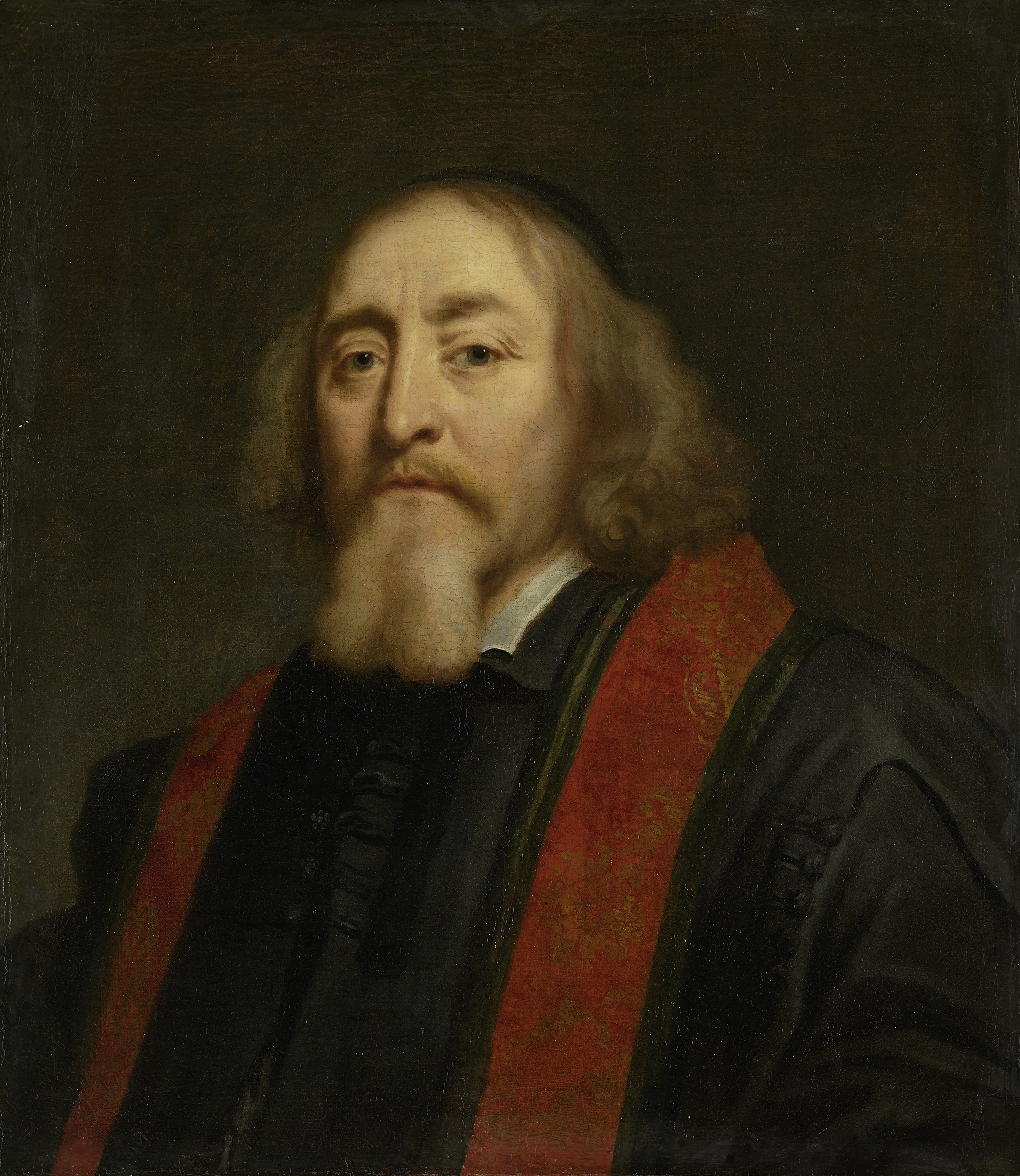
John Amos Comenius (1592–1670), Czech philosopher and school reformer

He was succeeded by his cousin Ferdinand II, Archduke of Austria. The Diets of Bohemia confirmed Ferdinand's position as Matthias' successor only after he had promised to respect the Letter of Majesty – a document granting religious freedoms, signed by Rudolf II. eight years earlier. Ferdinand II did not share the religious benevolence of his predecessors. A year after he was crowned, he prohibited the construction of Protestant ecclesial buildings on royal land. That led to protests among the Protestant nobility – who saw it as a violation of the Letter of Majesty – and the Second Defenestration of Prague in 1618, which sparked the conflict that would become the Thirty Years' War. The revolting Bohemian estates then chose Frederick V of Palatinate as their new king and gathered an army in preparation of war. They were joined by Lutheran nobility in Austria. Ferdinand II asked his Spanish relative Philip III for help. Spanish army in the Netherlands made sure forces of Protestant Union could not join the revolt happening in the Lands of the Bohemian Crown and in Austria. After dealing with the Austrian rebels, Ferdinand II decisively defeated Frederick V at the Battle of White Mountain, near Prague. Widespread confiscation of property followed, which was then sold to loyal nobles, often of foreign origin. Ferdinand II also had the 27 leaders of the revolt publicly beheaded and strengthened the royal power over the estates. The Lands of the Bohemian Crown and especially Silesia were some of the territories that were hit the hardest by the devastating Thirty Years' War. The war continued even after Ferdinand II's death during the reign of Ferdinand III.

=== Absolutism and National Revival ===
==== Late Habsburgs ====
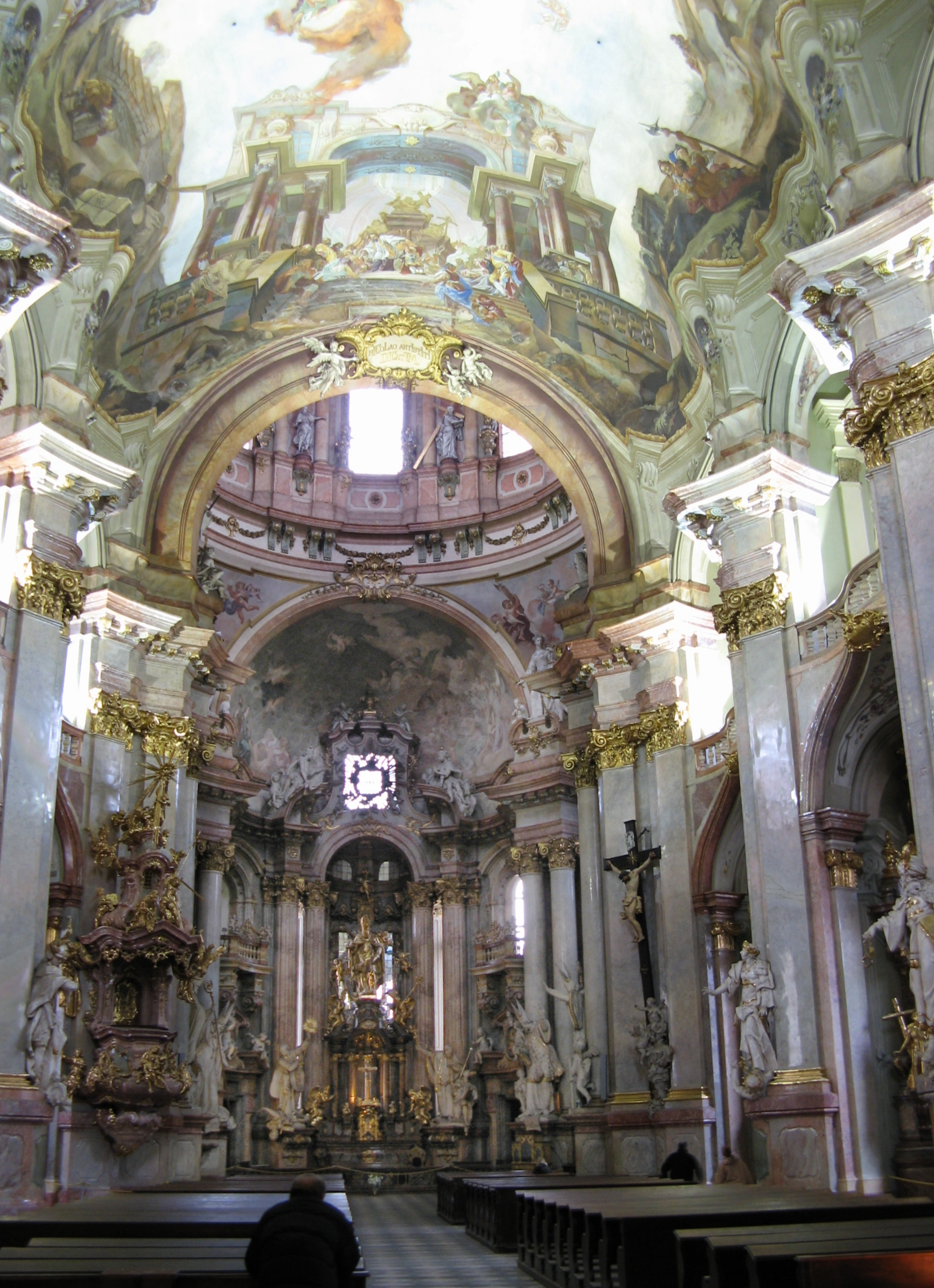
Baroque St. Nicholas Church in Malá Strana, built between 1704 and 1755

In 1648, the Thirty Years' War finally ended with the Peace of Westphalia. Ferdinand III continued the recatholicization and centralization policies of his father. After his death in 1657, he was succeeded by his only surviving son Leopold I. During the fourth Austro-Turkish War in 1663 the Turkish army invaded Moravia before being stopped in the Battle of Saint Gotthard. Leopold continued waging wars with Ottomans and France throughout his long rule. He increased corvée to three days a week which caused the Peasant Revolt of 1680. The infamous Losiny Estate Witch Trials took place between 1678 and 1696 resulting in almost 100 dead. More protests against the increased corvée occurred, but all in vain. In 1705, Leopold I's rule ended and his son Joseph I succeeded him. Joseph I planned to enact many administrative reforms, most of which he did not get the chance to finish, due to his premature death of smallpox. One year before his death he issued letters patent ordering that all Romani people in the Lands of the Bohemian Crown had one of their ears cut off. If they returned after being expelled, all Romani men were to be hanged without a trial. Similar letters patents were published in other territories under his rule and led to mass killings of Romani people. After Joseph I's premature death in 1711, the Austrian throne went to his younger brother Charles VI.

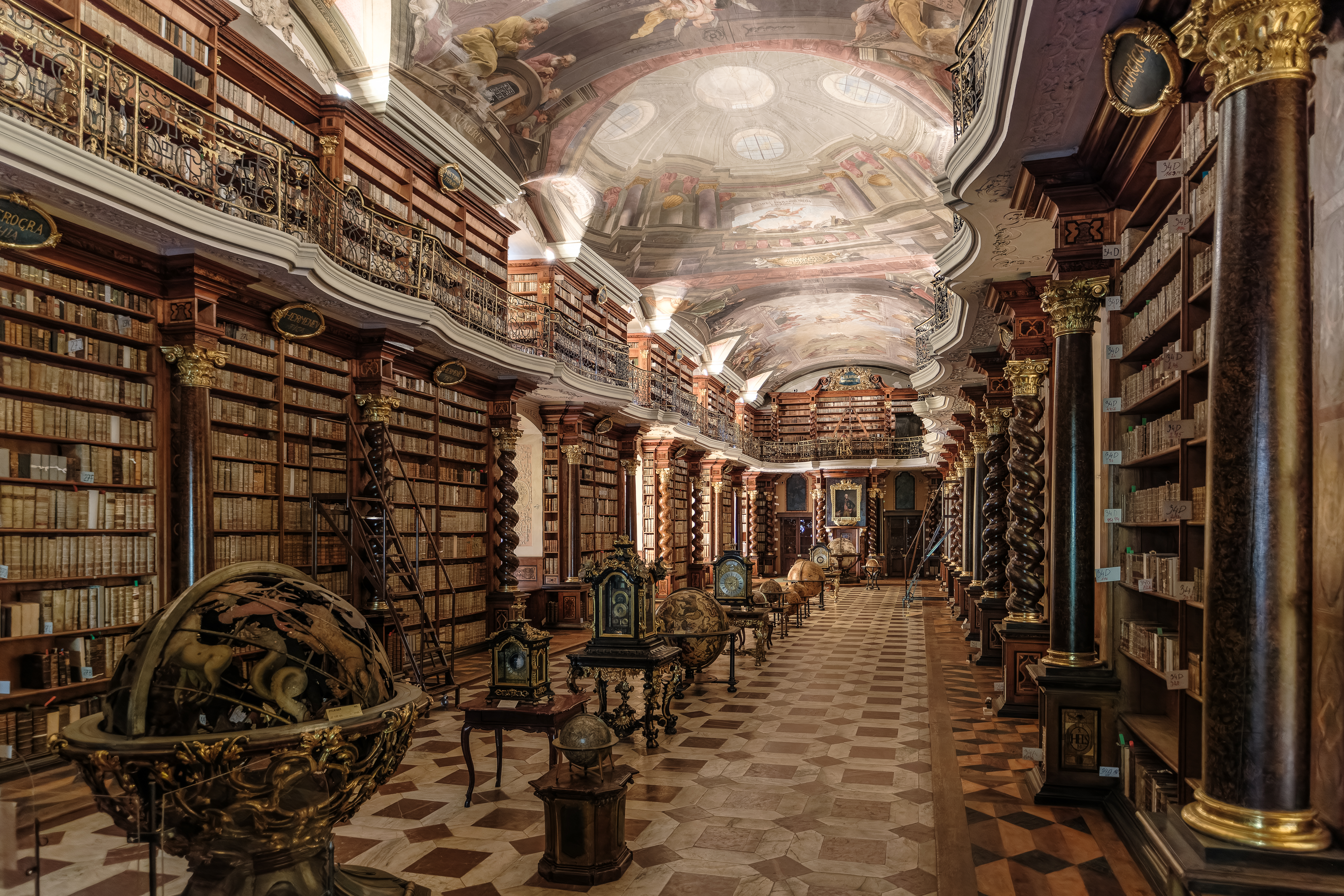
Library of Clementinum, a former Jesuit College, built in 1722

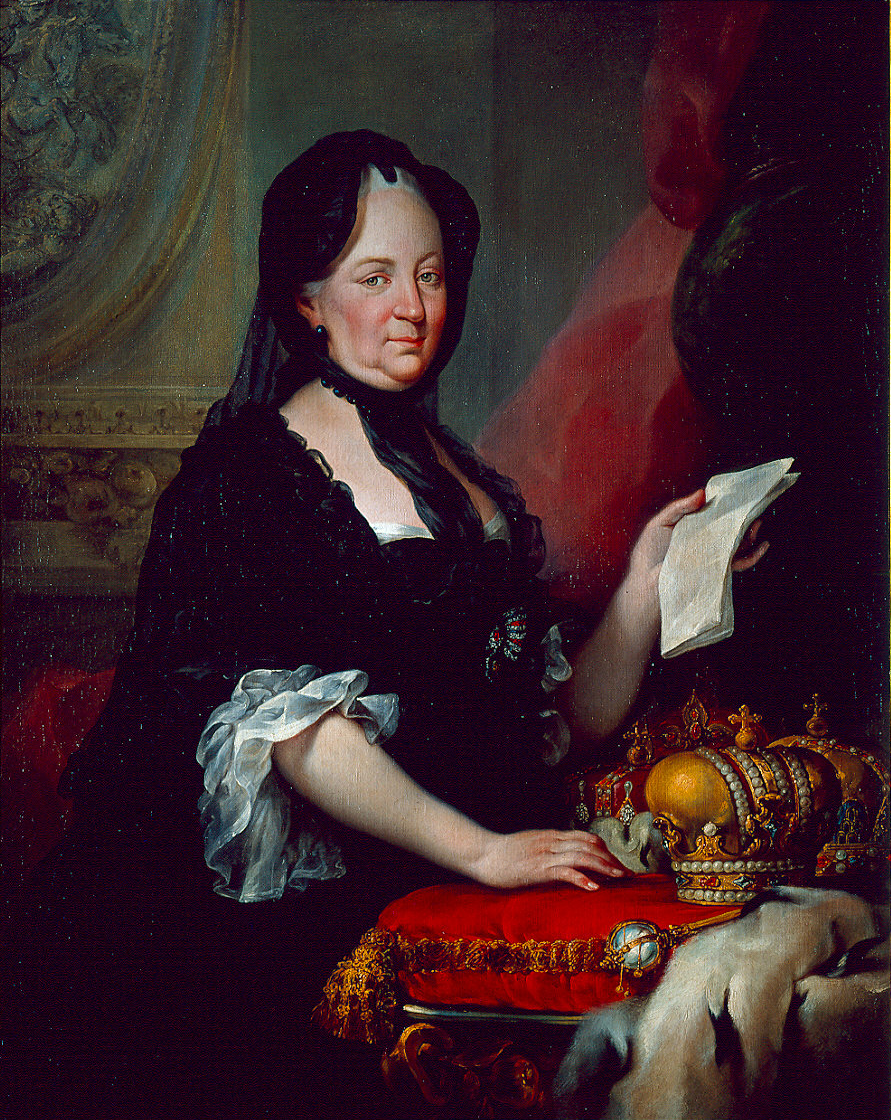
Empress Maria Theresa (reignet 1740–1780)

Charles VI had no male heirs and with the Pragmatic Sanction of 1713 he ensured that all the titles held by him could be inherited by a woman. Charles VI sought the other European powers' approval, which he gained in exchange for various concessions. Regardless, after her father's death, Maria Theresa had to defend her inheritance from the coalition of Prussia, Bavaria, France, Spain, Saxony and Poland in the War of Austrian Succession, which broke out mere weeks after her coronation in 1740. She ultimately managed to defend her title, but paid for it with the loss of Silesia, which became a part of Prussia. That was the ended the unity of the Lands of the Bohemian Crown. In 1757 during the Seven Years' War, the Prussians invaded Bohemia again and laid siege to Prague, but subsequently lost the Battle of Kolín and were repelled. Maria Theresa was not able to regain Silesia and the war ended in a draw. She tried to follow the ideas of Enlightenment, she established compulsory secular primary schools, but also state censorship of books that were deemed to be against the Catholic religion. Because of her marriage to Francis Stephen of Lorraine, all of her children were considered to be members of a new joint House of Habsburg-Lorraine.

==== House of Habsburg–Lorraine ====
After the death of Maria Theresa's husband in 1765, her son Joseph II started to rule with her as a co-ruler and since 1780 as the sole ruler. He enforced many reforms, among the most notable are the abolition of serfdom, Patent of Toleration expanding religious freedom and the dissolution of all monastic orders not involved in education, healthcare or science. As part of his centralization efforts, he also pressed for the expansion of German language to all territories under his rule. Both of his wives died relatively young of smallpox and because he had no sons, he was succeeded by his younger brother Leopold II. Although Leopold II only ruled for two years, he spent several weeks in Prague in 1791 and he let himself be crowned the King of Bohemia. The first Czech Industrial Exhibition was prepared in honor of his visit in Clementinum and the Czech Estates commissioned an opera from Mozart for the occasion. Leopold II was succeeded by Francis I, the first-born of his 12 sons.

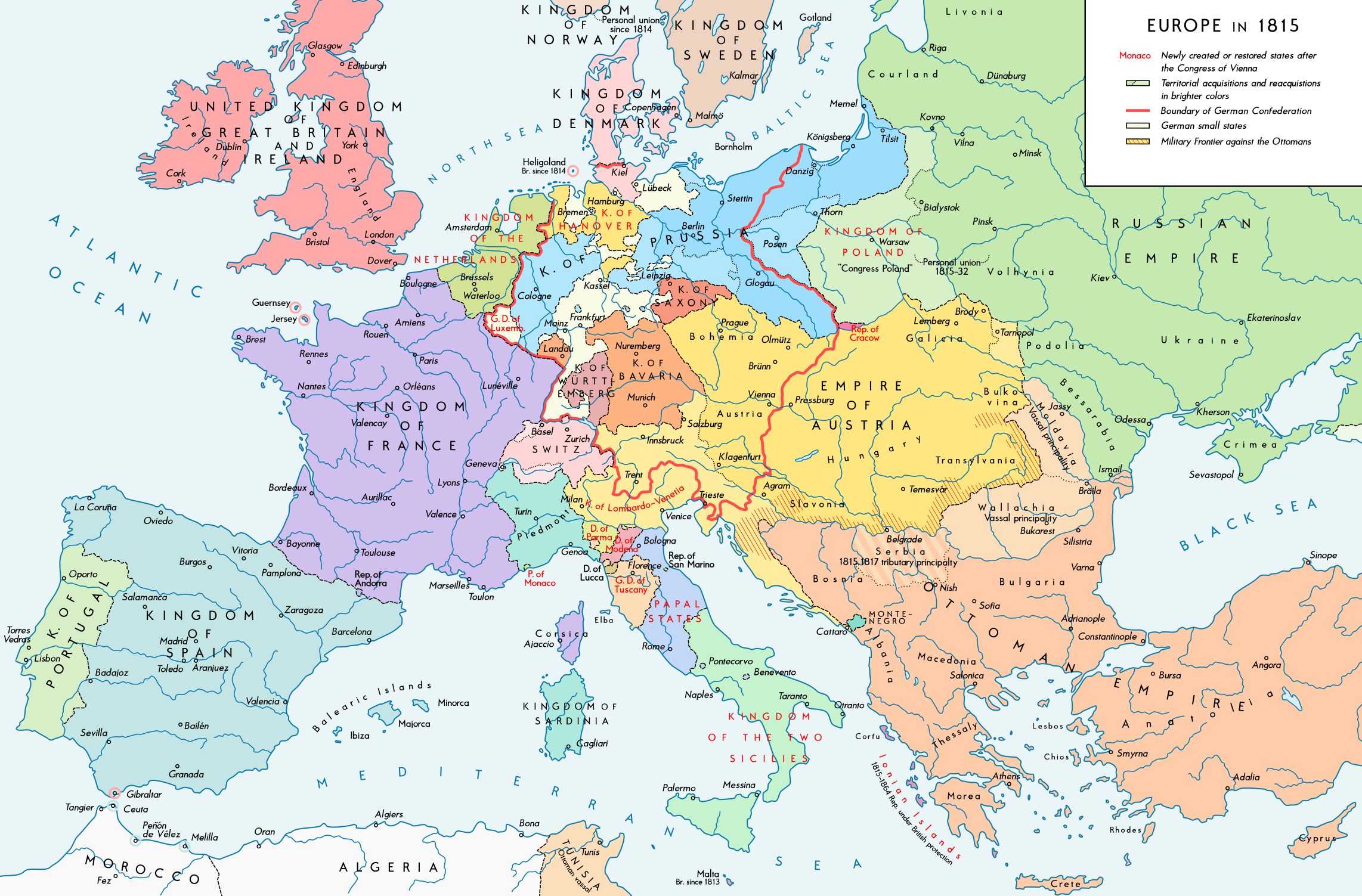
Europe after the Congress of Vienna in 1815

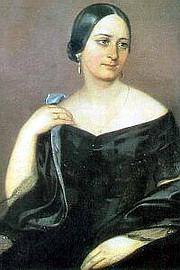
Writer Božena Němcová

In 1805, Napoleon's army attacked Austria and defeated the Austrian and Russian army in the decisive Battle of Austerlitz in south Moravia. In the Peace of Pressburg, Francis I lost many of his territories and soon after, the Holy Roman Empire dissolved, replaced by the Confederation of the Rhine. Following the end of Napoleonic Wars, the Congress of Vienna reinstated the Austrian Empire as one of the Great Powers of Europe in 1815. Francis I was a proponent of conservatism and his policies suppressed all of the emerging liberal and nationalist movements in his Empire. He was the first of Austrian monarchs to widely utilize the secret police and he increased censorship. His son Ferdinand I became the Austrian Emperor after him. Because of his frequent seizures, he was not capable of ruling and the actual executive power was held by the Regent's Council. In 1836, one year after his succession, he was crowned the King of Bohemia under the name of Ferdinand V.

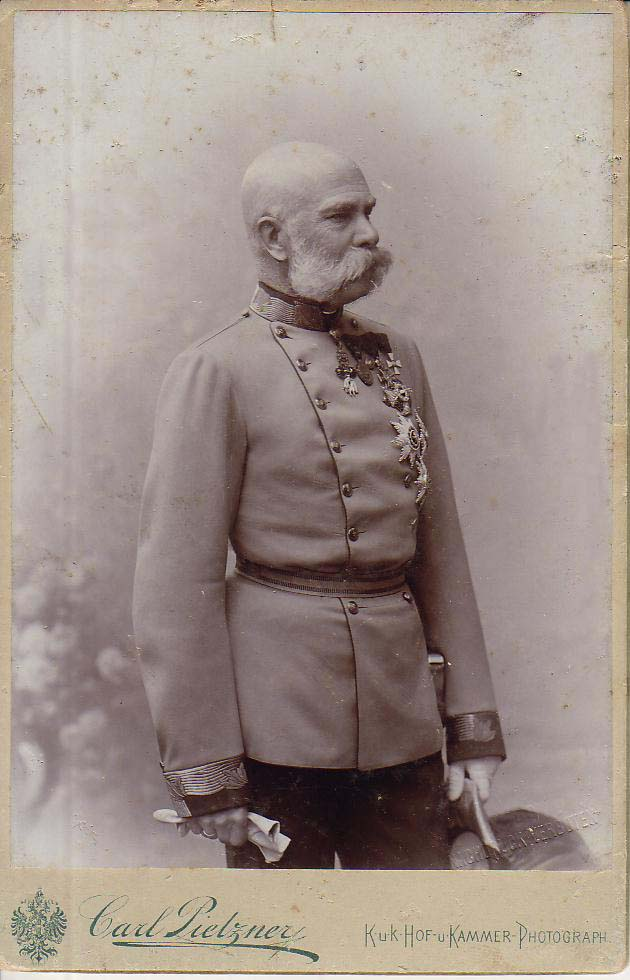
Emperor Francis Joseph I. (reigned 1848–1916)

Throughout the 19th century, the nationalist tendencies and movements in the Czech lands known as the Czech National Revival slowly grew, led by activists such as linguists Josef Dobrovský and Josef Jungmann, historian and politician František Palacký or writer Božena Němcová and journalist Karel Havlíček Borovský. The efforts of the Czech National Revival first peaked during the revolutions of 1848. Ferdinand I was forced to abdicate and his successor was his young nephew Francis Joseph I. When he – after losing the war with Italy in 1859 – also lost the war with Prussia in 1866, the Hungarian representatives forced Francis Joseph I to end his absolutist rule over Hungary in the Austro-Hungarian Compromise of 1867. The Czech representatives who hoped for a similar increase in autonomy were left out and the Czech lands remained firmly under the control of Austria.

==== Austria-Hungary ====
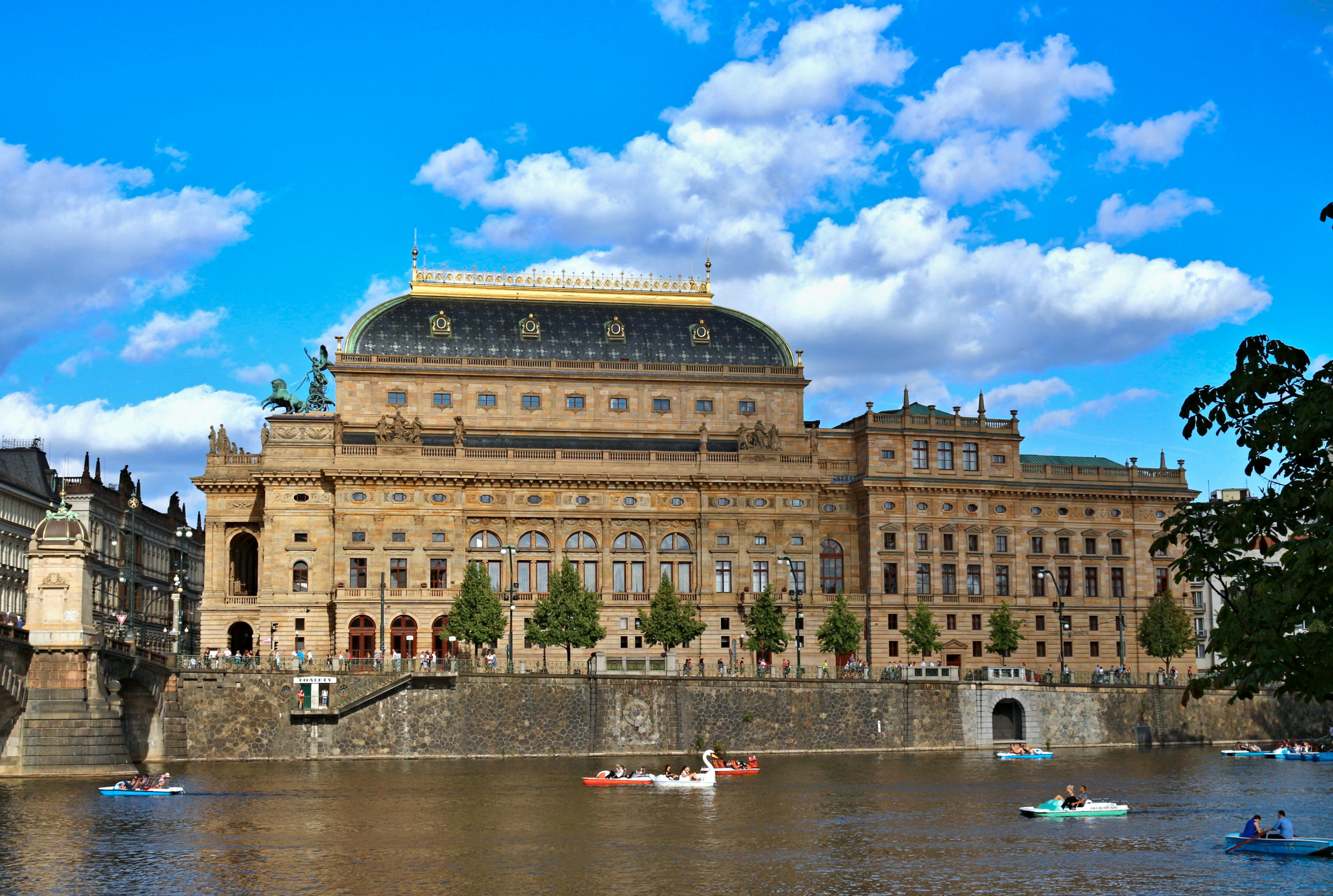
The National Theater from 1881

The newly formed Real union of Austria-Hungary lasted for the next half-century. The policies suppressing the National Revival in the Czech lands under the Austrian government continued, as well as the suppression of the Slovak National Revival under the Hungarian government. The end of the 19th century was also a time of demographic boom and a rapid urbanization. Population in centers of industry doubled or tripled within a few decades. At the start of the 20th century, Austria's unilateral annexation of Bosnia in 1908 caused the Bosnian Crisis and prompted the eventual assassination of Archduke Franz Ferdinand of Austria, sparking the World War I in 1914. Many of the Czech nationalists saw the war as an opportunity for gaining full independence from Austria-Hungary. Desertion among the Czech conscripts was commonplace and Czechoslovak Legions were formed to fight for the side of Entente Powers. In the Cleveland Agreement of 1915, the Czech and Slovak representatives declared their goal of creating a common state, based on the right of a people to self-determination. When World War I ended in 1918, the Kingdom of Bohemia officially ceased to exist and a new democratic republic of Czechoslovakia took its place.

== Modern times ==
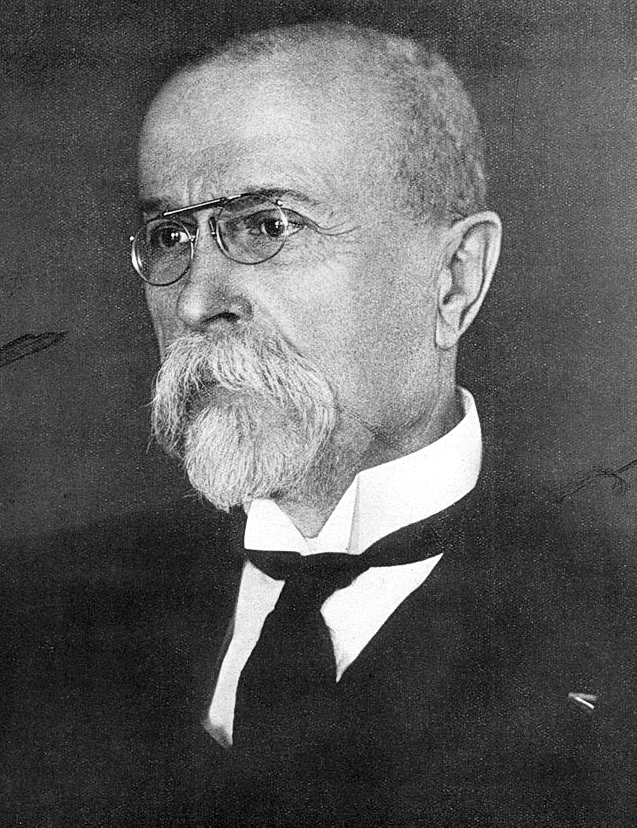
Tomas Garrigue Masaryk, philosopher, Czechoslovak president in the years 1918–1935

=== Czechoslovakia ===
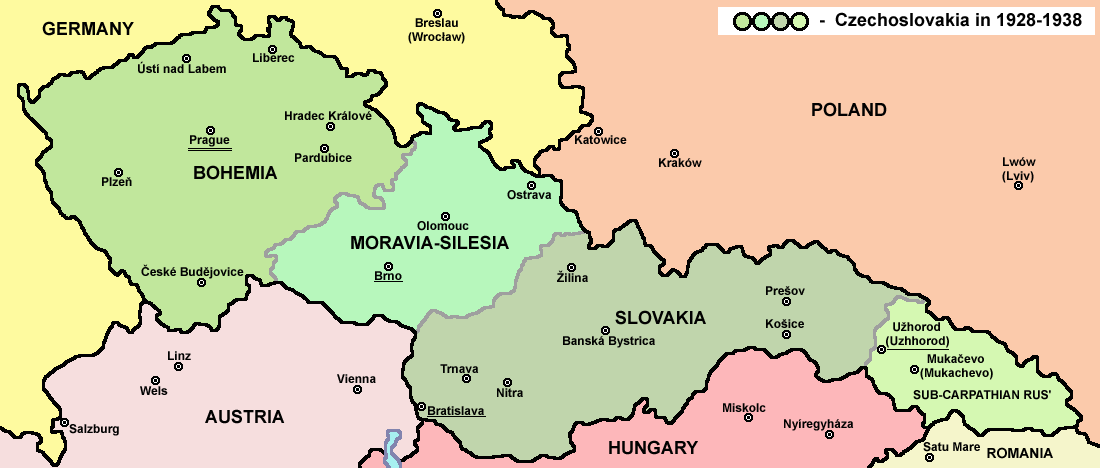
The First Czechoslovak Republic (1918–1938)

The republic of Czechoslovakia was declared in October 1918. It was a democratic presidential republic. In 1920, its defined territory was not inhabited only by Czechs and Slovaks, it contained significant populations of other nationalities: Germans (22.95%), Hungarians (5.47%) and Ruthenians (3.39%). The Great Depression starting at the end of the 1920s together with the rise of the National Socialist Party in neighbouring Germany during the 1930s caused increasing tensions between the different nationalist groups in Czechoslovakia. In foreign relations the newly established republic relied heavily on its western allies of Great Britain and France. That proved to be a mistake as in 1938, both allied countries agreed to Hitler's demands and co-signed the Munich Treaty, stripping the Czechoslovakia of its borderlands, leaving it indefensible.

=== German protectorate ===
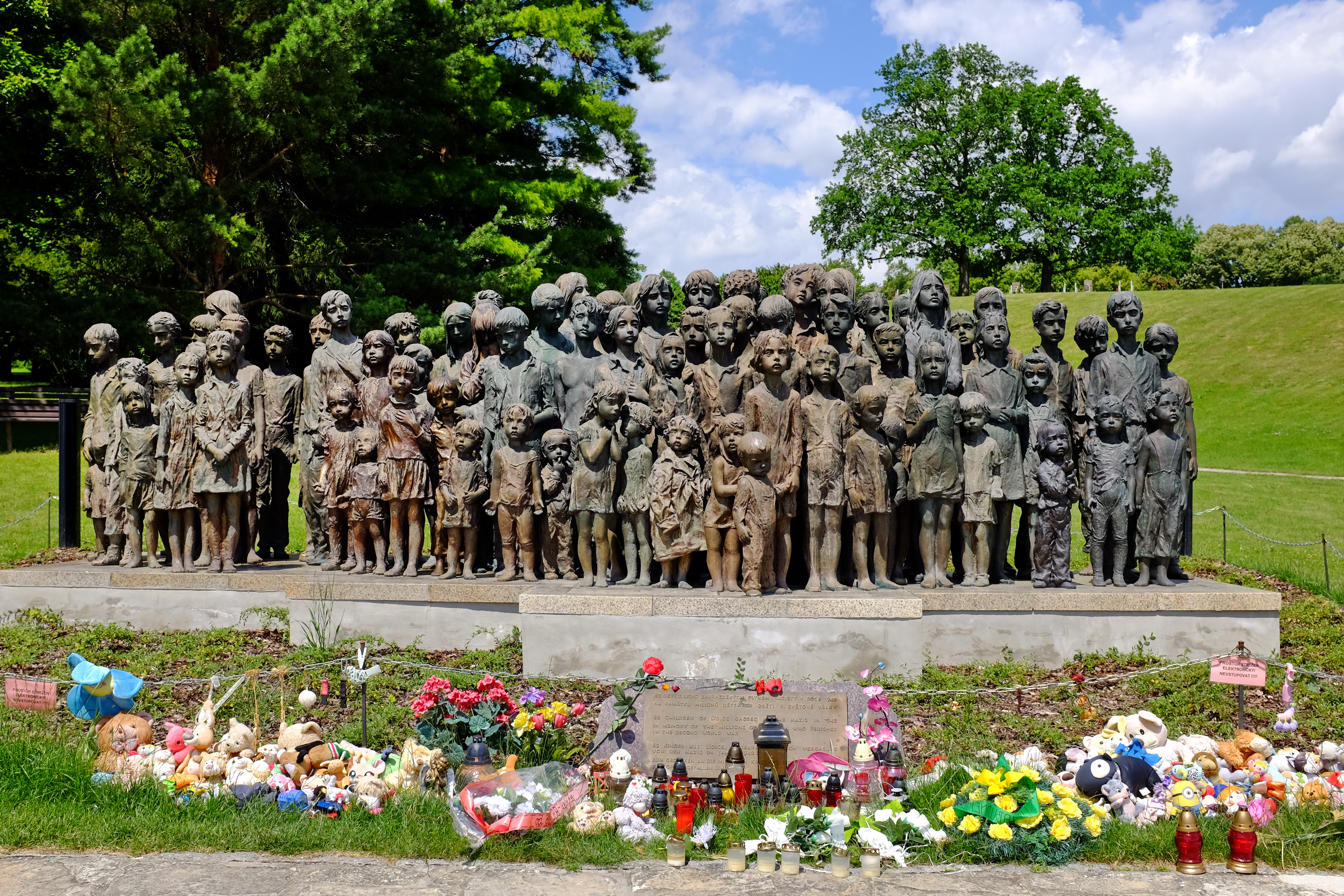
Monument to the village of Lidice murdered by the Nazis

After giving up Sudetenland, the Second Czechoslovak Republic lasted only half-a-year before its full dismemberment before the start of World War II. The Slovak Republic declared its independence from Czechoslovakia and became Germany's client state, while two days later the German Protectorate of Bohemia and Moravia was proclaimed. During World War II – given the high level of industrialization of pre-war Czechoslovakia – the Protectorate of Bohemia and Moravia served as a major hub of military production for Germany. The oppression of ethnic Czechs increased after the assassination of Reinhard Heydrich by members of the Czech resistance in 1942. After Germany's defeat in 1945, the vast majority of ethnic Germans were forcefully deported from Czechoslovakia.

=== Rule of the Communist Party ===
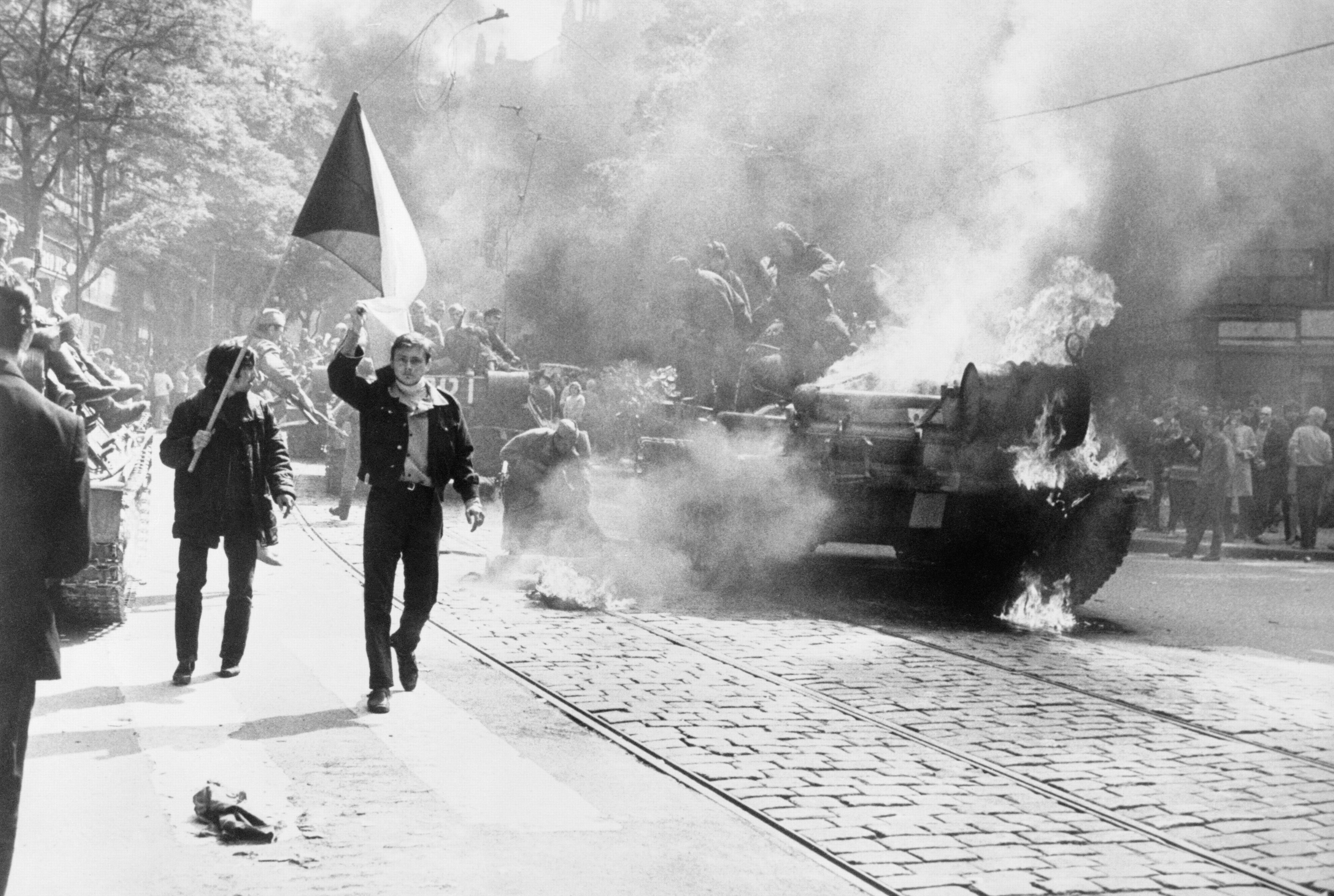
Russian occupation in 1968

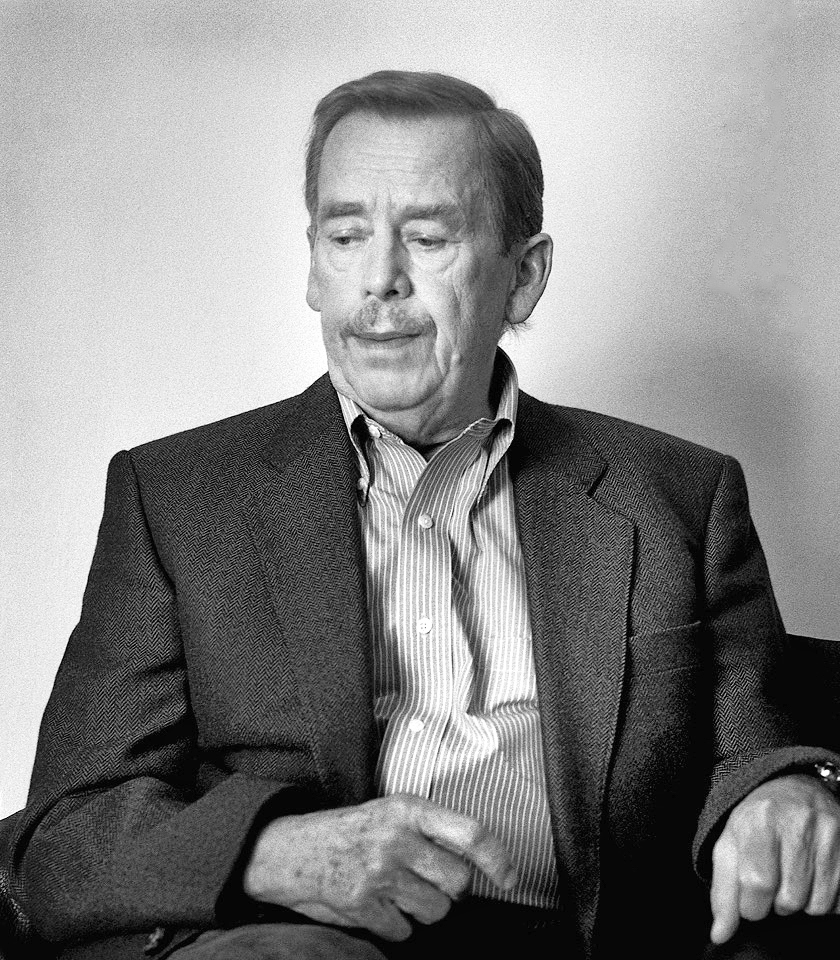
Václav Havel, playwright, dissident and president from 1989 to 2003

In February 1948, the Communist Party of Czechoslovakia seized power in a coup d'état. Klement Gottwald became the first communist president. He nationalized the country's industry and collectivized its farms to form Sovkhozs inspired by the Soviet model. Czechoslovakia thus became a part of the Eastern Bloc. Attempts at a reformation of the political system during the Prague Spring of 1968 were ended by the invasion of armies of the Warsaw Pact. The Czechoslovakia remained under the rule of the Communist Party until the Velvet Revolution of 1989.

=== Post-Cold War ===
One of the leaders of the dissent, Václav Havel became the first president of the democratic Czechoslovakia. Slovakia's demands for sovereignty were fulfilled at the end of 1992, when the representatives of Czechs and Slovaks agreed to split the Czechoslovakia into the Czech Republic and the Slovak Republic. The official start of the current Czech Republic was set on 1 January 1993. The Czech Republic became a member of NATO on 12 March 1999, and the European Union on 1 May 2004. In 2013, the Czech Republic held its first direct presidenal election, with Miloš Zeman being elected president.

== See also ==
- Lech, Czech and Rus
- Politics of the Czech Republic

Lists

- List of presidents of Czechoslovakia
- List of prime ministers of Czechoslovakia
- List of presidents of the Czech Republic
- List of prime ministers of the Czech Republic
- List of rebellions in the Czech Republic
