= Petřkovice =

Locations in the Czech Republic

Petřkovice may refer to:

- FC Odra Petřkovice - a Czech football club located in the Petřkovice district of Ostrava
- Petřkovice (Ostrava) – a municipal district of the city of Ostrava, Czech Republic
- Petřkovice (Starý Jičín) – a part of the village of Starý Jičín, Czech Republic
