= List of rebellions in the Czech Republic =

This article lists major rebellions and revolutions that have taken place during Czech history.

== Mythical Bohemia ==
- The Maidens' War

== Duchy of Bohemia (870–1198) ==
- Vršovci uprising against Boleslaus III (1002)
- Uprising against Boleslaus III (1003)
- Uprising against Vladislaus II (1142)

== Kingdom of Bohemia (1198–1526) ==
- Hussite Wars (1419–1434)
- Kutná Hora miners' uprising (1496)

== Habsburg Monarchy (1526–1918) ==
- The Estates Revolt in Bohemia (1547)
- Bohemian Revolt (1618–1620)
- Vlach uprisings in Moravia (1620–1644)
- Peasant Rebellion (1628)
- Peasant Rebellion (1680)
- Uprising of the Chods (1693)
- Peasant Rebellion (1695)
- Peasant Rebellion (1775)
- Peasant Rebellion (1821)
- Prague uprising (1848)
- Rumburk rebellion (1918)

== Czechoslovakia (1918–1992) ==
- Železná Ruda uprising (1919)
- Oslavany uprising (1920)
- Židenice coup (1933)
- Sudeten German uprising (1938)
- May Uprising of the Czech people (1945)
  - Prague uprising
  - Holice uprising
  - Jilemnice uprising
  - Kladno uprising
  - Plzeň uprising
  - Přerov uprising
- Plzeň uprising (1953)
- Bytíz prison riot (1968)
- Czechoslovak Hockey Riots (1969)
- Velvet Revolution (1989)

== Czech Republic (Since 1993) ==
- Prison riots (2000)
- Czech TV crisis (2000–2001)
- 2011 Czech prison uprisings plot (2011)
