= Petřkovice (Ostrava) =

Borough of Ostrava, Czech Republic

- Borough of Ostrava
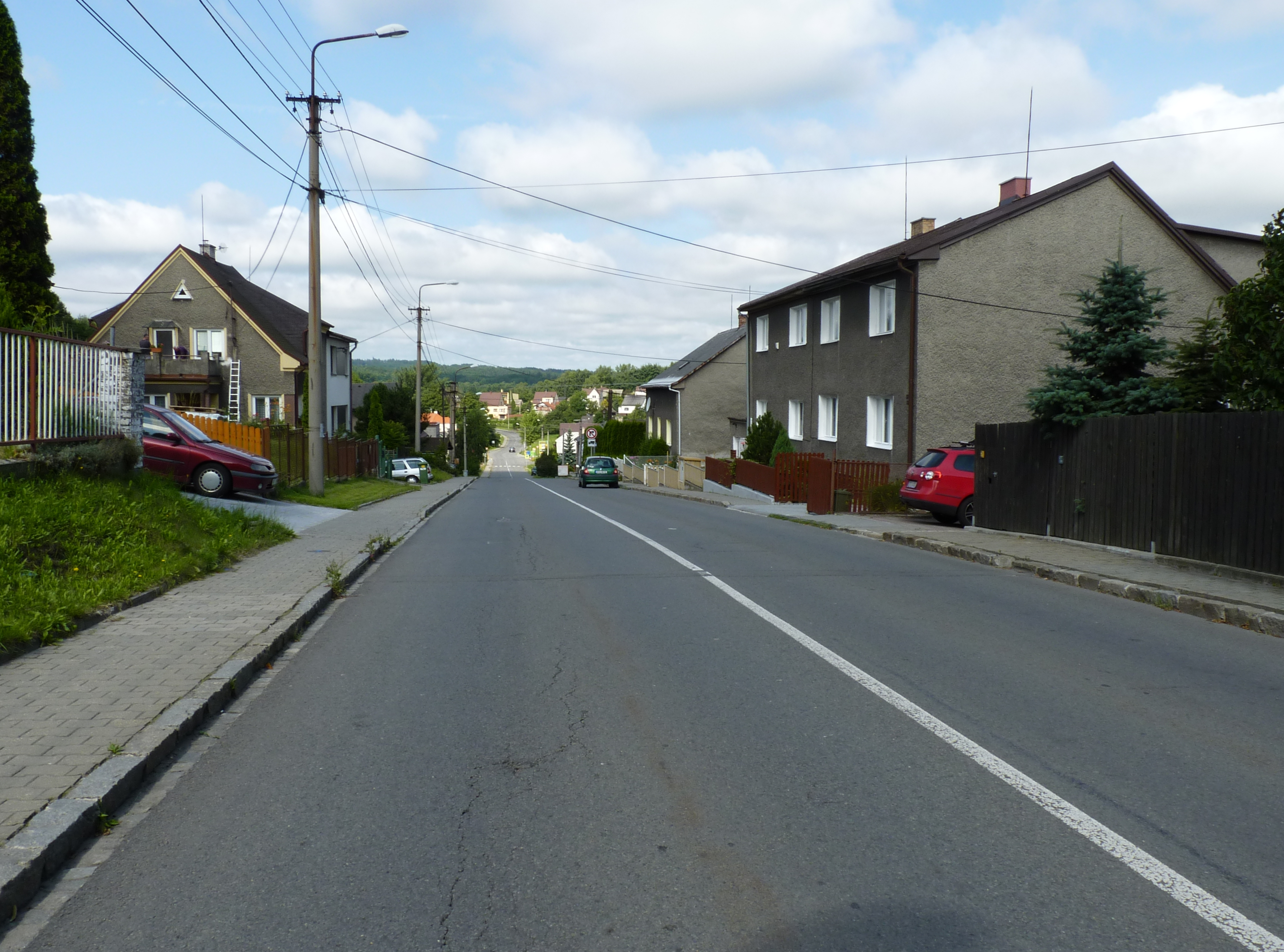
- Koblovská street

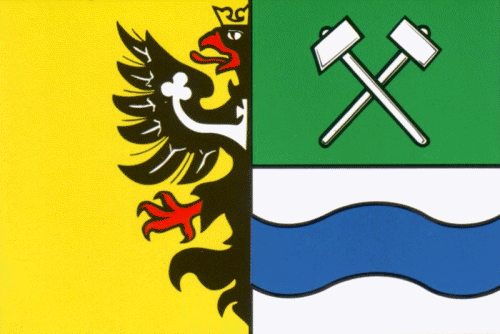
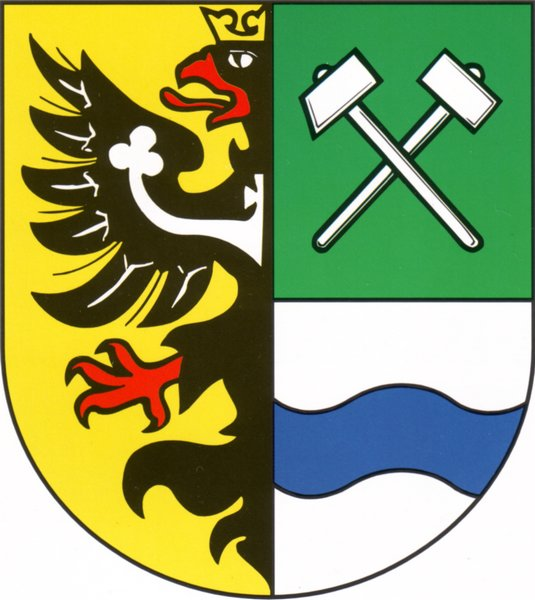
- Flag Coat of arms

- Location of Petřkovice in Ostrava
- Coordinates: 49°52′30″N 18°15′32″E
- Country: Czech Republic
- Region: Moravian-Silesian
- Municipality: Ostrava

Area
  - Total: 3.90 km^{2} (1.51 sq mi)

Population (2021)
  - Total: 3,140
  - Density: 805/km^{2} (2,090/sq mi)
- Time zone: UTC+1 (CET)
  - Summer (DST): UTC+2 (CEST)
- Postal code: 725 29
- Website: petrkovice.ostrava.cz

Petřkovice is a borough and municipal part of the city of Ostrava in the Czech Republic. It is situated in the northern part of the city, above the confluence of the Oder and Ostravice rivers. Originally a separate municipality, Petřkovice was incorporated into Ostrava in 1971. On 24 November 1990, it became one of the 23 self-governing boroughs of Ostrava.

In the 1950s, the Venus of Petřkovice was found in the area of Petřkovice.

== Etymology ==
The name is derived from the Czech given name Petr, who was presumably a lokator, meaning "Petr's settlement".

== Sights ==
A mining museum is situated on the Landek hill in Petřkovice, offering guided tours through a former coal mine at a depth of 1 km (0.62 mi).

== Gallery ==
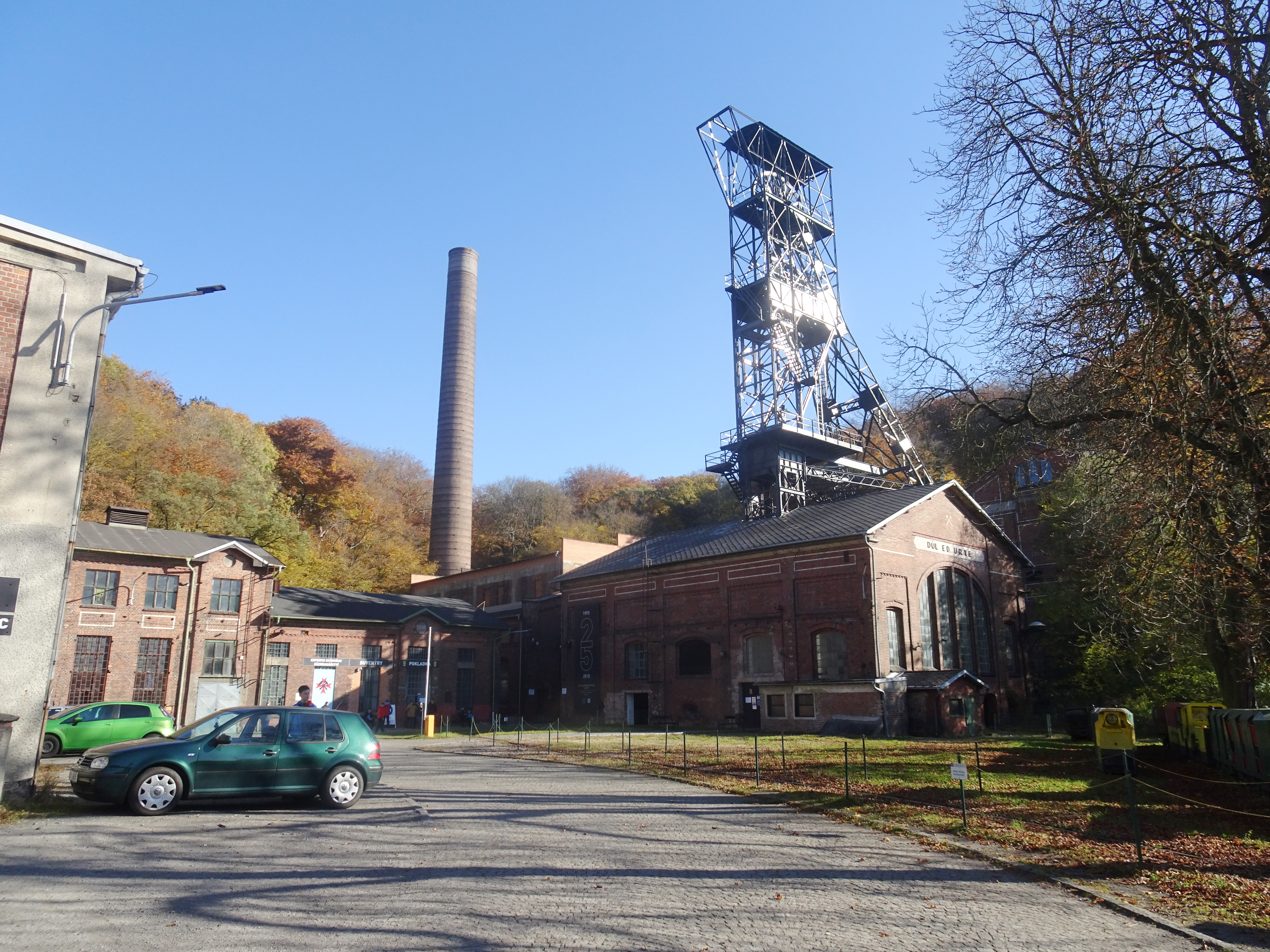
Mining museum on the Landek hill

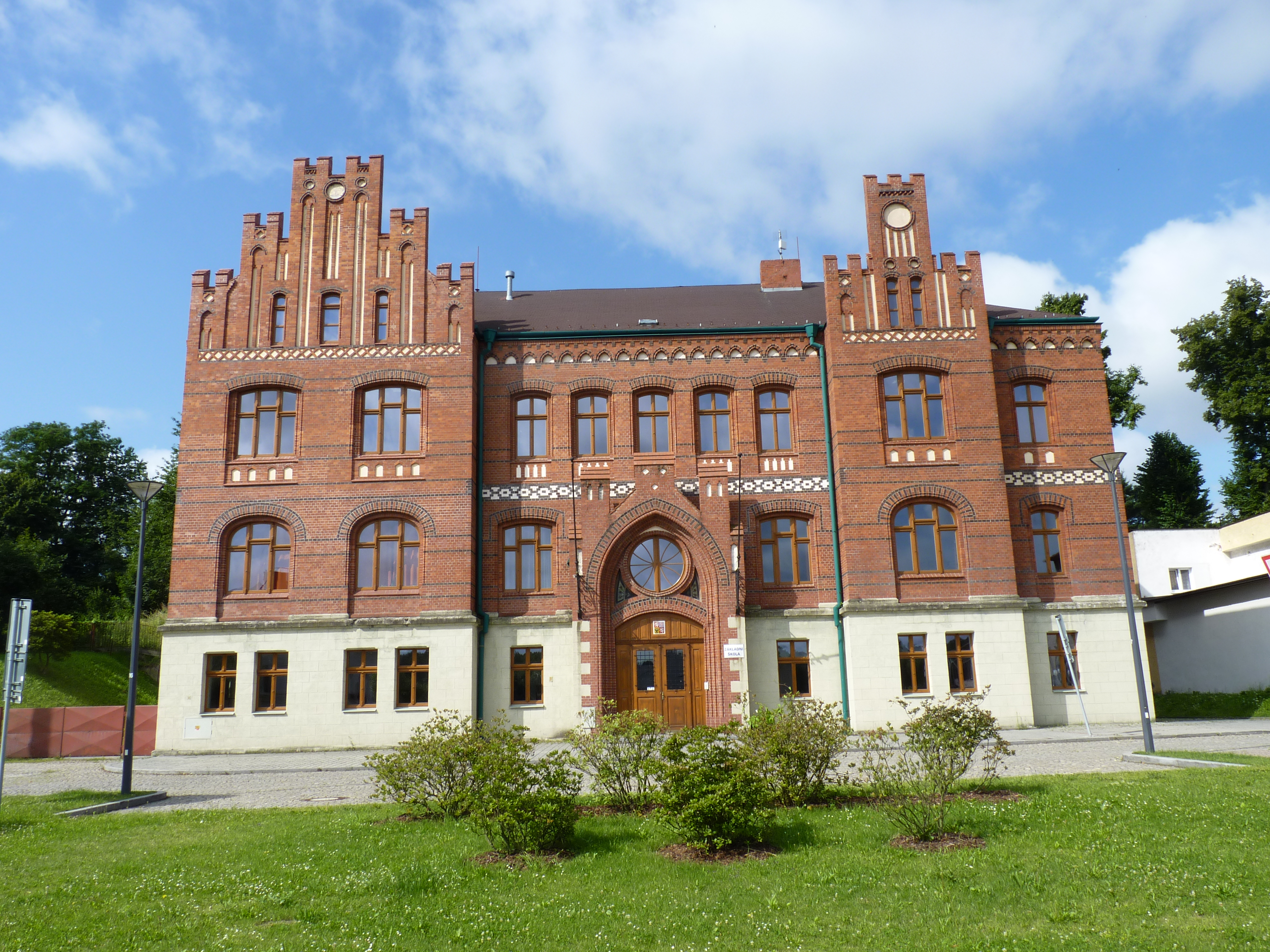
Primary school

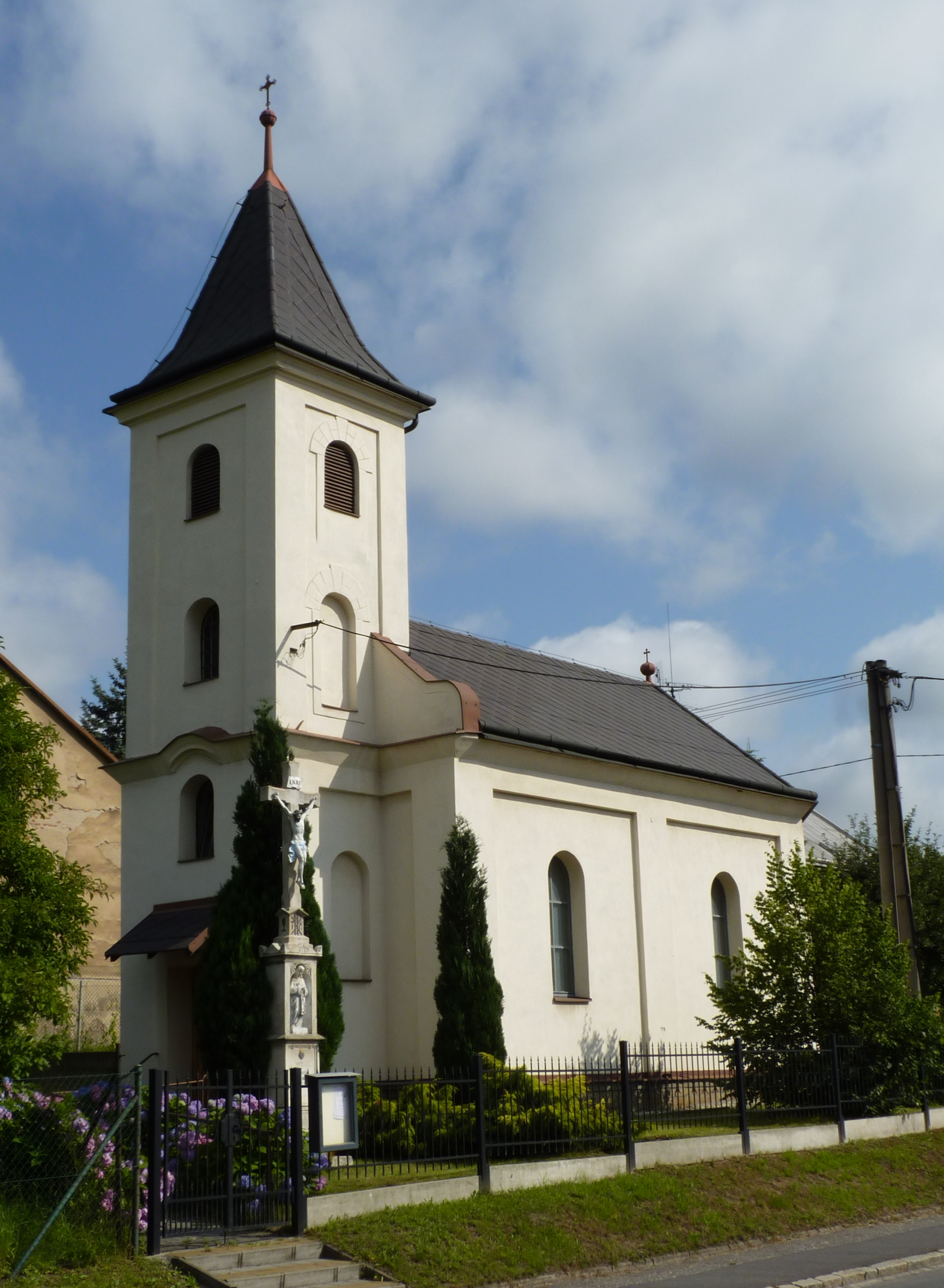
Chapel in Petřkovice
