= Venus of Petřkovice =

Mineral statuette of a nude female figure

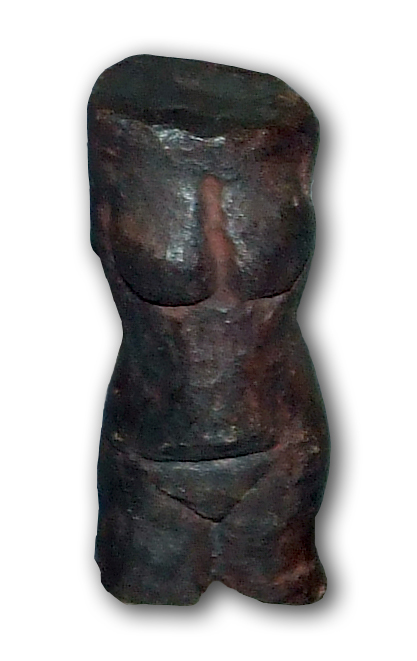
- Replica of Venus of Petřkovice
- Material: Hematite
- Size: Height: 4.5 cm
- Created: 25,000 years
- Discovered: 14 July 1953; Ostrava, Czechoslovakia
- Discovered by: Bohuslav Klíma
- Present location: Brno, Czech Republic

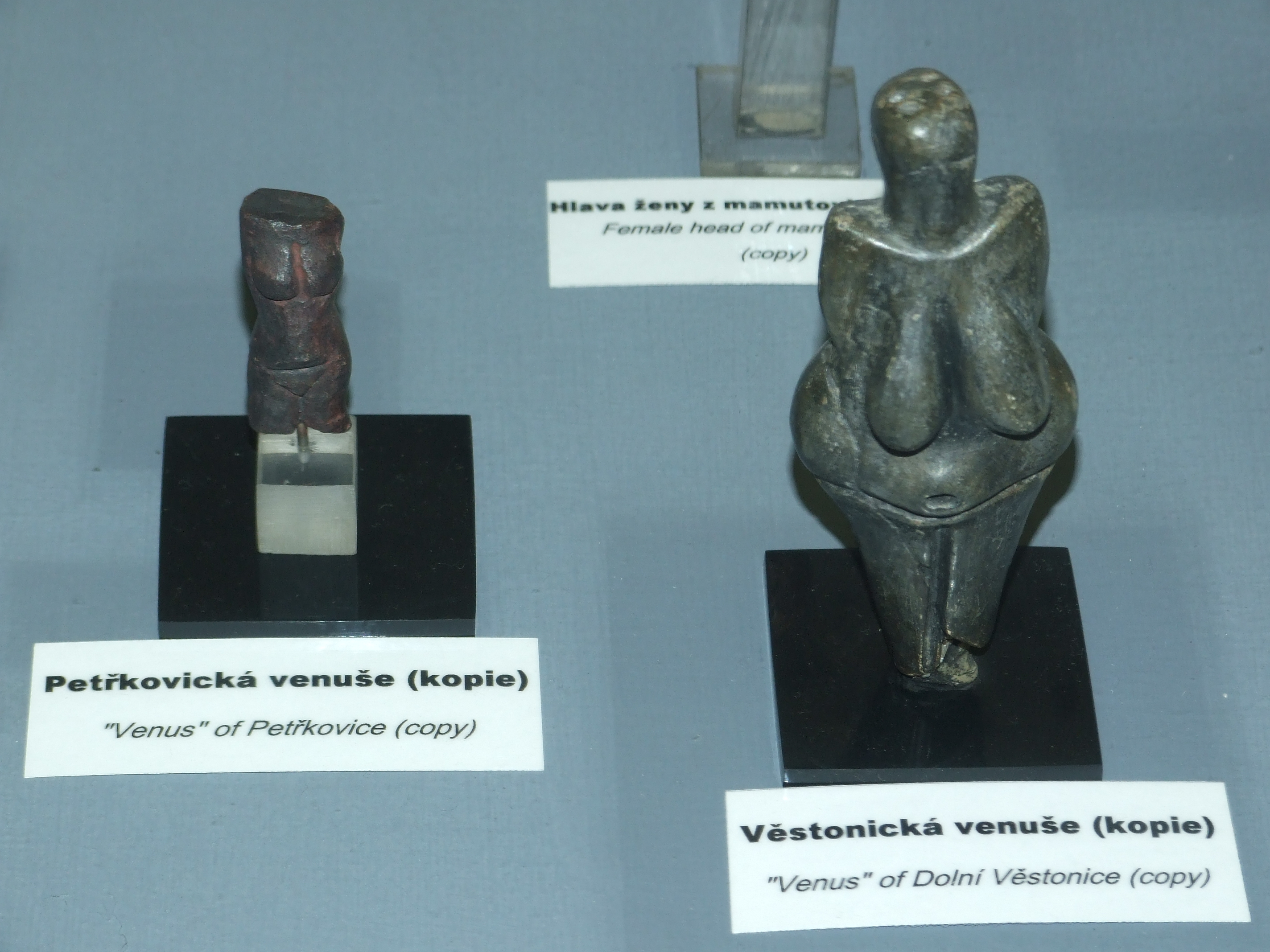
Copy of Venus of Petřkovice beside that of Venus of Dolní Věstonice at an exhibition in the National Museum, Prague

The Venus of Petřkovice (Czech: Petřkovická venuše or Landecká venuše) is a pre-historic Venus figurine founded in what is today the Czech Republic. It is a mineral statuette of a nude female figure, dated to about 23,000 BCE (Gravettian industry).

== Discovery ==
The statue was found within the Petřkovice part of Ostrava in the Czech Republic, by archaeologist Bohuslav Klíma on 14 July 1953. It was beneath a mammoth molar at an ancient settlement of mammoth hunters. Many stone artifacts and skeletal fragments were also found nearby.

== Features ==
The statue measures 4.5 x 1.5 x 1.4 cm and is a headless torso of a woman carved from iron ore (hematite). Uniquely, the absence of the head appears to be the author's intention. Also, unlike other prehistoric Venus figurines, it shows a slender young woman or girl with small breasts.

== Location ==
The statue is in the Institute of Archaeology, Brno. Between 7 February and 26 May 2013, it was displayed in the exhibition Ice Age Art: Arrival of the Modern Mind at the British Museum in London.

== See also ==
- Art of the Upper Paleolithic
- List of Stone Age art
