= Přezletice =

- Municipality
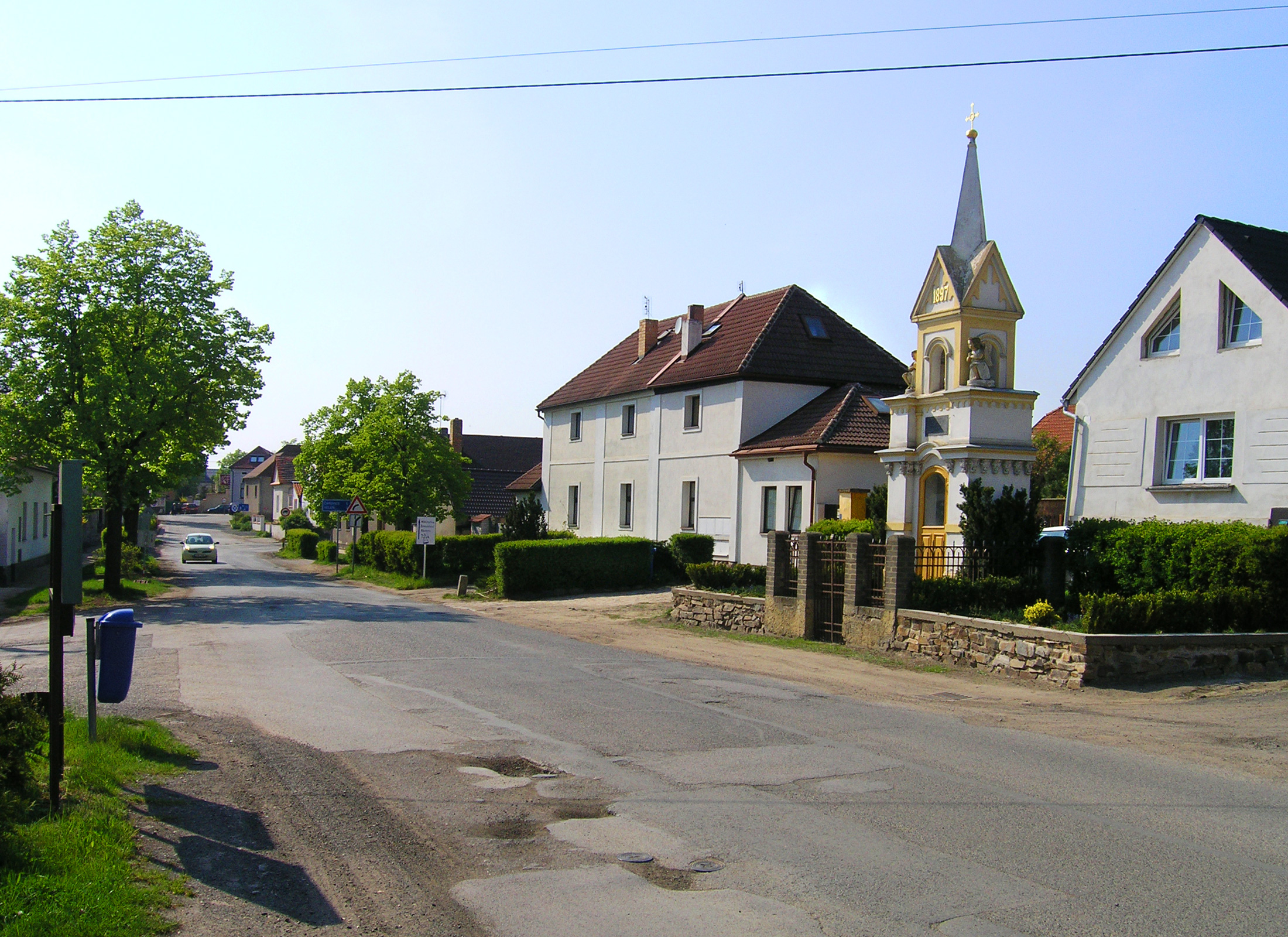
- Chapel of the Virgin Mary

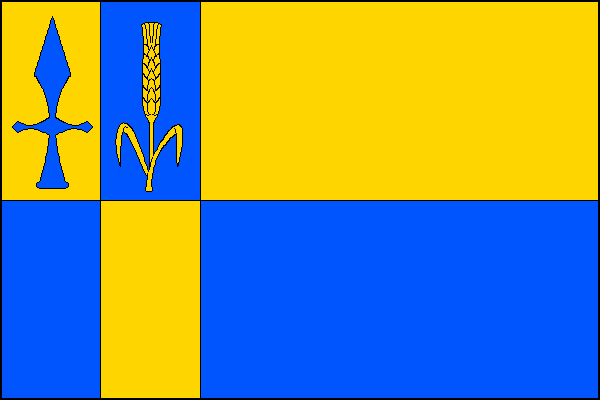
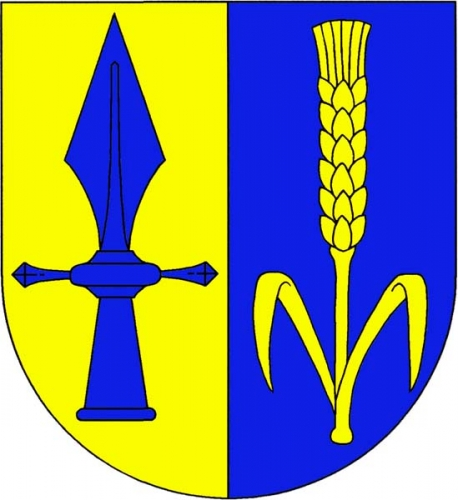
- Flag Coat of arms

- Location in the Czech Republic
- Coordinates: 50°9′19″N 14°34′32″E
- Country: Czech Republic
- Region: Central Bohemian
- District: Prague-East
- First mentioned: 1352

Area
  - Total: 4.16 km^{2} (1.61 sq mi)
- Elevation: 232 m (761 ft)

Population (2026-01-01)
  - Total: 2,495
  - Density: 600/km^{2} (1,550/sq mi)
- Time zone: UTC+1 (CET)
  - Summer (DST): UTC+2 (CEST)
- Postal code: 250 73
- Website: prezletice.cz

Přezletice is a municipality and village in Prague-East District in the Central Bohemian Region of the Czech Republic. It has about 2,500 inhabitants.

== Etymology ==
The name was probably derived from the word přezlý (i.e. 'very evil').

== Geography ==
Přezletice is located about 7 kilometres (4 mi) northeast of Prague. It lies in a flat agricultural landscape in the Central Elbe Table.

== History ==
The first written mention of Přezletice is from 1352. Until the end of the 16th century, it was owned by various lesser noble families. From the end of the 16th century, Přezletice was a part of the Ctěnice estate.

== Demographics ==
Historical population

| Year | Pop. | ±% |
|---|---|---|
| 1869 | 419 | — |
| 1880 | 510 | +21.7% |
| 1890 | 592 | +16.1% |
| 1900 | 599 | +1.2% |
| 1910 | 595 | −0.7% |

| Year | Pop. | ±% |
|---|---|---|
| 1921 | 586 | −1.5% |
| 1930 | 722 | +23.2% |
| 1950 | 693 | −4.0% |
| 1961 | 685 | −1.2% |
| 1970 | 718 | +4.8% |

| Year | Pop. | ±% |
|---|---|---|
| 1980 | 738 | +2.8% |
| 1991 | 635 | −14.0% |
| 2001 | 736 | +15.9% |
| 2011 | 1,248 | +69.6% |
| 2021 | 2,247 | +80.0% |

Source: Censuses

== Transport ==
There are no railways or major roads passing through the municipality.

== Sights ==
The only protected cultural monument in the municipality is the site of a Paleolithic camp, now an archaeological site. In the centre of Přezletice is the Chapel of the Virgin Mary.
