= Deaths in May 2016 =

The following is a list of notable deaths in May 2016.

Entries for each day are listed alphabetically by surname. A typical entry lists information in the following sequence:

- Name, age, country of citizenship and reason for notability, established cause of death, reference.

== May 2016 ==
=== 1 ===
- Hamzat Ahmadu, 91–92, Nigerian diplomat, Ambassador to the Soviet Union, Netherlands, Cameroon, the Bahamas, and the United States.
- Steve Eisenhauer, 84, American football player and lieutenant colonel.
- Richard Gilpin, 76, British Anglican priest, Archdeacon of Totnes (1996–2005).
- Jean-Marie Girault, 90, French politician, Mayor of Caen (1970–2001).
- Solomon W. Golomb, 83, American mathematician and engineer.
- Norman Hines, 77, American sculptor.
- Madeleine Lebeau, 92, French actress (Casablanca, 8½, Gentlemen Jim), complications from a broken thigh bone.
- Merv Lincoln, 82, Australian Olympic middle-distance runner (1956, 1960).
- Swasti Mitter, 76, Indian development economist.
- Sydney Onayemi, 78, Nigerian-born Swedish DJ.
- Doug Raney, 59, American jazz guitarist, heart failure.

=== 2 ===
- Jeremy duQuesnay Adams, 82, American medieval historian.
- Balwantrai Bhatt, 94, Indian composer and musician.
- Basil Blackshaw, 84, Northern Irish artist.
- Tobias de Boer, 85, Dutch scientist.
- Jonathan Cainer, 58, British astrologer (Daily Mail), heart failure.
- Richard Davis, 66, English radio astronomer.
- Walter Dürst, 89, Swiss ice hockey player, Olympic bronze medalist (1948).
- Alan Elsdon, 81, English jazz trumpeter and flugelhornist.
- Mozibur Rahman Fakir, 69, Bangladeshi politician, cardiac arrest.
- Al Ferrari, 82, American basketball player (St. Louis Hawks, Chicago Zephyrs).
- Paul Hofer, 87, Swiss Olympic ice hockey player.
- John Kaye, 60, Australian politician, member of the New South Wales Legislative Council (since 2007), cancer.
- Milton Kerker, 95, American physical chemist.
- Jacky Lee, 77, American football player (Denver Broncos, Kansas City Chiefs), Alzheimer's disease.
- Balraj Madhok, 96, Indian politician, President of Bharatiya Jana Sangh (1966–1967).
- Tomohiro Matsu, 43, Japanese light novel writer (Listen to Me, Girls. I Am Your Father!, Mayoi Neko Overrun!), liver cancer.
- Paul McDowell, 84, British actor and singer (The Temperance Seven).
- Myles McKeon, 97, Irish-born Australian Roman Catholic prelate, Bishop of Bunbury (1969–1982).
- Roger Millward, 68, British rugby league player (Hull Kingston Rovers, Castleford Tigers, national team).
- Karel Pečko, 95, Slovenian artist.
- Stasys Petronaitis, 83, Lithuanian actor.
- Afeni Shakur, 69, American businesswoman (Tupac Amaru Shakur Center for the Arts, Amaru Entertainment, Makaveli Branded) and political activist (Black Panthers).
- George Smallwood, 70, American musician, heart attack.
- Fernando Soto Aparicio, 82, Colombian author.
- Wilfried Straub, 77, German football official.
- Gordie Sundin, 78, American baseball player (Baltimore Orioles).

=== 3 ===
- Sven Andersson, 94, Swedish Olympic speed skater.
- Charlie Beamon, 81, American baseball player (Baltimore Orioles).
- Paul Boutelle, 81, American politician, Socialist Workers candidate for U.S. Vice President (1968), kidney cancer.
- Ian Deans, 78, Canadian politician, MP (1980–1986), Parkinson's disease.
- Clive Dym, 73, British engineer.
- Kristian Ealey, 38, British actor (Brookside, Hollyoaks).
- Fan Lichu, 82, Chinese bridge structural engineer and academician (Chinese Academy of Engineering).
- Abel Fernandez, 85, American actor (The Untouchables, Pork Chop Hill).
- Marianne Gaba, 76, American model and actress (Missile to the Moon, The Choppers, The Beverly Hillbillies), brain cancer.
- Gao Shan, 53, Chinese geochemist and academician (Chinese Academy of Sciences).
- Tadeusz Gocłowski, 84, Polish Roman Catholic prelate, Archbishop of Gdańsk (1992–2008), stroke.
- Sarah D. Grant, 72, American judge.
- John A. C. Greppin, 79, American scholar.
- Sunil Gudge, 56, Indian cricketer (Maharashtra), heart attack.
- Kaname Harada, 99, Japanese World War II flying ace, multiple organ failure.
- Frank Levingston, 110, American supercentenarian, nation's oldest World War II veteran.
- Thomas W. Libous, 63, American politician, member of the New York State Senate (1989–2015), cancer.
- Karol Machata, 88, Slovak actor (St. Peter's Umbrella).
- Graeme McCall, 78, Australian Olympic rower.
- Allan L. McCutcheon, 66, American sociologist and statistician.
- Nicolas Noxon, 79, American filmmaker (Secrets of the Titanic), pancreatic cancer.
- Ian Quigley, 84, New Zealand politician, MP for Otago Central (1972–1975).
- Carl Fredrik Reuterswärd, 81, Swedish artist (Non-Violence), pneumonia.
- Ian Sander, 68, American television producer and director (Ghost Whisperer, Profiler, I'll Fly Away), heart attack.
- Shinji Satō, 84, Japanese politician, heart failure.
- Domingo Siazon Jr., 76, Philippine politician and diplomat, Secretary of Foreign Affairs (1995–2001), ambassador to Austria and Japan.
- Jadranka Stojaković, 65, Bosnian singer-songwriter, motor neuron disease.
- Gordon Strachan, 68, Scottish rugby union player, cardiac amyloidosis.
- Janusz Tazbir, 87, Polish historian.

=== 4 ===
- Tutty Alawiyah, 74, Indonesian politician, Minister for Women's Affairs (1998–1999).
- Ángel de Andrés López, 64, Spanish actor (What Have I Done to Deserve This?, 800 Bullets, Taxi).
- Blas Avena, 32, American mixed martial artist (WEC), suicide.
- Sir Jack Baer, 91, British art dealer.
- Jean-Baptiste Bagaza, 69, Burundian politician, President (1976–1987).
- Bob Bennett, 82, American politician, U.S. Senator from Utah (1993–2011), pancreatic cancer and stroke.
- Gaetan Boucher, 59, Canadian-born Swiss Olympic ice hockey player (1988), (HC Villars).
- Karl Butzer, 81, German-born American geographer.
- Michael Caborn-Waterfield, 86, British businessman (Ann Summers).
- Giuseppe Faraca, 56, Italian racing cyclist.
- Howard King, 83, American public address announcer (Michigan Stadium).
- Olle Ljungström, 54, Swedish singer and guitarist.
- Ursula Mamlok, 93, German-born American composer.
- James Oyedeji, 63, Ghanaian sports historian.
- Paul A. Paddock, 41, American artist.
- Jordan Parsons, 25, American mixed martial artist (Bellator), traffic collision.
- Joseph R. Pisani, 86, American politician.
- Rita Renoir, 82, French strip-teaser and actress.
- Friedrich Schattleitner, 92, Austrian Olympic sport shooter (1968).
- Ret Turner, 87, American fashion designer (Cher, Dolly Parton, Carol Burnett).
- Adlan Varayev, 54, Russian wrestler, Olympic silver medalist (1988), drowned.
- John Wright, 75, British Army officer and polo administrator.

=== 5 ===
- Wan Mohammad Khair-il Anuar, 56, Malaysian politician, MP (since 2013), Chairman of Malaysian Palm Oil Board, helicopter crash.
- Benito Cocchi, 81, Italian Roman Catholic prelate, Archbishop of Modena-Nonantola (1996–2010).
- Bentot Jr., 46, Filipino actor.
- Rollin Dart, 90, American banker (Dart National Bank).
- Matt Irwin, 36, British celebrity photographer, suicide by GHB overdose.
- Noriah Kasnon, 52, Malaysian politician, MP (since 2004), helicopter crash.
- Sylvia Kauders, 94, American actress (Inside Llewyn Davis, Witness, Predator 2), heart attack.
- Bill MacDermott, 79, American CFL coach (Edmonton Eskimos).
- Anne Atai Omoruto, 59, Ugandan medical doctor, cancer.
- Romalı Perihan, 74, Turkish actress and singer.
- Fred C. Robinson, 85, American academic.
- Siné, 87, French political cartoonist.
- Gabriel Thohey Mahn-Gaby, 88, Burmese Roman Catholic prelate, Archbishop of Yangon (1971–2002).
- Isao Tomita, 84, Japanese synthesizer musician, composer and arranger (Snowflakes Are Dancing), heart failure.
- Martha Seim Valeur, 93, Norwegian politician, Deputy MP (1993–1997).
- Nancy Zahniser, 67, American pharmacologist, glioblastoma.

=== 6 ===
- Loretta Abbott, 83, American dancer and choreographer.
- Klaus Ampler, 75, German Olympic racing cyclist (1968).
- Johannes Bauer, 61, German trombonist.
- Nico de Bree, 71, Dutch footballer (NEC, Anderlecht), cancer.
- Paul H. Brown, 82, American jazz bassist.
- Scott Burgess, 57, Australian actor, (Water Rats), heart attack.
- Ramón Carlín, 92, Mexican sailor.
- Patrick Ekeng, 26, Cameroonian footballer (Le Mans, Dinamo București, national team), heart attack.
- Dick Estell, 90, American radio host (The Radio Reader).
- Roberta Gellis, 88, American author.
- Reg Grundy, 92, Australian television production mogul (Reg Grundy Organisation).
- David Hall, 85, American politician, Governor of Oklahoma (1971–1975), stroke.
- Lakshmi Holmström, 81, Indian-born British author and translator.
- Margot Honecker, 89, East German politician, Minister of People's Education (1963–1989), First Lady (1976–1989).
- Johnny Joannou, 76, American politician, member of the Virginia House of Delegates (1976–1983, 1998–2016) and Senate (1984–1992), lung cancer.
- Candye Kane, 54, American blues singer-songwriter and pornographic actress, pancreatic cancer.
- Li Wanheng, 92, Chinese soldier, commander of the 67th Army of the People's Liberation Army (1981–1983).
- George Mandler, 91, American psychologist.
- Pierre, 33, American penguin, renal failure.
- Larry Pinto de Faria, 83, Brazilian footballer (Sport Club Internacional).
- Niklaus Schilling, 72, Swiss filmmaker (The Expulsion from Paradise).
- Kōjō Tanaka, 91, Japanese photographer.
- Abu Waheeb, 29–30, Iraqi field commander (ISIL) and prison escapee (Camp Bucca), airstrike.
- Christopher Wathes, 64, British research scientist.
- Billy Wicks, 84, American professional wrestler.
- Valeriy Zuyev, 63, Ukrainian football player (Dynamo Kyiv) and manager.

=== 7 ===
- Fernando Álvarez de Miranda, 92, Spanish politician, President of the Congress of Deputies (1977–1979).
- Comply or Die, 16, British thoroughbred racehorse, won the Grand National (2008).
- Ann Day, 77, American politician, member of the Arizona Senate (1990–2000), traffic collision.
- Zeno Fernández, 75, Mexican Olympic field hockey player.
- Howard Garfinkel, 86, American basketball scout.
- Merritt Green, 85, American lawyer and judge.
- Michael S. Harper, 78, American poet.
- Mohammad-Ali Hosseinzadeh, 39, Iranian politician, traffic collision.
- John Krish, 92, British film director.
- Gonzalo López Marañon, 82, Spanish-born Ecuadorian Roman Catholic prelate, Vicar Apostolic of San Miguel de Sucumbíos (1970–2010).
- José Roberto Marques, 70, Brazilian footballer (São Paulo).
- Chris Mitchell, 27, Scottish footballer (Queen of the South, Clyde), suicide by train.
- Bernardo Ribeiro, 26, Brazilian footballer (Skënderbeu, Newcastle Jets, IFK Mariehamn), cardiac arrest.
- George Ross, 73, Scottish footballer (Preston North End).
- John Stabb, 54, American punk singer (Government Issue), stomach cancer.
- Nikita Struve, 85, French literary critic and publisher.
- Anne van den Ban, 88, Dutch agricultural economist.
- Khurram Zaki, 40, Pakistani rights activist, shot.

=== 8 ===
- Tom M. Apostol, 92, American analytic number theorist and professor.
- Philippe Beaussant, 86, French author.
- John Bradshaw, 82, American self-help writer, heart failure.
- Tonita Castro, 63, Mexican-born American actress (Dads, Funny People, The Book of Life), stomach cancer.
- Louisa Chase, 65, American painter.
- Sir Iain Glidewell, 91, British jurist, Lord Justice of Appeal (1985–1995).
- Ken Gorgal, 87, American football player (Cleveland Browns, Chicago Bears).
- Gareth Gwenlan, 79, British television producer (Only Fools and Horses).
- Joan Helpern, 89, American shoe designer.
- Nick Lashaway, 28, American actor (Girls, In Time, The Last Song), traffic collision.
- Elisa Mainardi, 85, Italian actress (Fellini Satyricon).
- Wolfgang Patzke, 57, German footballer.
- George E. Russell, 83, Canadian painter.
- Geneviève Salbaing, 94, French-born Canadian dancer and choreographer.
- William Schallert, 93, American actor (The Patty Duke Show, The Many Loves of Dobie Gillis, In the Heat of the Night), President of SAG (1979–1981).
- Shirley E. Schwartz, 80, American chemist.
- Rajesh Nandini Singh, 59, Indian politician, member of the Lok Sabha (2009–2014), heart attack.
- Friedrich von Huene, 87, German-born American woodwind maker.
- John Young, 67, American baseball player (Detroit Tigers), founder of Reviving Baseball in Inner Cities.
- Thomas Zhang Huai-xin, 90, Chinese clandestine Roman Catholic prelate, Bishop of Jixian (since 1981).

=== 9 ===
- Beverley Bainbridge, 76, Australian Olympic swimmer.
- Chuck Curtis, 80, American football coach (University of Texas at Arlington).
- Andi Muhammad Ghalib, 69, Indonesian politician, Attorney General (1998–1999), Ambassador to India (2008–2013).
- Rex Hughes, 77, American basketball coach (Sacramento Kings).
- Walther Leisler Kiep, 90, German politician, member of the Bundestag (1965–1976, 1980–1982).
- Sandy Lewis, 85, Australian politician.
- Bill MacIlwraith, 88, British playwright and screenwriter (Two's Company).
- Karl Maramorosch, 101, Austrian-born American virologist, entomologist and plant pathologist.
- Dennis Nineham, 94, British theologian.
- Chennamaneni Rajeshwara Rao, 92, Indian politician.
- Kelly Stearne, 57, Canadian curler.
- Gijs Verdick, 21, Dutch professional cyclist, heart attack.
- Ronald W. Walker, 76, American historian, lymphoma.
- John Warr, 88, English cricketer.

=== 10 ===
- Mustafa Badreddine, 55, Lebanese military commander (Hezbollah, Syrian Civil War), convicted planner of 1983 Kuwait bombings, explosion.
- Heinz-Georg Baus, 82, German billionaire and businessman, owner of Bauhaus AG.
- Jack Boothman, 79, Irish sports administrator, President of the Gaelic Athletic Association (1994–1997).
- Sally Brampton, 60, British writer and magazine editor (Elle), suicide by drowning.
- Deborah Clingeleffer, 66, Australian rower and educator, heart attack.
- Sarah Corp, 41, British television producer, lung cancer.
- Nicholas Fisk, 92, British children's author.
- Carlos García y García, 88, Peruvian politician, Second Vice President (1990–1992).
- Louis van Gasteren, 93, Dutch filmmaker and artist.
- Gene Gutowski, 90, Polish-born American film producer (The Pianist, The Fearless Vampire Killers, Cul-de-sac), pneumonia.
- Ilkka Hanski, 63, Finnish ecologist.
- Kang Young-hoon, 93, South Korean politician, Prime Minister (1988–1990).
- Mark Lane, 89, American lawyer, author (Rush to Judgment, Plausible Denial) and screenwriter (Executive Action), heart attack.
- Thomas Luckmann, 88, Slovene-born American sociologist (The Social Construction of Reality).
- François Morellet, 90, French painter, sculptor and light artist.
- Betty Sabo, 87, American artist.
- Shi Ping, 82, Chinese aircraft designer (Hongdu JL-8) and academic (Chinese Academy of Engineering).
- Steve Smith, 26, Canadian mountain biker, race collision.
- Riki Sorsa, 63, Finnish singer ("Reggae OK"), cancer.
- Margaret Walker, 91, British sprinter.

=== 11 ===
- Peter Behrens, 68, German drummer (Trio), multiple organ failure.
- Bobby Carroll, 77, Scottish footballer (Celtic).
- Tony Cozier, 75, Barbadian cricket writer and commentator.
- Katherine Dunn, 70, American writer (Geek Love), lung cancer.
- Dutch Hoag, 89, American racing driver.
- Abdul Baqi Jammoh, 93–94, Jordanian politician, Senator (1997–2001).
- David King, 73, British graphic designer, art collector and writer (The Commissar Vanishes).
- Promode Mankin, 77, Bangladeshi politician.
- Anton Muheim, 99, Swiss politician, President of the National Council (1973–1974).
- Motiur Rahman Nizami, 73, Bangladeshi politician and convicted war criminal, leader of Jamaat (since 2000), MP for Pabna (1991–1996, 2001–2006), execution by hanging.
- Herman Obermayer, 91, American journalist and publisher (Northern Virginia Sun).
- Jim Pothecary, 82, South African cricketer (Western Province, national team).
- Michael Ratner, 72, American lawyer, won right of habeas corpus for Guantanamo Bay detainees, complications from cancer.
- Majid al-Shibl, 80–81, Saudi Arabian announcer.
- Joe Temperley, 86, Scottish saxophonist (Jazz at Lincoln Center Orchestra), cancer.
- Jack L. Treynor, 86, American economist.

=== 12 ===
- Mike Agostini, 81, Trinidadian-born Australian Olympic sprinter (1956), Commonwealth Games gold medalist (1954).
- Prince Alexander of Yugoslavia, 91, Serbian royal.
- Denise Bernot, 94, French academic.
- Sidney Brazier, 96, British army bomb disposal officer.
- Jack Diamond, 75, British comedian.
- Ulf Grenander, 92, Swedish statistician.
- Denis Hardy, 80, Canadian politician, Vice President of the National Assembly of Quebec (1970–1973).
- Susannah Mushatt Jones, 116, American supercentenarian, world's oldest living person.
- Bohumil Kubát, 81, Czech wrestler, Olympic bronze medalist (1960).
- Julius La Rosa, 86, American pop singer ("Anywhere I Wander", "Eh, Cumpari!") and actor (Another World).
- Del Latta, 96, American politician, member of the United States House of Representatives from Ohio's 5th congressional district (1959–1989).
- Peter J. Liacouras, 85, American academic, President of Temple University (1981–2000).
- Giuseppe Maiani, 92, Sammarinese politician, Captain Regent (1955–1956, 1982).
- Tapio Mäkelä, 89, Finnish cross-country skier, Olympic gold medalist (1952).
- Giovanni Migliorati, 73, Italian-born Ethiopian Roman Catholic prelate, Vicar Apostolic of Awasa (since 2009).
- Yukio Ninagawa, 80, Japanese film and theatre director, pneumonia.
- Bob Ray Offenhauser, 89, American architect.
- Raghunath Patnaik, 89, Indian politician, heart disease.
- Gerry Pattison, 92, American actress (Law of the West).
- Georges Sesia, 91, French footballer.
- Hugh Smith, 81, American football player (Washington Redskins).

=== 13 ===
- Seiji Arikawa, 86, Japanese politician, member of the House of Representatives (1990–1993).
- Bill Backer, 89, American advertising executive (McCann Erickson) and songwriter ("I'd Like to Teach the World to Sing (In Perfect Harmony)").
- Ondrej Binder, 46, Slovak politician, member of the National Council (2016), traffic collision.
- Buster Cooper, 87, American jazz trombonist, prostate cancer.
- Karl Eigen, 88, German farmer and politician, member of the Bundestag (1972–1976, 1980–1990).
- Sammy Ellis, 75, American baseball player (Cincinnati Reds), cancer.
- Rodrigo Espíndola, 26, Argentine footballer (Nueva Chicago), shot.
- Makiko Futaki, 57, Japanese animator (Akira, Spirited Away, My Neighbour Totoro).
- David McNiven Garner, 87, New Zealand oceanographer.
- Blanche Hartman, 90, American Buddhist abbess.
- W. K. Hastings, 85, Canadian statistician.
- Doina Florica Ignat, 78, Romanian historian and politician, Senator (1992–1996).
- John Imbrie, 90, American paleoceanographer.
- Paul Jetton, 51, American football player (Cincinnati Bengals, New Orleans Saints).
- Irene Jordan, 97, American opera singer
- Lauri Kähkönen, 69, Finnish politician, MP for North Karelia (1999–2011).
- Rabbit Kekai, 95, American surfer.
- Jan Korger, 78, Czech medical doctor and politician, member of the House of Peoples of the Federal Assembly of Czechoslovakia (1992).
- Engelbert Kraus, 81, German footballer (Kickers Offenbach).
- Mikio Kudō, 55, Japanese baseball player, liver failure.
- Dick McAuliffe, 76, American baseball player (Detroit Tigers), World Series winner (1968), Alzheimer's disease.
- Howard Meeks, 83, American Episcopal prelate, Bishop of Western Michigan (1984–1988).
- Fredrik Norén, 75, Swedish jazz drummer.
- Pinuccio Sciola, 74, Italian sculptor and muralist.
- James M. Shuart, 85, American academic administrator, President of Hofstra University (1976–2001), heart disease.
- Hardev Singh, 62, Indian spiritual guru, traffic collision.
- Murray A. Straus, 89, American sociologist and professor (University of New Hampshire).

=== 14 ===
- Larry Barnes, 84, American football player.
- Tony Barrow, 80, British press officer (The Beatles).
- Balázs Birtalan, 46, Hungarian author, cancer.
- Gordon J. Booth, 84, American politician.
- Darwyn Cooke, 53, Canadian comic book artist (Catwoman, The Spirit, DC: The New Frontier), cancer.
- John Coyle, 83, Scottish footballer (Dundee United).
- Ron Henry, 79, American baseball player (Minnesota Twins), cardiovascular and renal disease.
- Jesús Leguina, 73–74, Spanish jurist, justice of the Constitutional Court (1986–1992) and director of the Bank of Spain (1994–2001).
- Valerie Lush, 97, British actress.
- Jaroslav Malina, 78, Czech scenographer and painter, heart attack.
- Lasse Mårtenson, 81, Finnish singer ("Laiskotellen"), cerebral hemorrhage.
- Malachi Mitchell-Thomas, 20, English motorcycle racer, injuries sustained in race collision.
- Banza Mukalay, 63, Congolese politician, Minister of Culture (since 2014).
- Christy O'Connor Snr, 91, Irish golfer.
- Marjet Ockels, 72, Dutch politician, member of the House of Representatives (1991–1994).
- Kenneth Painter, 81, English archaeologist and curator.
- Johnny Seay, 75, American country music singer.
- Paul Smoker, 75, American jazz trumpeter.
- Monteagle Stearns, 91, American diplomat, Ambassador to Greece (1981–1985) and Ivory Coast (1976–1979).
- Charles R. Stelck, 98, Canadian geologist.
- Neculai Alexandru Ursu, 89, Romanian linguist, philologist and literary historian.
- André Wicky, 87, Swiss racing driver and team owner.
- Alvise Zorzi, 93, Italian journalist and author.

=== 15 ===
- Hakkı Akansel, 92, Turkish military officer and politician, Mayor of Istanbul (1980–1981).
- Oya Aydoğan, 59, Turkish actress, model and television presenter, aortic aneurysm.
- Erika Berger, 76, German television presenter and author.
- André Brahic, 73, French astrophysicist, discovered rings of Neptune, cancer.
- Jelesko Grancharoff, 90, Bulgarian-Australian resistance fighter and anarchist
- Ghulam Sadiq Khan, 76, Indian classical vocalist.
- Robert C. T. Lee, 92, Chinese-born American veterinarian.
- Jane Little, 87, American musician (Atlanta Symphony Orchestra).
- Clovis Maksoud, 89, American diplomat, Ambassador of the Arab League to the United Nations (1979–1990) and the United States (1979–1990), cerebral hemorrhage.
- Bobby McIlvenny, 89, Northern Irish footballer (Oldham Athletic).
- Cauby Peixoto, 85, Brazilian singer, pneumonia.
- Ken Ramos, 48, American baseball player (Houston Astros), suicide by gunshot.
- Michael Roberds, 52, Canadian actor (The New Addams Family, Elf, Hot Tub Time Machine).
- Marion Tournon-Branly, 91, French architect.

=== 16 ===
- Hussein Sheikh Abdirahman, 75, Somali politician, Minister of Defense (1989–1990). (death announced on this date)
- Sir Gavyn Arthur, 64, British judge, Lord Mayor of London (2002–2003).
- Moidele Bickel, 79, German costume designer (La Reine Margot).
- Anthony Bird, 85, British Anglican priest and academic.
- Ken Cameron, 74, Scottish trade union leader.
- Giovanni Coppa, 90, Italian Roman Catholic cardinal, Apostolic Nuncio (1979–2001).
- Camille DesRosiers, 87, Canadian-born Tuvaluan Roman Catholic prelate, Superior of Funafuti (1986–2010).
- Huguette Dreyfus, 87, French harpsichordist.
- Robert Louis Freeman Sr., 82, American politician, Lieutenant Governor of Louisiana (1980–1988).
- Romaldo Giurgola, 95, Italian-born American-Australian architect (Parliament House, Canberra).
- Aar de Goede, 87, Dutch politician, member of the House of Representatives (1967–1973), State Secretary of Finance (1973–1977), member of the European Parliament (1979–1984).
- Mitsuo Horiuchi, 86, Japanese politician.
- Sadek Khan, 82, Bangladeshi journalist and filmmaker.
- François Maistre, 91, French actor (Angélique, Marquise des Anges, The Discreet Charm of the Bourgeoisie).
- Jim McMillian, 68, American basketball player (Los Angeles Lakers, Buffalo Braves, New York Knicks), NBA champion (1972), complications from heart failure.
- Julia Meade, 90, American actress (The Ed Sullivan Show, Pillow Talk).
- Gillian Mears, 51, Australian writer (Foal's Bread), multiple sclerosis.
- Emilio Navaira, 53, American country and Tejano singer (Life Is Good), heart failure.
- Noriko Nishimoto, 75, Japanese-born Australian puppeteer, cancer.
- Michael Pope, 89, British Olympic hurdler.
- Mamie Rallins, 74, American hurdler, traffic collision.
- David Rendel, 67, British politician, MP for Newbury (1993–2005), cancer.
- Bjarne Saltnes, 82, Norwegian politician.
- Ivaylo Sharankov, 82, Bulgarian Olympic swimmer.
- Deepak Shodhan, 87, Indian cricketer, lung cancer.
- Lino Toffolo, 81, Italian actor (Yuppi du, Brancaleone at the Crusades) and singer.
- Jack Unruh, 80, American commercial illustrator.
- Oscar Whitbread, 86, English-born Australian television producer.

=== 17 ===
- Seán Ardagh, 68, Irish politician, TD (1997–2011).
- Guy Clark, 74, American folk singer-songwriter ("Desperados Waiting for a Train", "Workbench Songs", "My Favorite Picture of You"), Grammy winner (2014), cancer.
- Benjamin de Roo, 76, Dutch-born Australian Olympic gymnast (1960, 1964).
- Vinjamuri Seetha Devi, Indian folk singer.
- Paulo Emilio, 80, Brazilian football manager.
- Lewis P. Fickett Jr., 89, American diplomat and politician.
- Kim Jae-soon, 92, South Korean politician, Speaker of the National Assembly (1988–1990).
- Ed Kolenovsky, 87, American photographer (Associated Press).
- Alexandru Lăpușan, 61, Romanian politician, mayor of Dej (1991), MP (1992–1994) and Minister of Agriculture (1992–1996).
- Edmund V. Ludwig, 87, American federal judge, member of the District Court for the E.D. of Pennsylvania (since 1985).
- Graham March, 91, Australian rules footballer (St Kilda).
- Yūko Mizutani, 51, Japanese voice actress (Digimon, Black Jack, Tenchi Muyo!), breast cancer.
- Bob Mulvihill, 92, American basketball player.
- Xavier de Planhol, 90, French geographer.
- Arthur Provis, 91, English cinematographer and producer.
- Müzahir Sille, 84, Turkish wrestler, Olympic champion (1960).
- Yuri Volkov, 79, Russian ice hockey player (Krylya Sovetov Moscow, HC Dynamo Moscow, national team).
- Evans Woollen III, 88, American architect.

=== 18 ===
- Elaine Abraham, 86, American Tlingit elder and nurse.
- Luis H. Álvarez, 96, Mexican industrialist and politician, President of the National Action Party (1987–1993).
- Ethel Bush, 100, British police officer.
- Eduardo Castrillo, 73, Filipino sculptor, cancer.
- Adrian Flowers, 89, British photographer.
- Astrid Gunnestad, 77, Norwegian journalist.
- Ida Pedanda Gede Made Gunung, 63, Indonesian Hindu priest.
- Reid Holiman, 88, American politician, complications from cancer.
- Zygmunt Kukla, 68, Polish footballer.
- Adán Nigaglioni Loyola, 86, Puerto Rican doctor and educator.
- Shigeki Mino, 84, Japanese Olympic modern pentathlete.
- Kornél Pajor, 92, Hungarian Olympic speed skater (1948), world champion (1949).
- Sutham Phanthusak, 69, Thai businessman and politician.
- Michael Reichmann, 71, Canadian photographer and blogger.
- Boris Schnaiderman, 99, Ukrainian-born Brazilian translator, writer and essayist.
- Donald W. Shea, 80, American major general and priest.
- Fritz Stern, 90, German-born American historian.
- Susan Tolchin, 75, American political scientist, ovarian cancer.
- Ian Watkin, 76, New Zealand actor (Braindead, Sleeping Dogs, Charlotte's Web).
- Doris Yankelewitz Berger, 82, Costa Rican artist and politician, First Lady (1982–1986).

=== 19 ===
- Alexandre Astruc, 92, French film critic and director.
- Irving Benson, 102, American actor and comedian.
- Roland A. Chicoine, 93, American politician.
- Cook, 15, Spanish Jack Russell Terrier dog actor (Aquí no hay quien viva, La que se avecina, TV commercials of Loterías y Apuestas del Estado), cardiac arrest.
- Ronald C. Davidson, 74, Canadian physicist, complications from pneumonia.
- Jan Deutsch, 80, American philosopher and legal scholar.
- George Forty, 88, British Army officer and author.
- Thomas L. Gilbert, 93, American physicist.
- Jim Ray Hart, 74, American baseball player (San Francisco Giants).
- Hugh Honour, 88, British art historian.
- Hu Hongwen, 91, Chinese organic chemist and academician (Chinese Academy of Sciences).
- Cindy Nicholas, 58, Canadian long-distance swimmer and politician, liver cancer.
- Rogelio Ordoñez, 75, Filipino author, liver cancer.
- N. S. Palanisamy, 75, Indian politician, complications from kidney failure.
- Laxminarayan Pandey, 88, Indian politician, member of the Lok Sabha for Mandsaur (1971–1979, 1989–2009).
- Marco Pannella, 86, Italian politician and civil rights activist, MEP (1979–2009).
- Morley Safer, 84, Canadian-born American journalist (60 Minutes), pneumonia.
- John Sisko, 57, American sculptor.
- Donald Snelgrove, 91, British Anglican clergyman, Bishop of Hull (1981–1994).
- Alan Young, 96, English-born Canadian-American actor (Mister Ed, The Time Machine, DuckTales).

=== 20 ===
- Gert Bals, 79, Dutch footballer (PSV, Ajax).
- Fred Bradley, 85, American politician.
- Glen Clegg, 82, Canadian politician.
- Patricia M. Derian, 86, American human rights activist, Alzheimer's disease.
- Vasile Duță, 60, Romanian lawyer and politician, Senator (2000–2004), lung cancer.
- John David Jackson, 91, Canadian physicist.
- Brandon Grove, 87, American diplomat, ambassador to East Germany and Zaire, cancer.
- Rosanna Huffman, 77, American actress (Babe, Oliver & Company, Murder, She Wrote), pancreatic cancer.
- Kang Sok-ju, 76, North Korean diplomat and politician, Foreign Minister (2007), esophageal cancer.
- Pranlal Kharsani, 89, Indian actor.
- Kho Jabing, 32, Malaysian convicted murderer, executed by hanging.
- Tsuyoshi Makino, 70, Japanese author, critic and social activist.
- Joe McDonagh, 62, Irish sports administrator, President of the Gaelic Athletic Association (1997–2000).
- Audrey Purton, 90, British Women's Royal Army Corps officer.
- Miguel de la Quadra-Salcedo, 84, Spanish journalist and athlete.
- Ádám Rajhona, 72, Hungarian actor.
- Sharon Riis, 68–69, Canadian author and screenwriter.
- Albert M. Sackett, 95, American Navy rear admiral.
- Yagya Datt Sharma, 80, Indian politician, member of the Madhya Pradesh Legislative Assembly.
- Robyn Sisman, 66, American-born British publisher and author.
- Gabriel Steblyuchenko, 75, Russian prelate, Archbishop of the Russian Orthodox Church.
- Lucille Stone, 90, American baseball player (All-American Girls Professional Baseball League), complications from hydrocephalus.
- Bogdan Ulmu, 65, Romanian theatre director, writer and publicist.
- Wheelock Whitney Jr., 89, American sports executive (Minnesota Twins, Minnesota North Stars, Minnesota Vikings).

=== 21 ===
- Gaston Berghmans, 90, Belgian comedian and actor (The Silent Hedonist).
- Lorne Clarke, 87, Canadian lawyer, Chief Justice of the Nova Scotia Supreme Court (1985–1998).
- Andrea Maria Erba, 86, Italian Roman Catholic prelate, Bishop of Velletri-Segni (1988–2006).
- Jane Fawcett, 95, British codebreaker at Bletchley Park during World War II, key figure in the sinking of the Bismarck.
- Sir Denys Henderson, 83, British businessman, chairman of ICI (1987–1995).
- Homeboykris, 9, American racehorse.
- Eddie Keizan, 71, South African racing driver.
- Tony Kriletich, 72, New Zealand rugby league player (Auckland, national team).
- Alan Lewis, 61, British footballer (Reading, Derby County, Peterborough United).
- Akhtar Mansour, c. 48, Afghan Islamist, Minister of the Emirate for Aviation and Tourism (1996–2001), leader of the Taliban (since 2015), airstrike.
- Nick Menza, 51, German-born American drummer (Megadeth), heart failure.
- Archie O'Leary, 86, Irish rugby union player and businessman.
- Germán Serrano Pinto, 76, Costa Rican politician, Vice President (1990–1994).
- Norman Tait, 75, Canadian First Nations artist, cancer.
- Sándor Tarics, 102, Hungarian water polo player, Olympic gold medalist (1936).

=== 22 ===
- Lucjan Avgustini, 52, Albanian Roman Catholic prelate, Bishop of Sapë (since 2006).
- Adolf Born, 85, Czech painter, illustrator, caricaturist and filmmaker.
- Malvina Cheek, 100, British war artist.
- Merv Cowan, 91, Australian WANFL footballer.
- Tom DeLeone, 65, American football player (Cleveland Browns, Cincinnati Bengals), brain cancer.
- Intikhab, 22, American racehorse, heart disease.
- DeAndre Kpana-Quamoh, 18, American track and field athlete, shot.
- John Lyons, 90, British trade union leader.
- José Luis Romo Martín, 62, Mexican artist.
- Alexis Navarro, 69, Venezuelan politician and diplomat, Governor of Nueva Esparta (2000–2004), Ambassador to Russia (2005–2008), heart attack.
- Yasushi Niki, 90, Japanese baseball player.
- Leonorilda Ochoa, 76, Mexican actress (Los Beverly de Peralvillo), Alzheimer's disease.
- Arulraj Rosli, 75, Malaysian Olympic racing cyclist (1964).
- Velimir Sombolac, 77, Serbian-Yugoslav football player, Olympic champion (1960) and manager.
- George Wildman, 88, American cartoonist.
- Bata Živojinović, 82, Serbian actor (Walter Defends Sarajevo), complications from gangrene.

=== 23 ===
- Kenneth E. Bailey, 85, American author and theologian.
- Nurjahan Begum, 90, Bangladeshi journalist.
- Jo Beverley, 68, British-born Canadian writer, cancer.
- John Brophy, 83, Canadian ice hockey player and coach (Birmingham Bulls, Toronto Maple Leafs, Hampton Roads Admirals), namesake of John Brophy Award.
- Joe Fleishaker, 62, American actor (Citizen Toxie: The Toxic Avenger IV, Late Show with David Letterman), heart attack.
- Vera Henriksen, 89, Norwegian writer.
- Cedric McKinnon, 48, American football player (Cleveland Thunderbolts, Tampa Bay Storm).
- Zdeněk Mézl, 81, Czech print-maker.
- Sir Reginald Palmer, 93, Grenadian politician, Governor-General (1992–1996).
- Nanette Rainone, 73, American feminist and reporter.
- Arne Sandnes, 92, Norwegian politician.

=== 24 ===
- Ray Ash, 79, Canadian football player (Winnipeg Blue Bombers).
- Donn Chappellet, 84, American vintner.
- Suzanne Corkin, 79, American neuroscientist, liver cancer.
- Adelina Dematti de Alaye, 88, Argentinian human rights activist, founder of the Mothers of the Plaza de Mayo.
- Khaleda Ekram, 65, Bangladeshi architect, non-Hodgkin's lymphoma.
- Marco Eneidi, 59, American jazz alto saxophonist.
- Lewis Fiander, 78, Australian actor (Pride and Prejudice, Who Can Kill a Child?, Bangkok Hilton), stroke.
- Maycie Herrington, 97, American historian and social worker.
- Buck Kartalian, 93, American actor (Planet of the Apes, Cool Hand Luke, The Rock).
- Nawabzada Raja Iqbal Mehdi Khan, 64, Pakistani politician, MP (since 2013), liver disease.
- Burt Kwouk, 85, British actor (The Pink Panther, Last of the Summer Wine, Goldfinger), cancer.
- Frankie Laine, 73, Canadian professional wrestler, multiple sclerosis.
- Mell Lazarus, 89, American cartoonist (Miss Peach, Momma).
- Toshiyuki Miyama, 94, Japanese clarinetist.
- Anne-Marie Nzié, 84, Cameroonian singer.
- Hughes Oliphant Old, 83, American theologian.
- Leo Proost, 82, Belgian racing cyclist.
- Jorma Salmi, 83, Finnish Olympic ice hockey player (1960), (Ilves, Frölunda HC).
- Berrick Saul, 91, British economist and academic administrator.
- Soita Shitanda, 56, Kenyan politician, MP from Malava (since 1997).
- Bé Udink, 90, Dutch politician and CEO.

=== 25 ===
- Giacomo Barabino, 88, Italian Roman Catholic prelate, Bishop of Ventimiglia-San Remo (1988–2004).
- Horacio Ernesto Benites Astoul, 82, Argentinian Roman Catholic prelate, Auxiliary Bishop of Buenos Aires (1999–2008).
- Cassandra Butts, 50, American lawyer.
- Lloyd Campbell, 101, Canadian curler.
- Nancy Dow, 79, American actress (The Ice House) and model.
- Ian Gibson, 73, Scottish footballer (Cardiff City, Coventry City, Middlesbrough).
- Gyula Kosice, 92, Slovak-born Argentine poet and sculptor.
- Ku Chin-shui, 56, Taiwanese Olympic decathlete (1984), plasma cell leukemia.
- Per Øien, 78, Norwegian flutist.
- Valentin Petry, 88, German racing cyclist.
- Edmondo Rabanser, 79, Italian Olympic field hockey player.
- Bob Sorenson, 92, New Zealand rugby union player and coach (Auckland), and cricketer (Auckland).
- Peggy Spencer, 95, British dancer.
- József Tempfli, 85, Romanian-Hungarian Roman Catholic prelate, Bishop of Oradea Mare (1990–2008).
- John Webster, 60, British theologian.
- Yang Jiang, 104, Chinese playwright, author, and translator.

=== 26 ===
- Kazimierz Barburski, 73, Polish fencer, Olympic bronze medalist (1968).
- Loris Francesco Capovilla, 100, Italian Roman Catholic cardinal, Prelate of Loreto (1971–1988).
- Esad Čolaković, 46, Macedonian footballer (FK Sloga Jugomagnat).
- Angelo D'Agostino, 53, American figure skater.
- Ted Dumitru, 76, Romanian football manager (Kaizer Chiefs, Mamelodi Sundowns, New York Apollo), heart attack.
- Steve Edwards, 85, American professor.
- Hedy Epstein, 91, German-born American Holocaust survivor and political activist (International Solidarity Movement), cancer.
- Lou Grasmick, 91, American baseball player (Philadelphia Phillies) and businessman.
- Noel Harding, 69, Canadian contemporary artist, heart failure.
- Iana Kasian, 30, Ukrainian prosecutor and murder victim.
- Robert O'Hearn, 94, American set designer.
- Gustav Meier, 86, Swiss-born American conductor, cancer.
- Wanaro N'Godrella, 66, French tennis player.
- Angela Paton, 86, American actress (Groundhog Day, American Wedding, Lolita), heart attack.
- Arturo Pomar, 84, Spanish chess grandmaster.
- Coe Swobe, 87, American politician, member of the Nevada Senate (1966–1974).
- Elmer W. Teague, 92, American politician.
- Bob Williams, 86, American football player (Chicago Bears).

=== 27 ===
- Chen Nengkuan, 93, Chinese metal and detonation physicist and academician (Chinese Academy of Sciences).
- Hal Collins, 89, American football coach.
- Michael Dann, 94, American television executive (CBS).
- Jean-Claude Decaux, 78, French billionaire advertiser, CEO of JCDecaux.
- Louise Erickson, 86, American baseball player (Racine Belles, Rockford Peaches).
- Gaylord T. Gunhus, 76, American army officer, Chief of Chaplains of the United States Army (1999–2003).
- Gerhard Harpers, 88, German footballer (Sodingen, national team).
- Kai G. Henriksen, 60, Norwegian businessman (Vinmonopolet).
- R. G. Jadhav, 83, Indian literary critic.
- František Jakubec, 60, Czech football player.
- Marshall "Rock" Jones, 75, American bass player (Ohio Players).
- George Klir, 84, Czech computer scientist.
- Bonnie Law, 47, Hong Kong singer and actress (Happy Ghost), heart attack.
- Leroidesanimaux, 15, Brazilian-born American racehorse, Eclipse Award winner, complications from accident.
- Petro Herkulan Malchuk, 50, Moldovan-born Ukrainian Roman Catholic prelate, Archbishop of Kyiv-Zhytomyr (since 2011), heart attack.
- Jaap Metz, 74, Dutch politician, member of the House of Representatives (1982–1986).
- Frank Modell, 98, American cartoonist (The New Yorker).
- Henrietta Phipps, 84, British landscape gardener.
- La Ferne Price, 90, American ballplayer (All-American Girls Professional Baseball League).
- Girolamo Prigione, 94, Italian Roman Catholic prelate, Apostolic Nuncio (1968–1997).
- Ivor Robinson, 92, British-born American physicist.
- Rocco Sollecito, 67, Italian-born Canadian gangster (Rizzuto crime family), shot.
- Wang Shizhen, 100, Chinese nuclear medicine physician and academician (Chinese Academy of Sciences), Father of Chinese nuclear medicine.
- Wang You-theng, 89, Taiwanese entrepreneur (Rebar), traffic collision.
- Morton White, 99, American philosopher and historian.

=== 28 ===
- Giorgio Albertazzi, 92, Italian actor (Last Year at Marienbad) and film director.
- Irby Brown, 88, American painter.
- Stanley Burke, 93, Canadian television journalist (The National News).
- David Cañada, 41, Spanish cyclist, race collision.
- James Crase, 78, American politician.
- Alexander DeConde, 95, American historian.
- Bryce Dejean-Jones, 23, American basketball player (New Orleans Pelicans), shot.
- Peter DeTroy, 68, American attorney, heart attack.
- M. Brendan Fleming, 90, American politician, Mayor of Lowell, Massachusetts (1982–1984).
- Don Graham, 72, American racing driver.
- John Willison Green, 89, Canadian journalist.
- Harambe, 17, American-bred western lowland gorilla, shot.
- C. Michael Harper, 88, American executive (ConAgra Foods).
- Christian Kay, 76, British lexicographer.
- Joanneke Kruijsen, 47, Dutch politician, member of the House of Representatives (2003–2006).
- Marion Lambert, 73, Belgian-born Swiss art collector, injuries sustained in traffic collision.
- Jacques Mamounoubala, 63, Congolese footballer (CARA Brazzaville, national team).
- Michael McCurdy, 74, American illustrator and publisher.
- Patrick Neill, Baron Neill of Bladen, 89, British barrister and life peer.
- Eddie O'Hara, 78, British politician, MP for Knowsley South (1990–2010).
- Wolf-Dieter Oschlies, 63, German Olympic rower.
- Floyd Robinson, 83, American country singer.
- Devarakonda Vittal Rao, 68, Indian politician.
- Niels Wamberg, 95, Danish Olympic rower.

=== 29 ===
- Kyoko Asakura, 90, Japanese sculptor, bowel obstruction.
- J. F. Chadband, 89, American politician.
- Sara Di Pietrantonio, 22, Italian murder victim, strangulation and arson.
- Kenne Fant, 93, Swedish actor, director and author, President of Svensk Filmindustri (1963–1980).
- T. Marshall Hahn, 89, American academic administrator, President of Virginia Tech (1962–1974).
- Nejiba Hamrouni, Tunisian journalist and trade union leader.
- Henryk Kempny, 82, Polish footballer.
- Ralph Ketner, 95, American businessman and philanthropist, co-founder of Food Lion, colon cancer.
- Svetozar Koljević, 85, Serbian author, historian, translator and professor.
- Mathew Mattam, 65, Indian Malayalam author.
- Don McNay, 57, American financial author.
- Edward Morris, 75, British art historian.
- K. P. Noorudeen, 76, Indian politician, cerebral hemorrhage.
- André Rousselet, 93, French businessman and politician, member of the National Assembly (1967–1968).
- David Tod Roy, 83, American sinologist and translator (Jin Ping Mei).

=== 30 ===
- Jan Aas, 72, Norwegian footballer (Fredrikstad).
- Gérson Bergher, 91, Brazilian politician.
- Boniface Choi Ki-san, 68, South Korean Roman Catholic prelate, Bishop of Incheon (since 2002).
- Raymond A. Harris, 89, American politician, chairman of the South Carolina Republican Party (1968–1971).
- Javaregowda, 100, Indian writer, heart failure.
- James Knepper, 84, American politician.
- Tom Lysiak, 63, Canadian ice hockey player (Atlanta Flames, Chicago Blackhawks), leukemia.
- Rick MacLeish, 66, Canadian ice hockey player (Philadelphia Flyers), meningitis and multiple organ failure.
- Kornél Marosvári, 72, Hungarian Olympic sport shooter.
- Erkin Vohidov, 79, Uzbek poet, playwright and translator.
- Donald M. Weisman, 91, American entomologist.

=== 31 ===
- Mohamed Abdelaziz, 68, Sahrawi politician, President (since 1976), lung cancer.
- Corry Brokken, 83, Dutch singer ("Net als toen"), Eurovision Song Contest 1957 winner.
- Jules Browde, 97, South African lawyer and human-rights activist.
- James Campbell, 81, English historian.
- Jan Crouch, 78, American televangelist and broadcasting executive (Trinity Broadcasting Network), complications from a stroke.
- Olav Djupvik, 85, Norwegian politician.
- Reshad Feild, 82, English mystic and musician (The Springfields).
- Sergio Adolfo Govi, 81, Italian Central African Roman Catholic prelate, Bishop of Bossangoa (1978–1995).
- Carl W. Hoffman, 96, American major general.
- Antonio Imbert Barrera, 95, Dominican politician, President (1965).
- Carla Lane, 87, English television writer (The Liver Birds, Butterflies, Bread).
- Gene Logsdon, 84, American farmer and author.
- Rupert Neudeck, 77, German journalist and humanitarian (Cap Anamur), complications from heart surgery.
- Peter Owen, 89, German-born British publisher.
- Rudra Madhab Ray, 78, Indian politician, kidney disease.
- Ghislaine Roquet, 90, Canadian nun and academic.
- Pam Royds, 91, British publisher.
- Jack Sing, 91, Australian rules footballer (Geelong).
- Vernon E. Wagner, 89, American politician.
- Aileen Ward, 97, American academic.
