= DeAndre =

- Gender: Male

Origin
- Origin: African-American
- Region of origin: United States

Other names
- Variant forms: Deandre, De'Andre, Deandre', Deaundre

DeAndre, Deandre, De'Andre or Deandre' is a given name. Notable people with the name include:

== Musicians ==
- DeAndre Brackensick (born 1994), an American singer from San Jose, California
- Soulja Boy (DeAndre Cortez Way; born 1990), an American rapper, record producer, actor, and entrepreneur

== Sportspeople ==
- Deandre Ayton (born 1998), Bahamian basketball player
- Deandre Baker (born 1997), American football player
- DeAndre Brown (born 1989), American football wide receiver who is currently a free agent
- Deandre' Eiland (born 1982), American football player
- D. J. Hackett (born 1981), American football wide receiver who is currently a free agent
- DeAndre Hopkins (born 1992), American football wide receiver for the Arizona Cardinals
- De'Andre Hunter (born 1997), American basketball player
- DeAndre Jordan (born 1988), American professional basketball center with the Los Angeles Clippers
- DeAndre Kane (born 1989), American basketball player in the Israeli Premier League and EuroLeague
- DeAndre Kpana-Quamoh (1998–2016), American track and field athlete
- DeAndre Lansdowne (born 1989), American basketballer
- Deandre Latimore (born 1985), professional boxer
- DeAndre Levy (born 1987), American football linebacker for the Detroit Lions
- D. D. Lewis (linebacker b. 1979), American football linebacker who is currently a free agent
- DeAndre Liggins (born 1988), American professional basketball player with the Oklahoma City Thunder
- DeAndre McDaniel (born 1987), American football safety who is currently a free agent
- DeAndre Moore Jr. (born 2004), American football wide receiver
- De'Andre Presley (born 1990), American football cornerback with the Miami Dolphins
- DeAndre Thompkins (born 1995), American football player
- DeAndre Wright (born 1986), American football cornerback who is currently a free agent
- DeAndre Yedlin (born 1993), American soccer player for FC Cincinnati.

== Others ==
- Deandre Brunston (died 2003), 24-year-old who was shot 22 times by Los Angeles County Sheriff's deputies
- DeAndre McCullough (b. 1977 - d. August 1, 2012), a drug dealer and addict whose life at age 15 in the drug trade is portrayed in The Corner, who played bit roles in that show and in The Wire, and who briefly worked behind the scenes for Treme

== See also ==
- D'Andre, given name
- Diondre, given name
- Andre, given name
