= Donn Chappellet =

American winemaker (1931–2016)

- Born: Cyril Donn Chappellet; September 11, 1931; Los Angeles, California, U.S.
- Died: May 24, 2016 (aged 84); St. Helena, California, U.S.
- Education: Pomona College
- Occupations: Businessman, Vintner
- Spouse: Molly

Cyril Donn Chappellet (September 11, 1931 – May 24, 2016) was an American vintner and businessman. He was the founder of the Chappellet Vineyard in Napa Valley, California.

== Biography ==
=== Early life and education ===
Chappellet was born on September 11, 1931, in Los Angeles, California. He graduated with a bachelor of arts in economics from Pomona College in 1954. As a student at Pomona College in the early 1950s, he developed an interest in Bordeaux wines, beginning a collection that would influence his future endeavors.

=== Early career ===
In 1955, following his education, Chappellet co-founded Interstate United Corporation, a food services company that employed 8,000 workers and was listed on the New York Stock Exchange. In 1966, at the age of 34, he sold his shares and relocated his family from Los Angeles to Napa Valley's Pritchard Hill.

=== Establishment of Chappellet Vineyards ===
In 1967, Chappellet founded Chappellet Vineyard on Pritchard Hill, becoming the second winery established in Napa Valley after Prohibition. Following the advice of winemaker André Tchelistcheff, he planted vineyards on the high-elevation slopes of Pritchard Hill. The initial development involved clearing the land of boulders, scrub, and forest.

Chappellet died on May 24, 2016, in St. Helena, California, at the age of 84.

=== Winemaking and legacy ===
Donn's wife, Molly, contributed to the winery's development, and their six children have been involved in its operations. Since 2013, his son Cyril has been serving as the company's chairman after Chappellet stepped down from the role.

Chappellet collaborated with winemakers, including Philip Togni, Tony Soter, Phillip Corallo-Titus, and Cathy Corison, to produce concentrated and age-worthy Cabernet Sauvignon wines. Following the establishment of Chappellet Winery, Pritchard Hill became a notable area in Napa Valley, home to wineries like Colgin Cellars, Continuum Estate, and Ovid. However, only the Chappellet family holds the right to use the Pritchard Hill designation on their labels.
