= Arikawa =

Arikawa (written 有川) is a Japanese surname. Notable people with the surname include:

- Hiro Arikawa (有川 浩; born 1972), Japanese writer
- Hiroshi Arikawa (有川 博; 1940–2011), Japanese actor and voice actor
- Rie Arikawa (有川 梨絵; born 1981), Japanese ice dancer
- Sadamasa Arikawa (有川 貞昌; 1925–2005), Japanese cinematographer
- Sadateru Arikawa (有川 定輝; 1930–2003), Japanese aikidoka
- Seiji Arikawa (有川 清次; 1929–2016), Japanese politician
