= Petronaitis =

Petronaitis is a Lithuanian surname. Notable people with the surname include:

- Stasys Petronaitis (1932–2016), Soviet and Lithuanian theater and cinema actor
- Vladas Petronaitis (1888–1941), Lithuanian army officer and lawyer, victim of Rainiai massacre
