= Sciola =

Sciola may refer to:

- Sciola, Iowa, a community in the United States
- Sciola (surname), a family name
