= Diondre =

Diondre is a masculine given name. Notable people with the name include:

- Diondre Borel, American football player
- Diondre Overton, American football player

== See also ==
- DeAndre, given name
- D'Andre, given name
