= Allan L. McCutcheon =

American sociologist and statistician

- Born: March 15, 1950
- Died: May 3, 2016 (aged 66); Lincoln, Nebraska, U.S.
- Education: Iowa State University (B.A.); University of Chicago (M.A., Ph.D.)
- Known for: Contributions to survey methods and latent class analysis
- Scientific career
- Fields: Statistics, sociology
- Workplaces: University of Delaware; University of Nebraska–Lincoln
- Website: scholar.google.com

Allan Lee McCutcheon (March 15, 1950 – May 3, 2016) was an American sociologist and statistician. He is best known for his work in survey research and methods, as well as for his contributions to categorical data analysis, especially to latent class analysis.

== Biography ==
McCutcheon studied sociology as an undergraduate at the Iowa State University, graduating in 1972, and continued his studies at the University of Chicago, earning an M.A. in 1977 and a Ph.D. in 1982. He taught at the University of Delaware from 1982 to 1996, first as an assistant professor, and since 1988 as an associate professor. He was a professor at the University of Nebraska–Lincoln from 1996 to 2015, first until 2005 at the Department of Sociology, and since 2003 at the Department of Statistics, as well as the Donald O. Clifton Chair of Survey Science. At UNL he founded graduate programs in survey research, as well as the Gallup Research Center, which he directed until 2004. Until his retirement in 2015 he also served as senior scientist at the Gallup Organization.

== Latent Class Analysis ==
McCutcheon's textbook Latent Class Analysis (Sage, 1987, ISBN 9780803927520) became the standard introductory text on the topic. He also co-edited with Jacques A. Hagenaars a highly cited volume Applied Latent Class Analysis (Cambridge University Press, 2002, ISBN 9780511065941).

== Exit polls ==
Since 2003, McCutcheon served in senior roles in exit-poll research at Edison Research, which supplied exit-poll data for the National Election Pool, a collaboration of networks including ABC, Associated Press, CBS, CNN, Fox News, and NBC.

== Works ==
- Kaminska, Olena, Allan L. McCutcheon, and Jaak Billiet. "Satisficing among reluctant respondents in a cross-national context." Public Opinion Quarterly 74.5 (2010): 956–984.
- Clarke, Harold D., and Allan L. McCutcheon. "The dynamics of party identification reconsidered." Public Opinion Quarterly (2009): nfp051.
- Hagenaars, Jacques A., and Allan L. McCutcheon, eds. Applied latent class analysis. Cambridge University Press, 2002. ISBN 9780511065941
- McCutcheon, Allan, and Colin Mills. "Categorical data analysis: log-linear and latent class models." Research Strategies in the Social Sciences: A Guide to New Approaches. Oxford University Press, Oxford (1998): 71–94.
- McCutcheon, Allan L. "A latent class analysis of tolerance for nonconformity in the American public." Public Opinion Quarterly 49.4 (1985): 474–488.
