= Sciola (surname) =

Sciola is a surname. Notable people with the surname include:

- Éder Sciola (born 1985), Brazilian football
- Pinuccio Sciola (1942–2016), Italian artist
- Sidnei Sciola (born 1986), Brazilian footballer
