= Palazzo di Amore =

House in Beverly Hills, California, United States

Coordinates: 34.106921°N 118.402446°W

- Interactive map of the Palazzo di Amore area

General information
- Type: Private residence
- Location: Beverly Hills, California, 9505 Lania Lane
- Renovated: 2014
- Client: Jeff Greene

Technical details
- Floor area: 28,122

Design and construction
- Architect: Bob Ray Offenhauser

Palazzo di Amore is a house in Beverly Hills, California. In November 2014, it was cited as being the most expensive residential complex in the United States, listed at $195 million, with 53,000 square feet (4,900 m^{2}) of living space. The compound is being sold by Jeff Greene, a real estate billionaire who purchased the property for around $35 million and spent the next several years renovating it with the help of developer Mohamed Hadid, architect Bob Ray Offenhauser, and designer Alberto Pinto. The property was relisted for sale in 2017 with an asking price of $129 million.

The completed house is 53,000 square feet (4,900 m^{2}), with 12 bedrooms including a 5,000-square-foot (460 m^{2}) master suite; 25 bathrooms; a 15,000-square-foot (1,400 m^{2}) entertainment center with bowling alley, 50-seat state-of-the-art movie theater, and discotheque; a 24-car garage; and 25 acres (10 ha) of grounds including a wine-producing vineyard, 150-person infinity pool, reflecting pool, and tennis court, parking for approximately 150 cars, guard house, private driver's quarters, guest house, wine cellar, spa, formal gardens and city-to-ocean views.

== See also ==
- List of largest houses in the United States
