= Diocese of Incheon =

Roman Catholic diocese in South Korea

Coordinates: 37.4500°N 126.7170°E

Diocese of Incheon Dioecesis Inchonensis 인천교구
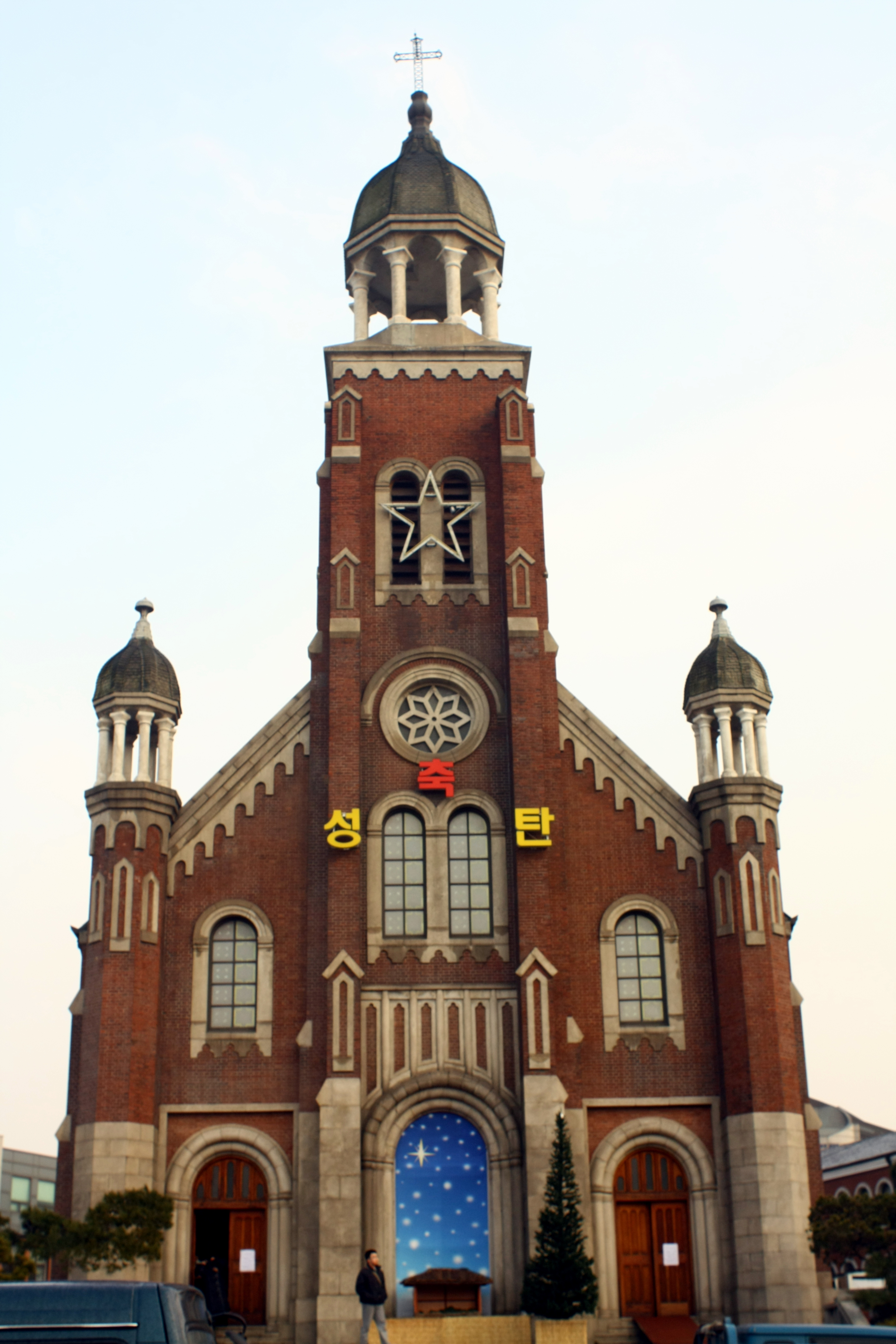
- Cathedral of St. Paul

Location
- Country: South Korea
- Territory: Incheon, part of Gyeonggi
- Ecclesiastical province: Seoul
- Metropolitan: Seoul

Statistics
- Area: 1,099 km^{2} (424 sq mi)
- Population: Total; Catholics: (as of 2017); 4,391,587; 521,690 (11.9%)
- Parishes: 128

Information
- Denomination: Catholic
- Sui iuris church: Latin Church
- Rite: Roman Rite
- Established: 6 June 1961 (65 years ago)
- Cathedral: Cathedral of St Paul in Incheon

Current leadership
- Pope: Leo XIV
- Bishop: John Baptist Jung Shin-chul
- Metropolitan Archbishop: Andrew Yeom Soo-jung

Map

Website
- caincheon.or.kr

The Roman Catholic Diocese of Incheon (Latin: Dioecesis Inchonensis) is a diocese of the Latin Church of the Catholic Church located in Incheon, South Korea. The diocese is suffragan to the Archdiocese of Seoul.

== History ==
On 6 June 1961 Pope John XXIII erected as an Apostolic Vicariate of Incheon. It was elevated to a diocese the next year on 10 March. The seat is Dapdong Cathedral.

== Leadership ==
=== Ordinaries ===
==== Apostolic Vicars of Inch’on ====
- William John McNaughton, M.M. (1961–1962)

==== Bishops of Incheon ====
- William John McNaughton, M.M. (1962–2002)
- Boniface Choi Ki-San (2002–2016)
- John Baptist Jung Shin-chul (2016–present)

=== Coadjutor Bishops ===
- Boniface Choi Ki-San (1999–2002)

=== Auxiliary Bishops ===
- John Baptist Jung Shin-chul (2010–2016)
