= Cathy Corison =

American winemaker

- Born: San Jose, California
- Education: Pomona College; University of California, Davis
- Occupation: Winemaker
- Years active: 1978 - present
- Known for: Corison Winery
- Spouse: William Martin

Cathy Corison is an American winemaker, entrepreneur and consultant. She specializes in Cabernet Sauvignon. Corison was the San Francisco Chronicle Winemaker of the Year in 2011.

== Personal life and education ==
Cathy Corison grew up in Riverside, California. She studied biology at Pomona College and was on their men's diving team, because the school didn't have a women's team. In 1972, she signed up on a whim for an extracurricular wine appreciation class, while signing up people for her trampoline class. This class was the catalyst for garnering Corison's interest in winemaking. After graduation in 1975, she moved to Napa Valley in California. She received her Master's degree in Enology from University of California, Davis.

== Career ==
Upon moving to Napa, she started working in the tasting room at Sterling Vineyards and at a wine shop. During this time, she was getting her master's degree at the University of California, Davis. She was told by her professor that she would not get a job in Napa Valley because she was a woman. She tried to get a job at Freemark Abbey and was initially denied the job. Part of the reasons the owners gave was because she was too short and they believed she could not work in the wine cellar.

As part of a larger pattern of sexism in the wine industry at the time, many women worked in labs and weren't allowed to be winemakers. Corison decided against working in the lab and in 1978 she persevered, applied again, and became an intern at Freemark Abbey. She eventually became an assistant winemaker for the winery. She then was winemaker for Yverdon before joining Chappellet Vineyard - in 1980 - as head winemaker, working there for almost ten years. At Chappellet she was able to focus on developing her skills at creating Cabernet Sauvignon wines. She prefers wines with moderate alcohol content. Her winemaking is largely non-interventionist, with gentleness at every step.

=== Corison Winery ===
She founded her own winery, Corison Winery, in 1987, thus becoming the first woman winemaker/proprietor in the Napa Valley. The winery is located in St. Helena, California in a barn designed and orchestrated by Corison's husband, William Martin. Corison Winery makes Cabernet Sauvignon and Cabernet Franc, as well as a tiny amount of Gewürztraminer, Reisling and Rosé, and produces 3,000 cases a year. The winery makes a Kronos Vineyard Cabernet Sauvignon, a Sunbasket Vineyard Cabernet Sauvignon, and a Napa Valley Cabernet Sauvignon. The Kronos and Sunbasket are estate wines, made from CCOF certified organic grapes. The vineyards are mostly dry farmed. The Kronos grapes come from one of the oldest vineyards in Napa Valley, planted in 1971. The Napa Valley Cabernet comes from benchland between Rutherford and St. Helena in the Napa Valley. The Corazón Gewürztraminer comes from the Anderson Valley AVA.

=== Sustainability ===
From the beginning, sustainability has always been a core value at Corison, to produce world-class Cabernet Sauvignon with integrity. One of Cathy's founding principles was to minimize negative impacts on the environment. The winery and estate vineyards are Napa Green certified, and the estate vineyards are certified organic by CCOF. In 2025 the winery received the Golden Vines Sustainability Award, from Liquid Icons in London.

=== Awards and acknowledgements ===
- 2025, Liquid Icons, Golden Vines Sustainability Award
- 2011, San Francisco Chronicle Winemaker of the Year
