= D'Andre =

D'Andre is a masculine given name. Notable people with the name include:

- D'Andre Bishop (born 2002), Antiguan association football forward
- D'Andre Goodwin, American football wide receiver and assistant college football coach
- D'Andre Hill (born 1973), American track and field coach and athlete
- D'Andre Swift (born 1999), American football running back
- D'Andre Walker (born 1997), American football linebacker
- D'Andre Wood (born 1988), American football cornerback
- Jordon D'Andre Garrick (born 1998), Jamaican professional footballer
- Tarvaris D'Andre Jackson (1983–2020), American football quarterback

D'Andre (or d'André) is also a surname, but is much less common than the given name.

- Antoine Balthazar Joachim d'André (1759–1825), French royalist politician

== See also ==
- DeAndre, given name
- Diondre, given name
- Andre, given name
