= William John McNaughton =

Catholic bishop (1926–2020)

The Most Reverend William J. McNaughton, M.M.
- Bishop of Incheon
- Church: Catholic Church
- Appointed: June 6, 1961
- In office: March 10, 1962 – April 25, 2002
- Successor: Boniface Choi Ki-san (최기산 보니파시오)

Orders
- Ordination: June 13, 1953
- Consecration: August 24, 1961 by Richard Cushing

Personal details
- Born: December 7, 1926 Lawrence, Massachusetts, U.S.
- Died: February 3, 2020 (aged 93) Methuen, Massachusetts, U.S.
- Coat of arms

William John McNaughton, M.M. (Korean: 나길모 굴리엘모; RR: Nagilmo Guglielmo; December 7, 1926 – February 3, 2020) was an American-born Catholic missionary and bishop. As a member of the Catholic Foreign Mission Society of America (Maryknoll) he was assigned to missions in South Korea. He served as the first Bishop of Incheon from 1961 to 2002.

== Early life and education ==
William McNaughton was born in Lawrence, Massachusetts to William John and Ruth Irene (Howe) McNaughton, the oldest of five children. He was educated at Central Catholic High School in Lawrence and Maryknoll Seminary in Ossining, New York. He entered the novitiate for the Catholic Foreign Mission Society of America, or Maryknoll, and professed religious vows on August 30, 1949. McNaughton earned a Bachelor of Sacred Theology and a Licentiate in Religious Education from the Maryknoll Major Seminary. He was ordained a priest on June 13, 1953.

== Priesthood ==
After his ordination McNaughton studied the Korean language at Yale University. He was sent to Korea and was engaged in parish ministry in Chungbuk. He served on the College of Consultors in the Diocese of Cheongju. He served as the Vicar General of the same diocese from 1959 to 1960. Pope John XXIII named McNaughton the Titular Bishop of Thuburbo Minus and Vicar Apostolic of Incheon on June 6, 1961.

== Episcopacy ==
William McNaughton was consecrated a bishop on August 24, 1961, by Cardinal Richard Cushing of Boston in St. Mary's Church, Lawrence, Massachusetts. The principal co-consecrators were Bishops John Comber, M.M., the Maryknoll Superior General, and Petrus Canisius van Lierde, O.S.A., the Vicar General of the Vatican State. A year later on March 10, McNaughton was named the first bishop of the Diocese of Incheon. He attended all four sessions of the Second Vatican Council (1962-1965). In the Diocese of Incheon, McNaughton established schools, hospitals, homes for the sick and aged, and a major seminary. He was instrumental in establishing institutions and associations that ministered to the youth, workers, the poor, infants, and training lay leaders. From 1999 to 2000 a diocesan synod was held.

McNaughton held several positions in the Catholic Bishops' Conference of Korea. He served as the conference secretary from 1965 to 1981 and as the president of the Committee for Liturgy from 1965 to 1970. He was a member of the Ecumenical Committee from 1970 to 1973 and its president from 1973 to 1978. McNaughton served as president of the Committee for Catechesis from 1978 to 1984 and as a member of the Episcopal Commission for Clergy and Religious from 1978 to 2002. Pope John Paul II accepted Bishop McNaughton's resignation as Bishop of Incheon on April 25, 2002.

== Later life and death ==
McNaughton retired to his native United States. He resided with his sister Ruth in Methuen, Massachusetts. During his retirement, he assisted in the Archdiocese of Boston and gave talks on the Second Vatican Council. He died on February 3, 2020, in Methuen. At the time of his death, McNaughton was one of four bishops who had attended all four sessions of Vatican II. His funeral was celebrated in St. Theresa's Church (Our Lady of Good Counsel Parish), Methuen, and he was buried in St. Patrick Cemetery, Lowell, Massachusetts.
