= John Wright (British Army officer) =

Brigadier John A. Wright CBE (10 October 1940 – 4 May 2016) was a British Army officer and polo administrator.

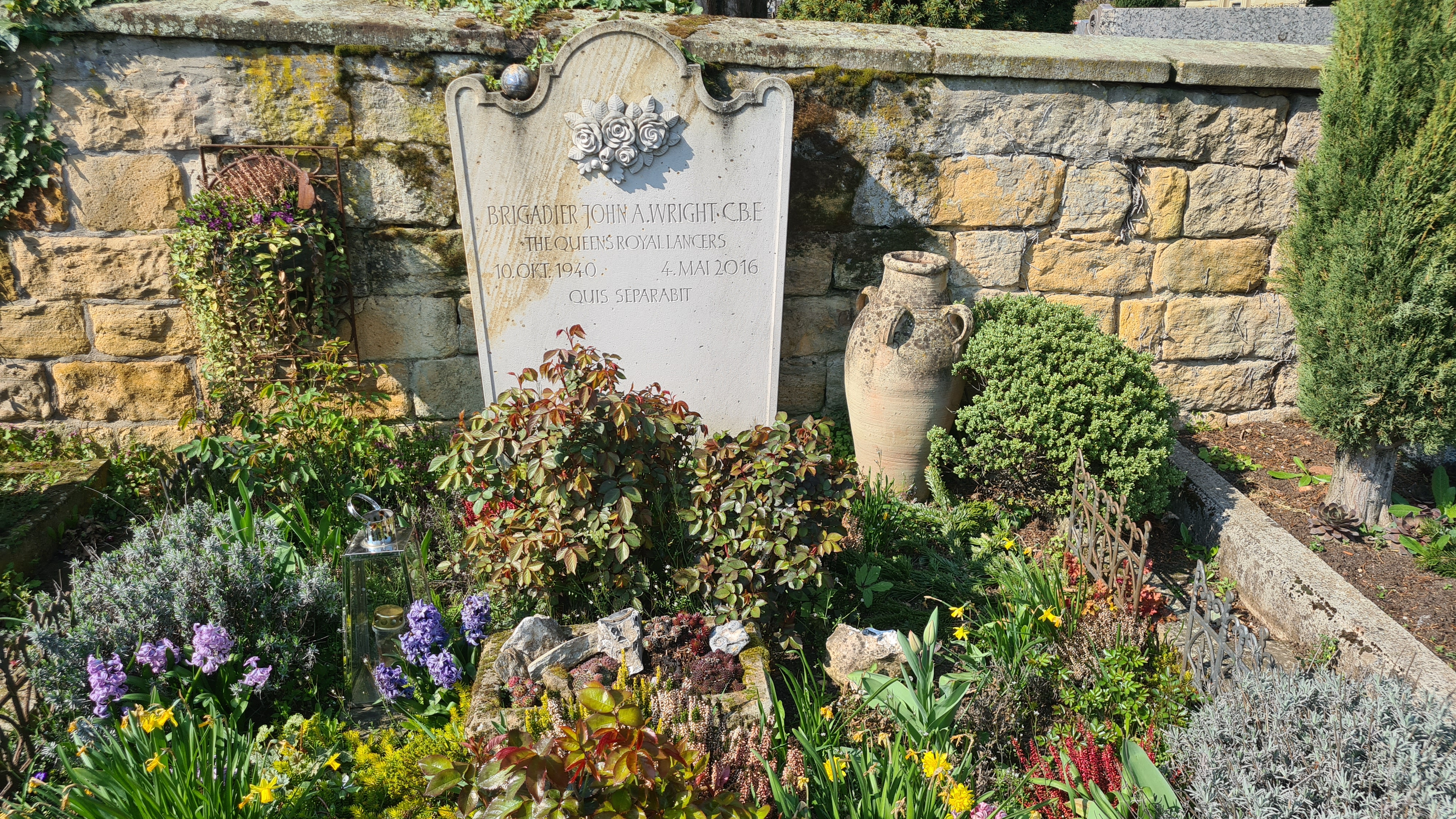
Tomb of John Wright at Gimmeldingen, Germany

Wright was born in Peshawar, British India (now Pakistan), the son of Thomas Wright, a colonel in the British Army, serving in India.
