= Pam Royds =

British publisher and children's book editor

Pamela Mary Royds (née Maycock; 17 August 1924 – 31 May 2016) was a British publisher and children's book editor.

== Early life ==
Royds was born in London, the daughter of Lilian (née Youngman) and Thomas Maycock, who ran a Smithfield Market import business. She was educated at Eothen School, Caterham, and St Hugh's College, Oxford.

== Career ==
In 1964, Royds joined the British publishing firm André Deutsch to stand in for the then editor, Philippa Pearce, while on maternity leave. The poet Michael Rosen credits Royds with "discovering" him, after being rejected by several other publishers.

== Personal life ==
In 1952, she married Alex Royds, an Eastern Daily Press journalist, and they had three daughters and a son together.
