= Ed Kolenovsky =

Edward Frank "Ed" Kolenovsky, Sr. (January 13, 1929 – May 17, 2016) was an American photojournalist and longtime photographer for the Associated Press, from 1948 to January 1992. Kolenovsky, who joined the AP in 1948 at their Dallas bureau, became the Associated Press' first full-time Houston-based photographer in 1959. He covered the space program at the Johnson Space Center, Hurricane Carla in 1961, and the Space Shuttle Challenger disaster in 1986.

Kolenovsky died from complications of dementia and Parkinson's disease at the home of his son and daughter-in-law in the Houston area on May 17, 2016, at the age of 87.
