= Gordon J. Booth =

American politician (1931–2016)

Member of the Vermont House of Representatives
- In office 1979–1996

Personal details
- Born: November 22, 1931 South Barre, Vermont, U.S.
- Died: May 14, 2016 (aged 84)

Gordon J. Booth (November 22, 1931 – May 14, 2016) was an American politician. He served as a member of the Vermont House of Representatives.

== Life and career ==
Booth was born in South Barre, Vermont. He was a dairy farmer.

Booth served in the Vermont House of Representatives from 1979 to 1996.

Booth died on May 14, 2016, at the age of 84.
