= Ghislaine Roquet =

Ghislaine Roquet, CC (1926 – May 31, 2016) was a philosophy professor and a nun with the Sœurs de Sainte-Croix community in Quebec. She was appointed a Companion of the Order of Canada in 1970 for her educational work.

She is a signatory to the Parent Report which has influenced education in Quebec since its release in 1963.

She died on May 31, 2016, in Montreal, Quebec.
