= Chappellet Vineyard =

American winery in Napa Valley, California, US

Coordinates: 38.482010°N 122.335431°W

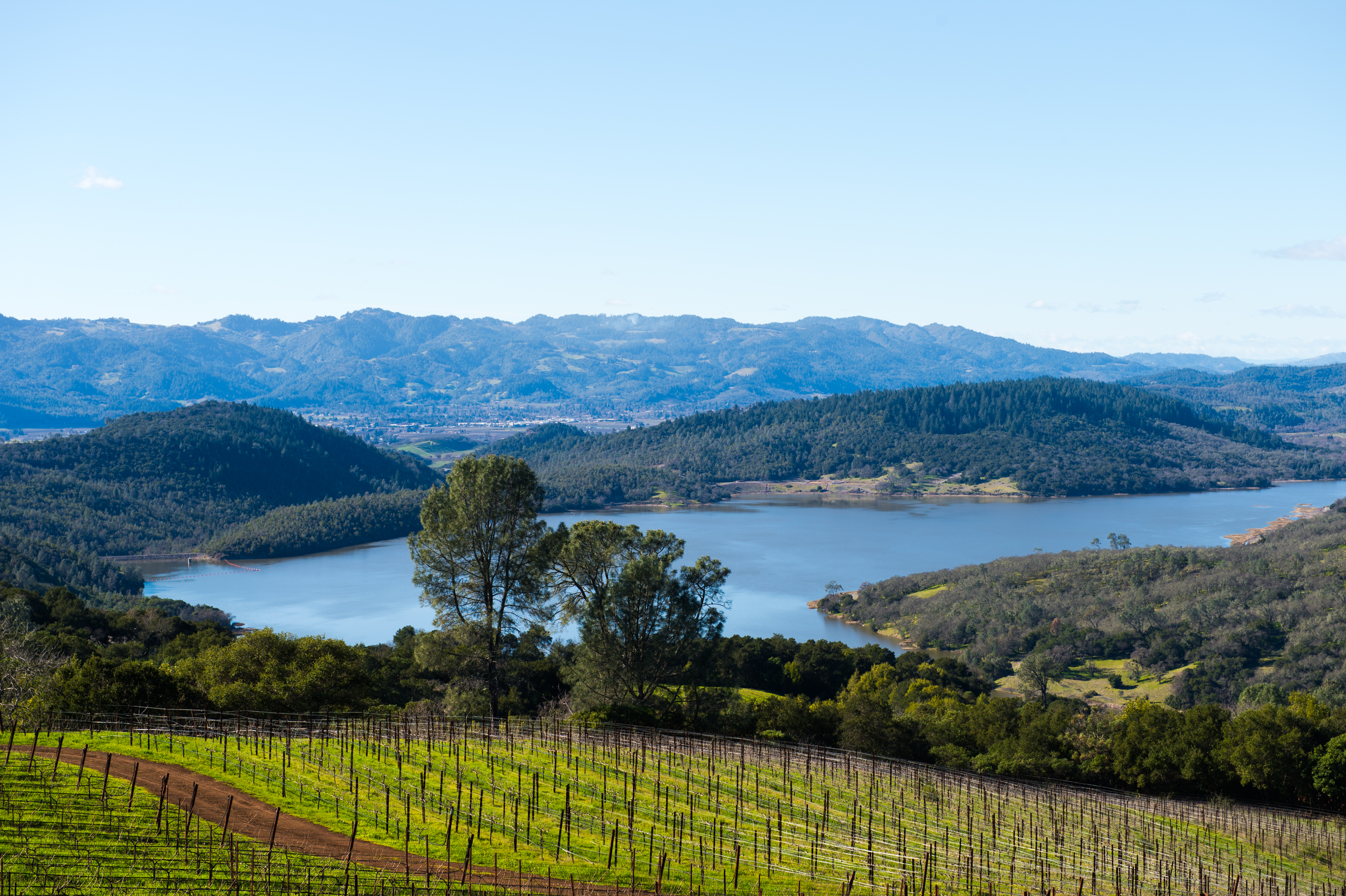
- Company type: Private
- Industry: Beverage
- Founded: 1967; 59 years ago
- Headquarters: St. Helena, Napa Valley, California, U.S.
- Key people: Donn Chappellet (co-founder), Molly Chappellet (co-founder), Cyril Chappellet (CEO, chairman), Phillip Corallo-Titus (winemaker)
- Website: chappellet.com

Chappellet Vineyard is an American family-owned winery located on Pritchard Hill in Napa Valley, California. Established in 1967, the company was one of the pioneering post-prohibition wineries in the region and has contributed to the development of Napa Valley's wine industry.

== History ==
Chappellet Vineyard was founded by the couple Donn and Molly Chappellet in 1967. Previously, in 1966, Donn Chappellet sold his shares in Interstate United Corporation and relocated his family from Los Angeles to Pritchard Hill. In the following year, along with his wife, Molly, he established Chappellet Vineyard, which became the first winery to plant vineyards exclusively on high-elevation hillsides in Napa Valley when the government lifted the prohibition of the wineries in the region. The couple's early settlement to hillside cultivation set a precedent for future wineries in the region.

In 1969, Chappellet Vineyard launched its first commercial Cabernet Sauvignon, which became a standard for mountain-grown wines in Napa Valley. It was produced under the direction of the winemaker Phillip Togni and is compared to Bordeaux wines such as Château Latour.

Chappellet's vineyards are located on Pritchard Hill, an area known for well-drained soils and microclimates suited to viticulture. The winery follows sustainable and organic farming practices. Phillip Corallo-Titus has been the winemaker for the company since 1990, and he has introduced modern fermentation techniques, including small fermentation tanks, to improve quality control.

While Cabernet Sauvignon is its flagship varietal wine, Chappellet also produces other wines such as Malbec, Cabernet Franc, Zinfandel, Chardonnay, and Chenin Blanc. Its Pritchard Hill Cabernet Sauvignon has received several critical acclaims. The company's estate also grows Chenin Blanc on a designated 3.5-acre plot.

The winery building, designed by Molly Chappellet and Ed Moses, has a pyramid shape that integrates with the landscape. In 2012, a barrel facility with a solar roof was added to the main building, generating power for the winery and contributing surplus energy to the grid.

In 2024, a five-liter bottle of 1969 Chappellet Cabernet Sauvignon sold for US $64,575 at Heritage's Fine & Rare Wine Signature Auction. This bottle was one of four produced, with the other three reserved for the Chappellet family. The previous owner, Napa Valley restaurateur Alex Dierkhising, purchased it for US $6,000 during the first Napa Valley Wine Auction in 1981. In the same auction, two magnums of the 1969 vintage sold for US $54,120 each, and a single bottle fetched US $17,220.
