= Graham March =

Australian rules footballer

Personal information
- Full name: Graham Henry March
- Born: 4 May 1925; Melbourne, Victoria
- Died: 17 May 2016 (aged 91); Seymour, Victoria
- Original team: Brunswick
- Height: 187 cm (6 ft 2 in)
- Weight: 83 kg (183 lb)

Playing career^{1}
Years	Club	Games (Goals)
1952	St Kilda	3 (1)
- ^{1} Playing statistics correct to the end of 1952.

Graham Henry March (4 May 1925 – 17 May 2016) was an Australian rules footballer who played with St Kilda in the Victorian Football League (VFL).

Prior to his football career, March served in the Australian Army during World War II.
