= John Sisko =

American sculptor

- Born: John Sisko; May 22, 1958; Montana
- Died: May 19, 2016 (aged 57)
- Education: Studio Practices with Tom Sherwood. Fine Art at Western Washington University. Philosophy at University of Washington.
- Known for: Bronze Sculpture
- Awards: Top Award, National Sculpture Society: Young Sculptors Best of Show, Sonoma Arts Guild Alex J. Ettl Grant HARC Foundation Grant

John Sisko (May 22, 1958 – May 19, 2016) was an American realist sculptor who lived and worked in Seattle in Washington State.

== Life ==
John Sisko spent his early years in Montana. At age 6, he was first exposed to great sculpture at the 1964 New York World's Fair where Michelangelo's Pietà was exhibited outside of Italy for the first time. Sisko moved to suburban Seattle at age 13, where he resided through high school. At the age of 20, he began study in the Fine Arts at Western Washington University where he met Tom Sherwood. Beginning in 1979, Sisko studied studio practices under Sherwood for the next eight years. During this time, Sisko also attended the University of Washington, graduating with a B.A. in philosophy in 1987.

John Sisko was a Fellow of the National Sculpture Society and served on the editorial board of Sculpture Review magazine. John Sisko has taught at Seattle University, Gage Academy in Seattle, and Brookgreen Gardens in South Carolina.

== Work ==
John Sisko was a contemporary American realist sculptor. He has made over 110 limited-edition bronzes, 16 commissioned projects, and has participated in over 45 exhibitions across the United States. His sculpture is characterized by a distinctive plainer or facetted modeling of the forms and intentionally distorting proportion characteristics (particularly hands and feet). In making his sculpture, Sisko works with themes of intellectual, spiritual, and philosophical depth.

== Public collections ==
- Archbishop Murphy High School, Seattle, Washington
- Bellevue Athletic Club, Bellevue, Washington
- Brookgreen Gardens, Pawleys Island, South Carolina
- Genzyme Corporation, Boston, Massachusetts
- Hedges Cellars, Issaquah, Washington
- Island County Courthouse, Coupeville, Washington
- KMS Inc., Seattle, Washington
- King County Library System, Issaquah, Washington
- Seattle University, Seattle, Washington
- Trillium Corporation, Bellingham, Washington
- University of Washington Medical Center (Hospital), Seattle, Washington
- Woodland Park Zoo, Zoomazium, Seattle Washington

== Citations ==
- Fine Art Connoisseur. July/August 2009. Volume 6, Issue 4. Artists Making Their Mark
- Made Men: Sculptors who revisit the classic male form in stone and bronze. John O’Hern. American Art Collector Magazine.
- Hexagon. Sculpture Review, Second Quarter.
- It is Good. Documentary by James Hupf.
- A Look at the 2008 Coker Master Sculptors. Brookgreen Journal. June 2008.
