= Jack Sing =

Australian rules footballer

Personal information
- Full name: John James Sing
- Born: 3 October 1924
- Died: 31 May 2016 (aged 91)
- Original team: Geelong West
- Height: 173 cm (5 ft 8 in)
- Weight: 70 kg (154 lb)

Playing career^{1}
Years	Club	Games (Goals)
1944–46	Geelong	33 (1)
- ^{1} Playing statistics correct to the end of 1946.

Jack Sing (3 October 1924 – 31 May 2016) was an Australian rules footballer who played with Geelong in the Victorian Football League (VFL).
