= Yasushi Niki =

Japanese baseball player (1925–2016)

- Outfielder
- Born: September 12, 1925; Osaka Prefecture
- Died: May 22, 2016 (aged 90)
- Batted: Left Threw: Left

NPB debut
- 1943, for the Hankyu

Last appearance
- 1949, for the Hankyu Braves

NPB statistics
- Batting average: .210
- Runs batted in: 22
- Stolen bases: 14
- Stats at Baseball Reference

Teams
- Hankyu (Braves) (1943; 1949); Asahi Baseball Club (1943–1944)

Yasushi Niki (仁木安, Niki Yasushi; September 12, 1925 – May 22, 2016) was a Japanese professional baseball outfielder. He played three seasons in Nippon Professional Baseball for Hankyu (Braves) and the Asahi Baseball Club. He died at the age of 90 in 2016.
