= Jaap Metz =

Dutch politician

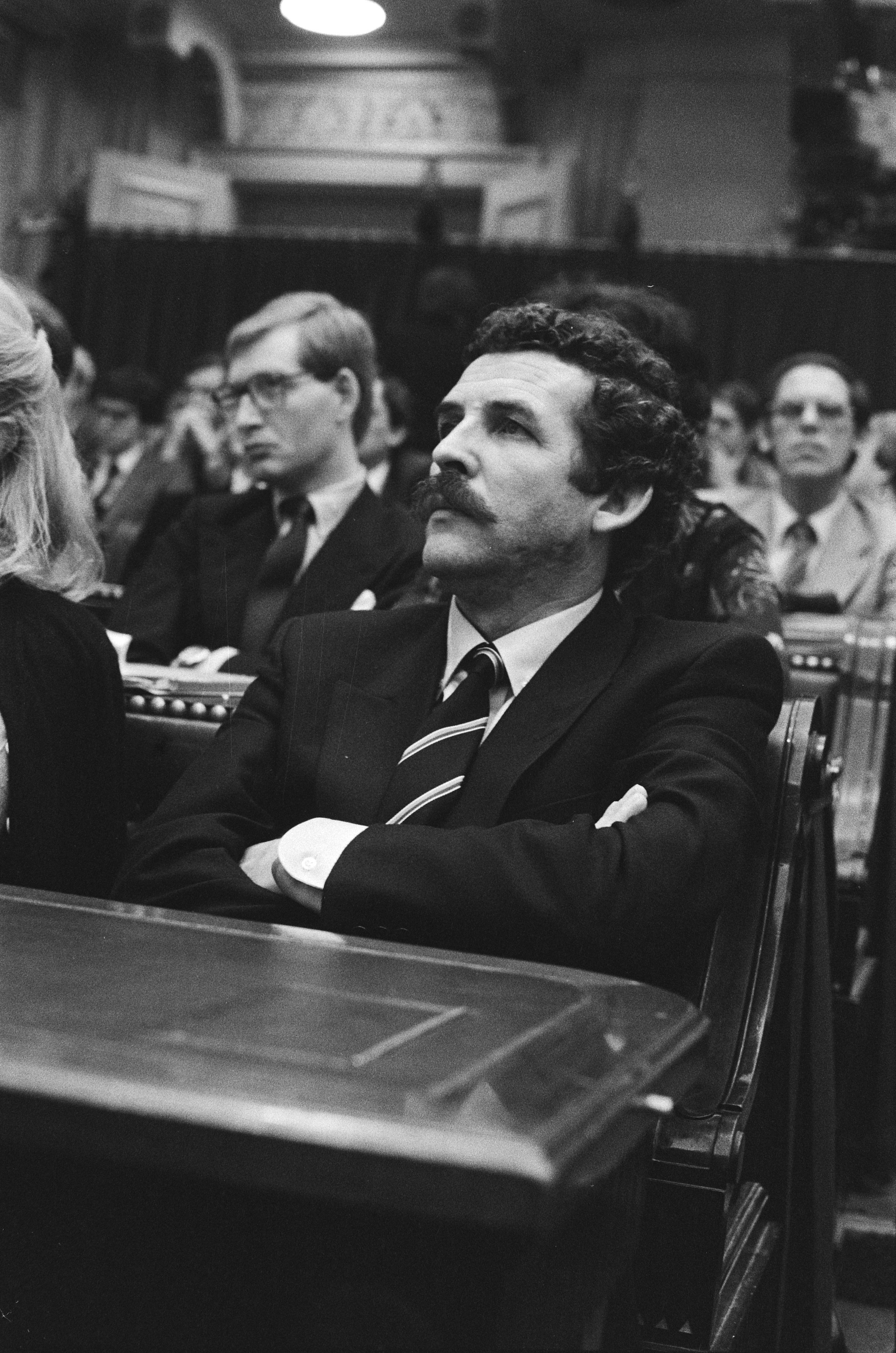
- Metz after being sworn into office in 1982

Member of the House of Representatives
- In office 22 November 1982 – 3 June 1986

Personal details
- Born: 6 August 1941 Amsterdam, Netherlands
- Died: 27 May 2016 (aged 74) Haarlem, Netherlands
- Party: People's Party for Freedom and Democracy

Jacob Jan "Jaap" Metz (6 August 1941 – 27 May 2016) was a Dutch politician. He was a member of the House of Representatives for the People's Party for Freedom and Democracy between 1982 and 1986. Before his time in office Metz was a journalist at De Telegraaf.

== Career ==
Metz was born on 6 August 1941 in Amsterdam. After completing his primary and secondary education in Amsterdam Metz started working for the newspaper De Telegraaf in 1962. He started as financial-economic editor and later also worked on police news. He had a three-year stint as journalist at Algemeen Handelsblad from 1969 to 1972 and then returned to De Telegraaf where he became head of the newsservice. Metz quit his job in 1982 and became politically active in the municipal council of Opmeer in September. On 22 November he also became member of the House of Representatives for the People's Party for Freedom and Democracy.

Shortly before being sworn in as a member of the House of Representatives information surfaced on paid advice Metz had given to a real estate company while working for De Telegraaf. Metz allegedly influenced information that was published on the company in the newspaper and came to blows with fellow journalist Peter R. de Vries. Party fraction leader Ed Nijpels accepted Metz' explanation that the advice given did not concern core business of the company. Several months later newspaper De Tijd claimed Nijpels had been blackmailed by Metz, so that the latter could keep his seat in the House. Metz pressed charges of slander, defamation and insult against the newspaper. The charges were dropped two years later.

Metz remained a backbencher throughout his term in office, which ended on 3 June 1986. He died in Haarlem on 27 May 2016, aged 74.
