= Paul A. Paddock =

American painter

Paul Andrew Paddock (June 2, 1974 – May 4, 2016) was an American painter and sculptor based in New York City. He is best known for his watercolors and works on paper. The style of his work is reminiscent of children's book illustrations, but it plays with ideas about sex and interpersonal relationships, innocence, transgression, sin, and violence. The work draws from American popular culture and from the artist's own experiences, dreams, and fantasies. He was represented by the BUIA gallery in New York City from 2004 to 2009 and by the Frosch and Portmann gallery from 2011 to 2016. He died on May 4, 2016, after a brief illness. He was 41 years old.

== Biography and career ==
Paddock grew up in Brewster, New York. In 1997, he graduated with a Bachelor of Fine Arts from the School of Visual Arts in New York City. After showing his work in numerous group exhibitions, he was granted his first solo show in 1998 at C.B. Space, a New York City artists' co-op. In 2001, at Brooklyn's Fish Tank Gallery, Paddock showed alongside artists Neil Farber, Martin Mull, and Taylor McKimens in the group show "Hello Schoolgirls!" After Schoolgirls, his work appeared in many other group shows, which led to his representation by the BUIA gallery. His work was a highlight of BUIA's group show Other Worlds. After his work appeared in another group exhibition at BUIA and in two group exhibitions at Capsule Gallery (New York, New York) that year—One for Grandma and Sympathetic Nerve—Paddock had his first solo show at BUIA, Piggy's New Gang, in October 2004. In 2005, he participated in the Tsunami Benefit Auction at Philips de Pury (New York, New York) and in the annual White Box auction. In 2006, Paddock's work was exhibited in Animals in Art at the Delaware Center of Contemporary Art in Wilmington, Delaware. In February 2007, Paul Paddock had another solo show at BUIA, Season of the Witch, which sold out in its first ten days. BUIA closed its doors in the spring of 2009. In 2011, Paddock was picked up by Lower East Side gallery Frosch and Portmann (New York, New York).

== Design work ==
Paddock was also an illustrator, graphic designer, and art director. Over the course of his career, he designed more than 300 books, sometimes using his artwork as cover art. Paddock also freelanced as an illustrator, designer, and art director for more than a dozen magazines. From 2007 to 2010, he was an art director at Andy Warhol's Interview magazine. His paintings have also been featured on record covers for bands such as the Pittsburgh-based punk band Dirty Faces and for The Honorary Title, on Anything Else But the Truth, lp (06/2004) and Scream and Light Up the Sky lp (08/2007).
