= Gaetan Boucher (ice hockey) =

Canadian-born Swiss ice hockey player

Gaétan Boucher
- Born: May 5, 1956; Princeville, PQ, CAN
- Died: May 4, 2016 (aged 59)
- Height: 5 ft 9 in (175 cm)
- Weight: 163 lb (74 kg; 11 st 9 lb)
- Position: Centre
- Shot: Left
- Played for: NLA; HC Sierre-Anniviers; EHC Biel; NLB; HC Villars; SC Bern; Genève-Servette HC; Lausanne HC; HC La Chaux-de-Fonds
- National team: Switzerland
- Playing career: 1972–2001

Gaétan Boucher (May 5, 1956 – May 4, 2016) was a Canadian-born Swiss ice hockey centre. He spent the majority of his career playing for HC Villars in Switzerland.

Boucher participated as a member of the Swiss national team three times, including the 1988 Winter Olympics.

== Career statistics ==
			Regular season					Playoffs
Season	Team	League	GP	G	A	Pts	PIM	GP	G	A	Pts	PIM
1972–73	Québec Remparts	QMJHL	10	0	0	0	2	2	1	0	1	0
1973–74	Québec Remparts	QMJHL	65	20	22	42	39	16	3	9	12	7
1974–75	Québec Remparts	QMJHL	61	49	48	97	44	6	4	8	12	2
1975–76	Québec Remparts	QMJHL	7	9	6	15	4	—	—	—	—	—
1975–76	Trois-Rivières Draveurs	QMJHL	47	32	43	75	38	9	2	4	6	4
1976–77	Villars HC	NLB	25	32	16	48	—	—	—	—	—	—
1977–78	Villars HC	NLB	26	36	29	65	—	—	—	—	—	—
1978–79	Villars HC	NLB	30	60	25	85	—	—	—	—	—	—
1979–80	Villars HC	NLB	33	60	39	99	—	—	—	—	—	—
1980–81	Villars HC	NLB	28	35	14	49	—	—	—	—	—	—
1981–82	Villars HC	NLB	38	37	30	67	—	—	—	—	—	—
1982–83	Villars HC	SwissDiv1	—	30	—	—	—	—	—	—	—	—
1983–84	Villars HC	NLB	42	34	37	71	—	—	—	—	—	—
1984–85	SC Bern	NLB	—	—	—	—	—	—	—	—	—	—
1985–86	Lausanne HC	NLB	28	31	18	49	80	—	—	—	—	—
1986–87	HC Sierre	NLA	36	29	20	49	18	—	—	—	—	—
1987–88	HC Sierre	NLA	32	10	7	17	40	—	—	—	—	—
1988–89	Genève-Servette HC	NLB	36	18	19	37	32	—	—	—	—	—
1989–90	EHC Biel-Bienne	NLA	31	18	17	35	24	6	2	2	4	12
1990–91	EHC Biel-Bienne	NLA	33	18	16	34	22	2	2	0	2	12
1991–92	EHC Biel-Bienne	NLA	26	9	10	19	14	4	2	4	6	4
1992–93	EHC Biel-Bienne	NLA	33	12	24	36	58	4	0	3	3	6
1993–94	EHC Biel-Bienne	NLA	33	4	6	10	26	—	—	—	—	—
1994–95	HC La Chaux-de-Fonds	NLB	36	12	24	36	32	4	0	3	3	18
1995–96	Villars HC	SwissDiv1	26	17	24	41	—	—	—	—	—	—
1996–97	Villars HC	SwissDiv1	28	18	19	37	—	—	3	—	—	—
1997–98	Villars HC	SwissDiv1	24	17	25	42	—	8	9	4	13	—
1998–99	Villars HC	SwissDiv1	28	22	23	45	—	2	0	1	1	—
1999–00	Villars HC	SwissDiv1	19	10	15	25	—	—	—	—	—	—
2000–01	Villars HC	SwissDiv1	24	16	18	34	—	—	—	—	—	—
2001–02	Villars HC	SwissDiv1	2	1	1	2	—	—	—	—	—	—
2002–03	Villars HC	SwissDiv1	13	1	8	9	—	—	—	—	—	—
2003–04	HC Sion	SwissDiv2	—	—	—	—	—	—	—	—	—	—
NLA totals			224	100	100	200	202	16	6	9	15	34
NLB totals			322	355	251	606	144	4	0	3	3	18
SwissDiv1 totals			164	132	133	265	—	10	12	5	17	—
