= Irby Brown =

American painter

Irby Brown (March 25, 1928 – May 28, 2016) was an American painter known for his paintings of the Southwest, particularly his snow scenes. Born in Paris, Texas, he studied under Olin H.Travis at the Dallas Art Institute for three and a half years. Brown sold his first landscape painting under commission at the age of 13 years old. He is represented by the Ventana Gallery in Santa Fe, New Mexico.
