= Rodrigo Espíndola =

Argentine footballer

Personal information
- Full name: Rodrigo Federico Espíndola
- Date of birth: 29 July 1989
- Place of birth: Monte Grande, Argentina
- Date of death: 13 May 2016 (aged 26)
- Place of death: Monte Grande, Argentina
- Height: 1.83 m (6 ft 0 in)
- Position: Defender

Senior career*
Years	Team	Apps	(Gls)
2009–2014	Chacarita Juniors	55	(1)
2013–2014	Racing Club	0	(0)
2014–2016	Nueva Chicago	21	(1)
Total		76	(2)
- * Club domestic league appearances and goals

Rodrigo Federico Espíndola (29 July 1989 – 13 May 2016) was an Argentine professional footballer who played for Chacarita Juniors, Racing Club, and Nueva Chicago as a defender. He died on 13 May 2016 after being shot during a robbery.
