= Zeno Fernández =

Mexican field hockey player (1940–2016)

Personal information
- Nationality: Mexican
- Born: 25 June 1940 Zanzibar, Tanzania
- Died: 7 May 2016 (aged 75)

Sport
- Sport: Field hockey

Zeno Fernández (25 June 1940 – 7 May 2016) was a Mexican field hockey player. He competed in the men's tournament at the 1968 Summer Olympics.
