= Gabriel Steblyuchenko =

Russian Orthodox bishop

Gabriel (1940 – May 20, 2016) was the Russian Orthodox bishop.
