= Tsuyoshi Makino =

Tsuyoshi Makino (牧野 剛, Makino Tsuyoshi, 24 September 1945 – 20 May 2016) was a Japanese author, critic, and social activist. He taught Japanese language at Kawai Juku in Sendai, Japan.

== Personal life ==
Tsuyoshi Makino was born 24 September 1945 in the city of Ena, Gifu Prefecture. After graduating from Ena public high school, he attended Nagoya University, where he received a degree in literature and Japanese history. After graduation, he worked as a high school teacher and a special education teacher for mentally handicapped students.

His book Thirty years after "Dismantling the University" (『30年後の「大学解体」』, Sanjuu nengo no 'daigaku kaitai') describes the 1968 general strikes in Japan.

Makino served for many years as juku lecturer in college preparation schools, travelling between Nagoya and Sendai in order to teach.

== Literary works ==
- Yobikou ni au (Fubaisha, 1986)
- Kunizakai wo koete – Touou minshuka to EC tougou no wakamono he no tabi (Kawai Shuppan, 1991)
- Saredo yobikou: yobikou kara "sekai" wo shiru (Fubaisha, 1999)
- Ronin shinaide naniga jinsei da! "Seikou suru roninsei" no sugoshi kata (Gakushu Kenkyusha, 1996)
- Kawai Juku Makino ryuu! Kokugo training (Kodansha, 2002)
- Sanjuu nen go no "daigaku taikai" (Weitsu, 2002)
- Gendai bun to kakuto suru (Kawai Shuppan, 2006)
- Hensachi houkai – honto no gakuryoku wo miushinau hensachi (kurabekko) no noroi (PHP Kenkyusho, 2009)
- Jinsei wo kaeru otona no tokusho jutsu (Mediax, 2009)
