= Paul Hofer (ice hockey) =

Swiss ice hockey player

- Born: 19 November 1928; Basel, Switzerland
- Died: 2 May 2016 (aged 87)
- Position: Defence
- National team: Switzerland
- Playing career: 1951–1958

Paul Hofer (19 November 1928 – 2 May 2016) was a Swiss ice hockey player who competed in the 1952 Winter Olympics and the 1956 Winter Olympics. In 1952, he participated with the Swiss ice hockey team in the Winter Olympics tournament. In 1956, he participated with the Swiss ice hockey team in the Winter Olympics tournament.
