= Sidney Brazier =

British army officer (1919–2016)

- Born: 8 December 1919; Rotherham, Yorkshire
- Died: 12 May 2016 (aged 96)
- Military career
- Allegiance: United Kingdom
- Branch: British Army
- Service years: 1946–1974
- Rank: Captain
- Unit: Royal Army Ordnance Corps
- Conflicts: Korean War; Cyprus Emergency; The Troubles
- Awards: George Medal; Mentioned in Despatches

Sidney Brazier, GM (8 December 1919 – 12 May 2016) was a British Army bomb disposal officer who won a George Medal for defusing sticky bombs when he was a conductor in the Royal Army Ordnance Corps in 1963.
