= Hugh Smith (American football) =

American football player (1934–2016)

No. 89, 92
- Position: Wide receiver

Personal information
- Born: August 27, 1934; Henryetta, Oklahoma
- Died: May 12, 2016 (aged 81); Indianapolis, Indiana
- Listed height: 6 ft 4 in (1.93 m)
- Listed weight: 220 lb (100 kg)

Career information
- College: Kansas

Career history
- 1962: Washington Redskins
- 1963: Edmonton Eskimos
- Stats at Pro Football Reference

Hugh Ben Smith (August 27, 1934 – May 12, 2016) was an American football wide receiver in the National Football League for the Washington Redskins. He played college football at the University of Kansas.
