= Vernon E. Wagner =

American politician (1926–2016)

Member of the North Dakota House of Representatives from the 32nd district
- In office 1963–1982

Personal details
- Born: June 13, 1926 Golden Valley, North Dakota
- Died: May 31, 2016 (aged 89) Bismarck, North Dakota
- Party: Republican
- Profession: pharmacist

Vernon Elmer Wagner (June 13, 1926 - May 31, 2016), was an American politician who was a member of the North Dakota House of Representatives. He represented the 32nd district from 1963 to 1983 as a member of the Republican party. He also served as Speaker of the House in 1979. He was an alumnus of North Dakota State University where he obtained a Bachelor of Science degree in pharmacy.
