= Hu Hongwen =

Chinese organic chemist (1925–2016)

Hu Hongwen 胡宏纹
- Born: 16 March 1925; Guang'an, Sichuan, China
- Died: 19 May 2016 (aged 91); Nanjing, Jiangsu, China
- Education: National Central University; Harbin Institute of Technology; Moscow State University
- Known for: Chief editor of Organic Chemistry
- Scientific career
- Fields: Organic chemistry

Hu Hongwen (Chinese: 胡宏纹; pinyin: Hú Hóngwén; 16 March 1925 – 19 May 2016) was a Chinese organic chemist, educator and an academician of the Chinese Academy of Sciences (CAS). He was known as the Chief editor of Chinese higher education textbook Organic Chemistry.

Hu died on 19 May 2016 at the age of 91 in Nanjing.
