= Bob Ray Offenhauser =

American architect

- Born: February 8, 1927
- Died: May 12, 2016
- Education: USC School of Architecture
- Occupation: Architect

Bob Ray Offenhauser (February 8, 1927 - May 12, 2016) was an American architect who designed mega-mansions with high ceilings. Palazzo di Amore, was the most expensive property on the market in the United States in 2014.
