= Majid al-Shibl =

Saudi Arabian presenter

Majid al-Shibl ماجد الشبل
- Born: Mohammed al-Shibil; 1935; Damascus, Syria
- Died: May 11, 2016 (aged 81); Riyadh, Saudi Arabia
- Occupation: Announcer
- Years active: 1970s–2000

Majid al-Shibl (1935 – May 11, 2016), original name Muhammad al-Shibil, was a prominent Saudi announcer who introduced several programs and variety.

== Illness ==
In 1999, Majid suffered a stroke, after treatment he returned to media work for a brief period before retiring in 2001.

== Death ==
He died on Wednesday, May 11, 2016 after a long illness at the age of 81 years.
