= Wang Shizhen (physician) =

- 王世真
- Born: 7 March 1916; Chiba, Japan
- Died: 27 May 2016 (aged 100); Beijing, China
- Education: Yenching University; Tsinghua University; University of Toronto; University of Iowa
- Known for: Father of Chinese nuclear medicine
- Scientific career
- Fields: Nuclear medicine Biochemistry

Wang Shizhen (Chinese: 王世真; pinyin: Wáng Shìzhēn; 7 March 1916 – 27 May 2016) was a Chinese nuclear medicine physician and academician of the Chinese Academy of Sciences (CAS). He was known as the father of Chinese nuclear medicine.

== Biography ==
Wang Shizhen was born in Chiba, Japan in 1916 to father Wang Xiaoxiang (Chinese: 王孝缃) and mother Lin Jianyan (Chinese: 林剑言), great-granddaughter of Chinese scholar and official Lin Zexu. His grandfather Wang Renkan (Chinese: 王仁堪) was the Zhuangyuan of the 3rd year of Guangxu (1877) imperial examination and his great-great-grandfather Wang Qingyun (Chinese: 王庆云) was the Viceroy of Liangguang in 1859. He returned to his hometown Fuzhou after his father finished his study in Japan.

Wang entered Yenching University at the age of 17 and transferred to Tsinghua University one year later. He received his bachelor's degree of chemistry in 1937. He became a lecturer at Guiyang Medical University after the Second Sino-Japanese War broke. He became the first Chinese to synthesize DDT during the war. Wang moved to Canada and entered University of Toronto for pharmacology in 1946. He transferred to University of Iowa half year later, majoring in chemistry. He worked for Institute of radioactivity of University of Iowa after his graduation.

Wang returned to China in 1951 and was assigned work at Peking Union Medical College. He built China's first isotope laboratory and developed the application techniques and methods of isotope treatment in China in 1956. He then became a nuclear medicine physician at Peking Union Medical College Hospital. Wang was elected as academician of Chinese Academy of Sciences in 1980.

Wang died on 27 May 2016 at the age of 100 in Beijing.
