= Colin Mills (sociologist) =

British academic sociologist

Colin Mills is an assistant professor in sociology at Nuffield College, University of Oxford. Mills has research interests in social inequality, social mobility, social demography, historical social mobility, and social measurement. He was editor in chief of the British Journal of Sociology from 2007 to 2008. Mills had previously served as associate editor of the journal for seven years until 2003, when Stephen Hill was chief editor.

== Selected publications ==
- Colin Mills (2014) 'Do adult obesity rates in England really vary by insecurity as well as by inequality?' BMJ Open
- Colin Mills (2014) 'Mapping Social Class in Britain', Sociology Review, 24, 2, 20–23
- John Hills, Mike Brewer, Stephen Jenkins, Ruth Lister, Ruth Lupton, Stephen Machin, Colin Mills, Tariq Modood, Teresa Ress and Sheila Riddell (2011) An anatomy of economic inequality in the UK: Report of the National Equality Panel
- Patrick McGovern, Stephen Hill, Colin Mills and Michael White (2007) Market, Class and Employment, Oxford University Press
- Colin Mills (2006) "Mobility" in John Scott (ed.) Sociology: The Key Concepts, Routledge
