= Ray Ash =

Canadian football player (1936–2016)

Profile
- Positions: Guard, Linebacker

Personal information
- Born: November 11, 1936; Timmins, Ontario, Canada
- Died: May 24, 2016 (aged 79); Winnipeg, Manitoba, Canada
- Listed height: 5 ft 11 in (1.80 m)
- Listed weight: 225 lb (102 kg)

Career history
- 1959: Saskatchewan Roughriders
- 1961–1964: Winnipeg Blue Bombers
- 1964–1965: Edmonton Eskimos

Awards and highlights
- Grey Cup champion (1961, 1962)

Raymond Bernard Ash (November 11, 1936 – May 24, 2016) was a Canadian professional football player who played for the Saskatchewan Roughriders, Winnipeg Blue Bombers and Edmonton Eskimos. He won the Grey Cup with Winnipeg in 1961 and 1962. He is a member of the Winnipeg High School Football Hall of Fame, inducted in 2008. Ash died in 2016 at the age of 79.
