= James Oyedeji =

Ghanaian sports historian

- Sports historian James Oyedeji
- Born: June 1953
- Died: 4 May 2016 (aged 63); Accra, Ghana
- Occupations: Historian; businessperson

James Oyedeji (June 1953 – 4 May 2016), nicknamed Uncle Bode or Uncle Bodey, was a Ghanaian sports historian, who was also the Chief Executive of the Tudu Mighty Jets.

== Biography ==
Oyedeji held a MSc in economics. He was primarily known as a sports historian, being nicknamed "Uncle Bode" or "Uncle Bodey" due to his extensive knowledge of West African sport, in particular football and boxing. He also worked as the Chief Executive of the Tudu Mighty Jets and Okwawu United.

== Death ==
Oyedeji died aged 63 on 4 June 2016 at 37 Military Hospital in Accra after suffering a stroke; he had previously been admitted to the hospital in 2015 with a heart problem. His death was marked with a one-week celebration.
