= Ondrej Binder =

Slovak politician (1970–2016)

Ondrej Binder (11 April 1970 – 13 May 2016) was a Slovak politician for the People's Party – Our Slovakia. He was elected in the 2016 election to the National Council of Slovakia. He served in this position until he died in a car crash several months later. He was born and died in Banská Štiavnica.
