= Anne van den Ban =

Dutch agricultural economist

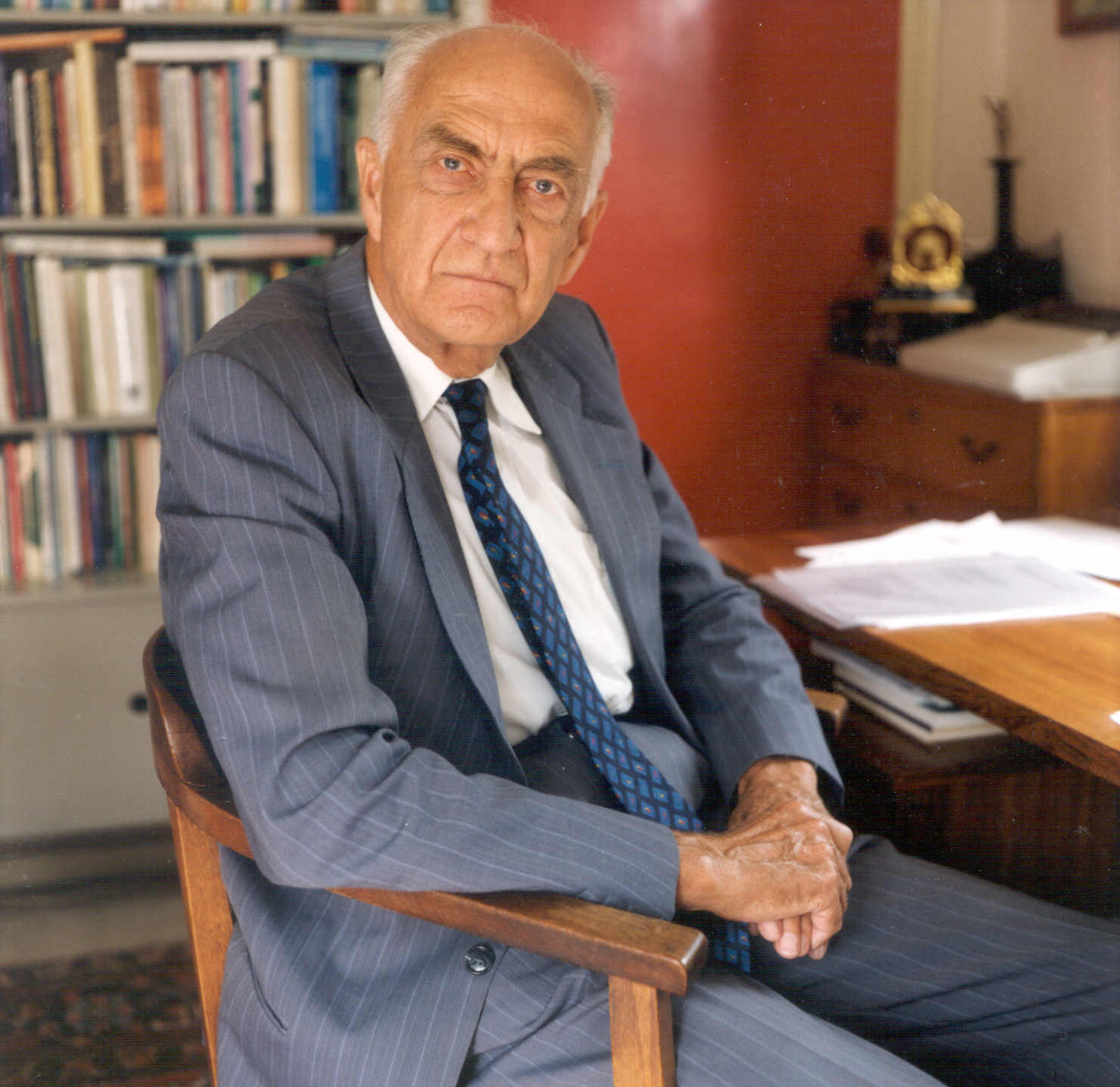
- Anne van den Ban in the 1980s
- Born: 28 February 1928; Leeuwarderadeel, Netherlands
- Died: 7 May 2016 (aged 88); Wageningen, Netherlands
- Awards: Officer of the Order of Orange-Nassau, INSEE Life Time Achievement Award

Academic background
- Education: Wageningen University
- Influences: Everett M. Rogers, E.W. Hofstee

Academic work
- Main interests: Agricultural extension
- Notable works: "Farmer and agricultural extension, the communication of new farming practices", "Agricultural Extension", "Health education and health promotion"
- Notable ideas: Adoption of innovations

Anne Willem van den Ban (Dutch pronunciation: [ˈɑnə ˈʋɪləɱ vɑn də(m) ˈbɑn]; 28 February 1928 – 7 May 2016) was a Dutch scholar, whose work focused on agricultural extension.

== Biography ==
Van den Ban (son of two extension agents) studied Agricultural Economics at the Landbouwhogeschool (agricultural university) in Wageningen between 1945 and 1953. The Landbouwhogeschool is currently known as Wageningen University (part of Wageningen University and Research Centre).

In an article that van den Ban wrote with Everett M. Rogers (from whom the diffusion of innovations theory originates), he describes how Professor E.W. Hofstee made a study-tour in 1950 of land-grant universities in the U.S. This study-tour was sponsored by the Marshall Plan. Hofstee had been impressed with the research on the adoption of new farm practices and when he returned to the landbouwhogeschool he stressed this topic in his lectures. Van den Ban, who was a student of Hofstee, chose the adoption of innovations as topic for his Master's thesis.

After completing military service, van den Ban started working for the Dutch Ministry of Agriculture, for which he did research on agricultural extension at the Department of Rural Sociology of the Landbouwhogeschool. Based on this research, van den Ban obtained his PhD in 1963 with Prof. E.W. Hofstee being his tutor. His thesis was called Boer en landbouwvoorlichting: de communicatie van nieuwe landbouwmethoden(Farmer and agricultural extension, the communication of new farming practices). His work is believed to be the first empirical study on agricultural extension in Europe.

In 1964 van den Ban started the department of Extension Education. At the time of his retirement, in 1983, the department had grown to be one of the 5 largest departments at the Landbouwhogeschool. Nowadays, this is the department of Communication Science with two sub-departments; Communication and Innovation Studies, and Communication Strategies. Although van den Ban retired from the department in 1983, he continued to work as a consultant in different countries, mainly in India and Tanzania.

Van den Ban is advisor to the Executive Council of the International Society for Extension Education (INSEE) and received a Life Time Achievement Award in September 2008 for his "outstanding contribution in the field of Extension Education, Agricultural Development and Rural Development" from this organization

Van den Ban was appointed an Officer of the Order of Orange-Nassau for his outstanding scientific achievements on a national and international level on 15 September 2011. The award was presented during a meeting to mark the award of the 200th scholarship by the Anne van den Ban Scholarship Fund.

== Publications ==
The work of van den Ban is well known throughout the world. In 1974 he published a book called Inleiding tot de voorlichtingskunde, which was (together with Helen Stuart Hawkins from Australia) revised, translated and published as Agricultural Extension in 1988. By now it has been translated in 10 different languages. Cees Leeuwis revised this book with contributions from van den Ban and it was published as Communication for rural innovation: rethinking agricultural extension in 2004.

Van den Ban did not limit his work to agricultural extension. With Maria Koelen he wrote a book on Health education and health promotion (2004). Different versions of this book were translated and published in 13 languages. On 28 February 2008 (van den Ban's 80th birthday) Wageningen University digitalized his life's work and made this publicly available through their website. Over 230 publications are offered in open access.

=== List of published books ===
- Koelen, M. A. and A. W. v. d. Ban (2004). Health Education and Health Promotion. Wageningen, Wageningen Academic Publishers.
- van den Ban, A. W. and H. S. Hawkins (1996). Agricultural extension. Oxford [etc.], Blackwell.
- van den Ban, A. W. and H. S. Hawkins (1988). Agricultural extension. Burnt Mill, Harlow, Longman.
- Ban, A. W. v. d. and W. Wehland (1983). Einfuehrung in die Beratung : fuer Agraringenieure, Entwicklungshelfer und Oekotrophologen sowie fuer alle in der Erwachsenenbildung und Oeffentlichkeitsarbeit Taetigen, Paul Parey, Hamburg en Berlin 1983.
- Ban, A. W. v. d. (1982). Inleiding tot de Voorlichtingskunde, Boom, Meppel, 1st edition 1974, 6th revised edition 1982, 294 pp.

=== Selected articles ===
- Ban, A.W. van den (1957). Some characteristics of progressive farmers in the Netherlands. Rural sociology. 22. - p. 205 - 212.
- Ban, A.W. van den (1960). Locality group differences in the adoption of new farm practices. Rural sociology 25. - p. 308 - 320.
- Rogers, E.M.; Ban, A.W. van den (1963). Research on the diffusion of agricultural innovations in the United States and the Netherlands. Sociologia ruralis 3 . - p. 38 - 51.

=== Editorship ===
- Ban, A. W. v. d. and R. K. Samanta (Eds.). (2006). Changing roles of agricultural extension in Asian nations. Delhi, B.R. Publishing Corporation.

== Anne van den Ban Scholarship Fund ==
In 1992, Anne van den Ban and G.J. Kerkhoven started a scholarship fund called Stichting Redelijk Studeren (which was translated as Sharing Responsibilities for Students). In 2005 the fund was renamed Anne van den Ban Scholarship Fund. The Anne van den Ban Scholarship Fund “...exists to enable promising students from developing countries to study at Wageningen University. The long-term goal is the training of talented experts who will go on to play leading roles in improving the agricultural production, rural development and environment in their own countries.” As of September 2011, the fund supports the 200th student at Wageningen University.
