= Steve Edwards (physicist) =

American physicist

Dr. Steve Edwards
- Born: June 16, 1930; Quincy, Florida
- Died: 27 May 2016 (aged 85); Tallahassee, Florida
- Education: Florida State University (BSc, MSc); Johns Hopkins University (PhD)
- Occupation: University professor
- Spouse: Helen (Carothers) Edwards

Steve Edwards was an American nuclear physicist and professor emeritus at Florida State University (FSU) in Tallahassee, Florida.

== Education ==
Edwards earned B.S. and M.Sc. degrees in physics from Florida State University in 1952 and 1954, respectively. In 1960, he completed his Ph.D. from Johns Hopkins University with the thesis "Exchange Effects in Direct Reactions".

== Career ==
Edwards returned to FSU in 1960 as an assistant professor of physics, rising to professor in 1969. He remained part of the faculty in the department of physics for more than 40 years. His research focused on theoretical nuclear physics and he helped establish the newly formed FSU nuclear physics group as one of the top programs in the nation. He wrote the physics textbook "Physics: A Discovery Approach." He served as department chair from 1973 to 1979.

Edwards served as faculty senate president from 1983-1985 until he was appointed dean of the faculties (1985) and added the title of deputy provost in 1986. He served in this position until his retirement in 2003.

Steve Edwards was a colleague of Paul Dirac, a Nobel Prize-winning research professor from Florida State University.

In 2003, Edwards was awarded the James D. Westcott Distinguished Service Award by Florida State University. He was the sixth person to receive this honor.

== Personal life ==
Steve Edwards was born June 16, 1930, and raised in Gadsden County, Florida. In 1965, he married Helen Carothers who was the daughter of Milton W. Carothers, Jr., former FSU administrator. They were married for 47 years, until her death in 2012, and had two daughters, Ashley Carothers Edwards and Leigh Holladay Edwards.

He died in his Tallahassee home on May 27, 2016.

== Publications ==
- Steve Edwards, "Exchange terms in direct nuclear reaction theories," Nuclear Physics 47 652 (1963) doi:10.1016/0029-5582(63)90911-8
- Hamza, Khidhir A. -A. and Edwards, Steve, "Coulomb Forces in the Three-Body Problem," Physical Review 181 1494-1502 (1969) doi:10.1103/PhysRev.181.1494

== Books ==
- Steve Edwards, Physics: A Discovery Approach, Wiley & Sons
