= Thomas L. Gilbert =

American scientist (1922–2016)

- Born: Thomas L. Gilbert; November 24, 1922; Topeka, Kansas, U.S.
- Died: May 19, 2016 (aged 93); Naperville, Illinois, U.S.
- Education: California Institute of Technology; Illinois Institute of Technology
- Known for: Landau–Lifshitz–Gilbert equation Adams–Gilbert equation
- Scientific career
- Fields: Physics
- Workplaces: Argonne National Laboratory; Lutheran School of Theology at Chicago
- Thesis: A Lagrangian formulation of the gyromagnetic equation of the magnetic field (1956)
- Doctoral advisor: Joesph M. Kelly

Thomas L. Gilbert (November 24, 1922 – May 19, 2016) was an American physicist, a specialist in statistical physics.

== Biography ==
Gilbert received his bachelor's degree from California Institute of Technology in 1944. He spend the later years (1944-1946) of the World War II at Armour Research Foundation working with Marvin Camras. In 1946, he married Winifred Watt and began graduate studies at the California Institute of Technology, but returned to the Armour Research Foundation in 1947 following the birth of his first daughter.

In the early 1950s, he collaborated with experimental physicist Joseph M. Kelly on a National Security Agency–sponsored project investigating anomalous damping in ferromagnetic materials. Theoretical work from this project led to a reformulation of the damping term in the Landau–Lifshitz equation, giving rise to the Landau–Lifshitz–Gilbert equation and formed the basis of his doctoral thesis in theoretical physics at the Illinois Institute of Technology (1956), though the thesis was never published. In 2004, based on Vladimir L. Safonov's request, Gilbert published this edited version of the thesis.

That same year, he joined the research staff at Argonne National Laboratory, where he worked until his retirement in 1987. His research focused on the electronic structure of atoms, small molecules, and crystal defects, and later (1979–1988) on the environmental risks associated with radioactive waste. Here, his principal contributions included the Adams–Gilbert equation for localized orbitals in polyatomic systems and the soft-sphere model of repulsive interactions between closed-shell atoms and ions.

Following retirement, he became Adjunct Professor of Religion and Science Studies at the Lutheran School of Theology at Chicago and Director of the Epic of Creation program at the Zygon Center for Religion and Science. In these roles, he developed educational programs to help seminary students engage with scientific knowledge and address the relationship between religion and science.
