= Colgin Cellars =

Winery in Napa Valley, California, US

Coordinates: 38.471816°N 122.348009°W

- Location: St. Helena, California, U.S.
- Founded: 1992
- Key people: Ann Colgin, Allison Tauziet
- Parent company: LVMH
- Known for: Tychson Hill Vineyard Cabernet Sauvignon, Cariad Napa Valley Red Wine, IX Estate Napa Valley Red Wine and IX Estate Syrah
- Varietals: Cabernet Sauvignon, Syrah
- Distribution: Mailing list only, select restaurants.
- Tasting: Not open to the public.
- Website: www.colgincellars.com

Colgin Cellars is a winery in Napa Valley, California, founded in 1992.

Since 1992, Colgin Cellars has embraced the ideal of crafting wines of harmony, grace, and precision from exceptional hillside vineyards in the heart of the Napa Valley. The combination of unique geology, mid-slope elevation, and cooling airflow, in concert with precision farming, establishes certain sites as the pinnacle of quality. From the release of their first vintage in 1995, the ethos of Colgin Cellars is to create wines of perfume, freshness, and minerality while embracing the diversity found in Napa’s hillside vineyards.

== Vineyards and wines ==
Herb Lamb: Placing great importance on hillside vineyards, Colgin Cellars began sourcing fruit from the Herb Lamb vineyard in the foothills of Howell Mountain, producing wines from this site from the 1992 to 2007 vintages. The “Herb Lamb” wine is consistently about charm and perfume, with notes of blue fruits and mint.

Tychson Hill: In 1996, the winery purchased a historic vineyard site, with origins dating back to 1860, to the north of the town of Saint Helena. Owned and farmed by Josephine Tychson in the 1880s, the first woman to build a winery in the Napa Valley, the vineyard was replanted with heritage clones of Cabernet Sauvignon and named in her honor. The site is currently planted with 6 acres (2.42 hectares) of vines. 2000 is the first vintage of Colgin Cellars’ “Tychson Hill” Cabernet Sauvignon, a wine celebrated for its ethereal qualities, as well as floral notes, and red fruit distinguishable in every vintage. Lisa Perrotti-Brown, formerly of The Wine Advocate, explained, “Tychson Hill blew my mind…this edifying beauty takes Napa Valley elegance and grace to a whole new level.”

Cariad: From the undulating western hillsides of Saint Helena, Colgin produces a wine called “Cariad” from the 1999 vintage onwards. The mineral-rich soil of the Cariad vineyard produces a strikingly classic Cabernet Sauvignon-based blend. Named for the Welsh word for love, “Cariad” is opulent and structured, characterized by exotic notes of violet, dark fruit, and a gravelly minerality. Robert M. Parker, Jr. described “Cariad” as, “an extraordinarily elegant, complex, yet authoritative example of a creative blend from some of the finest terroirs in all of Napa Valley.”

IX Estate: In 1998, Colgin Cellars purchased a 125-acre parcel in the Pritchard Hill area overlooking Lake Hennessey and named the property IX Estate (pronounced, "number nine estate"). Development of a 20-acre vineyard and the construction of a winery facility to house the production of all Colgin’s wines commenced. In 2002, the first vintages of “IX Estate” Red, a Cabernet Sauvignon-based blend, and “IX Estate” Syrah were produced.

== LVMH partnership ==
In 2017, Colgin Cellars became a strategic partner of the LVMH group. The only American wine label to be part of their Vins d’Exception Group, Colgin Cellars is included with Château Cheval Blanc, Château d’Yquem, and Domaine du Clos des Lambrays.

== In popular culture ==
As professional athletes have embraced the wine world, visits to Colgin’s winery at IX Estate by NBA players, such as LeBron James, Chris Paul, and Kevin Love, have been well documented.

Additionally, entertainers, like Ryan Seacrest and Kyle MacLachlan, have flocked to Colgin as an inspiration and benchmark in their understanding of the wine world.

Colgin Cellars has received the coveted rating of 100-points from The Wine Advocate for 21 wines since its founding in 1992. The uncommon story of Colgin Cellars achieving cult status has been detailed in the Wall Street Journal by Jay McInerney, the Financial Times, Robb Report, and numerous other publications.

== People ==
Ann Colgin, founder of Colgin Cellars, is an art collector and avid philanthropist, spending the first chapter of her career in the art auction world in New York, before becoming the Director of Sotheby’s West Coast Wine Department in the 1990s. Ann is on the board of both the Los Angeles County Museum of Art, where she’s assisted in adding over $30 million of art to the museum’s permanent collection, and the Centre Pompidou Foundation. She is also a founding vintner and Honorary Trustee of the Naples Winter Wine Festival, helping to bring in more than $191 million for at-risk and underprivileged children. Her husband, Joe Wender, began his career at Goldman Sachs in 1971 and continues to serve as an Advisory Director at the firm, while also involved in the winery and serving on various corporate boards and charities. The pair met in 1997 at a dinner celebrating the legendary vintner Henri Jayer.

Allison Tauziet serves as the Director of Winemaking at Colgin Cellars.
