= Nejiba Hamrouni =

Tunisian journalist (1967–2016)

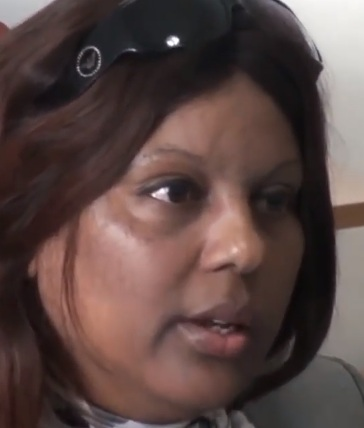
- Hamrouni in 2013
- Born: 10 May 1967
- Died: 29 May 2016 (aged 49); Tunis, Tunisia
- Occupations: Journalist and trade unionist
- Organization(s): International Federation of Journalists; National Syndicate of Tunisian Journalists (NSJT)
- Awards: Akademia Prize for Freedom of the Press (2013)

Nejiba Hamrouni (Arabic: نجيبة الحمروني, romanized: Najībah al-Ḥamrūnī; 10 May 1967–29 May 2016) was a Tunisian journalist and trade union leader. She advocated for the rights of journalists, promoted ethical journalism and democratic debate and campaigned for women’s rights.

== Biography ==
Hamrouni worked for the Arabic daily newspaper Assabah for eight years then as editor-in-chief of the magazine Cawtaryat, published by the Arab Center for the Study and Training of Women. She was also a correspondent for Jeune Afrique.

During the Tunisian elections in 2009, she was evicted by the police. She spoke to the international media stating that "members of the government and National Constituent Assembly are attacking journalists in order to intimidate them and devalue their work, and also to shut them up and repress them," and that "one cannot write or publish freely. Newspapers are regularly banned from publication, websites are blocked, journalists are harassed, prevented from working, wiretapped, arrested, brought to justice, sometimes physically mistreated."

In 2011, Hamrouni became president of the National Syndicate of Tunisian Journalists (NSJT), affiliated with the International Federation of Journalists, serving between until 2014. As president, Hamrouni supported the introduction of a self-regulatory framework for accountability within the NSJT. She was also consulted during UNESCO's 2012 study on media development in Tunisia.

In 2013, Hamrouni received the Akademia Prize for Freedom of the Press. The following year she was selected by Reporters without Borders (RSF) on World Press Freedom Day 2014 as among their "100 heroes of information."

Hamrouni died in Tunis in 2016.

== Legacy ==
The Nejiba Hamrouni Award for Journalism Ethics is awarded annually to a Maghreb journalist or media outlet by the Tunisian Association Vigilance for Democracy and the Civic State (Yakadha). Recent recipients have included Moroccan journalist Fatima Al Ifriqui (2018); Algerian news website Tour sur l'Algerie (2019); Tunisian independent collective blog Nawaat (2020), Moroccan newspaper editor Soulaimane Raissouni and Moroccan investigative journalist Omar Radi (2021); and the Algerian journalist Rabah Kareche (2022).

In August 2023, Hamrouni was featured on a Tunisian stamp.
