= Joan Helpern =

American shoe designer

- Born: Joan Evelyn Marshall; October 10, 1926
- Died: May 8, 2016 (aged 89); Manhattan, New York, U.S.
- Occupation: Shoe designer
- Known for: Joan & David Shoes

Joan Evelyn Helpern (née Marshall; October 10, 1926 – May 8, 2016) was an American shoe designer. She was the creative partner in the company Joan & David Shoes, with her husband, David Helpern.

== Early life ==
Joan Evelyn Marshall was born on October 10, 1926, in the Bronx. She attended and graduated from Hunter College in Manhattan, majoring in economics, psychology and English. She earned a master's degree in social psychology from Columbia University and a doctorate in psychology from Harvard University.

Joan and David Helpern married in 1960. Joan Helpern was studying at Harvard, and later became a child psychologist in the New York City school system. David Helpern worked in his family's clothing stores. After becoming acquainted with the offerings in women's shoes through her husband's business, she began a second career designing shoes. She worked first for a small Boston shoe company and also consulted with other shoe manufacturers.

== Joan & David ==
In 1967 Halpern and her husband decided to start their own shoe company. They specialized in high-fashion women's shoes, although their line also included handbags and other accessories. While the standard for a women's shoe was the high heel, Helpern stated that she was designing shoes for women who "run through airports". Their first pair of shoes were blue and white oxfords.

They had revenues of $100 million in 1986. In 2000, after five years of financial difficulties, the company sought bankruptcy protection and was sold to the Maxwell Shoe Company for $16.8 million.

== Death ==
Helpern died in Manhattan on May 8, 2016. David Helpern had died in 2012.
