= Jack Diamond (comedian) =

British comedian

Jack Diamond (Manchester, 12 August 1941 – 12 May 2016) was a British comedian, known for his work in clubs and theatres in northwest England. He was described as a "Blackpool favourite" by The Stage magazine and "a very funny man" by Bernard Manning.

== Early life ==
Jack was born in Manchester on 12 August 1941. He went to Nansen St Junior School and then to Ardwick Secondary Technical School. He passed the Town Hall exams and went to work as a junior clerk in the Education Department at the age of 15.

He went on holiday to Butlins in Filey at the age of 16 with a group of friends and was roped into the National Talent Contest where he sang "Ma she's making eyes at me". He was ad-libbing so much with the pianist that he won The Comedian Section and was awarded £10 and a free week's holiday.

== Career ==
From the age of 16 Jack started doing gigs at pubs and clubs. By the early Sixties he was well known on all club circuits up and down the country. He was warm-up comic for most of the "Comedian Shows" on TV. He then opened as star of his own revue in Blackpool at the Norbreck Hydro Hotel. It was a huge success and ran for two years.

Throughout the Seventies Jack opened a few clubs but was best suited to concentrating on his stage work. He began his own talent show, "Jack Diamonds Discouries”, which ran for 25 years in Blackpool. He later worked in Cleveleys, also on the Fylde coast. He made several TV appearances and also did a TV series "The Diana Dors Show". He was managed by Bryan Yorke Enterprises. Jack was rated as one of the finest ad-libbers in the country. Throughout his career he appeared with such names as Les Dawson, Eartha Kitt, Roy Orbison, The Walker Brothers, The Beatles and many more.

== Personal life ==
Jack married Marie Ashton of the "Roly Polys" in 1992 and retired because of health problems in 2004, moving to Southport where he died on 12 May 2016.
