= Stasys Petronaitis =

Soviet and Lithuanian actor

- Stasys Petronaitis in 1982
- Born: August 8, 1932; Plaučiškiai, Lithuania
- Died: May 2, 2016 (aged 83); Panevėžys, Lithuania
- Occupation: Actor
- Years active: 1951-2016

Stasys Petronaitis (August 8, 1932 – May 2, 2016) was a Soviet and Lithuanian actor of theater and cinema. Honored Artist of the Lithuanian SSR (1982).

In 1950-1951 he studied in the studio under the direction of Juozas Miltinis. He worked as an actor drama theater in the city of Panevėžys (in 1951–1973 years).

Many appeared in films, making his debut in 1953 in the movie Aušra prie Nemuno directed by Aleksandr Faintsimmer.

Wife — Regina Zdanavičiūtė (1925-2015), also an actress of theater and cinema; Honored Artist of the Lithuanian SSR (1974), People's Artist of the Lithuanian SSR (1985).
