= DeAndre Kpana-Quamoh =

American track and field athlete

Personal information
- Nationality: American
- Born: March 17, 1998 Nashville, Tennessee
- Died: May 22, 2016 (aged 18) Nashville, Tennessee

Sport
- Sport: Running
- Event: 300m hurdles

Achievements and titles
- Personal bests: 300m hurdles: 39.68 (2016) (Nashville, Tennessee) 1500m: 4:51.30 (2015) (Murfreesboro, Tennessee) Triple Jump: 43’ 0” (2016) (Clarksville, Tennessee)

DeAndre Tejan Kpana-Quamoh (March 17, 1998 – May 22, 2016) was a high school track and field star at East Nashville Magnet School. He qualified for the 2014, 2015, and 2016 TSSAA track state championships but was fatally shot five days prior to the 2016 state track meet, just days after his high school graduation.

== Early years ==
DeAndre Kpana-Quamoh was born on March 17, 1998, at Vanderbilt University Medical Center to Samuel Christopher Kpana-Quamoh and his wife Terrice (née Ramey). The family has roots in the African city of Freetown, Sierra Leone where relative Joseph Kpana-Quamoh attended Albert Academy before immigrating to America and earning degrees from Lipscomb University and Fisk University.

The Kpana-Quamohs became active Church of Christ members and Joseph even served as minister of two such congregations in Middle Tennessee, Scott Avenue Church and East Main Street at Arnold Lane Church. DeAndre attended East Nashville Magnet School where he participated in track and field, football, and wrestling. He joined Alpha Nu Theta fraternity and often spent time at the Margaret Maddox Family YMCA a mile and a half north of the school.

The family moved to Milton Drive in the Inglewood area, four miles from the school, where they befriended long-time neighbor and Grammy-nominated singer Will Hoge. To save up money DeAndre took a job at a Kroger supermarket located at 3410 Gallatin Pike down the street from his family's home.

== High school career ==
=== Sophomore season ===
On May 15, 2014, sophomore Kpana-Quamoh ran first leg on East Nashville's 4 × 400 m relay team that clocked a time of 3:25.03, breaking the Class A-AA Middle Tennessee Sectional record of 3:25.54 set in 1988 by Brentwood Academy. His teammates were Christian Washington (leg 2), Isaiah Olige (leg 3), and Melvin Wells (leg 4). On May 23, 2014, that same 4 × 400 m squad won the state championship at MTSU with the fifth-fastest time in Class A-AA history at 3:22.09. Olige went on to sign with Tennessee State University's track team in 2014.

=== Junior season ===
On April 28, 2015, junior Kpana-Quamoh competed at Lipscomb University in the Class A-AA Middle Tennessee Sectional decathlon for the first time, qualifying for the state championship where he would finish seventh overall. During the decathlon state finals on May 19 he ran the 1500m in 4:51.30, the fifth-fastest time in Class A-AA in 2015.

=== Senior season ===
Kpana-Quamoh was converted to a 300m hurdler in 2016, winning the gold medal in the state qualifying round on May 19 with a time of 39.68, edging his closest competitor by 0.22 seconds. It was the second-fastest 300m hurdle time in Class A-AA that season and one of the top 15 fastest times in classification history. Additionally his personal best triple jump of 43’ 0” (13.1 m) was among the top ten best marks in Class A-AA in 2016.

His success in the classroom earned him a full academic scholarship to Alabama State University where he planned to run track.

== Death ==
On Sunday, May 22, 2016, Kpana-Quamoh finished his evening shift at Kroger and traveled to a friend's home in the 2700 block of Hydes Ferry Road. While examining a gun presumed to be unloaded in one of the home's bedrooms, the firearm discharged. Officers were dispatched at 10:45 p.m. Kpana-Quamoh was transferred to Vanderbilt University Medical Center where he was pronounced dead, only three days after earning his 300m hurdle gold medal and qualifying for the state championship.

Kpana-Quamoh was the 21st adult accidentally shot and the eighth person accidentally killed by a gun in the state of Tennessee in 2016 (after no such deaths at that point in 2015).

During the TSSAA state championship at MTSU on May 27, 2016, prior to the Class A-AA 300m hurdle event for which Kpana-Quamoh had qualified, a moment of silence was observed in the stadium. The funeral service was held the following day at Riverwood Church of Christ with the burial taking place in Spring Hill Cemetery in Madison, Tennessee.

== Personal bests ==
Event	Mark	Venue	Date
300m hurdles	39.68	Lipscomb University	May 19, 2016
1500m	4:51.30	MTSU	May 19, 2015
Triple Jump	43’ 0”	APSU	April 2, 2016
