= Pinuccio Sciola =

Italian painter

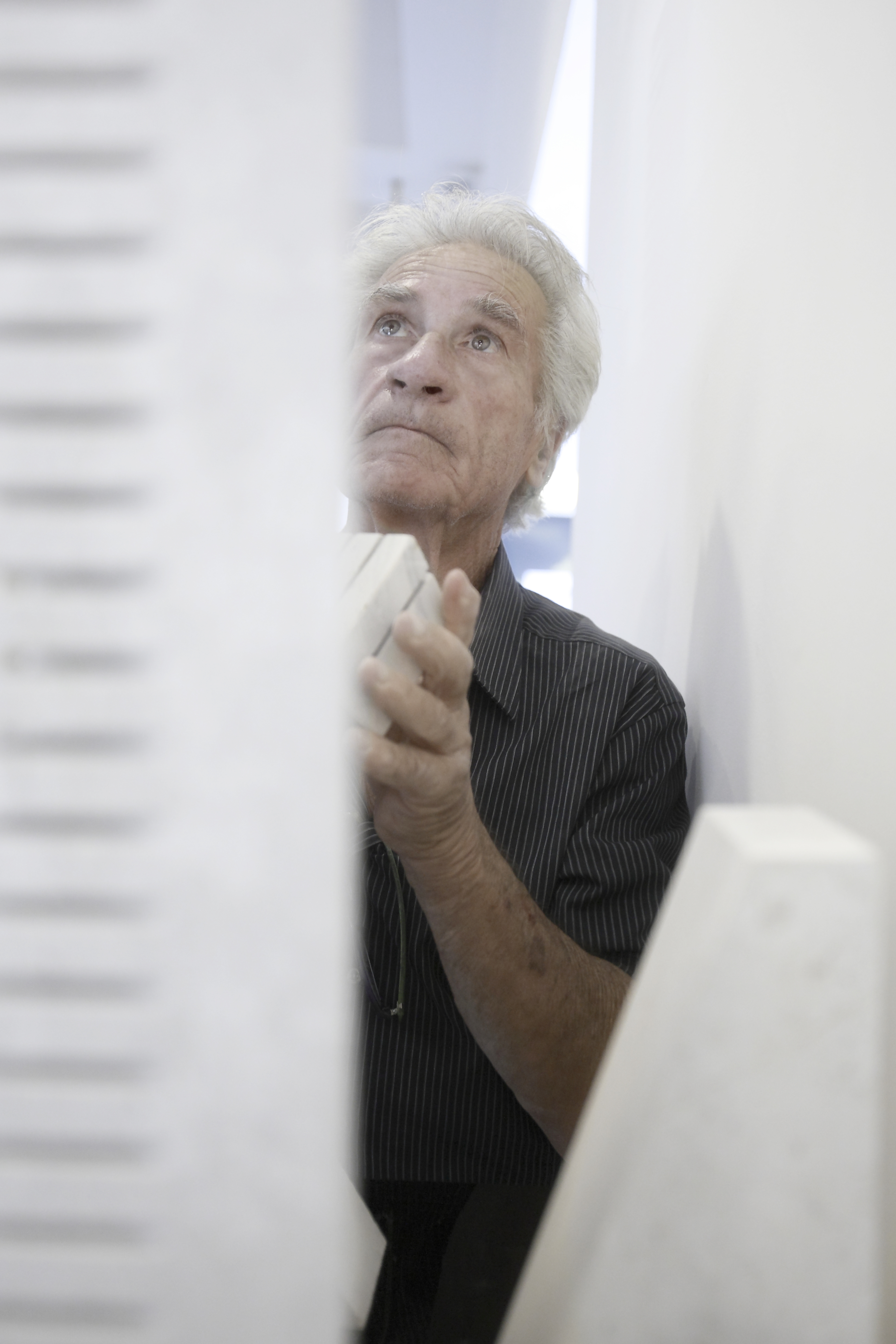
Pinuccio Sciola

Pinuccio Sciola (15 March 1942 – 13 May 2016) was an Italian sculptor and muralist from San Sperate, Sardinia. His work has been mentioned as a major attraction of the nearby town of Assemini and Alghero.

In 1973 Sciola travelled to Mexico City to work with David Alfaro Siqueiros. He then focused primarily on sculpture. Among his most well-known pieces are the pietre sonore ("sounding stones") – large sculptures made of limestones or basalts that alter their appearance at human contact.

Sciola's work was exhibited at the 37th Venice Biennale (1976), the 10th Rome Quadriennale (1985) and Expo 2000 in Hannover. Public commissions include the Rotonda della Besana in Milan (1984); The Grand Trianon in Versailles (1996); and Renzo Piano's Auditorium City of Music Park in Rome (2003).

In 1996 his sound-stones were played by the percussionist Pierre Favre at the Time in Jazz Festival in Berchidda.
