= Boniface Choi Ki-san =

South Korean Catholic bishop (1948–2016)

- Born: 16 May 1948; Gimpo, South Korea
- Died: 30 May 2016 (aged 68)
- Education: Catholic University of Korea

Korean name
- Hangul: 최기산
- Hanja: 崔基山
- RR: Choe Gisan
- MR: Ch'oe Kisan

Boniface Choi Ki-san (Korean: 최기산; 16 May 1948 – 30 May 2016) was a South Korean Roman Catholic bishop.

Choi was born in Gimpo, and graduated from the Catholic University of Korea's School of Theology. Ordained to the priesthood in 1975, Choi served as coadjutor bishop of the Roman Catholic Diocese of Incheon, South Korea from 1999 to 2002 and bishop of the diocese from 2002 until his death in 2016.
