= Seiji Arikawa =

Japanese politician (1929–2016)

- 有川 清次

Member of the House of Representatives
- In office 18 February 1990 – 18 June 1993
- Preceded by: Sadanori Yamanaka
- Succeeded by: Sadanori Yamanaka
- Constituency: Kagoshima 3rd

Personal details
- Born: 17 December 1929 Kagoshima Prefecture, Japan
- Died: 13 May 2016 (aged 86)
- Party: Socialist
- Education: Kanoya High School

Seiji Arikawa (有川 清次, Arikawa Seiji; 17 December 1929 – 13 May 2016) was a Japanese politician of the Socialist Party. He served as a member of the House of Representatives in the Diet (national legislature) from 1990 until 1993. He had previously served on the city council of Kanoya, Kagoshima.
