= 2016 in the Czech Republic =

- Decades: 1990s; 2000s; 2010s; 2020s
- See also: Other events of 2016; History of the Czech lands • Years

This article lists events from the year 2016 in the Czech Republic.

== Incumbents ==
- President – Miloš Zeman
- Prime Minister – Bohuslav Sobotka

== Events ==
- 14 April – The Czech Republic's political leadership agreed to make Czechia the official short name in English.
- 2 May – Czechia was approved by the Czech cabinet.
- 5 July – Czechia was published in the United Nations UNTERM and UNGEGN country name databases.
- 10 October – Czech botanists announce the discovery of a new species of Thismia in Borneo.

== In popular culture ==
- March 31, 2016, Tiger Theory, comedy film directed by Radek Bajgar, releases and premieres.
- 28 June – 3 July – The 2016 UCI Mountain Bike & Trials World Championships were hosted in the town of Nové Město na Moravě.
- 1 July – Anthropoid, historical thriller film directed by Sean Ellis, premieres at the Karlovy Vary International Film Festival.

== Deaths ==
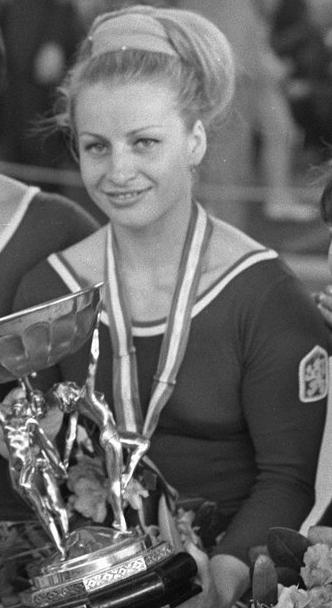
Věra Čáslavská (1942–2016) in 1967

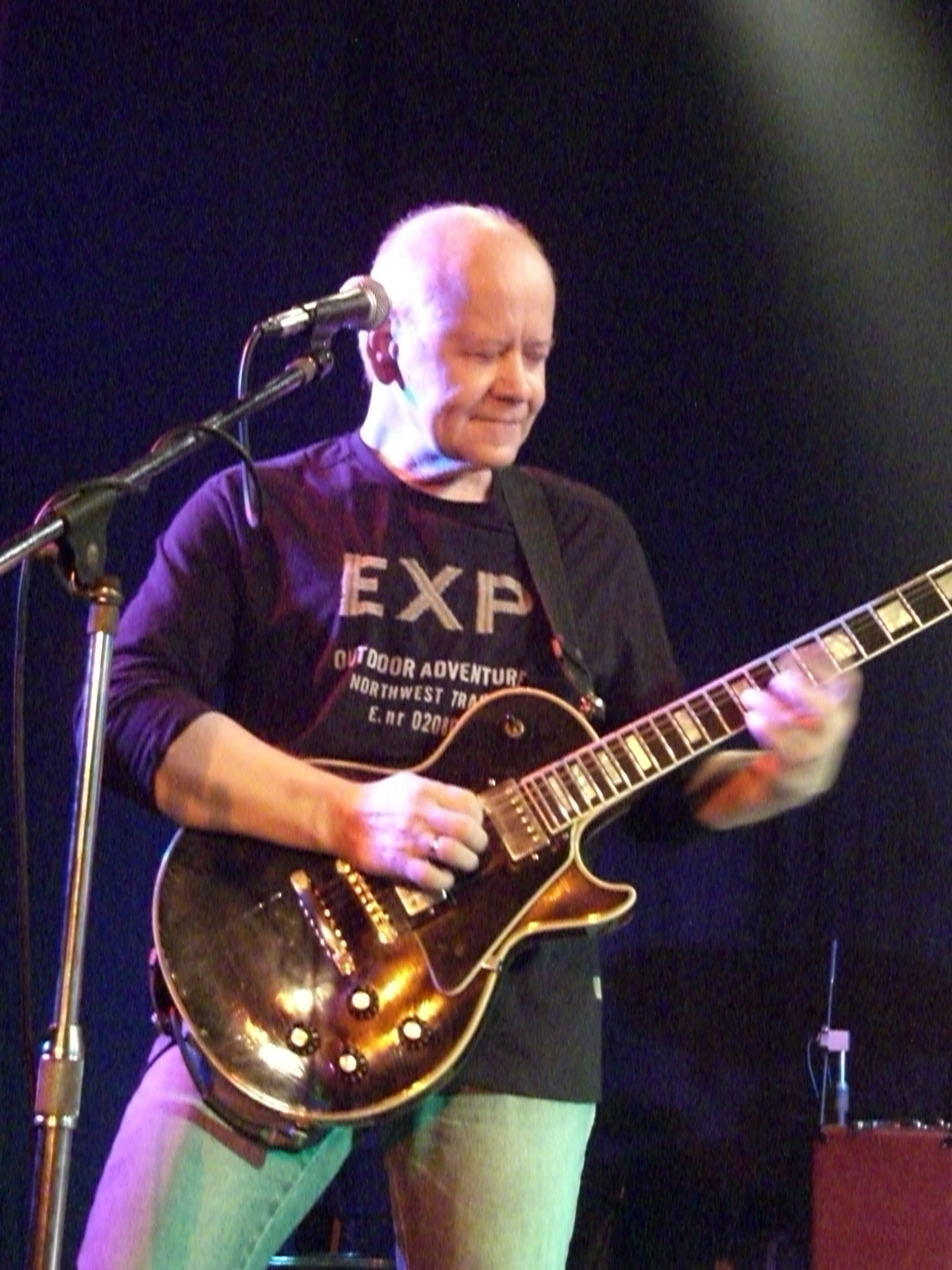
Radim Hladík (1946–2016) in 2007

- 22 January – Miloslav Ransdorf, politician (born 1953)
- 13 February – Bořek Šípek, architect (born 1949)
- 25 February –
  - Zdeněk Smetana, animator (born 1925)
  - Miloš Hájek, historian and politician (born 1921)
- 18 March – Jan Němec, filmmaker (born 1936)
- 2 April – Boris Hybner, actor (born 1941)
- 13 April – Věra Kubánková, actress (born 1924)
- 12 May – Bohumil Kubát, wrestler, Olympic bronze medallist (born 1935)
- 13 May – Jan Korger, politician (born 1937)
- 14 May – Jaroslav Malina, scenographer (born 1937)
- 22 May – Adolf Born, painter (born 1930)
- 23 May – Zdeněk Mézl, printmaker (born 1934)
- 27 May – František Jakubec, football player (born 1956)
- 16 June – Luděk Macela, football player (born 1950)
- 5 July – Zdeněk Neubauer, philosopher and biologist (born 1942)
- 12 July – Antonín Rükl, astronomer (born 1932)
- 24 July – Bohuslav Kokotek, Lutheran clergyman (born 1949)
- 26 August – Jiří Tichý, football player (born 1933)
- 30 August – Věra Čáslavská, gymnast, seven-time Olympic gold medallist (born 1942)
- 5 September – Jaroslav Jareš, football player (born 1930)
- 9 September – Zdeněk Měřínský, archaeologist (born 1948)
- 26 September – Karel Růžička, pianist (born 1940)
- 8 November – Zdeněk Altner, lawyer (born 1947)
- 4 December – Radim Hladík, guitarist (born 1946)
- 23 December – Luba Skořepová, actress (born 1923)
- 26 December – Petr Hájek, scientist (born 1940)
