= 2018 in the Czech Republic =

- Decades: 1990s; 2000s; 2010s; 2020s
- See also: Other events of 2018; History of the Czech lands • Years

Events in the year 2018 in the Czech Republic.

== Incumbents ==
- President – Miloš Zeman
- Prime Minister – Andrej Babiš

== Events ==
- January – In the Czech presidential election, 2018, Miloš Zeman defeated Jiří Drahoš and was reelected for a second term in office.

=== Sports ===
- 9 to 25 February – Czech Republic participated at the 2018 Winter Olympics in PyeongChang, South Korea, with 93 competitors in 13 sports
- 9 to 18 March – Czech Republic participated at the 2018 Winter Paralympics in PyeongChang, South Korea

== Deaths ==
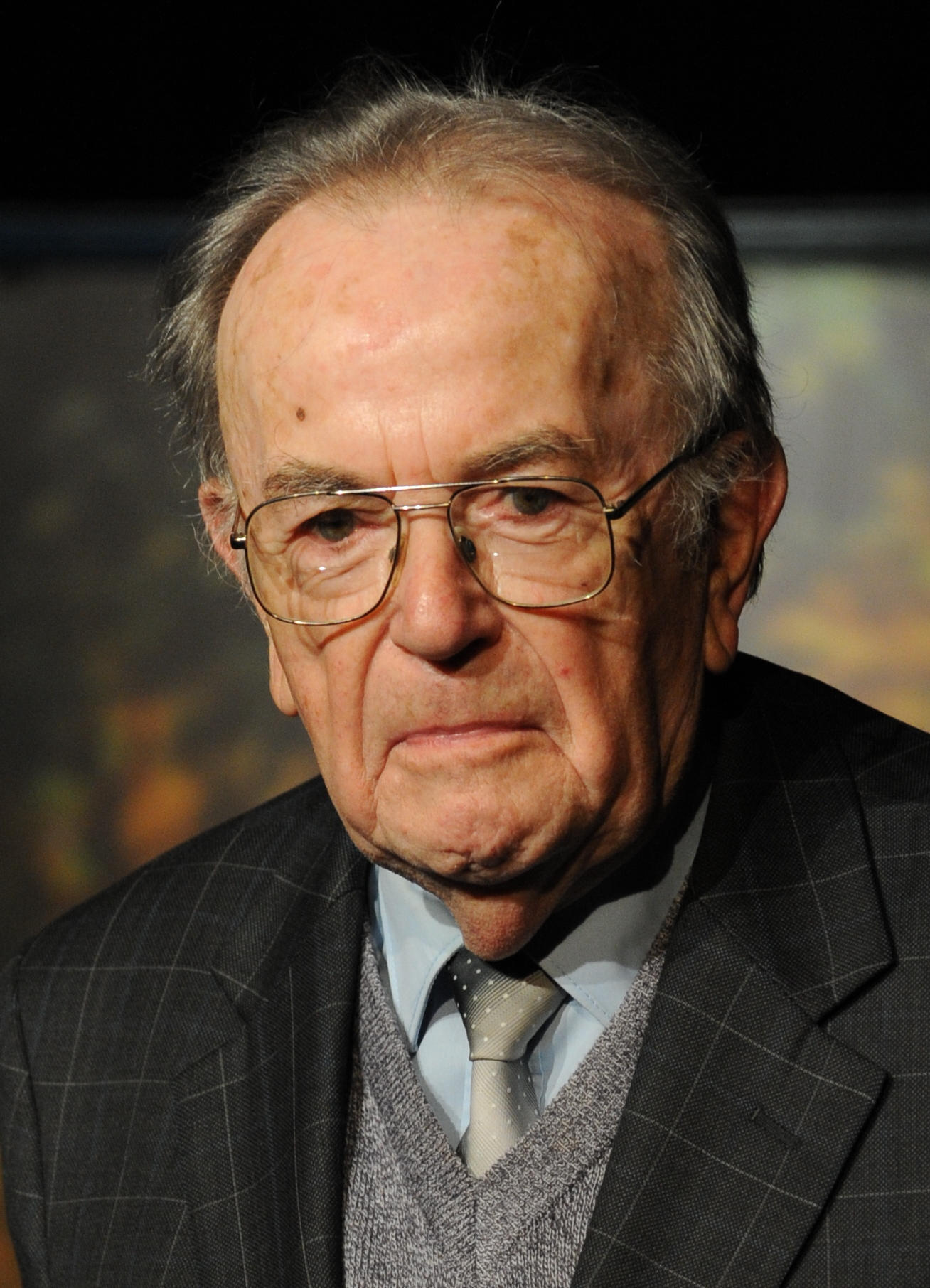
Rudolf Anděl

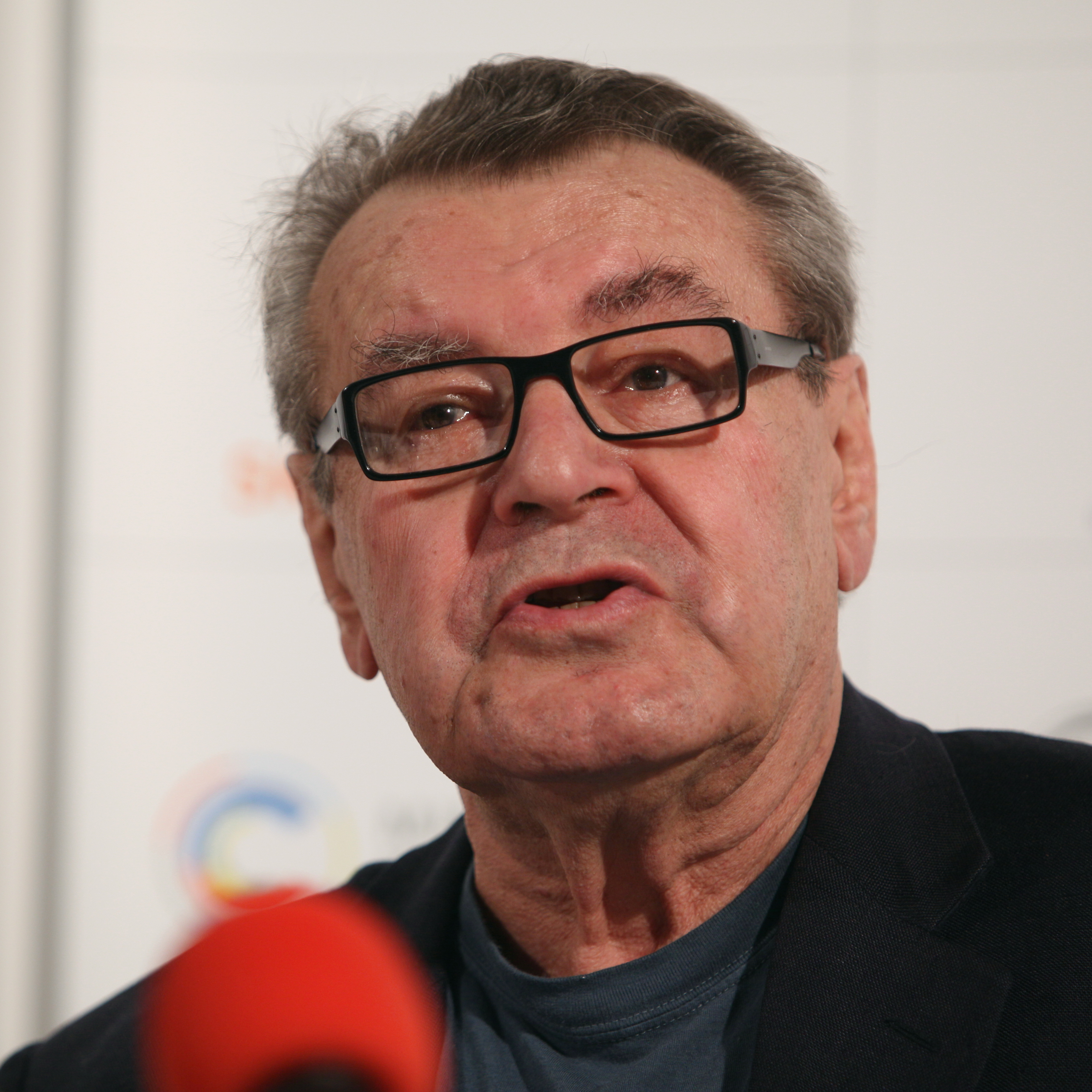
Miloš Forman in 2009

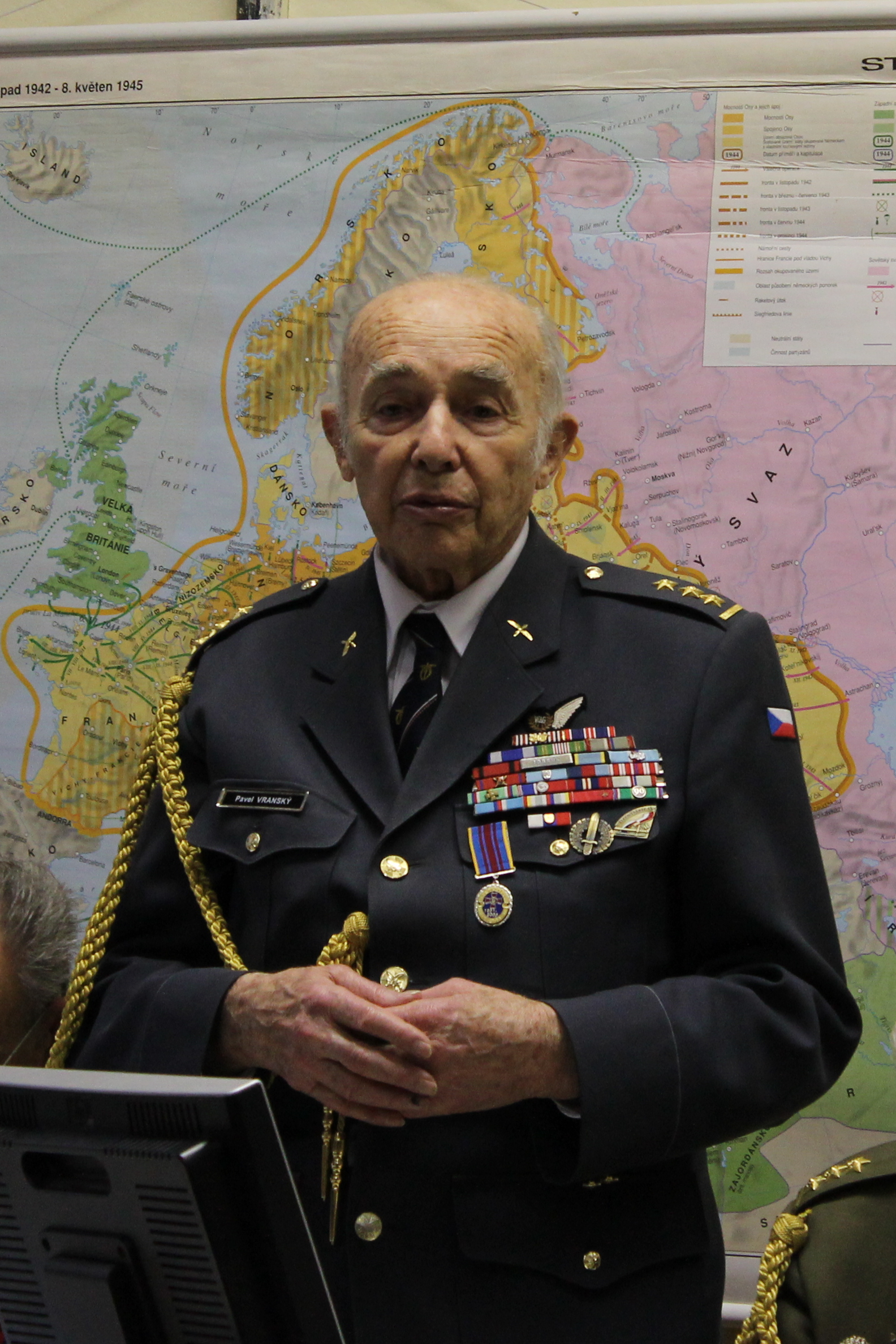
Pavel Vranský

- 1 January – Jakub Zedníček, actor, tap dancer and presenter (b. 1990)
- 2 January – Rudolf Anděl, historian and academic (b. 1924).
- 2 January – Karel Makonj, puppet theatre director and theorist (b. 1947)
- 8 January – Vojtěch Lindaur, journalist and record producer (b. 1957).
- 2 March – Ota Filip, novelist and journalist (b. 1930)
- 16 March – Otomar Kvěch, composer (b. 1950).
- 17 March – Zdeněk Mahler, writer, musicologist, pedagogue and screenwriter (b. 1928)
- 22 March – Jan Kantůrek, translator (b. 1948)
- 22 March – Dagmar Lieblová, Holocaust survivor, Germanist and translator, Order of Tomáš Garrigue Masaryk recipient (b. 1929).
- 24 March – Karel Stretti, art restorer (b. 1943).
- 13 April – Miloš Forman, film director (One Flew Over the Cuckoo's Nest, Amadeus, The People vs. Larry Flynt), Oscar winner (1975, 1984) (b. 1932).
- 20 April – Pavel Šrut, poet (b. 1940)
- 1 May – Pavel Pergl, footballer (b. 1977).
- 20 May – Jaroslav Brabec, shot putter (b. 1949)
- 24 June – Pavel Vranský, brigadier general, World War II veteran (b. 1921).
- 11 July – Václav Glazar, actor (b. 1952).
