= 2022 in the Czech Republic =

- Decades: 2000s; 2010s; 2020s
- See also: Other events of 2022; History of the Czech lands • Years

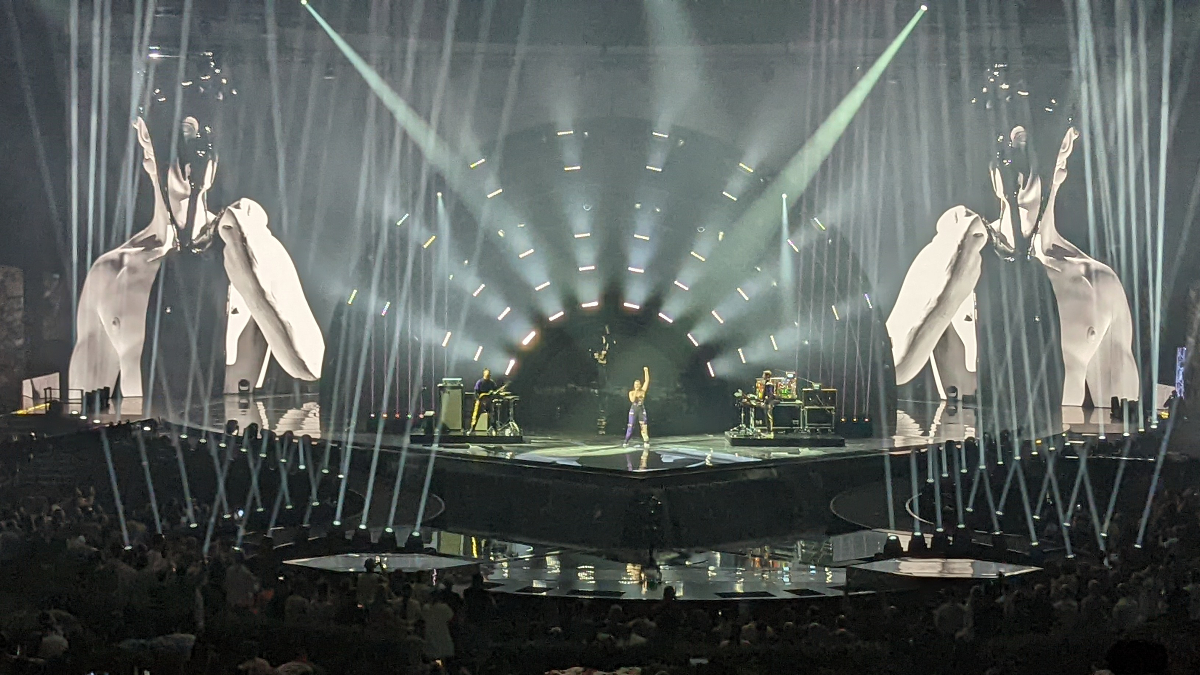
We Are Domi performing the song "Lights Off" on stage at the second semi-final of the Eurovision Song Contest 2022, held on 12th May 2022 at the Pala Olimpico arena in Turin, Italy, representing the Czech Republic.

Events in the year 2022 in the Czech Republic.

== Incumbents ==
- President – Miloš Zeman
- Prime Minister – Petr Fiala

== Events ==
Ongoing — COVID-19 pandemic in the Czech Republic

- 20 January – The government suspends plans to make COVID-19 vaccination mandatory for key workers and people over the age of 60, which was expected to come into effect in March.
- 3 September – An estimated 70,000 people, mostly from parties such as Freedom and Direct Democracy and the Communist Party, march in Prague, Czech Republic, demanding the government do more to control soaring energy prices in the country. Organizers of the march criticized rising energy costs, immigration to the country, mask mandates, and the country's involvement in the Russo-Ukrainian War.

== Deaths ==
- 3 January – Jiří Patera, 85, Czech-born Canadian mathematician.
- 8 January – Stanislav Rudolf, 89, Czech writer, screenwriter and dramaturge.
- 9 January – Dušan Klein, 82, Czech film director and screenwriter (How the World Is Losing Poets, How Poets Are Losing Their Illusions, How Poets Are Enjoying Their Lives).
- 31 January –
  - Jiří Kyncl, 59, Czech Olympic speed skater (1988, 1992).
  - Radko Pytlík, 93, Czech literary historian and writer.
- 2 February – Jan Netopilík, 85, Czech Olympic long jumper (1960).
