= 2021 in the Czech Republic =

- Decades: 2000s; 2010s; 2020s
- See also: Other events of 2021; History of the Czech lands • Years

Events in the year 2021 in the Czech Republic.

== Incumbents ==
- President – Miloš Zeman
- Prime Minister – Andrej Babiš then Petr Fiala

== Events ==
Ongoing — COVID-19 pandemic in the Czech Republic

- 4 April – 2021 Světec train crash
- 24 June – A rare tornado sweeps through several villages, killing six people and leaving more than 150 others injured.
- 21 July – After a vote in the Chamber of Deputies, and the Czech Senate with Civic Democratic Party (Czech Republic), ANO 2011 and Freedom and Direct Democracy voting Yes. The Czech Republic enshrines Right to keep and bear arms in the Constitution.
- 4 August – Milavče train collision

=== Scheduled events ===
- 8 and 9 October – Scheduled date for the 2021 Czech legislative election.
- The 2021 Men's European Volleyball Championship is set to be held in the Czech Republic and three other countries (Poland, Estonia and Finland).

== Deaths ==
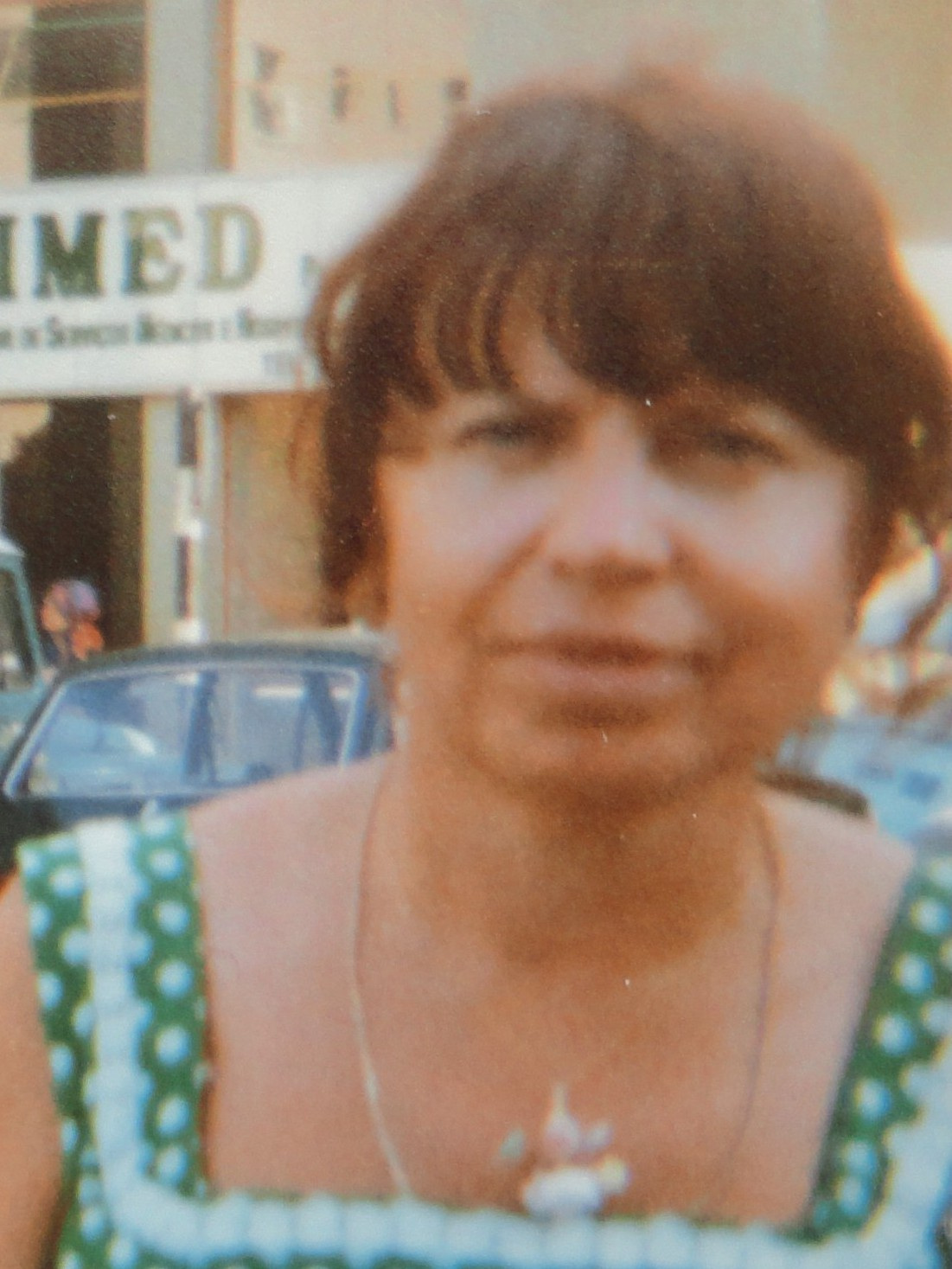
Květa Eretová

- 2 January – Marek Pivovar, writer and theatre director (born 1964).
- 8 January – Květa Eretová, chess player (born 1926).
