= 2013 in the Czech Republic =

- Decades: 1990s; 2000s; 2010s; 2020s
- See also: Other events of 2013; History of the Czech lands • Years

Events from the year 2013 in the Czech Republic.

== Incumbents ==
- President: Václav Klaus (until 7 March). Miloš Zeman (starting 8 March)
- Prime Minister: Petr Nečas (until 10 July), Jiří Rusnok (starting 10 July)

== Events ==
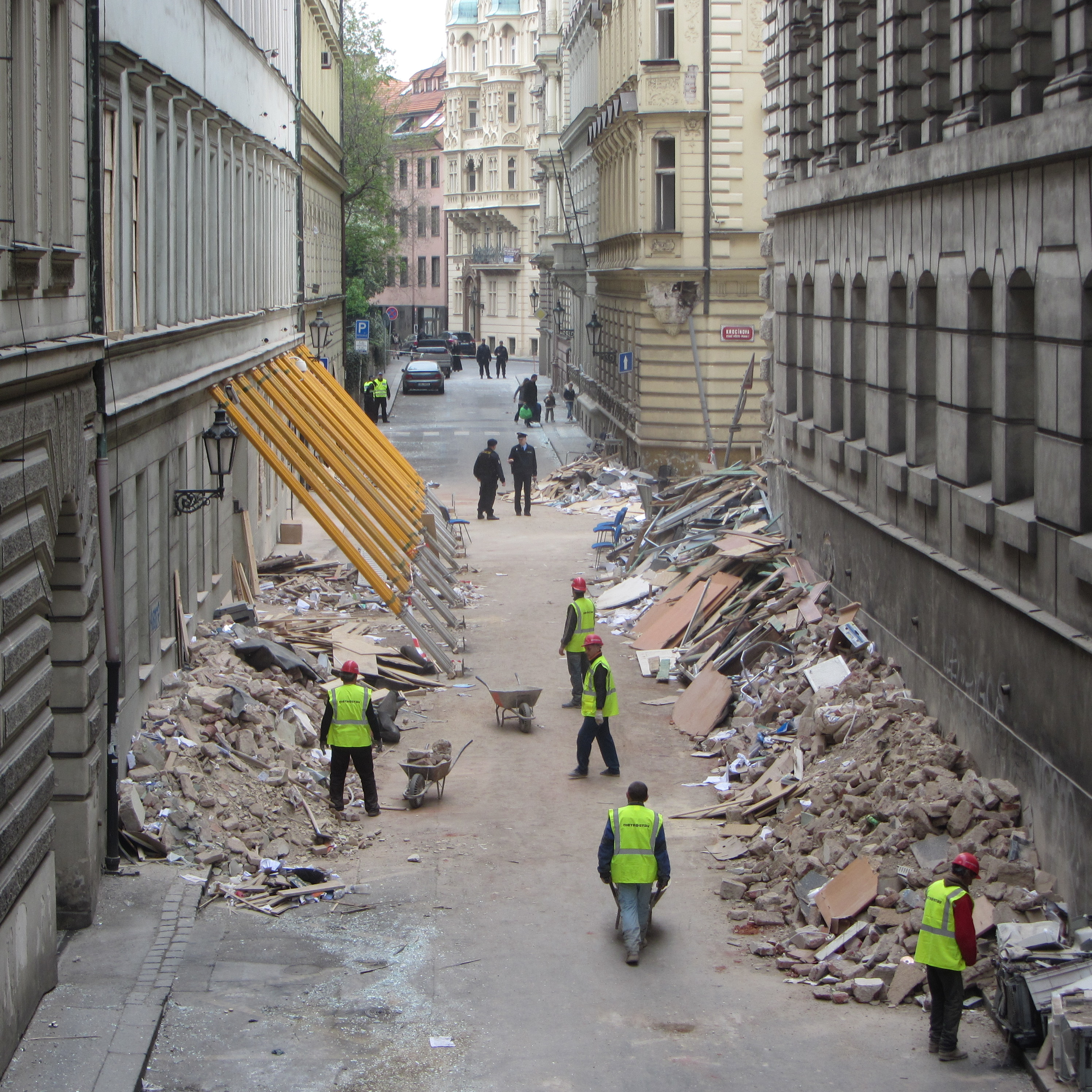
Divadelní Street in Prague's Old Town following the explosion

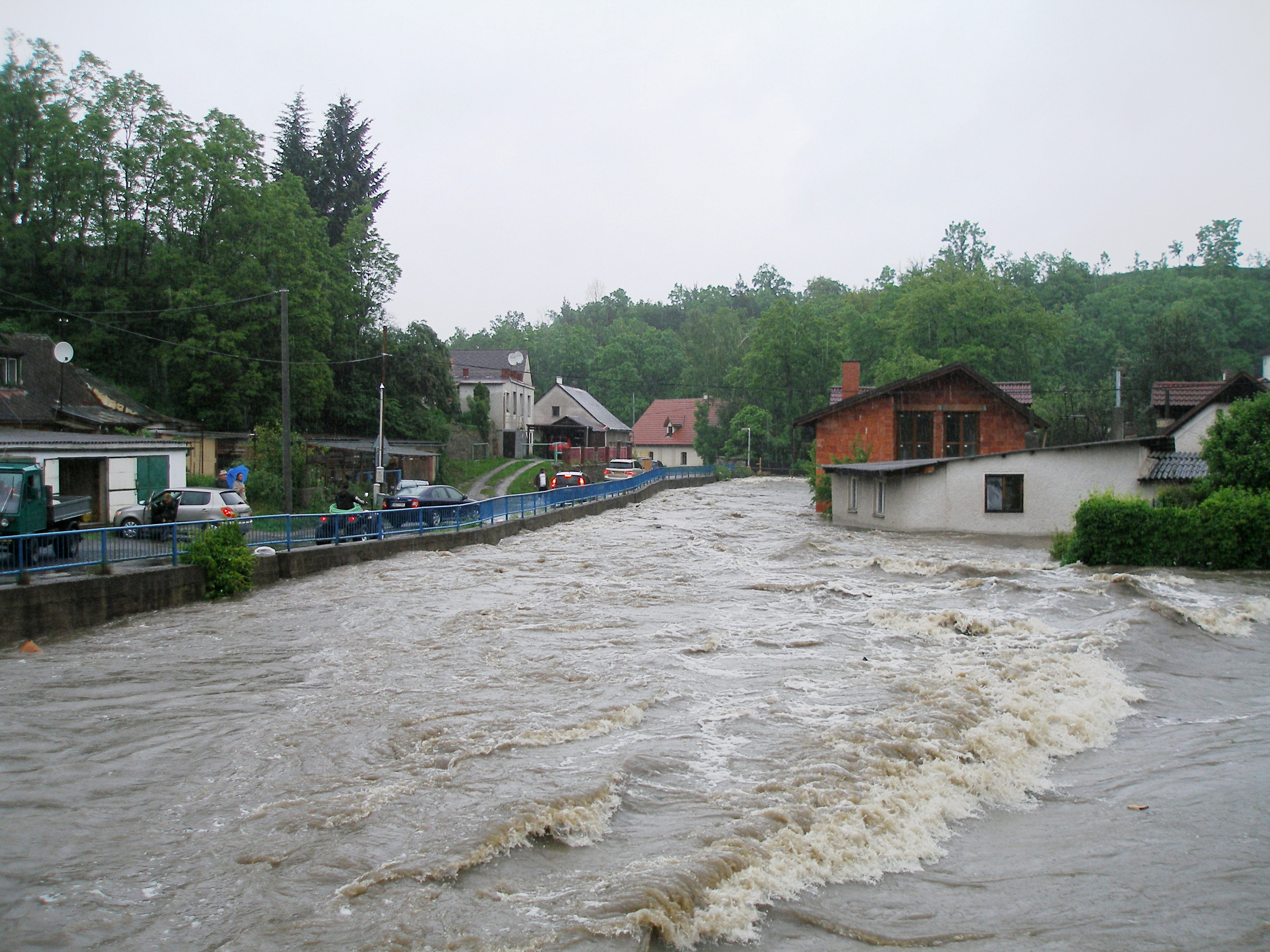
Flooding in Nový Knín, Czech Republic on June 2, 2013

- January 26 - Czech presidential election, 2013
- April 29 - A powerful explosion badly damaged an office building in the center of Prague, injuring up to 43 people.
- June 17 - prime minister Petr Nečas submits his resignation after a corruption scandal.
- November 21 - A Prague nursing school issues a hijab ban, coursing some controversy.

== Sports ==
April 24–28: Ellen van Dijk wins 2013 Gracia-Orlová

== Deaths ==
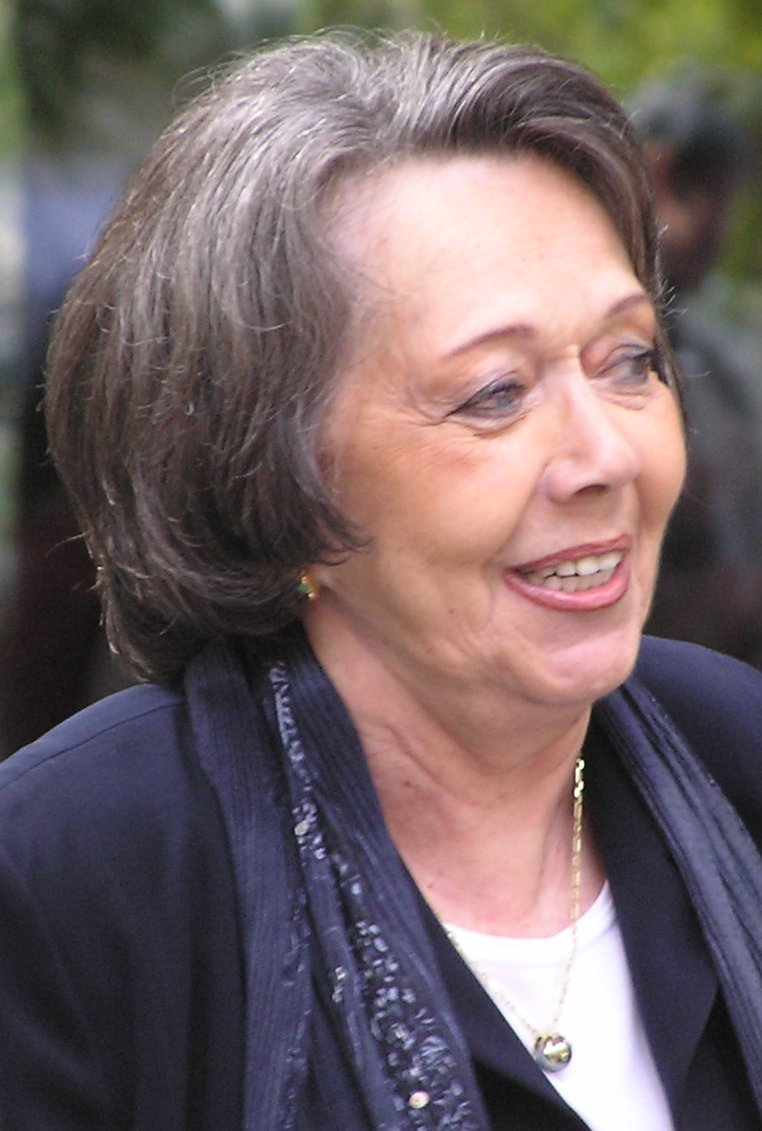
Jiřina Jirásková (1931–2013) in 2006

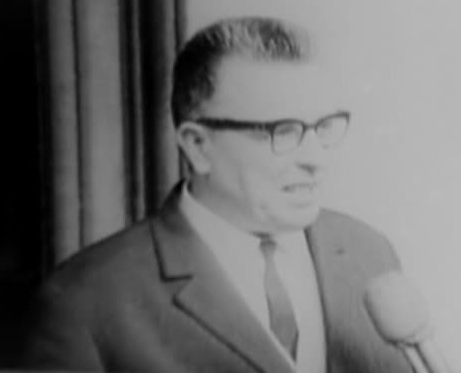
Čestmír Císař (1920–2013) in 1968

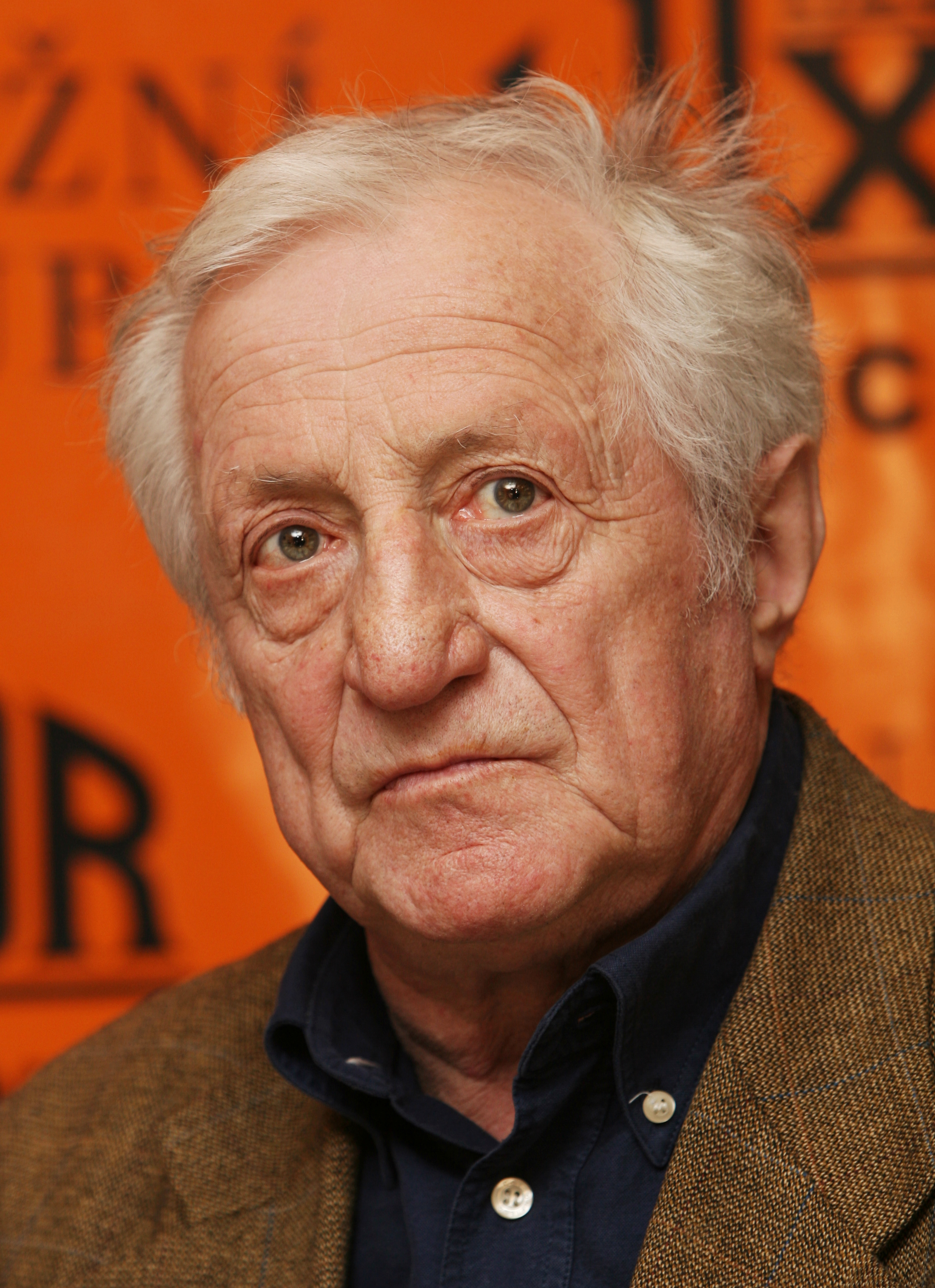
Pavel Bobek (1937–2013) in 2008

- 2 January – Karel Čáslavský, film historian and television host (born 1937)
- 3 January – Ivan Mackerle, cryptozoologist (born 1942)
- 7 January – Jiřina Jirásková, actress (born 1931)
- 10 January – Michael Hofbauer, actor (born 1964)
- 18 January – Martin Barbarič, football player (born 1970)
- 24 January – Miroslav Janů, football player (born 1959)
- 28 January –
  - Oldřich Kulhánek, painter (born 1940)
  - Ladislav Pavlovič, Czechoslovak football player (born 1926)
- 24 January – Jan Lužný, gardener (born 1926)
- 1 February – Rudolf Dašek, guitarist (born 1933)
- 3 February – Edgar Knobloch, writer (born 1927)
- 14 February – Zdeněk Zikán, football player (born 1937)
- 2 March – Zdeněk Švestka, astronomer (born 1925)
- 9 March – Luboš Měkota, entrepreneur (born 1957)
- 17 March – Rudolf Battěk, politician (born 1924)
- 22 March – Vladimír Čech, actor (born 1951)
- 23 March – Miroslav Štěpán, politician (born 1945)
- 24 March – Čestmír Císař, politician (born 1920)
- 4 May – Oldřich Velen, actor (born 1921)
- 15 May – Thomas M. Messer, director of The Guggenheim (born 1920)
- 16 May – Valtr Komárek, economist (born 1930)
- 20 May – Miloslav Kříž, basketball player (born 1924)
- 9 June – Zdeněk Rotrekl, poet (born 1920)
- 19 June – Filip Topol, singer (born 1965)
- 27 July – Josef Geryk, football player (born 1942)
- 8 August – Jiří Krejčík, film director and actor (born 1918)
- 22 August – Petr Kment, wrestler, Olympic bronze medalist (born 1942)
- 7 September – Ilja Hurník, composer (born 2013)
- 10 September – Josef Němec, boxer (born 1933)
- 2 October – Zdeněk Rytíř, singer (born 1933)
- 5 October – Erich Cviertna, football player and manager (born 1951)
- 28 October – Ferdinand Havlík, composer (born 1928)
- 16 November – Zbyněk Hejda, poet (born 1930)
- 20 November – Pavel Bobek, singer (born 1937)
- 25 November – Egon Lánský, politician (born 1934)
