= 2020 in the Czech Republic =

- Decades: 2000s; 2010s; 2020s
- See also: Other events of 2020; History of the Czech lands • Years

Events in the year 2020 in the Czech Republic.

== Incumbents ==
- President – Miloš Zeman
- Prime Minister – Andrej Babiš

== Events ==
- Planned: the 2020 Czech regional elections will be held in 13 regions.
- 8 August 2020 – A fire incident in an apartment in Bohumín killed at least 11 people and further leaving 10 others injured.

== Deaths ==
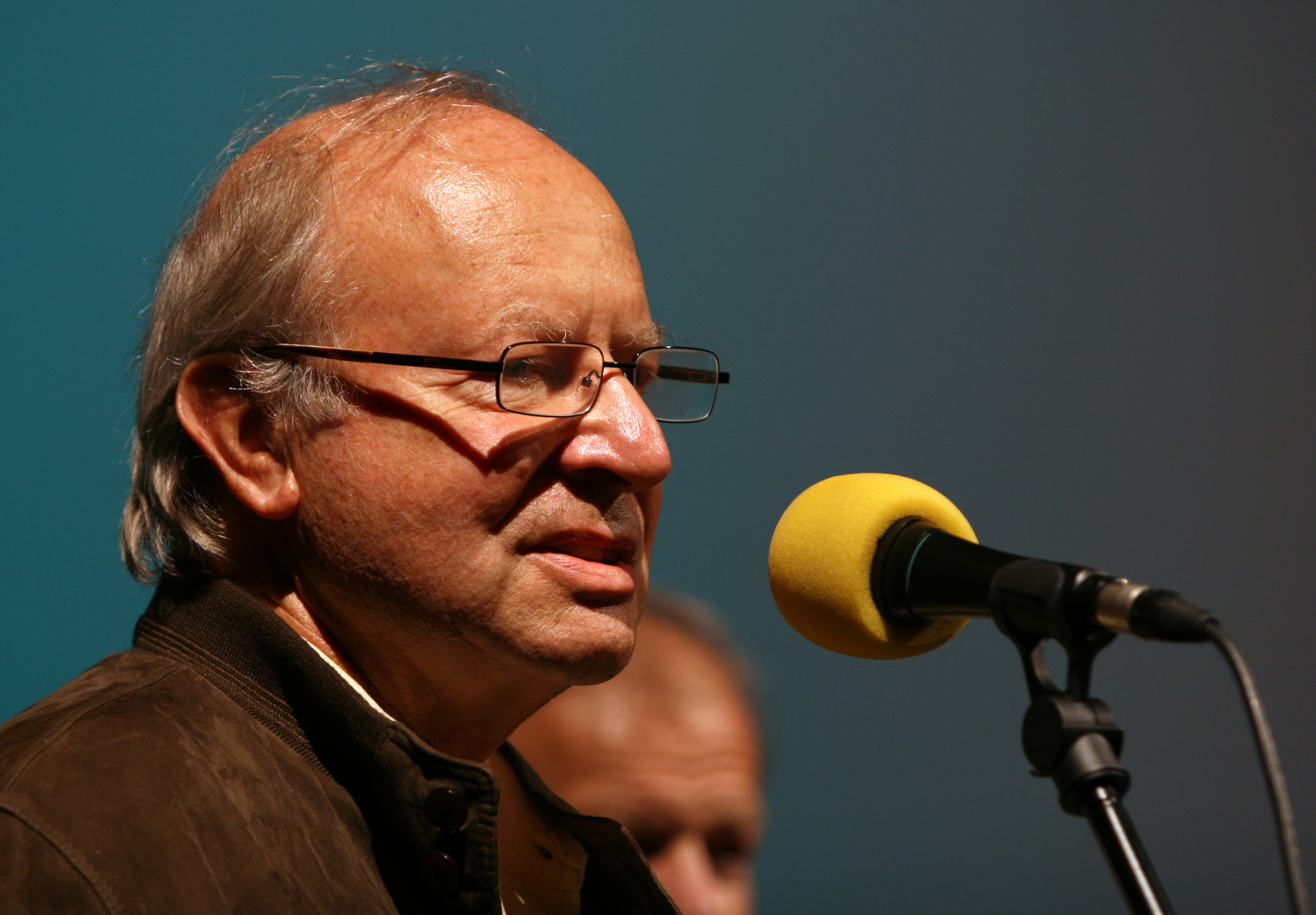
Ivan Passer

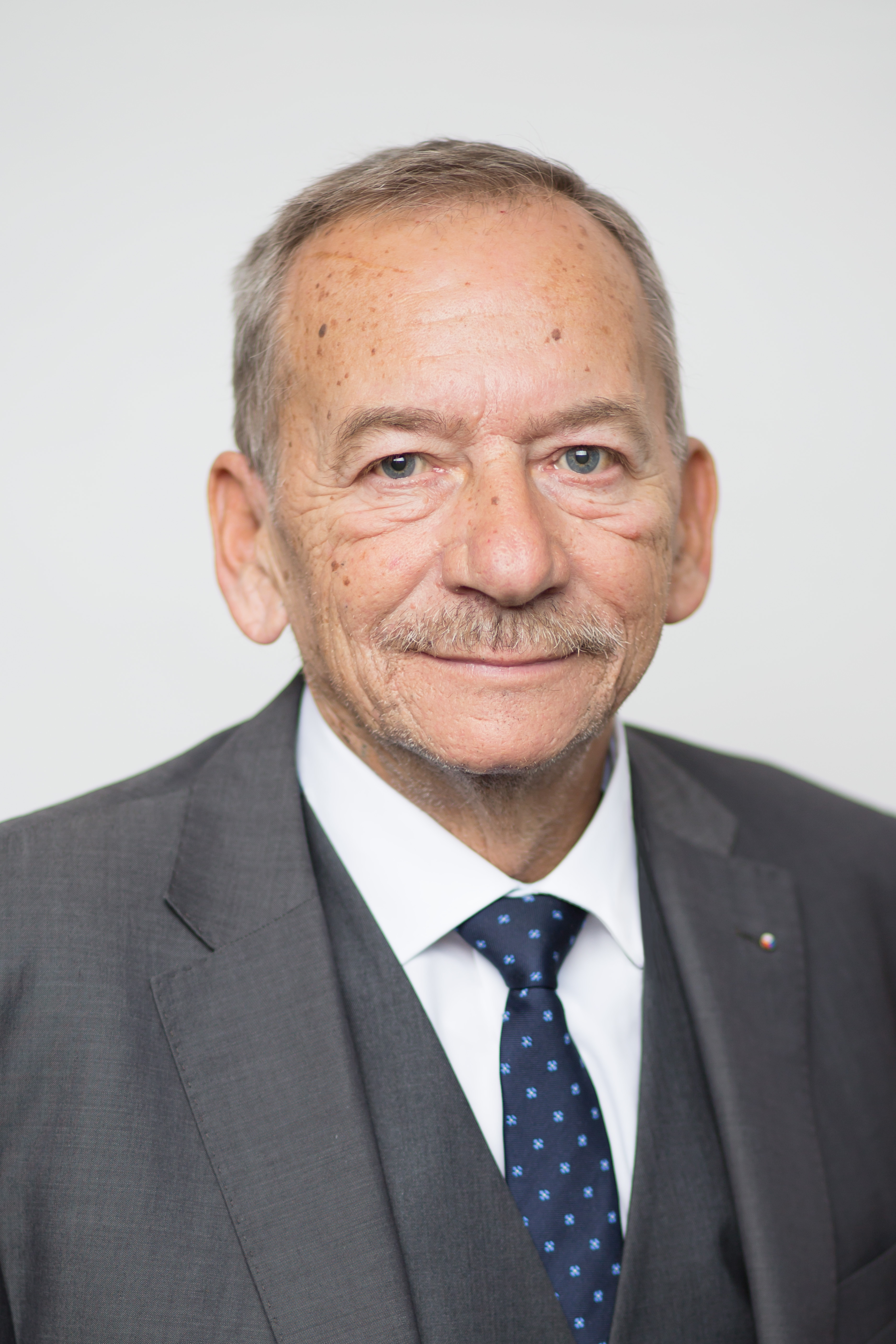
Jaroslav Kubera

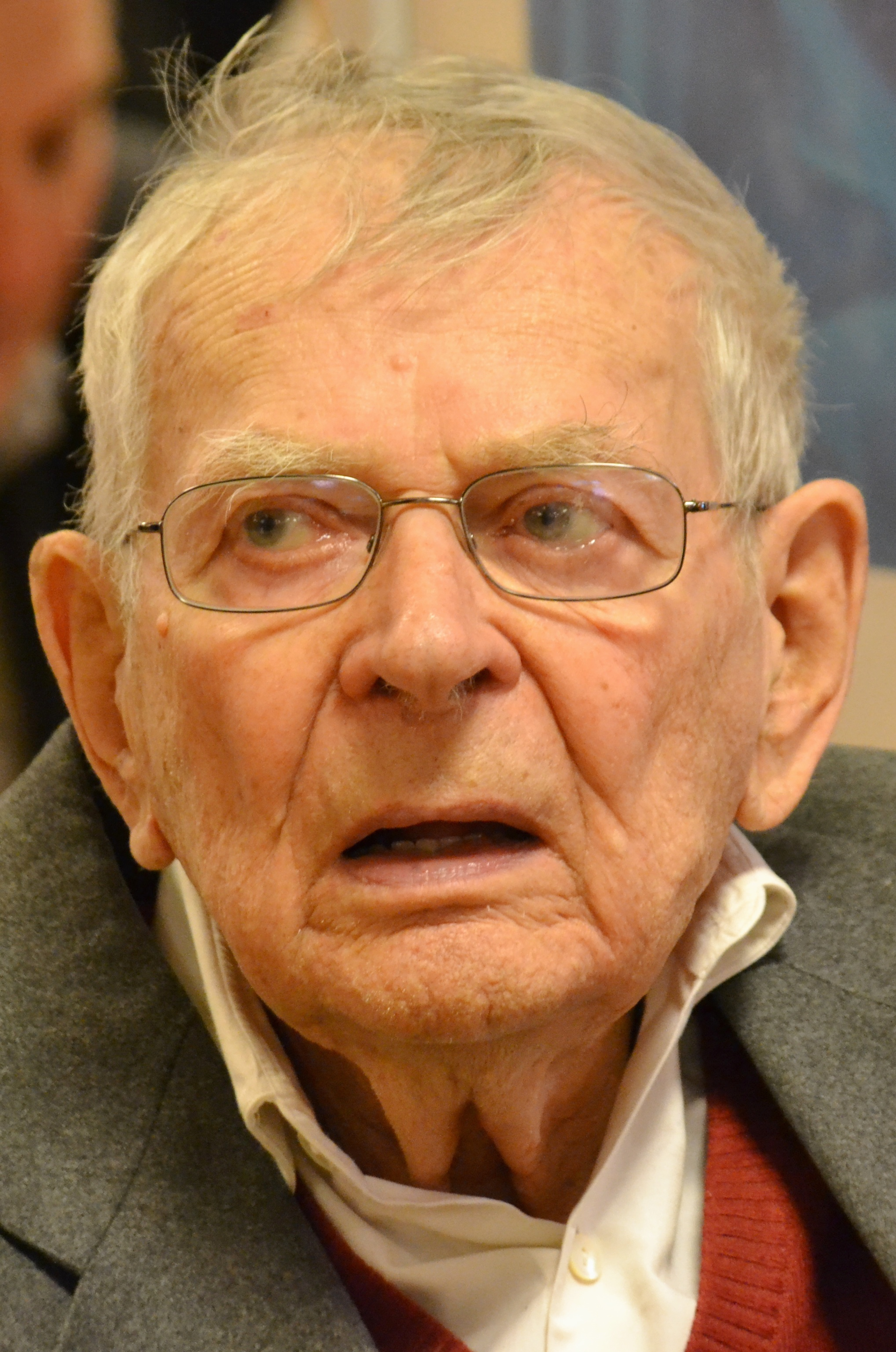
Jan Skopeček

- 9 January –
  - Ivan Passer, film director and screenwriter (b. 1933).
  - Karel Saitl, weightlifter (b. 1924).
- 14 January – Naděžda Kniplová, operatic soprano (b. 1932).
- 15 January – Bruno Nettl, Czech-born American ethnomusicologist and musicologist (b. 1930).
- 18 January – Petr Pokorný, Protestant theologian (b. 1933).
- 20 January – Jaroslav Kubera, politician, President of the Senate (b. 1947).
- 12 May – Radim Novák, footballer (b. 1978).
- 27 July – Jan Skopeček, actor and playwright (b. 1925).
- 3 August – Hana Krampolová, actress (b. 1961).
- 4 August – Irena Sedlecká, sculptor (b. 1928).
