= 2017 in the Czech Republic =

- Decades: 1990s; 2000s; 2010s; 2020s
- See also: Other events of 2017; History of the Czech lands • Years

Events from the year 2017 in the Czech Republic

== Incumbents ==
- President – Miloš Zeman
- Prime Minister – Bohuslav Sobotka then Andrej Babiš

== Popular events ==
- 22 January – Green Day themselves are coming back to the Czech Republic along with the new album and classic hits after seven years.
- 27 January – A Czech court rules in favour of a nursing school that banned a Somali refugee student from wearing a headscarf.
- 6 February – A Prague Fast-Food Restaurant Bans the Burka.
- 19 August – A famous English singer Robbie Williams performed in the open together with a legendary synthpop duo Erasure.
- 19 September – A Czech appeals court upholds a lower court ruling that went against the headscarf.
- 21 October - ANO, (lit. "yes") a right-wing populist political party led by businessman and Andrej Babiš wins, Okamura and the Pirates win a large parcentage and the Social Democrats collapse.

== In popular culture ==
=== Sports ===
- 25–29 January – The 2017 European Figure Skating Championships were hosted by the Czech Figure Skating Association.
- 2–14 May – The 2017 UEFA Women's Under-17 Championship was hosted in the cities of Plzeň and Příbram, and the towns of Přeštice and Domažlice.
- 16–25 June – The EuroBasket Women 2017 was hosted in the Czech cities of Prague and Hradec Králové.

=== Television ===
- 2 January – First episode of the television series Svět pod hlavou was aired (first of ten episodes).

== Deaths ==
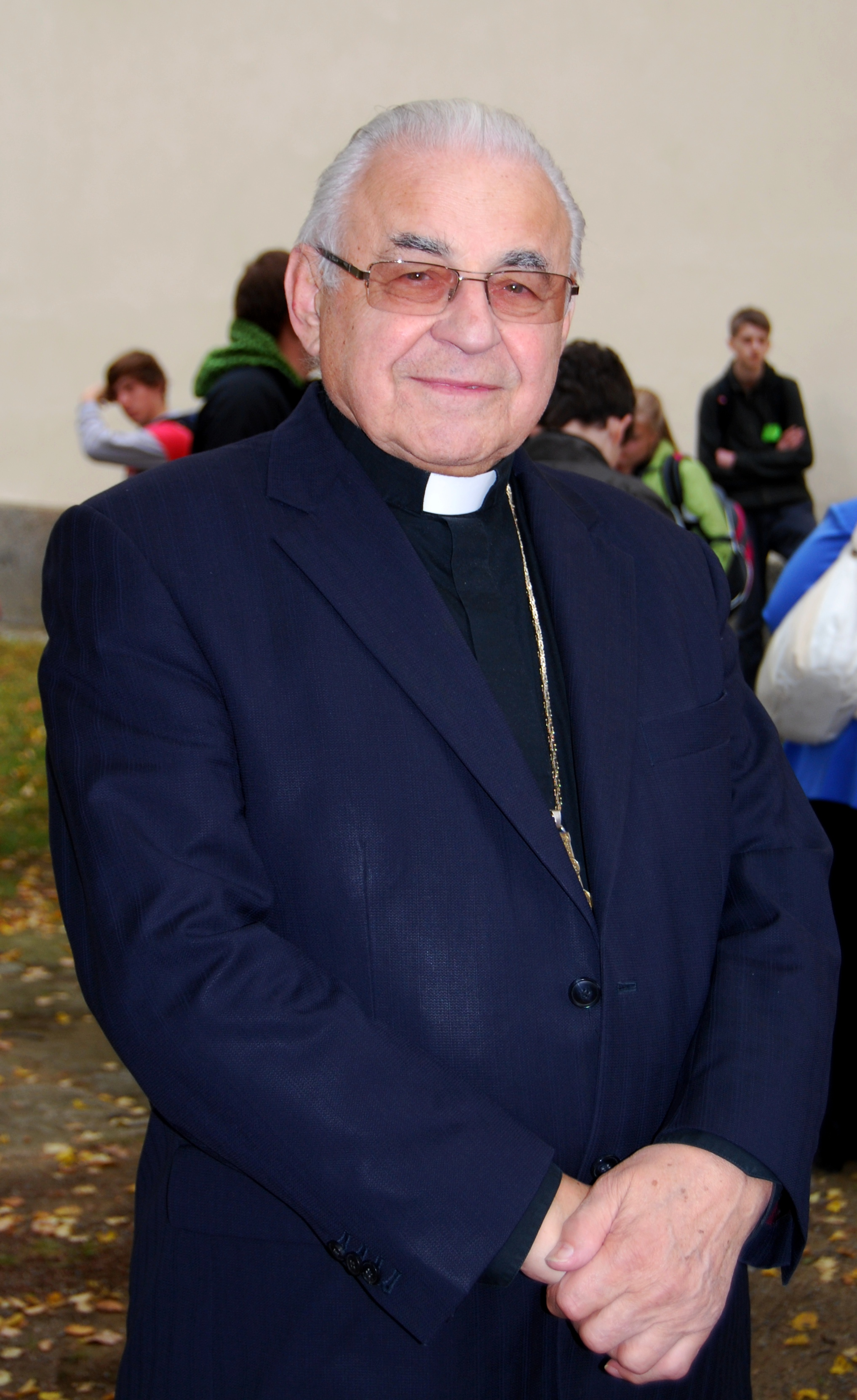
Miloslav Vlk (1932–2017) in 2012

- 16 January – Jiří Navrátil, scout leader (b. 1923).
- 20 January – Naděžda Kavalírová, physician and human rights activist (b. 1923).
- 23 January – Jaroslav Vacek, Indologist (b. 1943).
- 27 January – Petr Kop, volleyball player and Olympian (b. 1937).
- 28 January – Lubomír Doležel, literary theorist (b. 1922).
- 7 February – Antonín Přidal, writer and translator (b. 1935).
- 11 February – Jarmila Šuláková, folk singer and actress (b. 1929).
- 14 February – Jiří Lanský, high jumper and Olympian (b. 1933).
- 16 February – Josef Augusta, ice hockey player and coach (b. 1946).
- 23 February – Ivo Svoboda, politician (b. 1948).
- 18 March – Miloslav Vlk, cardinal and Archbishop of Prague (b. 1932).
- 22 March –
  - Alexandr Kliment, writer (b. 1929).
  - Helena Štáchová, puppeteer (b. 1944).
- 26 March – Věra Špinarová, singer (b. 1951).
- 6 April – Libuše Havelková, actress (b. 1924).
- 18 April – Augustin Bubník, ice hockey player and Olympian (b. 1928).
- 23 April – František Rajtoral, footballer (b. 1986).
- 24 April –
  - František Brůna, handball player (b. 1944).
  - Dagmar Lerchová, figure skater and Olympian (b. 1930).
- 19 May – David Bystroň, footballer (b. 1982).
- 31 May – Jiří Bělohlávek, conductor (b. 1946).
- 2 June – Jaroslav Kořán, Mayor of Prague, translator (b. 1940).
- 15 June – Olbram Zoubek, sculptor (b. 1926).
- 25 June – Eduard Zeman, politician (b. 1948).
- 16 July – Eva Děpoltová, operatic soprano (b. 1945).
- 19 July – Karel Franta, painter (b. 1928).
- 22 July – František Ševčík, ice hockey player and Olympian (b. 1942).
- 25 July – Ivana Loudová, composer (b. 1941).
- 19 November – Jana Novotná, tennis player, (b. 1968).
- 2 December – Iva Ritschelová, economist, (b. 1964)
