= Kanturek =

Kanturek or Kantůrek is a Czech surname. Notable people with the surname include:

- Jan Kantůrek (1948–2018), Czech translator
- Jaroslav Kantůrek (born 1953), Czech basketball player
- Otto Kanturek (1897–1941), Austrian cameraman, cinematographer, and film director
