= 2015 in the Czech Republic =

- Decades: 1990s; 2000s; 2010s; 2020s
- See also: Other events of 2015; History of the Czech lands • Years

Events from the year 2015 in the Czech Republic.

== Incumbents ==
- President – Miloš Zeman
- Prime Minister – Bohuslav Sobotka

== Events ==
- 24 February – The Uherský Brod shooting
- 23 July – Studénka train crash

== In popular culture ==
=== Sports ===
- 31 January – 1 February – The 2015 UCI Cyclo-cross World Championships were hosted in the town of Tábor.
- 5–8 March – The 2015 European Athletics Indoor Championships were hosted in the city of Prague.
- 1–3 May – The 2015 Canoe Sprint European Championships were hosted in the village of Račice.
- 1–17 May – The 2015 IIHF World Championship was hosted in the cities of Prague and Ostrava.
- 15–30 June – The 2015 UEFA European Under-21 Championship was hosted in the cities of Prague, Olomouc and Uherské Hradiště.
- 14–15 November – The 2015 Fed Cup final was hosted in Prague.

=== Film ===
- 26 February – Ghoul, horror film directed by Petr Jákl, was released in the Czech Republic.
- 5 July – Home Care, drama film directed by Slávek Horák, was released in the Czech Republic.

== Deaths ==
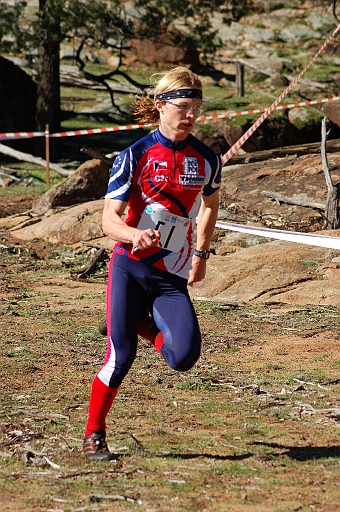
Štěpán Kodeda at JWOC 2007

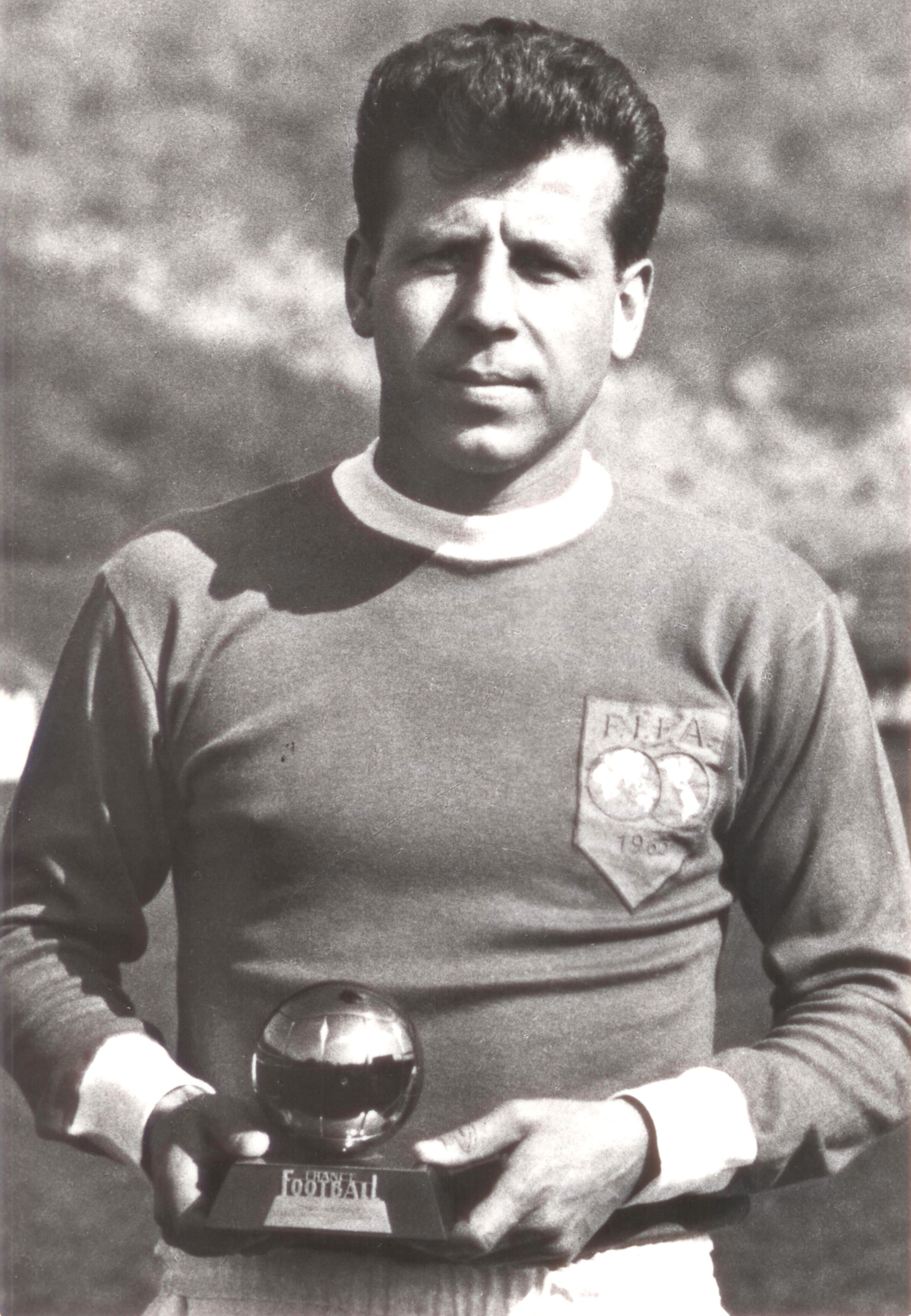
Josef Masopust in 1962

- 6 January – Vlastimil Bubník, ice hockey and football player (born 1931)
- 15 January – Ludmila Brožová-Polednová, state prosecutor (born 1921)
- 15 January – Karel Lichtnégl, football player, Olympic silver medalist (born 1936)
- 20 January – Marie Pilátová, actress (born 1921)
- 19 March – Stanislav Prýl, ice hockey player (born 1942)
- 20 March –
  - Petr Vopěnka, mathematician, developer of Alternative Set Theory (born 1935)
  - Josef Mikoláš, ice hockey player (born 1938)
- 28 March – Miroslav Ondříček, cinematographer (born 1934)
- 30 March – Štěpán Kodeda, orienteering competitor, complications after traffic accident (born 1988).
- 31 March – Dalibor Vesely, architectural historian (born 1934)
- 16 April – Stanislav Gross, Prime Minister (born 1969)
- 17 April – Jaroslav Holík, ice hockey player (born 1942)
- 20 April – Václav Rabas, organist (born 1933)
- 25 April – Jiří Hledík, football player (born 1929)
- 1 May – Karel Vasak, academic (born 1929)
- 10 May – Jindřich Roudný, Olympian (born 1924)
- 6 June – Ludvík Vaculík, writer (born 1926)
- 8 June – Otakar Hořínek, sport shooter, Olympic silver medallist (born 1929)
- 26 June – Kája Saudek, comics illustrator (born 1935)
- 29 June – Josef Masopust, footballer (born 1931)
- 1 July – Miloslava Misáková, gymnast, Olympic gold medallist (born 1922)
- 11 July – Ota Petřina, guitarist (born 1949)
- 19 July – Václav Snítil, violinist (born 1928)
- 27 July – Ivan Moravec, pianist (born 1930)
- 30 July –
  - Ludmila Dvořáková, operatic soprano (born 1923)
  - Alena Vrzáňová, figure skater (born 1931)
- 20 August – Zuzana Brabcová, writer (born 1959)
- 1 September – Jiří Louda, heraldist (born 1920)
- 10 September – Radim Palouš, academic (born 1924)
- 2 October – Lubomír Lipský, actor (born 1923)
- 29 December – Pavel Srníček, football player (born 1968)
