= Altner =

Altner is a surname. Notable people with the surname include:

- Georg Altner (1901–1945), German politician
- Günter Altner (1936–2011), German biologist, theologian, ecologist, environmentalist, writer, and lecturer
- Stefan Altner, German musician, musicologist, and manager
- Zdeněk Altner (born 1947), Czech lawyer and advocate
