= 2014 in the Czech Republic =

- Decades: 1990s; 2000s; 2010s; 2020s
- See also: Other events of 2014; History of the Czech lands • Years

The following lists events that happened during 2014 in the Czech Republic.

== Incumbents ==
- President: Miloš Zeman
- Prime Minister: Jiří Rusnok (until 29 January), Bohuslav Sobotka (starting 29 January)

== Events ==
=== January ===
- January 1 - Jamal al-Jamal, a Palestinian ambassador to the Czech Republic, is killed in an explosion near his home in Prague.
- January 29 - A new coalition government is sworn in, led by Bohuslav Sobotka and consisting of the Social Democrats, the liberalist ANO 2011 and the Christian Democrats.

=== May ===
- May 21 - Ten men convicted for producing poisoned alcohol that killed more than 30 people in 2012 have been sentenced to prison by a court in the Czech Republic, including 2 life sentences.
