= 2019 in the Czech Republic =

- Decades: 1990s; 2000s; 2010s; 2020s
- See also: Other events of 2019; History of the Czech lands • Years

Events in the year 2019 in the Czech Republic.

== Incumbents ==
- President – Miloš Zeman
- Prime Minister – Andrej Babiš

== Events ==
- 24 and 25 May – Scheduled date for the 2019 European Parliament election in the Czech Republic
- 10 December – Ostrava hospital attack: In Ostrava, a man opens fire in a hospital's waiting room, killing six people before fleeing and subsequently shooting himself dead.

== Deaths ==
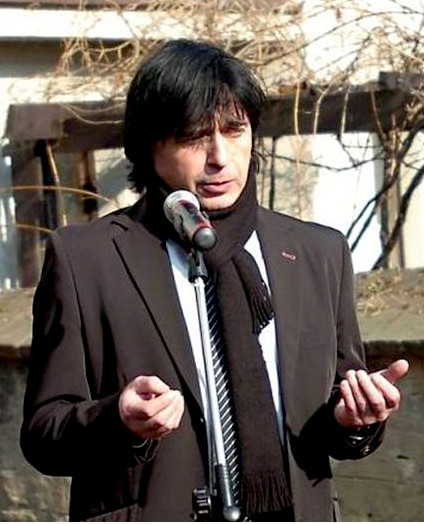
Karel Bican

- 5 January – Milan Jankovič, literary scholar, expert in Bohumil Hrabal work (b. 1929).
- 7 January – Ivan Mašek, dissident, economist and politician, Deputy (b. 1948).
- 10 January – Karel Bican, priest and ex-bishop of Czechoslovak Hussite Church (b. 1951).
- 15 January – Antonín Kramerius, footballer (b. 1939).
- 26 January – Luděk Munzar, actor (b. 1933).
- 20 April – Luděk Bukač, ice hockey player and manager (b. 1935).
- 29 April – Josef Šural, footballer (b. 1990)
- 1 October – Karel Gott, singer, actor, songwriter, painter (b. 1939)
