= 2024 in the Czech Republic =

- Decades: 2000s; 2010s; 2020s
- See also: Other events of 2024; History of the Czech lands • Years

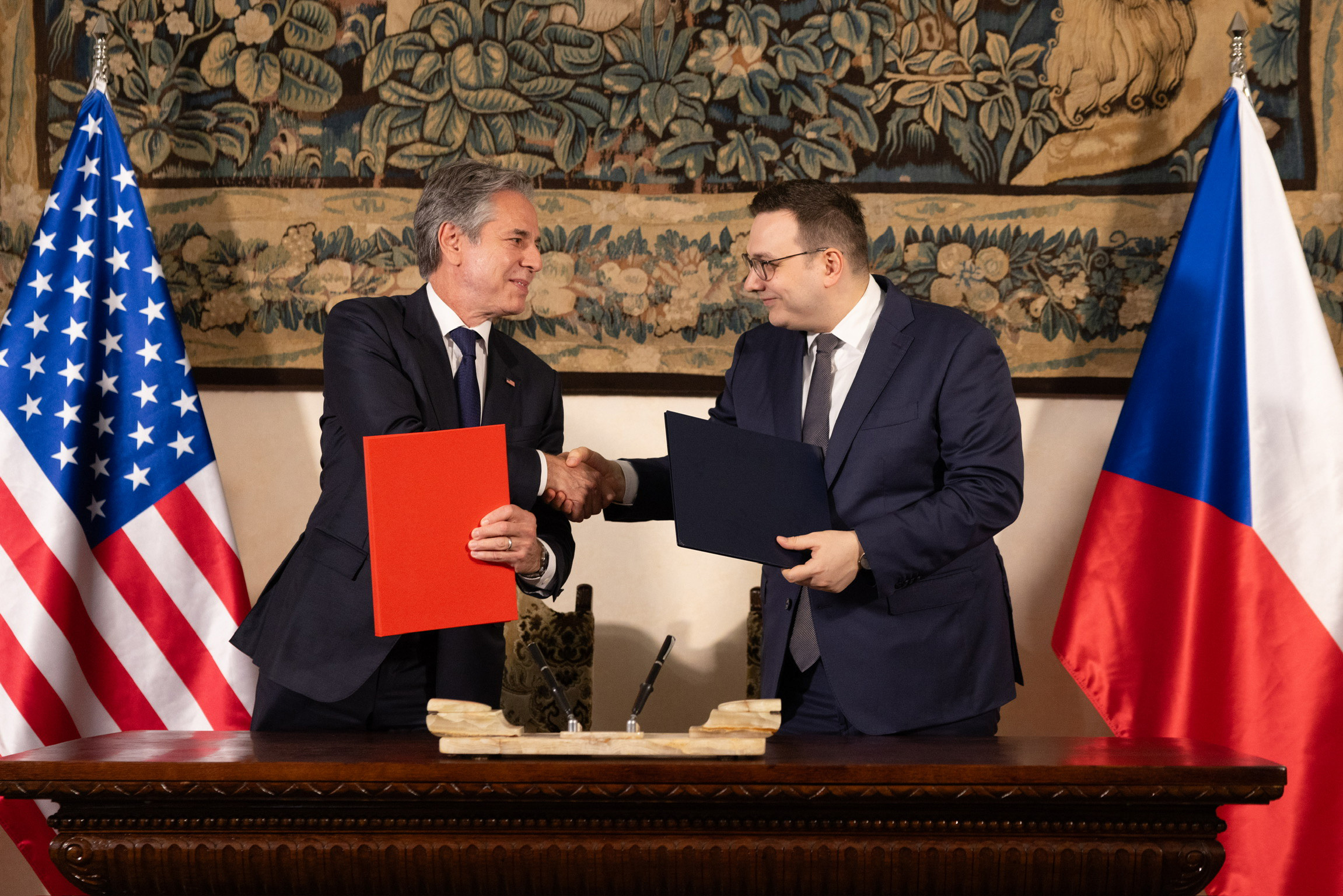
The signing of the Memorandum of Understanding in the Czech Republic in 2024 involving US Secretary of State Antony J. Blinken.

Events in the year 2024 in the Czech Republic.

== Incumbents ==
- President – Petr Pavel
- Prime Minister – Petr Fiala

== Events ==
=== January ===
- 24 January – A fast train collides with a truck in Bohumín, killing one person and injuring 19 others.

=== March ===
- 28 March – Russiagate: The Security Information Service reveals that Russia paid via the "Voice of Europe" hundreds of thousands of euros to European politicians aimed at influencing the European elections.

=== May ===
- 7 May – The Constitutional Court of the Czech Republic rules that requiring applicants seeking to officially change their gender to undergo gender-affirmation surgery, including sterilisation, is unconstitutional.
- 10–26 May – 2024 IIHF World Championship

=== June ===
- 3 June – Eighteen people are injured in a lightning strike in a castle park in Liberec-Vratislavice.
- 5 June – A freight train collides with a RegioJet passenger train in Pardubice, killing at least four people and injuring 23.
- 6 June – An arson attack is made on public buses in Prague. A suspect from Latin America is arrested, while Czech authorities suspect Russian involvement.
- 7 June – 2024 European Parliament election.
- 17 June – An explosion at a military training ground in Libavá Military Training Area caused by ammunition leaves one soldier dead and eight others injured.
- 19 June – Three people are injured in a knife attack at a gas station in Prague. A suspect is arrested.

=== July ===
- 16 July – The Czech government announces plans to facilitate production of the Colt CZ Group assault rifle and the construction of an ammunition factory in Ukraine.
- 17 July – The Czech government awards the Korea Hydro & Nuclear Power with a tender to build two reactors at the Dukovany Nuclear Power Station.

=== September ===
- 15–16 September – One person is killed and seven others are reported missing amid flooding caused by Storm Boris.
- 20–21 September – 2024 Czech Senate election (first round): The ANO wins a plurality of contested seats for the Senate and in regional elections.
- 24 September – Prime Minister Petr Fiala dismisses Czech Pirate Party leader Ivan Bartos as regional development minister, citing problems over a new digital system for issuing building permits. The dismissal prompts the Pirate Party to leave the governing coalition, resulting in a cabinet reshuffle that sees the dissolution of the ministry for legislation occupied by a Pirate minister.
- 27–28 September – 2024 Czech Senate election (second round): The ANO wins a total of eight seats, the party's strongest showing in a Senate election, while the ruling Spolu coalition wins 15.

=== October ===
- 4 October – Five children are hospitalised in Prague after accidentally ingesting magnets as part of a TikTok challenge.
- 24 October – The Czech Republic signs a treaty formalising its relations with the Holy See.
- 26 October - Czech Airlines ceases operations after 101 years of service.

== Holidays ==
- 1 January – New Year's Day
- 29 March – Good Friday
- 1 April – Easter Monday
- 1 May – Labour Day
- 8 May – Victory in Europe Day
- 5 July – St. Cyril and Methodius Day
- 6 July – Jan Hus
- 28 September – Czech Statehood Day
- 28 October – Independent Czechoslovak State Day
- 17 November – Freedom and Democracy Day
- 24 December – Christmas Eve
- 25 December – Christmas Day
- 26 December – Saint Stephen's Day

== Art and entertainment ==
- List of Czech submissions for the Academy Award for Best International Feature Film

== Deaths ==
- 1 January – Oldřich Semerák, 91, composer, trombonist and music educator.
- 6 January – Ivo Oberstein, 88, Czech architect and urbanist.
- 9 January:
  - Karel Janovický, 93, Czech-born British composer, pianist and radio producer (BBC World Service).
  - Jaroslav Pavlů, 87, ice hockey player (HC Škoda Plzeň, HC Kometa Brno, HC Bolzano) and head coach.
- 11 January – Jiří Neuwirt, 75, painter, illustrator and printmaker.
- 12 January – František Janouch, 92, nuclear physicist and dissident.
- 13 January:
  - Jana Hlaváčová, 85, actress (Operace Silver A, Angel of the Lord, The Dance Teacher).
  - Ladislav Svoboda, 85, physician (Rytíři Kladno) and politician, senator (1996–2008).
- 16 January – Norbert Lichý, 59, actor (Lidice, Hastrman) and musician.
- 26 January – Jiří Bičák, 82, physicist and academic.
- 5 December – Barbora Bühnová, 43, computer scientist, co-founder of Czechitas and advocate for women in tech.

== See also ==
- 2024 in the European Union
- 2024 in Europe
