= Pavel Vranský =

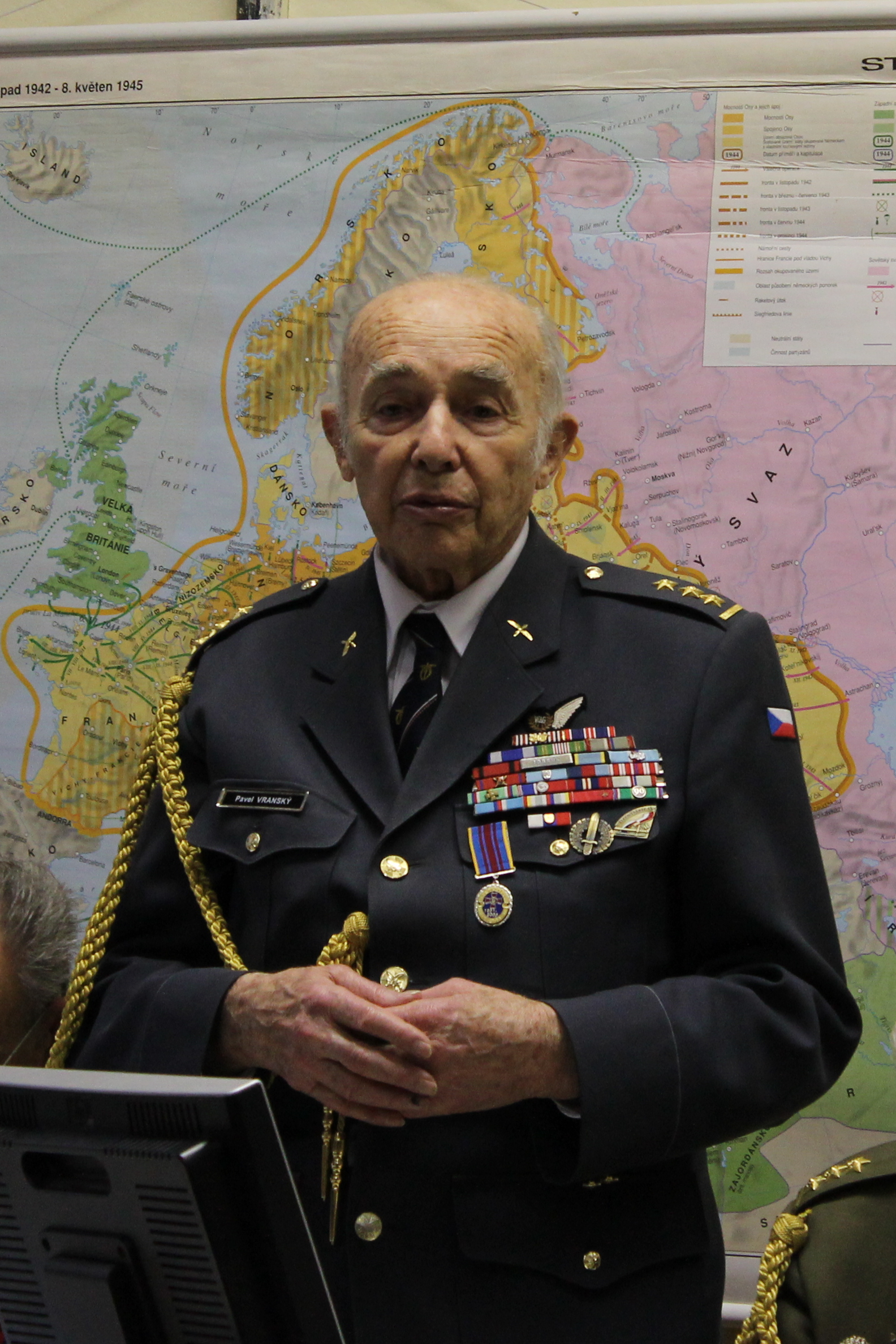
Vranský in 2012

Brigadier General Pavel Vranský (29 April 1921 – 24 June 2018) was a Czech airman who served with the Royal Air Force during World War II.

Vranský was born in Lipník nad Bečvou. After leaving school in 1939, he went to Poland, where he joined the Czechoslovak Legion. A Soviet prisoner from September 1939 until 1941, he was sent with the Czechoslovak 11th Infantry Battalion to fight in Syria and Tobruk. At the end of 1942, he joined the RAF and trained as an onboard radio operator.

In 2017, he was made a brigadier general by President of the Czech Republic Miloš Zeman.

Vranský died on 24 June 2018 and was buried at the Olšany Cemetery in Prague.
