= Egon Lánský =

Czech politician, journalist, political commentator, spokesperson and columnist

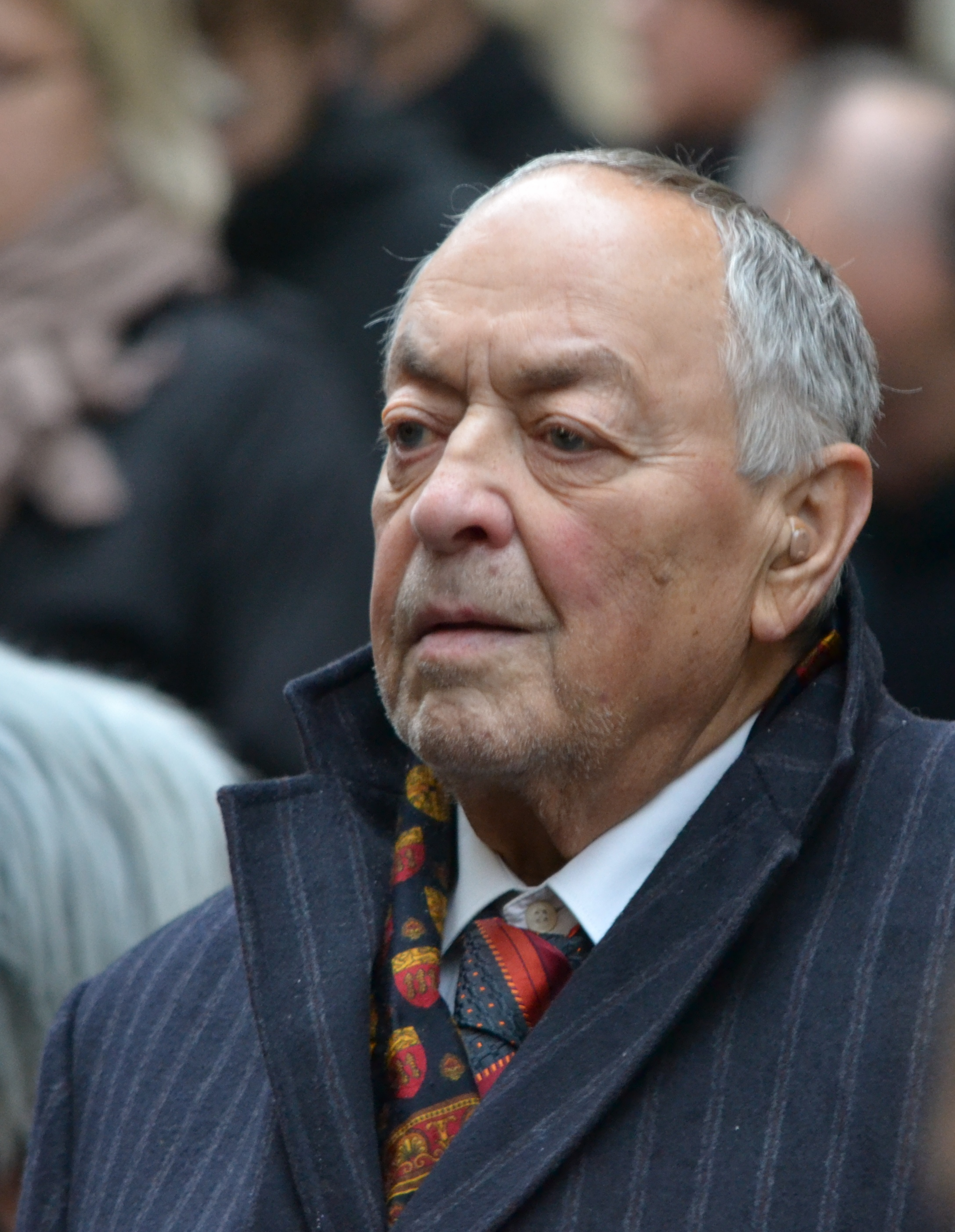
- Egon Lánský in November 2012
- Born: Egon Löwy; 23 July 1934; Trenčín, Czechoslovakia
- Died: 25 November 2013 (aged 79); Prague, Czech Republic
- Occupations: Politician, journalist, political commentator, spokesperson, columnist
- Years active: 1968–2002

Egon T. Lánský (born Egon Löwy; 23 July 1934 – 25 November 2013) was a Czech politician, journalist, political commentator, spokesperson and columnist. He was a member of the Czech Social Democratic Party (ČSSD).

== Career ==
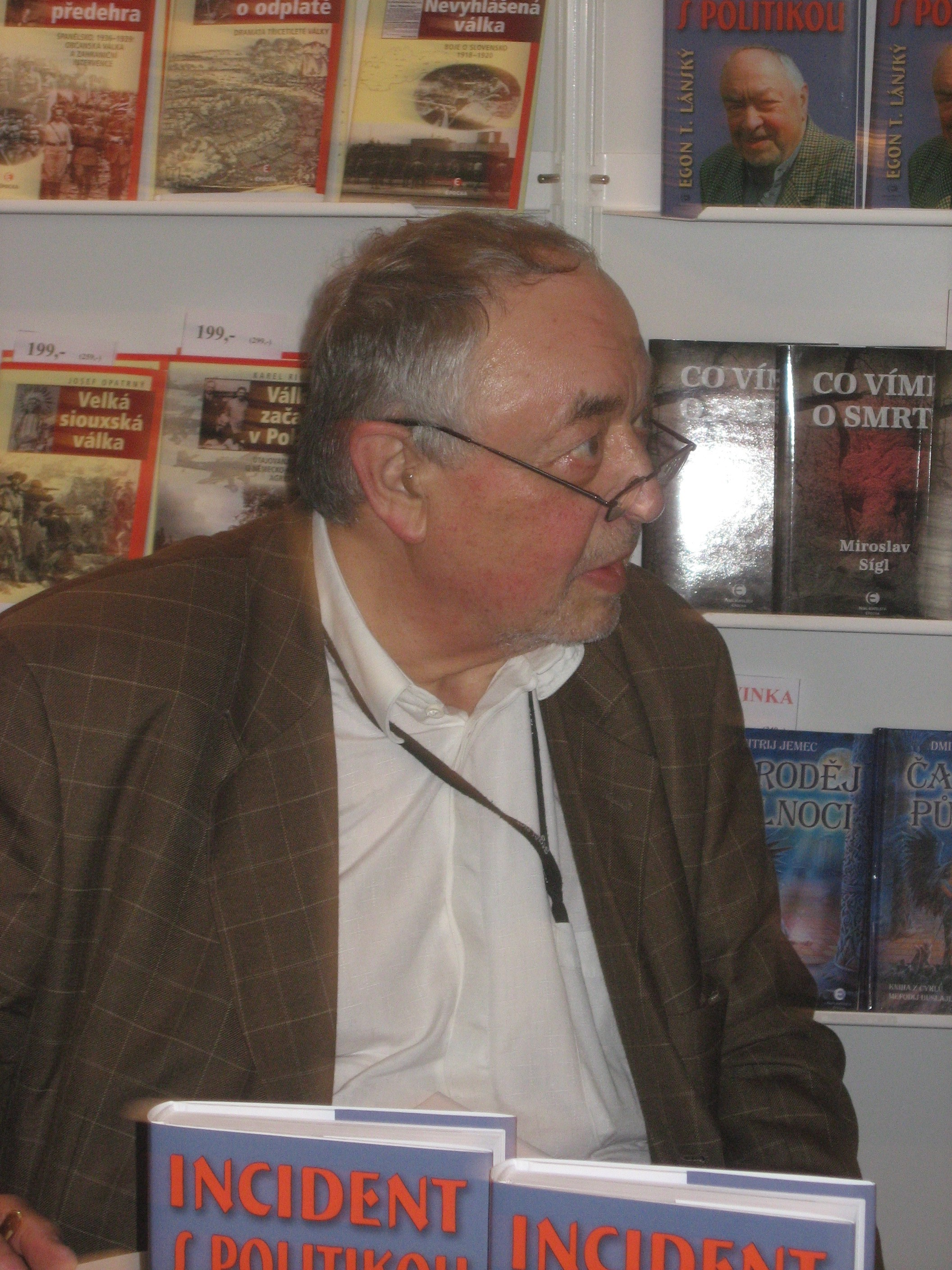
Lánský at a book signing, 2007

In August 1968, he went to Sweden, where he initially worked in various paraprofessionals before he learned Swedish. In the spring of 1968, he became one of the founding members of the Club of Committed Non-Party Members (CCNP). In 1981, he concluded the study of history and political science at Lund University, in Lund.

He also worked as a conservative political commentator for a Swedish newspaper and for a Czechoslovak newsroom from 1981 to 1984, and later as a commentator on Radio Free Europe in Munich, West Germany. He was also active in various movements in Israel, where he co-founded a committee of solidarity with Eastern Europe.

In November 1989, Lánský returned to Czechoslovakia, became the spokesman for the Foreign Ministry and the then Czechoslovak ambassador to the Permanent Mission at the Council of Europe in Strasbourg, and after the split of Czechoslovakia, he asked for Czech citizenship and worked as a consultant and journalist before, in 1995, he became the spokesperson Miloš Zeman, the former chairman of ČSSD.

Also, in 1995, Lánský appeared as a rabbi in the comedy-drama film Golet v údolí.

In the elections of 1996, he was elected Děčín District on the ticket of the Social Democrats Senator, a position he held until the end of the legislative period of 2002. Lánský said:

You can not be a conservative in the Czech Republic if you want to be a decent person. The right wing here does not have what the Tories in Britain, for example, have compassion.

In July 1998, he became deputy chairman of Zeman's government and ministries in charge of coordinating foreign, interior and defense, in particular, but accession negotiations with the European Union. He resigned in late November 1999, as already the second member of this government, and said health reasons. The political opponents, which should also include Miloš Zeman, bandied about the slowness of the accession negotiations and unacknowledged account in Austria.

== Personal life and death ==
Egon Lánský was born as Egon Löwy on 23 July 1934 in Trenčín, Czechoslovakia (now Slovakia), the son of Jewish doctors. His father fled to England in 1939, following the German occupation of Czechoslovakia.

After surviving a concentration camp during World War II, he returned to Trenčín, changed his surname to Lánský and kept his religion. Lánský was fluent in Czech, English, Slovak and Swedish.

Egon Lánský died following a long-term illness on 25 November 2013, aged 79, at a Prague hospital.
