= Josef Geryk =

Czech footballer (1942–2013)

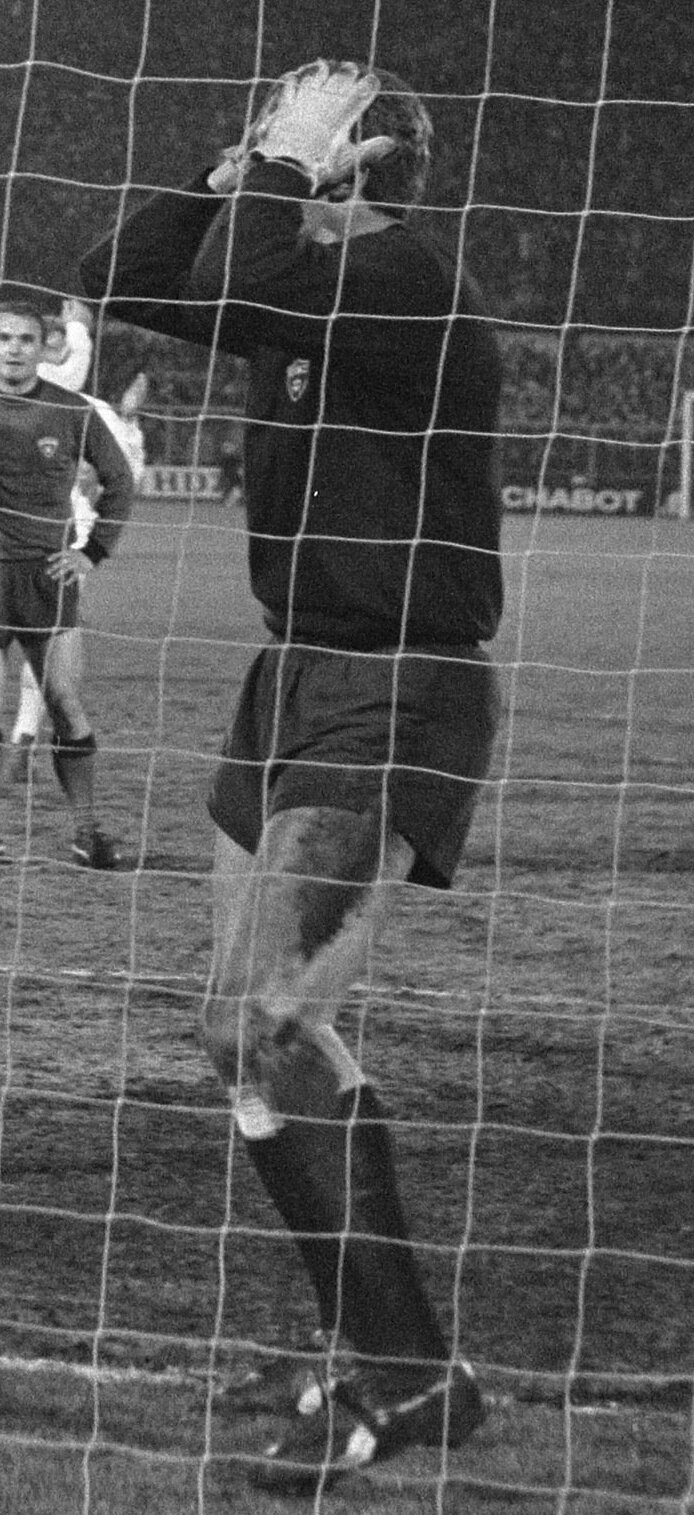
- Geryk with FC Spartak Trnava in 1969

Personal information
- Date of birth: 14 October 1942
- Place of birth: Nový Jičín, Nazi Germany
- Date of death: 27 July 2013 (aged 70)
- Place of death: Červeník, Slovakia
- Position: Goalkeeper

Josef Geryk (14 October 1942 – 27 July 2013) was a Czech football goalkeeper who played for FC Spartak Trnava during the 1960s and 1970s. He won the Czechoslovak championship five times with Spartak from 1968 through 1973.

Geryk was born on 14 October 1942 in Nový Jičín. He died on 27 July 2013 in Červeník.
