= Karel Saitl =

Czech weightlifter (1924–2020)

Karel Saitl (5 November 1924 – 9 January 2020) was a Czech weightlifter who competed for Czechoslovakia in the 1952 Summer Olympics.
