= Bohuslav Kokotek =

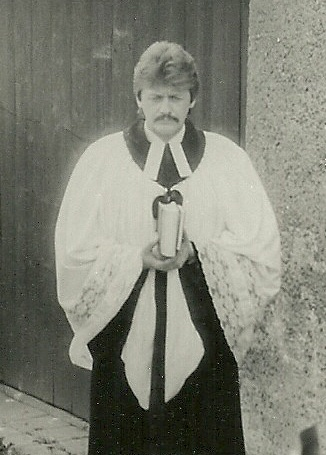
Kokotek in 1987

Bohuslav Kokotek (Polish: Bogusław Kokotek; 16 June 1949 – 24 July 2016) was a Polish Czech Lutheran clergyman, journalist, activist of the Polish minority in the Czech Republic, and local politician.

== Biography ==
Kokotek was born in 1949 in Lyžbice in Czechoslovakia in a Polish Evangelical family, the son of Rudolf and Anna. He graduated from primary school in Třinec with the Polish language, and then a Polish gymnasium in Český Těšín. In his youth, he also took piano lessons for ten years. After graduating from school, he unsuccessfully applied for admission to pedagogical studies at the University of Ostrava. During the Prague Spring, he started studying theology at the Evangelical-Augsburg faculty in Bratislava, after which he was called to perform military service. He served in the air force, i.e. securing flights and in the military staff. He was also the winner of the second place in the national Military Competition of Cultural Creativity. In 1973, he became the ordained minister of the Silesian Evangelical Church of the Augsburg Confession. In the years 1977–1986, he was a pastor in Návsí, while also being the administrator of the parish in the nearby Hrádek. In the years 1986–1993, he served in the parish in Třanovice, from 1991, he was also the administrator of the parish "Na Nivách" in Český Těšín. In 1996, he was elected pastor of the parish "Na Nivách", holding the office until his retirement in October 2011.

In 1993, he launched the ecumenical program "Głos Christjan" on radio in Ostrava. He was also the originator and host of the television program "Cieszyn Christian Minutes", as well as the long-term editor-in-chief of the "Evangelical Calendar" and "Friend" (formerly "Friend of the People"). He was the president of the Evangelical Society in the Czech Republic and the chaplain of the Circle of Polish Combatants in the Czech Republic. He also held the mandate of a councilor of the city of Třinec. He was married and had three children.

In March 2016, the President of the Republic of Poland, Andrzej Duda, awarded Bohuslav Kokotek – for outstanding services in the activities for the Polish community in the Czech Republic, for promoting Polish culture and national traditions – with the Golden Cross of Merit.
