= Zdeněk Mézl =

Czech printmaker

Zdeněk Mézl (31 October 1934 − 23 May 2016) was a Czech printmaker, principally known for his illustrations.

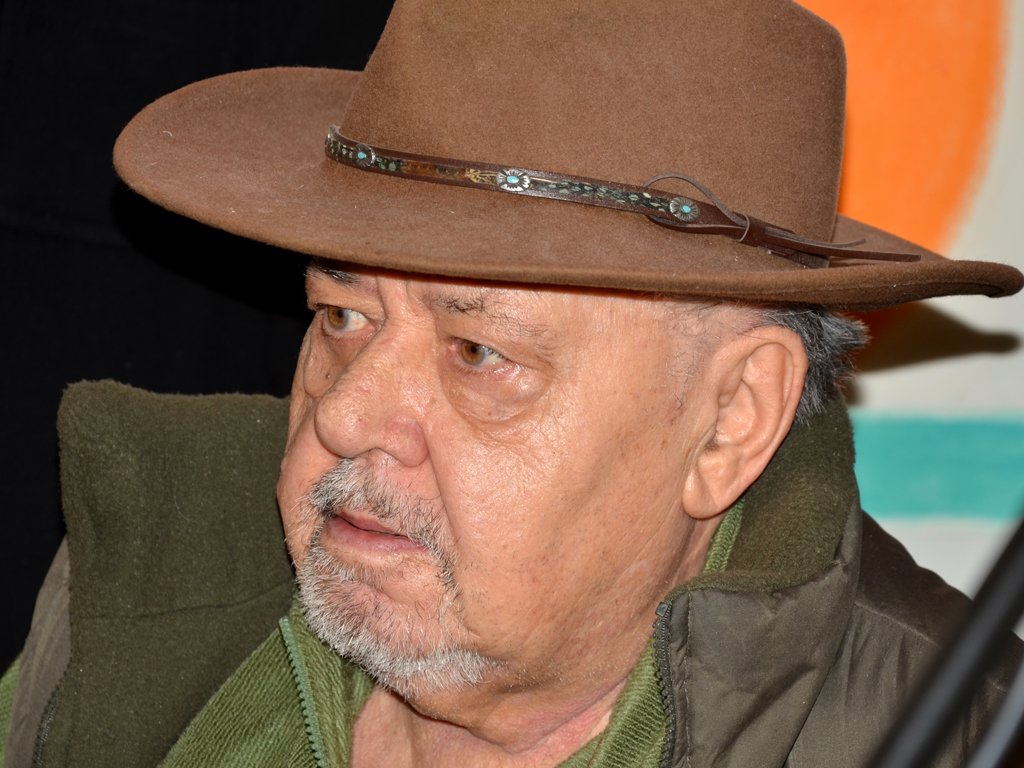
Zdeněk Mézl (2014)

== Career ==
He studied at the College of Applied Arts between 1949–1953 and later graduated from the Academy of Fine Arts, Prague. Mézl illustrated several books using traditional wood engraving.

Among his published books is A Battle for Cathedral or Hey, Slavs!
