= 2021 Světec train crash =

Railway incident in the Czech Republic

Coordinates: 50°34′44.59″N 13°47′51.41″E

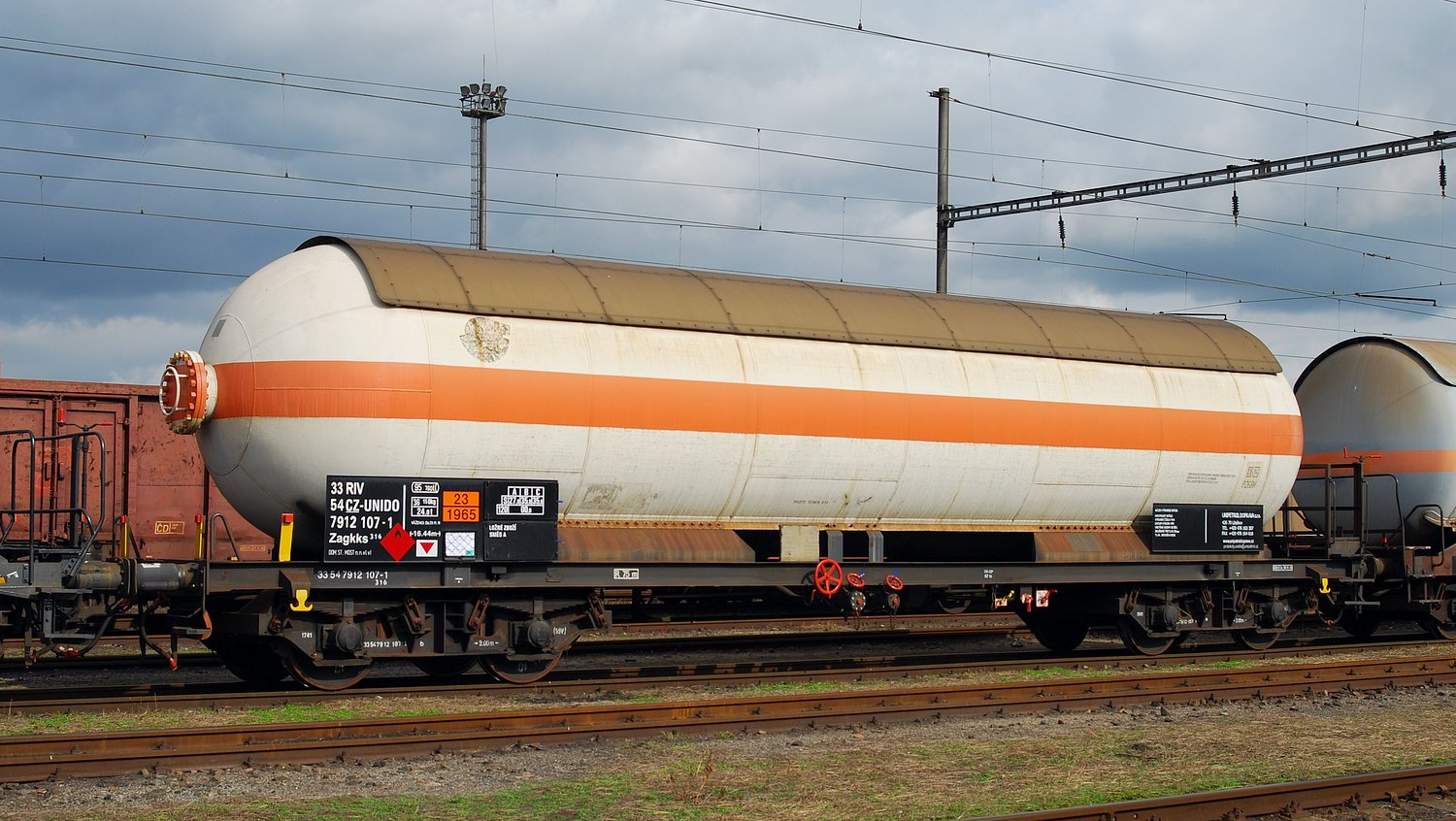
- Unipetrol Doprava tank car in Nymburk, Czech Republic

Details
- Date: 4 April 2021; 14:16
- Location: Světec, Ústí nad Labem Region
- Country: Czech Republic
- Line: Ústí nad Labem – Bílina railway
- Operator: ORLEN Unipetrol Doprava; ČD Cargo; Správa železnic
- Incident type: train collision
- Cause: under investigation (probably fault of a train driver)

Statistics
- Trains: 2
- Passengers: 0
- Deaths: 1
- Injured: 1
- Damage: 50 million CZK

The 2021 Světec train crash was a collision of two freight trains, which occurred at Světec railway station in Světec, Czech Republic on 4 April 2021 at 14:16 CEST. An express freight train (nákladní expres), no. 54334, operated by ORLEN Unipetrol Doprava (UNIDO) and hauled by a CZ Class 753.7, collided with a continuous freight train (průběžný nákladní vlak), no. 66403, operated by ČD Cargo (ČDC) and hauled by a CZ Class 123. The driver of the UNIDO train, which was carrying tank cars filled with propane and butane, died upon impact. The driver of the ČD Cargo train, which was carrying coal, saved himself by jumping out of the locomotive. A fire broke out on one of the locomotives, and 9 firefighter units and an air ambulance responded to the accident. According to preliminary information, the railway signalling had worked correctly, so the accident was probably caused by the UNIDO train driver killed in the crash. The exact cause of the collision is yet to be determined (May 2025).

The total damage was calculated at about 50 million CZK (34 mil. CZK to the UNIDO train, 9 mil. CZK to the ČDC train, 4.5 mil. CZK to the infrastructure).
