= Marek Pivovar =

Czech writer, dramaturge, and playwright (1964–2021)

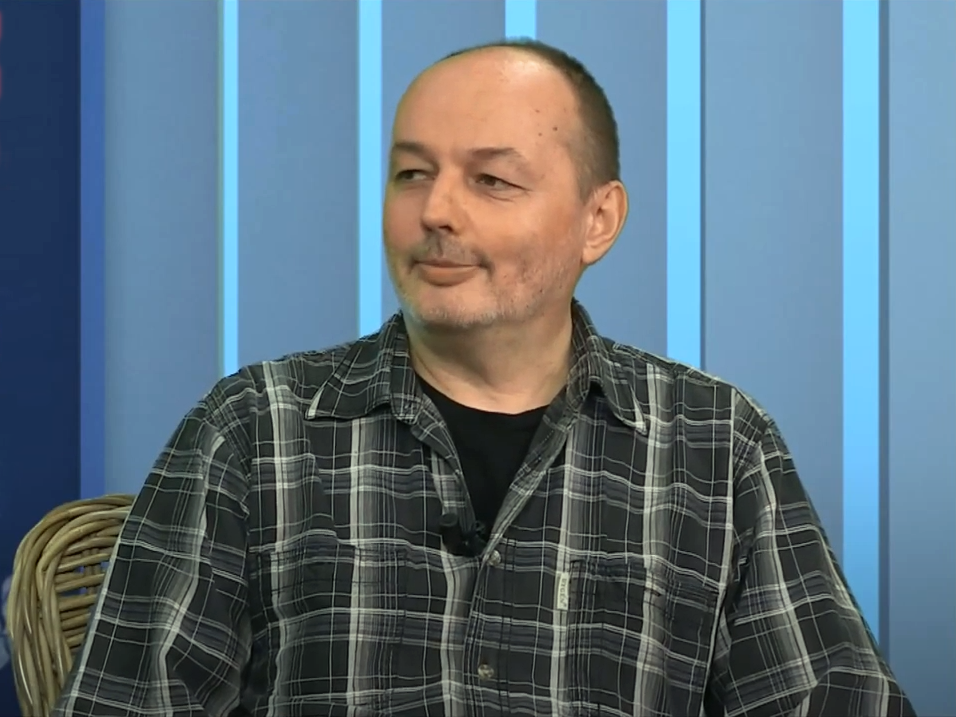
- Marek Pivovar in 2015
- Born: 26 June 1964; Brno, Czechoslovakia
- Died: 2 January 2021 (aged 56); Ostrava, Czech Republic
- Education: Masaryk University
- Occupations: Writer; Dramaturge; Playwright; Radio director

Marek Pivovar (26 June 1964 – 2 January 2021) was a Czech writer, dramaturge, playwright and radio director.

== Biography ==
Pivovar studied Czech language, history, and theatre studies at Masaryk University in Brno. From 1994 to 2017, he was the dramaturg of the National Moravian-Silesian Theatre in Ostrava. He also became dramaturg of the Mahen Theatre. In 2017, he left the Moravian-Silesian Theatre due to illness and focused on freelance writing.

Marek Pivovar died in Ostrava on 2 January 2021, at the age of 56 after a long illness from COVID-19 complications during the COVID-19 pandemic in the Czech Republic.
