= Václav Glazar =

Czech actor (1952–2018)

- Born: 9 October 1952; Prague, Czechoslovakia
- Died: 11 July 2018 (aged 65); Kralupy nad Vltavou, Czech Republic
- Notable work: Rok ďábla (2002); Příběhy slavných (2002); Kameňák (2003); Kameňák 2 (2004); Kameňák 3 (2005); Vichřice mezi životem a smrtí (2005); Skeletoni (2007)

Václav Glazar (9 October 1952 – 11 July 2018) was a Czech film and theater actor, playwright, screenwriter and cabaretteer.

== Life ==
He was born in Prague in 1952, and his first profession was dog breeding and postal delivery. In 1990, he began his career as a playwright and screenwriter.

He first showed his first work, Čestmír Kopecky, on Česká televize and then participated in the entertainment programs TV Prima.

In 2003 he wrote Heart and Stone, which starred Jiřina Kottová and Jaroslav Čejka. He worked here as an artistic director, an entertainer, actor and singer. He also performed in some TV and film roles.

He first appeared in front of the camera in 2002, in the movie Rok ďábla. Then, in his trilogy based on the known anecdotes called Kameňák, he cast Zdeněk Troška and directed the film Skeletoni .

On 11 July 2018 he died of a cardiac arrest.

== Filmography ==
=== Films ===
Movies

- 2002 – Rok ďábla
- 2003 – Kameňák
- 2004 – Kameňák 2
- 2005 – Kameňák 3
- 2007 – Skeletoni

Television Movies

- 2005 – Vichřice mezi životem a smrtí

TV Shows

- 2002 – Příběhy slavných
