= Stanislav Rudolf =

Czech writer, screenwriter, and journalist (1932–2022)

- Born: 16 February 1932; Jičín, Czechoslovakia
- Died: 8 January 2022 (aged 89); Brandýs nad Labem-Stará Boleslav, Czechia
- Education: University of South Bohemia; Charles University
- Occupation: Writer

Stanislav Rudolf (16 February 1932 – 8 January 2022) was a Czech writer, screenwriter and journalist.

== Life and career ==
Born in Jičín, Rudolf graduated in Educational Sciences at the University of South Bohemia in České Budějovice, working as a primary school teacher in Písek. In the second half of the 1950s he studied Czech and pedagogy at the Charles University in Prague, and became a university assistant of Czech literature at the Brandýs nad Labem department of the Charles University.

After having worked as an editor for the magazines Pionýrské noviny and Květy, in 1969 he made his literary debut with the novel Metráček aneb Nemožně tlustá holka ("Little Fatty or the Impossibly Fat Girl"). His novels were often set in school environments and had female teenage characters as main protagonists. Several of his books including his debut novel were adapted into films, and Rudolf himself worked as a screenwriter in films and television.

Rudolf died in Brandýs nad Labem-Stará Boleslav on 8 January 2022, at the age of 89.
