= Zuzana Brabcová =

Czech writer

Zuzana Brabcová (23 March 1959 – 20 August 2015) was a Czech writer.

The daughter of Jiří Brabec and Zina Trochová, both literary historians, she was born in Prague. After completing her schooling, she worked in the University Library in Prague, in a hospital and as a cleaner. She later became an editor, working for several publishing houses.

Her first novel Daleko od stromu (Far from the tree) was first published in a Samizdat edition in 1984 and then in Prague in 1991. It received the Jiří Orten Award in 1997. This was followed by the novel Zlodějina (Thievery) in 1996. In 2000, she published her third novel Rok perel (Year of pearls), the first Czech novel to deal with lesbian love.

Brabcová was awarded the Magnesia Litera for fiction in 2013 for her novel Stropy.
