= Jaroslav Malina (scenographer) =

Jaroslav Malina (5 December 1937 – 14 May 2016) was a Czech scenographer.

Born in Prague in 1937, Malina studied at the Pedagogical Faculty of Charles University from 1957 to 1961, then at the Academy of Fine Arts, from which he graduated in 1964, and at the Prague Academy of Performing Arts.

Malina served on the teaching staff at universities in the United States, Japan, Finland, and Great Britain. In 1990 he became a teacher at the Academy of Fine Arts and was its president from 1996 to 1998. He was the commissioner-in-chief of the Prague Quadrennial in 1991, 1999, and 2003.

Malina's career covered more than 40 years and included more than 450 scenographic works and costumes for theatre, film, and television, as well as 30 solo exhibitions of his scenographic works, paintings, graphics, and posters. His work away from the stage, or "free work", as he called it, was inextricably tied to his on-stage work. In his later years, his operatic projects were performed in Germany and Italy.

His work is represented in the collections of the National Gallery of Prague, the National Museum, the Museum of Decorative Arts, the Czech Museum of Music, and the Arts and Theatre Institute. His works can be seen at the Theatre Research Institute at Ohio State University, at the Performing Arts Library and Museum in San Francisco, and in many public and private collections in the United States and elsewhere.
