= Petr Pokorný (theologian) =

Czech professor and theologian (1933–2020)

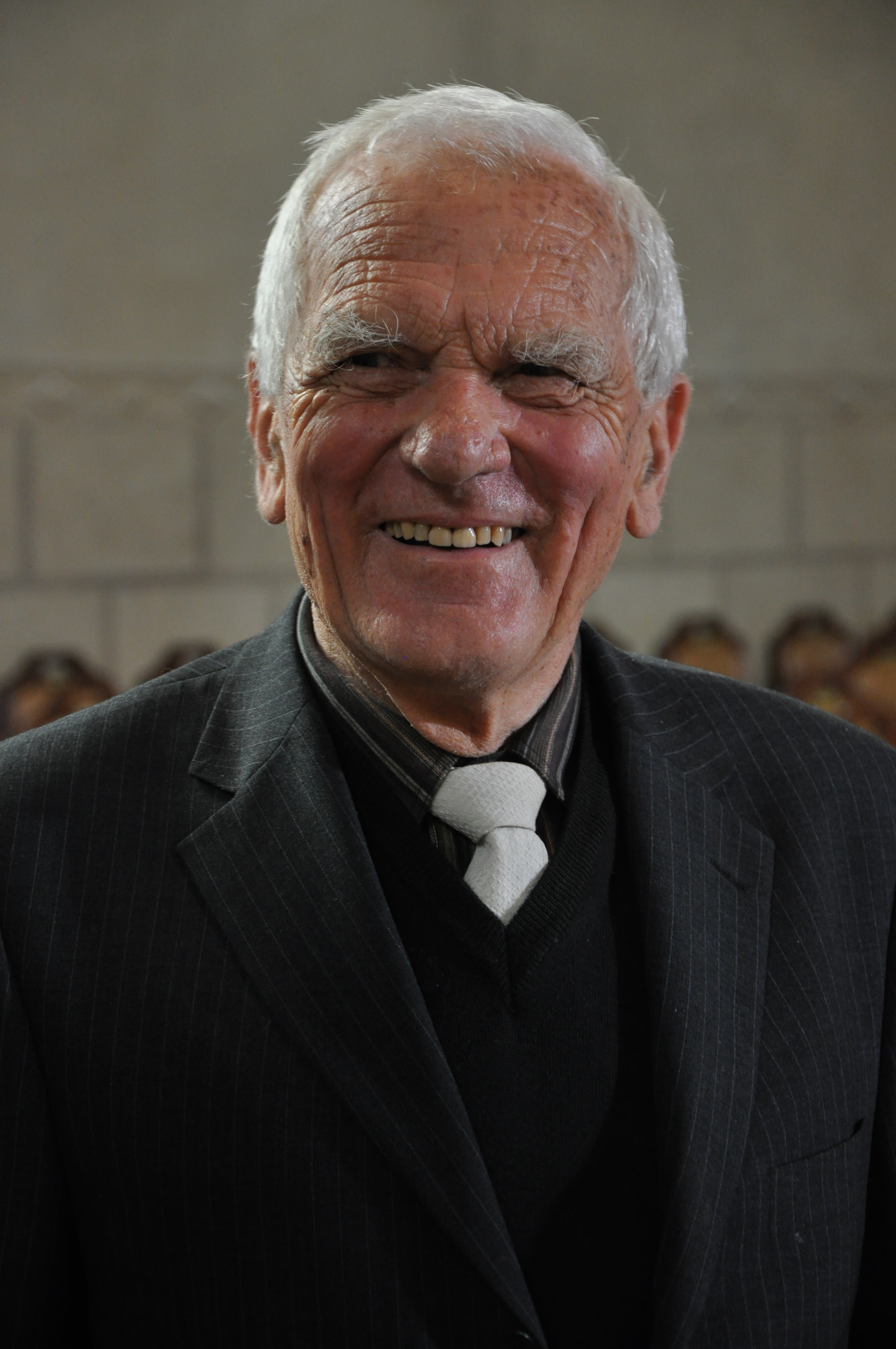
- Petr Pokorný (2014)
- Born: April 21, 1933; Brno, Czechoslovakia
- Died: January 18, 2020 (aged 86)
- Education: Charles University, Prague
- Occupations: Professor, theologian, pastor
- Theological work
- Tradition or movement: Protestant theology, Evangelical Church of Czech Brethren
- Main interests: Biblical studies, New Testament studies, Hermeneutics

Petr Pokorný (April 21, 1933 – January 18, 2020) was a Protestant theologian, professor at Charles University in Prague, and pastor of the Evangelical Church of Czech Brethren, one of the leading biblical scholars in the Czech Republic.

For many years, Petr Pokorný led the Department of New Testament Studies at the Protestant Theological Faculty of the Prague University, in 1996–1999 he was the dean of the faculty, later (1998–2010) he was also the director of the Centre for Biblical Studies of the Czech Academy of Sciences and Charles University.

== Selected publications ==
=== Publications in English ===
- The Genesis of Christology: Foundations for a Theology of the New Testament, Edinburgh: T. & T. Clark, 1987. ISBN 0567291448
- Jesus in the Eyes of His Followers: Newly Discovered Manuscripts and Old Christian Confessions, North Richland Hills, Tex.: BIBAL Press, 1998. ISBN 0941037657
- A Commentary on the Gospel of Thomas: From Interpretations to the Interpreted, New York: T & t Clark Ltd., 2009. ISBN 0567502503
- Hermeneutics as a Theory of Understanding, Grand Rapids: W.B. Eerdmans Pub., 2011. ISBN 0802827217
- From the Gospel to the Gospels. History, Theology and Impact of the Biblical Term 'Euangelion', Berlin: Walter de Gruyter, 2013. ISBN 3110300605

=== Publications in German ===
- Der Epheserbrief und die Gnosis. Berlin: Evangelische Verlaganstalt, 1965.
- Der Gottessohn: Literarische Übersicht und Fragestellung. Zürich: Theologischer Verlag, 1971.
- Die Entstehung der Christologie. Voraussetzungen einer Theologie des Neuen Testaments, Stuttgart: Calwer, 1985.
- Der Brief des Paulus an die Kolosser, Berlin: Evangelische Verlagsanstalt, 1987. ISBN 3-374-00350-8
- Der Brief des Paulus an die Epheser, Berlin: Evangelische Verlagsanstalt, 1992. ISBN 3-374-01389-9
- Bibelauslegung als Theologie (with Josef Bohumil Souček), Tübingen: Mohr Siebeck, 1997. ISBN 9783161467660
- Theologie der lukanischen Schriften, Goettingen: Vandenhoeck & Ruprecht, 1998. ISBN 3-525-53861-8
- Einleitung in das Neue Testament. Seine Literatur und Theologie im Überblick (with Ulrich Heckel), Tübingen: Mohr Siebeck, 2007. ISBN 978-3-16-148011-9
- Jesus in Geschichte und Bekenntnis, Tübingen: Mohr Siebeck, 2016. ISBN 9783161542879

=== Publications in Czech ===
- Počátky gnose. Vznik gnostického mýtu o božstvu Člověk, Praha: Academia, 1968.
- Píseň o perle: tajné knihy starověkých gnostiků, Praha: Vyšehrad, 1986.
- Literární a teologický úvod do Nového zákona, Praha: Vyšehrad, 1993. ISBN 80-7021-052-4
- Řecké dědictví v Orientu. Helénismus v Egyptě a Sýrii, Praha: Oikúmené, 1993. ISBN 80-85241-50-1
- Apoštolské vyznání. Výklad nejstarších křesťanských věroučných textů. Třebenice: Mlýn, 1994. ISBN 80-901589-2-7
- Co nevíš o Bibli? Úvod do studia Starého a Nového zákona (with Miloš Bič), Praha: Česká biblická společnost, 1997. ISBN 80-85810-25-5
