= Jan Korger =

Czech medical doctor and politician

Jan Korger (3 November 1937 – 13 May 2016) was a Czech medical doctor and politician for the Civic Democratic Party. He served in the House of Peoples of the Federal Assembly of Czechoslovakia in 1992, the last year of its existence. He went on to serve in the municipal government of Šumperk.
