= Antonín Přidal =

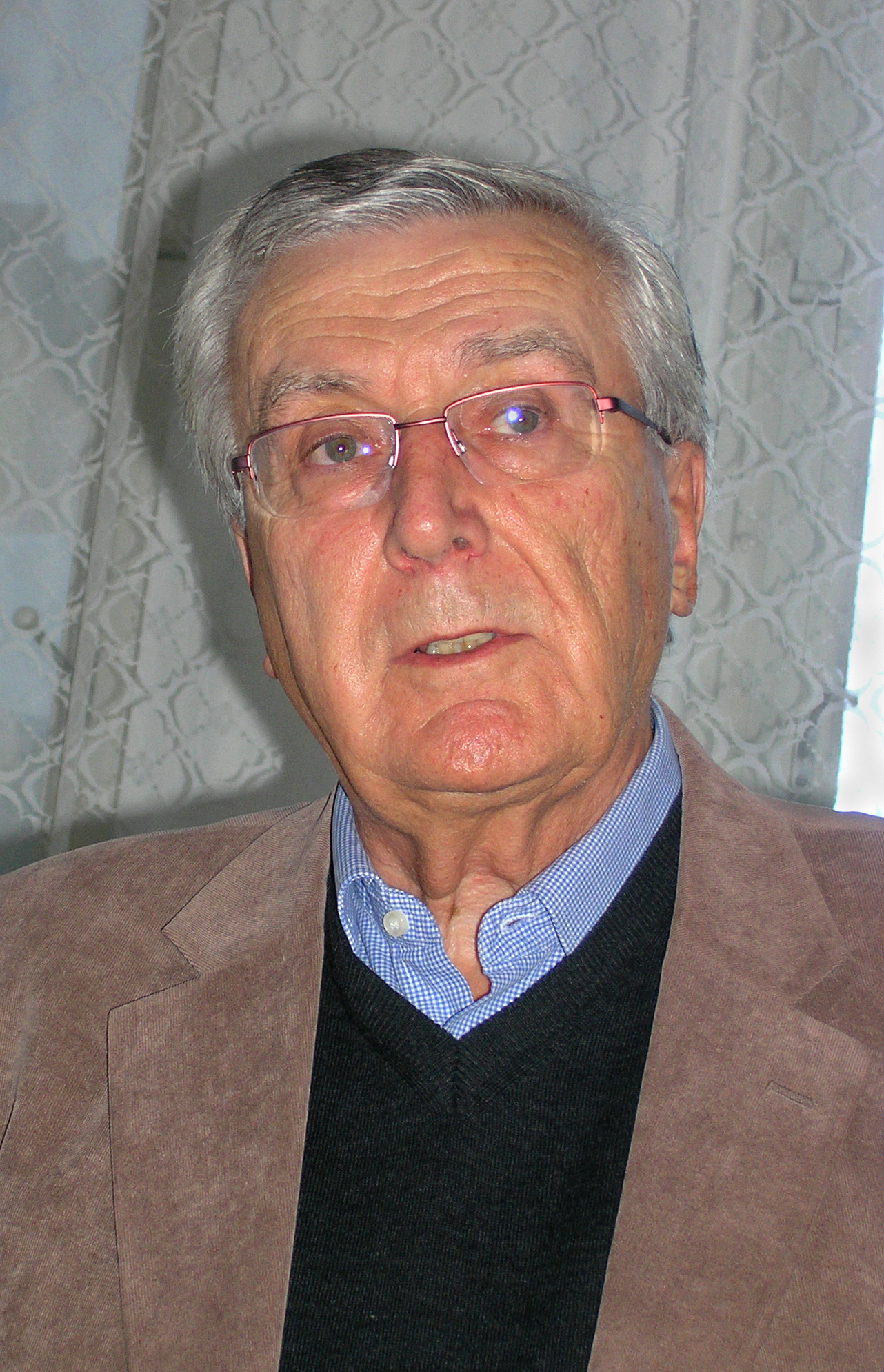
Antonín Přidal in 2011

Antonín Přidal (13 October 1935 – 7 February 2017) was a Czech translator, writer, journalist and university lecturer. He translated from English, Spanish and French.

== Life ==
Přidal was born on 13 October 1935 in Prostějov, Czechoslovakia. He attended grammar school in Uherské Hradiště. After graduation, he studied, from 1953 to 1958, English and Hispanic Studies at Masaryk University in Brno. In 1982, he received his doctorate.

He collaborated with Czech Radio in Brno from 1960 to 1970. There, he was the author of cycles and a small school of poetry, Shakespeare for beginners and ramblings about books and music, and the co-author of the show See you on Saturday. From the late 1960s are particularly important his radio play All my votes and the Fates. He briefly worked as a script editor at Barrandov Studios from 1990 to 1991.

Subsequently, he worked at the Theatre Faculty of Janáček Academy of Music and Performing Arts (since 1991 as an associate professor and since 1993 as a professor) in the studio of radio and television drama and screenwriting.

In 1998, he received the Prize of Ferdinand Peroutka. In 2007, he was awarded the State Prize for translation work.

He died in Brno on 7 February 2017.

== Works ==
Přidal is a noted author of Czech radio plays. His most notable works include Všechny moje hlasy (1967) and Sudičky (1968). Brno-based publisher Větrné issued, in 2006, a selection of his four radio and theatre plays: Políček č. 111, Atentát v přízemí, Noční žokej, Elektrický nůž, and Noc potom.

In the early nineties, he was also the author and presenter of the TV series Klub Netopýr and Z očí do očí.

He also wrote essays and philosophical works. In 2008, Second City Committee published of his texts - mostly anonymous - Kouzlo nechtěného. The committee also came out with texts from his radio series Potulky knihami a časem (Barrister and Principal, 2011). In 2015, he published a collection of poems, Zpovědi a odposlechy.

His translations provided Czech readers with English and Spanish writings of poetry and drama. He translated a number of major prose works of modern English and American literature. The translated books were usually enriched with comprehensive commentary. He is known especially his translation of Leo Rosten's O K*A*P*L*A*N! My K*A*P*L*A*N!.
