= Jan Kantůrek =

Czech translator (1948–2018)

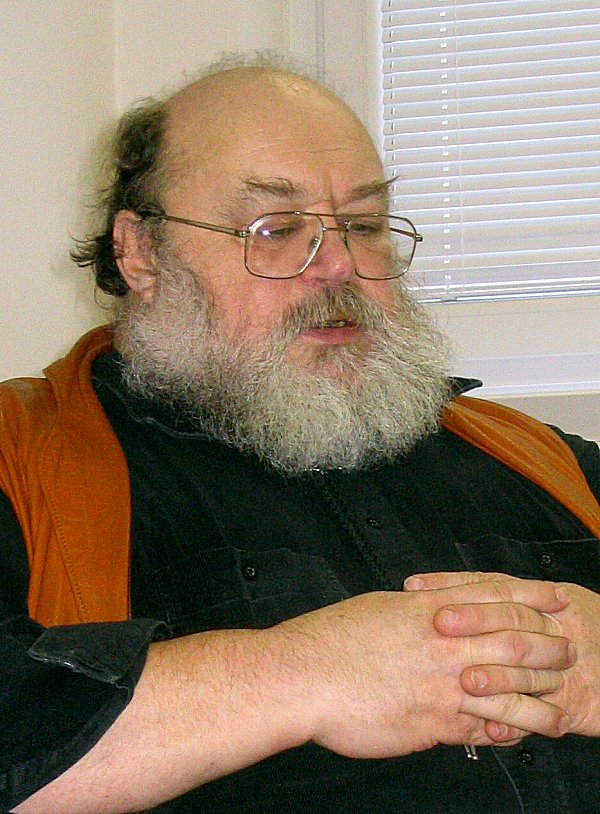
- Kantůrek in 2006
- Born: Jan Kantůrek; 4 May 1948; Zlín, Czechoslovakia (now Zlín, Czech Republic)
- Died: 22 March 2018 (aged 69); Prague, Czech Republic
- Occupations: Translator, writer
- Writing career
- Language: Czech
- Years active: 1975–2018
- Genres: Fantasy, science fiction

Jan Kantůrek (4 May 1948 – 22 March 2018) was a Czech translator and writer. His most known translations are Discworld by Terry Pratchett and books about Conan the Barbarian by Robert E. Howard and his successors.

== Life ==
He was married with two children and lived in Prague. Between 1975 and 1990, Kantůrek worked as a copy editor in the Artia publishing house. From 1990 to 1992, he worked as a director of marketing department in the Aventinum publishing house. Since 1992, he worked as a translator.

In 1984, he co-re-established a fan club of Jules Verne, and started translating for its fanzines. He was a comic collector and, according to his own words, he could read English but not speak it.

He also performed as the Librarian in theatrical productions of Pratchett's books. He was awarded "Best Translator" by the Czech Academy of science fiction, fantasy and horrors in 1995, 1996, 1997, and 1999. Discworld was awarded "Best Book Series" in the same years. In 2003, he received an award for his lifetime work in science fiction by the Academy.
