= Zdeněk Altner =

- Born: 3 October 1947
- Died: 7 November 2016 (aged 69)
- Occupations: Lawyer and advocate
- Known for: Lawsuit against the Czech Social Democratic Party
- Website: Altner's blog

Zdeněk Altner (3 October 1947 – 7 November 2016) was a Czech lawyer and advocate.

== Career ==
Altner is known for filing a suit against the Czech Social Democratic Party (ČSSD) regarding their non-payment of fees owed for services rendered in a dispute over the ownership of the party headquarters in 2001. Altner said he should receive 165 million Czech koruna (3.3 million Euros) for the job. ČSSD didn't pay the bill, and with fines and late-payment penalties, the amount of the debt rose to almost 20 billion Kč.

The high penalty was disputed by ČSSD leader Jiří Paroubek, who offered 4.4 million Euros as a settlement.
