= Deaths in January 2026 =

The following is a list of notable deaths in January 2026.

Entries for each day are listed alphabetically by surname. A typical entry lists information in the following sequence:

- Name, age, country of citizenship at birth, subsequent country of citizenship (if applicable), reason for notability, cause of death (if known), and reference.

== January 2026 ==
=== 1 ===
- Stuart Altman, 88, American economist.
- Marat Amankulov, 55, Kyrgyz politician, MP (2015–2021).
- Yvan Aumont, 87, French engineer and journalist (Lys rouge).
- Alan Baker, 81, English footballer (Aston Villa).
- Bobby Baxter, 88, English footballer (Brighton & Hove Albion, Darlington, Torquay United).
- Allyn Bromley, 97, American visual artist and art educator.
- Margaret Bullock, 92, Australian physiotherapist.
- Xesús Cañedo, 67, Spanish politician, co-founder of the Partíu Asturianista.
- Lana Chornohorska, 26, Ukrainian soldier.
- Diane Crump, 77, American jockey and horse trainer, glioblastoma.
- Nexhat Daci, 81, Kosovan politician, acting president (2006) and chairman of the Assembly (2001–2006).
- Brian Doyle, 90, Canadian writer.
- Yehezkel Dror, 97, Austrian-born Israeli political scientist.
- Imants Freibergs, 91, Latvian computer scientist, first gentleman (1999–2007).
- James Grauerholz, 73, American writer, pneumonia.
- Mohammed Harbi, 92, Algerian historian.
- Huang Dongbi, 86, Chinese diplomat.
- Morris Kahn, 95, South African-born Israeli telecommunications industry executive, founder of Golden Pages, Amdocs and the Aurec Group.
- Harvey C. Krautschun, 76, American politician, member of the South Dakota House of Representatives (1985–1996).
- Hiroshi Kume, 81, Japanese television host, lung cancer.
- John Langdon, 79, American typographer and graphic designer.
- Arno Liiver, 71, Estonian actor (Spring, Summer, Autumn).
- Arnold Long, 85, British cricketer (Sussex, MCC, Surrey), cancer.
- Volodymyr Marchenko, 103, Ukrainian mathematician (Marchenko equation, Marchenko–Pastur distribution).
- Hélio Mauro, 83, Brazilian politician, deputy (1975–1978), mayor of Goiânia (1978–1979), cardiac arrest.
- Paul McCullagh Jr., 25, Northern Irish boxer, bone cancer.
- Colin McDonald, 95, English footballer (Burnley, Headington United, national team).
- Mukhsin Mukhamadiev, 59, Tajik-Russian football player (Tajikistan national team, Russia national team) and manager (Tajikistan national team).
- Sir James Munby, 77, English judge, president of the Family Division (2013–2018), heart attack.
- Hubertus von Pilgrim, 94, German sculptor.
- Gregory de Polnay, 82, English actor (Dixon of Dock Green, Doctor Who, Howards' Way).
- Dame Karen Poutasi, 76, New Zealand public health official, director general of health (1995–2006).
- Candy Raymond, 75, Australian actress (Don's Party, Number 96, Prisoner). (death announced on this date)
- Amit Saar, 47, Israeli intelligence officer, head of the Military Intelligence Research Department (2020–2024), brain cancer.
- Roland Schäfer, 76, German politician, mayor of Bergkamen (1998–2020), complications from a cerebral haemorrhage.
- Serafim Shyngo-Ya-Hombo, 80, Angolan Roman Catholic prelate, auxiliary bishop of Luanda (1990–1992) and bishop of Mbanza Congo (1992–2008).
- Margaret Anne Staggers, 79, American politician, member of the West Virginia House of Delegates (2007–2014).
- Hessy Levinsons Taft, 91, German chemist and child model.
- Linda S. Wilson, 89, American academic administrator, president of Radcliffe College (1989–1999).
- Ruben Yesayan, 79, Russian-Armenian test pilot.
- Yuen Cheung-yan, 68, Hong Kong actor (The Miracle Fighters, Drunken Tai Chi, Flying Dagger), director, and martial arts choreographer.
- Valentin Zakharov, 92, Russian figure skater.

=== 2 ===
- Ritva Auvinen, 93, Finnish opera singer.
- Ian Balding, 87, British horse trainer.
- Sukumar Barua, 87, Bangladeshi poet.
- Shyam Bihari Lal, 60, Indian politician, Uttar Pradesh MLA (since 2017), heart attack.
- Carmen Arnold Biucchi, 78, Swiss numismatist and archaeologist.
- Dominique Bucchini, 82, French politician, MEP (1979–1984) and mayor of Sartène (1977–2001).
- Tony Carr, 98, Maltese session drummer and percussionist (CCS, Hot Chocolate).
- Jean-Max Causse, 85, French actor (I Stand Alone).
- Bohdan Chufus, 75, Ukrainian journalist, actor and singer.
- Jenny Collins, 83, English radio presenter (BBC Radio Merseyside).
- Sir Patrick Duffy, 105, British politician, MP (1963–1966, 1970–1992) and president of the NATO Assembly (1988–1990).
- Toshio Fujii, 83, Japanese politician, member of the House of Councillors (1998–2004), heart failure.
- Francis Grant, 101, British marine and World War II veteran.
- Stephen E. Haggerty, 87, American geophysicist.
- Evan Hammond, 45, Canadian radio host and sports broadcaster (CJAV-FM), stroke.
- Sidney Kibrick, 97, American actor (Our Gang).
- Kristi Kiick, 58, American academic, leiomyosarcoma.
- Elbert Kimbrough, 87, American football player (San Francisco 49ers, Los Angeles Rams, New Orleans Saints).
- Anna Kurek, 96, Polish nurse and Warsaw Uprising participant.
- Paul C. Lambert, 97, American diplomat, ambassador to Ecuador (1990–1992).
- Barbara Lawrence, 82, American talent manager.
- Johnny Legend, 77, American rockabilly musician, film producer and wrestling manager, stroke and heart failure.
- Vladimir Lukić, 92, Bosnian Serb politician, prime minister of Republika Srpska (1993–1994).
- Desmond McConnell, 95, British mineralogist.
- David E. Mitchell, 75, American medical activist, founder of Patients for Affordable Drugs Now, multiple myeloma.
- Ashok Gajanan Modak, 85, Indian politician and academic, Maharashtra MLC (1994–2006).
- Con Pederson, 91, American visual effects artist (2001: A Space Odyssey, Jay and Silent Bob Strike Back, Garfield: The Movie).
- Valery Fyodorovich Plotnikov, 82, Russian photographer.
- Tim Robertson, 81, English-born Australian actor (Chances, Australia You're Standing In It, Stingers). (death announced on this date)
- Lajos Rovátkay, 92, Hungarian-born German harpsichordist and musicologist.
- Saleh Rusheidat, 80, Jordanian politician, member of the House of Representatives (1993–1997) and Senate (since 2009).
- Edith Renfrow Smith, 111, American supercentenarian.
- Phoenix Spicer, 23, Australian footballer (North Melbourne), brain aneurysm.
- Bob Taylor, 94, Australian footballer (Essendon).
- Ivanne Trebbi, 97, Italian partisan and politician, deputy (1979–1987).
- Jim Willis, 98, American baseball player (Chicago Cubs).
- Horst Witzler, 93, German football manager (Schwarz-Weiß Essen, Borussia Dortmund, Alemannia Aachen).
- Robert Wolski, 43, Polish Olympic high jumper (2004), traffic collision.
- Nellie Wong, 91, American poet.
- Mirosław Zdanowicz, 88, Polish social activist.

=== 3 ===
- Hushang Ansary, 98, Iranian-American diplomat and politician, minister of finance (1974–1977) and information (1971–1974), ambassador to the United States (1967–1969), cardiac arrest.
- Jamil Azar, 89, Jordanian journalist and broadcaster, founder of Al Jazeera.
- Dietmar Bachmann, 91, Austrian politician, member of the Landtag of Tyrol (1965–1994).
- Claude-Inga Barbey, 64, Swiss comedian, writer, and actress (The Death of Mario Ricci).
- Stephen E. Braude, 80, American philosopher.
- Natale Carlotto, 94, Italian politician, senator (1987–1994) and deputy (1976–1987).
- Francesco Paolo Casavola, 94, Italian jurist, president of the Constitutional Court (1992–1995).
- Frédéric Cerdal, 81, French actor and stage director.
- Maria Eugènia Cuenca, 78, Spanish politician, member of the Catalan parliament (1999–2006) and the Congress of Deputies (1986–1992).
- Anthony Fletcher, 84, British historian.
- Gerry Gable, 88, British political activist and magazine editor (Searchlight).
- Franz Herre, 99, German journalist and biographer.
- Marvalene Hughes, 88, American educator and academic administrator, president of California State University, Stanislaus (1994–2005) and Dillard University (2005–2011).
- Mesut İktu, 78, Turkish operatic baritone.
- Hernán Giraldo Jaramillo, 89, Colombian Roman Catholic prelate, auxiliary bishop of Pereira (1984–1987), bishop of Málaga–Soatá (1987–2001) and of Buga (2001–2012).
- Nālani Kanakaʻole, 79, American kumu hula.
- Latif Karimi, Iranian protester, Islamic Revolutionary Guard Corps brigadier general, shot.
- David M. Maddox, 87, American army general.
- Guðmundur Oddur Magnússon, 70, Icelandic artist and academic.
- Sir Graham McCamley, 93, Australian beef producer.
- John Meredith, 85, English footballer (Doncaster Rovers, Chesterfield, Gillingham).
- Errol Moorcroft, 85, South African politician, member of the House of Assembly (1981–1987, 1989–1994) and National Assembly (1999–2004).
- Ahmed Moujahid, Moroccan footballer (Wydad Casablanca, national team).
- Dastagir Hossain Nira, 60, Bangladeshi footballer (Dhaka Abahani, Mohammedan, national team), cardiac arrest.
- Pa O'Dwyer, 40, Irish strongman.
- Sverre Anker Ousdal, 81, Norwegian actor (Insomnia, Flight of the Eagle, The Last Place on Earth).
- Andrzej Paczkowski, 87, Polish historian.
- Dimitar Penev, 80, Bulgarian football player (CSKA Sofia, national team) and manager (national team).
- Jenny Plocki, 100, French women's rights activist.
- Rolf Riehm, 88, German composer (Sirenen), oboist and academic (Musikhochschule Frankfurt).
- Randy Riley, 63, American librarian.
- Eva Schloss, 96, Austrian-British Holocaust survivor and memoirist.
- Robert K. Tanenbaum, 83, American trial attorney and novelist, mayor of Beverly Hills, California (1988–1989, 1992–1993), cancer.
- Nam Singh Thapa, 79, Nepali Olympic boxer (1964), cancer.
- Samuel O. Thier, 88, American doctor and academic, president of Brandeis University (1991–1994).
- Ivan Varshavsky, 87, Russian engineer and railway track foreman.
- Wang Zheng, 64, Chinese vice admiral.
- Terry Wharton, 83, English footballer (Wolverhampton Wanderers, Bolton Wanderers, Crystal Palace).
- William H. Yohn Jr., 90, American jurist and politician, judge of the U.S. District Court for the Eastern District of Pennsylvania (since 1991), member of the Pennsylvania House of Representatives (1968–1980).
- Amal Fathullah Zarkasyi, 76, Indonesian Muslim scholar.
- Hugo Zemp, 88, Swiss-French ethnomusicologist.
- Zhang Kerang, 78, Chinese Peking opera actor.

=== 4 ===
- Forest Able, 93, American basketball player (Syracuse Nationals).
- Ali Abu Al-Ragheb, 79, Jordanian politician, prime minister (2000–2003).
- Fazalur Raheem Ashrafi, 81, Pakistani Islamic scholar, patron of Wifaq-ul-Madaris al-Arabia.
- Céline Bellot, 55, Canadian criminologist and academic, breast cancer.
- Mario Blasone, 85, Italian basketball player and basketball coach.
- Bob Boyer, 93, Canadian professional wrestler.
- David Branch, 77, Canadian ice hockey administrator, commissioner of the OHL (1979–2024) and president of the CHL (1996–2019).
- Tom Britt, 89, American interior designer.
- Zoraida Burgos i Matheu, 92, Spanish writer.
- Calbo, 52, French rapper (Ärsenik), cancer.
- Larry M. Cherry, 69, American hairstylist (Ma Rainey's Black Bottom, Malcolm X, Do the Right Thing).
- Germaine Cousin-Zermatten, 100, Swiss herbalist.
- Jim Dennison, 87, American football coach (Akron Zips, Walsh Cavaliers).
- Kamiel Dierckx, 84, Belgian basketball player (Belgian Lions).
- Frank Dunlop, 98, British theatre director.
- Manuel Fernández Ilarraza, 85, Spanish gynaecologist and politician, president of the Parliament of La Rioja (1987–1988).
- Miloslav Fiala, 97, Czech Roman Catholic priest.
- Andy Friendly, 74, American television producer (Entertainment Tonight).
- John Gaisford, 91, British Anglican bishop, Bishop of Beverley (1994–2000).
- L. Ganesan, 91, Indian politician, MP (1980–1986, 2004–2009).
- Anne-Claire Goulon, 51, French businesswoman, breast cancer.
- Vicki L. Gregory, 75, American academic and librarian.
- Michel Griffon, 77, French agronomist.
- Roger Guesnerie, 82, French economist and academic.
- Claire Hall, 66, American politician.
- Denise Harlow, 55, American politician, member of the Maine House of Representatives (2010–2018), cancer.
- Bobby Holmes, 93, Scottish footballer (St Mirren).
- Nora Ikstena, 56, Latvian writer and cultural manager.
- Klaus Keitel, 86, German politician, member (1990–2002) and president (1990–1998) of the Landtag of Saxony-Anhalt.
- John Kershaw, 4th Baron Kershaw, 89, British hereditary peer, member of the House of Lords (1968–1999).
- Kim Young-in, 85, South Korean actor (Dachimawa Lee, No Blood No Tears, Arahan).
- Wiktor Kinecki, 96, Polish politician, MP (1976–1980).
- Graham Knight, 94, Australian footballer (Fitzroy).
- Milorad Kosanović, 75, Serbian football player (Proleter Zrenjanin, Vojvodina) and manager (Malta national team).
- Bernard Lemoux, 83, French businessman, president of Stade Rennais FC (1973–1977).
- George C. Lodge, 98, American politician.
- Oscar Lofton, 87, American football player (Boston Patriots) and coach (Southeastern Louisiana Lions).
- Naser Toure Mahama, 60, Ghanaian politician, MP (since 2012).
- Miloslav Masopust, 101, Czech general.
- Giorgos Papadakis, 74, Greek journalist and television presenter, heart attack.
- Daniel Pelletti, 77, Belgian painter.
- Jules Radich, 71, New Zealand politician, mayor of Dunedin (2022–2025), heart attack.
- Michael Reagan, 80, American political commentator.
- Donald C. Rogers, 94, American sound engineer (Rocky, The Shawshank Redemption, Star Trek: The Motion Picture).
- Marissa Sanchez, 69, Filipino tennis player.
- Jacqueline Schaeffer, 91, French psychoanalyst.
- Anne Severs, 94, British-born New Zealand artist.
- Steve Sheetz, 77, American convenience store operator, CEO and president of Sheetz, Inc. (1984–1995).
- Jitamitra Prasad Singh Deo, 79, Indian historian and archaeologist.
- Ralph L. Thomas, 86, Brazilian-born Canadian film director (The Terry Fox Story, Apprentice to Murder, Ticket to Heaven) and screenwriter, complications from heart disease.
- Horacio Usandizaga, 85, Argentine politician, senator (1995–2003) and mayor of Rosario (1983–1989), complications from multiple strokes.
- Mary White, 81, Irish businesswoman and politician, senator (2002–2016).
- Xiao Zhuang, 93, Chinese photographer.
- Teresa Zalewska, 83, Polish politician, MP (1989–1991).

=== 5 ===
- Ahn Sung-ki, 74, South Korean actor (Silmido, Two Cops, Radio Star), blood cancer.
- Aldrich Ames, 84, American counterintelligence officer (CIA) and convicted Soviet-era spy.
- Bonifacio Ávila, 75, Colombian Olympic boxer (1972).
- Herbert Beck, 84, German art historian.
- Andrew Bodnar, 71, English bass guitarist (The Rumour) and songwriter ("I Love the Sound of Breaking Glass").
- Andrew Carter, 86, English composer (Benedicite) and conductor.
- Tom Cherones, 86, American television director (Seinfeld, NewsRadio, Ellen), complications from Alzheimer's disease.
- Beatriz de Lenclós, 102, Spanish dancer.
- Marian Diamond, 89, English actress (Subterfuge, Goodbye Gemini, The Lord of the Rings).
- Miklós Dudás, 34, Hungarian Olympic sprint canoeist (2012), world champion (2014).
- Aoi Fujino, 27, Japanese gravure idol, rhabdomyosarcoma.
- Paolo Gillet, 96, Italian Roman Catholic prelate, auxiliary bishop of Albano (1993–2005).
- Pier Francesco Guarguaglini, 88, Italian defense industry executive, chairman of Finmeccanica (2002–2011).
- Bruce Hammock, 78, American entomologist.
- Andrew Hichens, 89, English cricketer (Oxford University, Oxfordshire).
- Ad van Kempen, 81, Dutch actor (1-900, 'n Beetje Verliefd, Winter in Wartime), prostate cancer.
- José Mingorance, 87, Spanish football player (Espanyol, national team) and manager (Granada).
- Reza Moradi Abdolvand, 18, Iranian protester, shot.
- James E. O'Grady, 96, American law enforcement officer, Cook County sheriff (1986–1990).
- Jawann Oldham, 68, American basketball player (Chicago Bulls, Houston Rockets, New York Knicks).
- Induratana Paribatra, 103, Thai royal.
- Molly Parkin, 93, Welsh painter, novelist and journalist.
- Bob Pulford, 89, Canadian Hall of Fame ice hockey player (Toronto Maple Leafs, Los Angeles Kings), coach (Chicago Blackhawks), and executive, NHLPA president (1967–1972), four-time Stanley Cup champion.
- Leanne Rivlin, 96, American psychologist.
- Cosimo Scaglioso, 89, Italian politician, senator (1994–1996).
- Elle Simone, 49, American chef (America's Test Kitchen) and food stylist.
- Elsje de Wijn, 82, Dutch actress (De stille Oceaan, For a Lost Soldier, Het 14e kippetje) and singer.
- Ken Wilcock, 91, British sprinter. (death announced on this date)
- Mike Wilson, 66, British kart racer, six-time world champion.

=== 6 ===
- Joe Arlooktoo, 86, Canadian visual artist and politician, Northwest Territories MLA (1979–1991). (death announced on this date)
- Odette Bergoffen, 101, French resistance fighter.
- Andrzej Bogusławski, 94, Polish philologist and semanticist.
- Ron Boswell, 85, Australian politician, senator (1983–2014).
- John Cunningham, 93, American actor (Titanic, Company, Mystic Pizza).
- Dick Dull, 80, American athletic director (Maryland Terrapins).
- V. K. Ebrahimkunju, 73, Indian politician, Kerala MLA (2011–2021).
- Johannes Fabian, 88, German anthropologist.
- Alex Felipe, 32, Brazilian futsal player (Sporting CP, Norilsk Nickel, national team).
- Angella D. Ferguson, 100, American pediatrician.
- Edith M. Flanigen, 96, American chemist.
- Robert Goebbels, 81, Luxembourgish politician, minister for the economy (1989–1999) and energy (1994–1999), signatory of the Schengen Agreement.
- Richard Hynes, 81, British biologist.
- Suresh Kalmadi, 81, Indian politician and sports administrator, MP (1982–2014) and president of the IOA (1996–2011).
- Doug LaMalfa, 65, American politician, member of the U.S. House of Representatives (since 2013), heart attack.
- József Láyer, 70, Hungarian politician, MP (1998–2006).
- Rhoda Levine, 93, American opera director and choreographer.
- Jim McBride, 78, American country music songwriter ("Chasing That Neon Rainbow", "(Who Says) You Can't Have It All", "Chattahoochee").
- Jack McGregor, 91, American politician and sports team owner, member of the Pennsylvania State Senate (1963–1970) and founder of the Pittsburgh Penguins.
- Kathleen Muxel, 54, German politician, member of the Landtag of Brandenburg (since 2019).
- Raffaele Nogaro, 92, Italian Roman Catholic prelate, bishop of Sessa Aurunca (1982–1990) and of Caserta (1990–2009).
- John F. O'Donohue, 79, American actor (NYPD Blue, As Good as It Gets, The Family Man).
- Saeid Pirdoost, 85, Iranian actor (Snake Fang, Son of Adam, Daughter of Eve, Great Award), cancer.
- Claude Pivi, 66, Guinean military officer, complications from diabetes.
- Jaap Pop, 84, Dutch politician, mayor of Haarlem (1995–2006).
- David Quail, 88, South African politician and educator, member of the Gauteng Provincial Legislature (1999–2009).
- Nihal Seneviratne, 91, Sri Lankan civil servant, secretary general of the Parliament of Sri Lanka (1981–1994).
- Baghir Suleimanov, 66, Azerbaijani petroleum scientist.
- Béla Tarr, 70, Hungarian film director (Sátántangó, Werckmeister Harmonies, The Turin Horse).
- Stuart Tave, 102, American literary scholar.
- Justin Taylor, 82, New Zealand priest and historian.
- Jerry Thomas, 90, American baseball player (Minnesota Golden Gophers).
- Robert Vicot, 94, French football player (SC Toulon) and manager (Paris Saint-Germain FC, Gabon national team).
- Anatoly Yevtushenko, 91, Russian handball coach, Olympic champion (1976, 1988).

=== 7 ===
- Madjoulba Batocfetou, Togolese agronomic engineer.
- Ihor Blazhkov, 89, Ukrainian conductor.
- Albert Bourgi, 90, French jurist.
- Raffaella Bragazzi, 66, Italian television presenter and radio host.
- Frank S. Cerveny, 92, American Episcopalian clergyman, bishop of Florida (1974–1992).
- Martin Chivers, 80, English footballer (Southampton, Tottenham Hotspur, national team).
- Ángel Coerezza, 92, Argentine football referee (AFA).
- Keith Davis, 90, English cricketer (Cornwall).
- John W. Derr, 84, American politician, member of the Maryland Senate (1983–1999), cancer.
- Hiroya Ebina, 67, Japanese politician, mayor of Kushiro (2008–2024), member of the Hokkaido Legislative Assembly (1999–2008), cardiac arrest.
- Tony Field, 79, English footballer (Blackburn Rovers, Southport, Memphis Rogues).
- Vera Frances, 95, English actress (Back-Room Boy, King Arthur Was a Gentleman, It's That Man Again).
- Madhav Gadgil, 83, Indian ecologist.
- Renée Good, 37, American poet and writer, shot.
- Domenico Graziani, 81, Italian Roman Catholic prelate, bishop of Cassano all'Jonio (1999–2006) and archbishop of Crotone-Santa Severina (2006–2019).
- Glenn Hall, 94, Canadian Hall of Fame ice hockey player (Chicago Black Hawks, Detroit Red Wings, St. Louis Blues), Stanley Cup champion (1952, 1961).
- Sidney de Jong, 46, Dutch Olympic baseball player (2004, 2008).
- Rebecca Kilgore, 76, American jazz vocalist.
- Anthony King, 93, English cricketer (Yorkshire).
- Willie Knox, 88, Scottish football player (Forfar Athletic, Raith Rovers, Barrow) and manager. (death announced on this date)
- John Levra, 88, American college football player (Pittsburg State Gorillas) and coach (New Mexico Highlands Cowboys, Stephen F. Austin Lumberjacks).
- Jon Lindsay, 90, American politician, member of the Texas Senate (1997–2007).
- Uri Lupolianski, 74, Israeli politician, mayor of Jerusalem (2003–2008) and founder of Yad Sarah.
- Ian McCrae, 84, Scottish rugby union player (Gordonians, national team).
- Randy McMillan, 67, American football player (Baltimore/Indianapolis Colts).
- Roberto Mondragón, 85, American politician, lieutenant governor of New Mexico (1971–1975, 1979–1983).
- Nancy Skinner Nordhoff, 93, American philanthropist and environmentalist.
- Raj Kumar Pathria, 92, Indian-American physicist.
- Jervis Percy, 97, British Olympic modern pentathlete (1952).
- Kabindra Purkayastha, 94, Indian politician, MP (1991–2014).
- Howard Sanderford, 90, American politician, member of the Alabama House of Representatives (1989–2022).
- Arthur Stockwin, 90, British political scientist.
- Dietrich Stratmann, 88, German politician, member of the Landtag of Lower Saxony (1982–2003).
- Seydou Madani Sy, 92, Senegalese jurist and politician, minister of justice (1986–1990).
- Kim Thorson, 93, Canadian politician, Saskatchewan MLA (1956–1960, 1971–1975).
- Billy Truax, 82, American football player (Los Angeles Rams, Dallas Cowboys).
- Chiara Valentini, 84, Italian journalist and writer.
- Murad Wahba, 99, Egyptian writer, philosopher and academic.
- Athol Webb, 90, Australian footballer (Melbourne).

=== 8 ===
- Arthur Alphin, 77, American military historian.
- Dolores Ashcroft-Nowicki, 96, British occult writer.
- Musa Gibril Bala Gaye, 79, Gambian economist and politician, minister of finance (2003–2009) and foreign affairs (2005).
- Murat Bisenbin, 53, Kazakh actor, cancer.
- Richard Bornat, 81, British author and researcher.
- Loraine Braham, 87, Australian politician, member (1994–2008) and speaker (1997–1999, 2001–2005) of the Northern Territory Legislative Assembly.
- Günther Brendel, 95, German painter, graphic artist and academic.
- Václav Cigler, 96, Czech sculptor and visual artist.
- Mieczysław Czerniawski, 77, Polish politician, MP (1989–1991, 1993–2005).
- Nelly Chatué Diop, 41, Cameroonian computer scientist.
- Jean-Luc Domenach, 80, French historian, sinologist and political scientist.
- Ian Fraser, 93, Canadian army colonel and military event organiser.
- Jim Furlong, 85, Canadian football player (Calgary Stampeders).
- Sergio Goizauskas, 69, Argentine-born French cartoonist.
- Vijay Singh Gond, 68, Indian politician, Uttar Pradesh MLA (1980–2007, since 2024), kidney failure.
- Dave Hitchcock, 76, English record producer (In the Land of Grey and Pink, Foxtrot, The Snow Goose) and accountant.
- Philippe Junot, 85, French venture capitalist and property developer.
- Madalitso Kazombo, 46, Malawian politician, first deputy speaker of the National Assembly (2019–2025), asthma attack.
- Dieudonné Larose, 80, Haitian singer.
- Marie-Thérèse Lorcin, 93, French historian and academic.
- Evgeny Lyubivyi, 51, Russian politician.
- Antonino Mangano, 75, Italian marathon and middle-distance runner.
- Michael McElroy, 86, American scientist.
- Guy Moon, 63, American composer (The Fairly OddParents, Big Time Rush, Danny Phantom), traffic collision.
- Jafar Nainggolan, 79, Indonesian politician, MP (2009–2014).
- Hiroshi Nakamura, 93, Japanese surrealist painter, pancreatic cancer.
- Álvaro Peña-Rojas, 82, Chilean-German singer and songwriter.
- Helen Peters, 83, Canadian academic.
- Jürgen Plagemann, 89, German rower, Olympic silver medalist (1964).
- Siegfried Radandt, 90, German Olympic bobsledder (1976).
- Howard Riley, 87, English footballer (Leicester City, Walsall, Barrow).
- Astrid Roemer, 78, Surinamese-Dutch writer and teacher.
- Kjersti Scheen, 82, Norwegian journalist and writer.
- Uljana Semjonova, 73, Latvian basketball player, Olympic champion (1976, 1980).
- Sir Tim Shadbolt, 78, New Zealand politician, mayor of Waitemata City (1983–1989) and Invercargill (1993–1995, 1998–2022).
- Meinam Bhorot Singh, 75, Indian politician, Manipur MLA (2002–2007).
- Mojtaba Tarshiz, 47, Iranian footballer (Shahr Khodro F.C., Sanat Mes Kerman F.C., Gostaresh Foulad F.C.), shot.
- Matthew Taylor, 57, American musician (Bellini) and artist, heart attack.
- Wim Van Belleghem, 62, Belgian Olympic rower (1988, 1992), world champion (1987).
- Paul Calvin Visser, 89, American politician, mayor of Flint, Michigan (1973–1975).
- Sir Christopher White, 95, British art historian and curator.
- Terry Yorath, 75, Welsh football player (Leeds United, national team) and manager (national team).
- Tarsicio Herrera Zapién, 90, Mexican writer and academic.

=== 9 ===
- Ai, 49, Japanese Western chimpanzee, subject of cognition studies, multiple organ failure.
- Zeno Bianu, 75, French writer.
- Andrés Caniulef, 48, Chilean journalist, heart attack.
- T. K. Carter, 69, American actor (The Thing, Punky Brewster, Runaway Train).
- Patrick Skene Catling, 100, British journalist, author (The Chocolate Touch) and critic.
- Daniel Colson, 82, French sociologist and academic.
- Robert Croft, 91, American freediver.
- Jean-Louis Duplat, 88, Belgian magistrate.
- Frank J. Frost, 96, American scholar and politician.
- Beatriz González, 93, Colombian painter, sculptor and art historian.
- Ulf Granberg, 80, Swedish comics creator and editor (The Phantom).
- Monika Greening, 60, German midwife.
- Jitka Gruntová, 80, Czech politician, deputy (2002–2006).
- Hans Herrmann, 97, German racing driver (Formula One).
- Sandra Hester, 68, American socio-political activist, sepsis.
- Nessa Hyams, 84, American casting director (The Exorcist, Blazing Saddles) and television director (Mary Hartman, Mary Hartman).
- Pirkko Ikonen, 98, Finnish politician, MP (1983–1991).
- Manfred Kuhmichel, 82, German politician, member of the Landtag of North Rhine-Westphalia (1990–2012).
- Khawlhring Lalremruata, 38, Indian cricketer (Mizoram), heart attack.
- Lê Văn Dũng, 80, Vietnamese military officer and politician, chief of the general staff (1998–2001).
- Philip Long, 77, American Olympic swimmer (1968).
- Bill Millar, 79, English visual effects artist (The X-Files, Close Encounters of the Third Kind, Star Trek: The Motion Picture), Emmy winner (2000).
- Daniel Moerman, 84, American medical anthropologist and ethnobotanist.
- Diane Munday, 94, British political activist, co-founder of the British Pregnancy Advisory Service.
- Ted Nichols, 97, American composer, conductor and arranger (The Flintstones, Jonny Quest).
- Tina Packer, 87, British actress (David Copperfield, Doctor Who) and stage director, co-founder of Shakespeare & Company.
- Larry Snook, 84, American politician.
- Terry Sullivan, 87, British drummer (Renaissance).
- Gilbert Thompson, 93, British physician.
- Josep Maria Triginer, 82, Spanish politician, deputy (1977–1989).
- Eleni Varikas, 76, Greek-born French political philosopher and academic, lung cancer.
- Sidney A. Wallace, 98, American rear admiral.
- Georg Winter, 84, German businessman and environmentalist.
- Yao Chiang-lin, 75, Taiwanese politician, member of the National Assembly (2005).
- Vincenzo Zarri, 96, Italian Roman Catholic prelate, auxiliary bishop of Bologna (1976–1988) and bishop of Forlì-Bertinoro (1988–2005).
- Jaro Zawislan, 55, American college soccer coach (Cornell Big Red).

=== 10 ===
- Willie Allan, 83, Scottish footballer (Greenock Morton, Alloa Athletic, Durban City).
- Jeanne Auclair, 101, Canadian artist.
- Fredrick Brennan, 31, American software developer, founder of 8chan.
- Sturla Böðvarsson, 80, Icelandic politician, minister of communications and transportation (1999–2007), president of the Althing (2007–2009).
- Manoel Carlos, 92, Brazilian television writer (Por Amor, Laços de Família, Mulheres Apaixonadas).
- Dan Coleman, 63, American football player (Minnesota Vikings).
- Yolande Viviane Compaoré, Burkinabe politician, governor of Nord Region.
- Erich von Däniken, 90, Swiss author and ufologist (Chariots of the Gods?).
- Roseanne Diab, 76, South African atmospheric scientist.
- Distorted Humor, 32, American Thoroughbred racehorse and sire, euthanized.
- Oskár Elschek, 94, Slovak ethnomusicologist.
- Sergey Galkov, 60, Russian Olympic sprint canoeist (1988).
- Jim Hartung, 65, American gymnast, Olympic champion (1984), and coach.
- Włodzimierz Jakubowski, 86, Polish football player (Lech Poznań) and manager (Mieszko Gniezno, Bałtyk Gdynia).
- Kathy Javner, 52, American politician, member of the Maine House of Representatives (since 2018), breast cancer.
- Yeison Jiménez, 34, Colombian singer, plane crash.
- Deirdre Jordan, 99, Australian academic and educator.
- Václav Klučka, 72, Czech politician, deputy (1992–1996, 2006–2017).
- Robert W. Kostelka, 92, American judge and politician, member of the Louisiana State Senate (2003–2016).
- Lu Hsin-min, 85, Taiwanese politician, member of the Legislative Yuan (1993–2005).
- Derek Martin, 92, British actor (Law & Order, Eldorado, EastEnders).
- Marco Proaño Maya, 80, Ecuadorian politician, three-time deputy.
- Ritsuko Nagao, 92, Japanese politician, member of the House of Councillors (1997–1998) and minister of justice (1996).
- Karl Riha, 90, German poet, writer and literary scholar.
- Peig Ryan, 103, Irish musician.
- Grete Salomonsen, 74, Norwegian film director (Kamilla and the Thief, Yohan: The Child Wanderer).
- Kamlesh Shukla, 73, Indian politician, MLA (2017–2022).
- Davinder Singh, 73, Indian field hockey player, Olympic champion (1980).
- Ivan Štampach, 79, Czech religionist and theologian.
- Thierry Steimetz, 42, French footballer (Amnéville, Metz, Homburg), cancer.
- Orazio Svelto, 89, Italian physicist.
- Isabel Veloso, 19, Brazilian social media influencer, complications from bone marrow transplant.
- Manolo Villaverde, 91, Cuban-American actor (¿Qué Pasa, USA?, Taina, Wiseguy).
- Prawase Wasi, 93, Thai hematologist.
- Bob Weir, 78, American Hall of Fame musician (Grateful Dead) and songwriter ("Sugar Magnolia", "One More Saturday Night"), complications from cancer.
- Robert Wolgemuth, 77, American author, chairman of the Evangelical Christian Publishers Association.

=== 11 ===
- Pavel Akishev, 42, Russian baseball player (national team).
- Gabriel Barkay, 81, Israeli archaeologist.
- Alberto Benzoni, 90, Italian journalist and politician.
- Louis E. Brus, 82, American chemist, Nobel Prize laureate (2023), myelodysplastic syndrome.
- Thomas Causey, 76, American sound engineer (Dick Tracy, Star Trek Generations, Escape from New York).
- Richard Codey, 79, American politician, governor of New Jersey (2004–2006), member of the New Jersey Senate (1982–2024).
- Patrick Corrigan, 69, American psychologist and writer.
- René V. Dawis, 97, American psychologist.
- Karl Freed, 83, American theoretical chemist.
- William Gazecki, 69, American film director (Waco: The Rules of Engagement).
- Marcus Gilbert, 67, British actor (Army of Darkness, The Masks of Death, Rambo III), throat cancer.
- Dave Giusti, 86, American baseball player (Houston Astros, Pittsburgh Pirates), World Series champion (1971).
- Robert Hopkins, 64, English footballer (Birmingham City, West Bromwich Albion, Shrewsbury Town).
- Samak Jalikula, 86, Thai politician, member of the House of Representatives (1975–1976).
- Bennie Carlton Keel, 91, American archaeologist.
- Ueli Kestenholz, 50, Swiss snowboarder, Olympic bronze medallist (1998), injuries sustained in an avalanche.
- Mukharby Kirzhinov, 77, Russian weightlifter, Olympic champion (1972).
- Kōtarō Kodama, 91, Japanese politician, mayor of Akitakata (1980–2008).
- Philip Leider, 96, American educator and editor, founder of Artforum.
- Vincent Lozzi, 93, American politician, member of the Massachusetts House of Representatives (1985–1991).
- Nelson Manrique, 78, Peruvian historian and sociologist.
- Ahmad Melli, 76–77, Syrian actor.
- Miquel Naudí, 77, Andorran hotelier and politician, member of the General Council (1981–1983).
- Takashi Ono, 97, Japanese-born American mathematician.
- Park Soon-yong, 81, South Korean lawyer, prosecutor general (1999–2001).
- Miroslava Pešíková, 79, Czech dancer and ballet master.
- William E. Peterson, 89, American politician, member of the Illinois House of Representatives (1983–1993) and Senate (1993–2009).
- Clarence Pierce, 97, American politician, member of the Mississippi House of Representatives (1952–1984).
- Eugen Pojoni, 84, Romanian footballer (Viitorul București, Crișul Oradea, UTA Arad).
- Laumatiamanu Ringo Purcell, Samoan politician, MLA (2021–2025).
- Samir Putatundu, 73, Indian politician.
- Richard Schoon, 97, Singaporean Olympic field hockey player (1956).
- Robert G. Shulman, 101, American biophysicist.
- Aniceto Sobrepeña, 77, Filipino banker and public servant.
- Prashant Tamang, 43, Indian singer (Indian Idol) and actor (Paatal Lok), cardiac arrest.
- Sergio Tarquinio, 100, Italian painter.
- Trevor A. Toussaint, 65, British actor (Hollyoaks).
- John Wallace, 76, Scottish trumpeter, composer and arts educator.
- Herman Wouters, 85, Belgian politician, mayor of Grobbendonk (1989–1997).

=== 12 ===
- Oba C. D. Akran, 89, Nigerian politician and traditional ruler.
- Sheila Bernette, 94, English singer (The Good Old Days, The Black and White Minstrel Show) and actress (The Magnificent Seven Deadly Sins).
- Mark Brnovich, 59, American politician and attorney, Arizona attorney general (2015–2023), heart attack.
- Paul Clauson, 76, Australian politician, Queensland MP (1985–1989), attorney-general (1986–1989).
- Patricia Coombs, 99, American author and illustrator.
- Rolland Courbis, 72, French football player (Monaco) and manager (Bordeaux, Marseille).
- Bill Courtney, 55, American college basketball coach (Cornell Big Red, Miami Hurricanes, Temple Owls).
- Mochammad Djamhari, 82, Indonesian military officer and politician, regent of Bekasi (1993–1998).
- Henri Dorion, 90, Canadian academic and geographer.
- Charles H. Epps Jr., 95, American orthopaedic surgeon and academic administrator.
- John Forté, 50, American rapper (Refugee Camp All-Stars) and producer (The Score).
- Rick Garcia, 69, American LGBTQ activist.
- Mohammad Ilyas, 79, Pakistani cricketer (Lahore, Pakistan International Airlines, national team), cancer.
- Asda Jayanama, 84, Thai diplomat.
- Robert Jensen, 52, Dutch television personality (Jensen!), cardiac arrest.
- Jayashree Kabir, 73, Indian actress (Pratidwandi, Simana Periye, Rupali Saikate).
- Robert V. Kohn, 72, American mathematician, cancer.
- Matt Kwasniewski-Kelvin, 26, British guitarist (Black Midi), suicide.
- Robert H. Liebeck, 87, American aerodynamicist, academic and aerospace engineer.
- Lu Kejian, 93, Chinese politician, deputy (1988–1998).
- Jan Mårtenson, 92, Swedish author and diplomat, ambassador to Switzerland and Liechtenstein (1993–1995).
- Eddie McCreadie, 85, Scottish football player (Chelsea, national team) and manager (Chelsea).
- Luigi Nicolais, 83, Italian engineer and politician, minister for public administration (2006–2008), deputy (2008–2012), and president of the National Research Council (2012–2016).
- Alain Orsoni, 71, French politician, Corsican independence militant (FLNC) and football executive (AC Ajaccio), shot.
- John A. Pollock, 89, Canadian electronics executive, president of Electrohome (1972–2008).
- Kerreen Reiger, 79, Australian sociologist.
- Mario Rigutti, 99, Italian astronomer.
- Roland Riz, 98, Italian politician, deputy (1958–1963, 1968–1987), senator (1987–1996).
- Catherine Samie, 92, French actress (Lovers of Paris, The Old Maid, They Came Back).
- Pedro A. Sanchez, 85, American soil scientist.
- John Thorley, 85, British classicist.
- Michel Tombereau, 80, French painter, complications from influenza.
- José Eduardo Velásquez Tarazona, 78, Peruvian Roman Catholic prelate, auxiliary bishop (1994–2000) and bishop (2004–2024) of Huaraz.
- Arend Vermaat, 86, Dutch politician, MP (1971–1975), senator (1991–1995).
- Karen Vold, 86, American Hall of Fame trick rider.
- Martin Willich, 80, German politician, member of the Hamburg Parliament (1974–1995).
- Isaac Witz, 91, Austrian-born Israeli immunologist.
- Benjaminas Zelkevičius, 81, Lithuanian football player (Žalgiris Vilnius, Shakhtar Donetsk) and manager (national team).

=== 13 ===
- Scott Adams, 68, American cartoonist (Dilbert), prostate cancer.
- Juan Antonio de Andrés, 83, Spanish politician, president of the Government of Aragon (1982–1983).
- Iqbal Athas, 81, Sri Lankan journalist (The Sunday Times, Jane's Defence Weekly).
- Alfred Blumstein, 95, American scientist.
- David Collier, 70, English sports administrator, chief executive of the England and Wales Cricket Board (2004–2014).
- Claudette Colvin, 86, American civil rights activist (Browder v. Gayle).
- Indira Devi Dhanrajgir, 95, Indian poet and socialite.
- Peter Duesberg, 89, German-American molecular biologist and academic, kidney failure.
- Catherine Duprat, 89, French historian.
- Barbara Eustachiewicz, 87, Polish Olympic gymnast (1960, 1964).
- Jesse Flis, 92, Canadian politician, MP (1979–1984, 1988–1997).
- Alfred Grimm, 82, German object artist, sculptor and painter.
- Bir Bhadra Hagjer, 75, Indian politician, Assam MLA (2016–2021).
- Ali Hassan, 61, Mozambican footballer (Sporting, Vitória de Setúbal, national team), cancer.
- Brandon Holiday, 53, American canoeist.
- Hun Yuan, 81, Taiwanese religious leader, founder of Weixinism.
- Heiki Kranich, 64, Estonian politician, twice MP, minister of finance (1994) and environment (1999–2003).
- Richard W. Kunkel, 91, American politician.
- Jason Lafreniere, 59, Canadian ice hockey player (Quebec Nordiques, Tampa Bay Lightning, New York Rangers).
- Blanche Marvin, 100, American-born British theatre critic, producer and writer.
- Doug McConnell, 80, American television journalist.
- Bruce McLeod, 96, Canadian clergyman, moderator of the United Church of Canada (1972–1974).
- Rolando Nannicini, 79, Italian politician, deputy (2001–2013).
- Seán Ó Sé, 89, Irish tenor singer.
- Ivan Onufriyev, 58, Russian footballer (Geolog Tyumen, MTsOP-Metallurg Verkhnyaya Pyshma, Dynamo Stavropol).
- Sara Jane Paez, 57, Filipino beauty queen.
- Laslo Pavlik, 79–80, Serbian road racing cyclist.
- Annemarie Prins, 93, Dutch actress (Accused, Memory Lane), director and writer.
- José Rodrigo, 91, Portuguese politician, MP (1985–1987).
- Peter Schofield, 93, Australian footballer (Richmond, Moorabbin, North Melbourne).
- Stu Tate, 63, American baseball player (San Francisco Giants), heart attack.
- Jean-Loup Trassard, 92, French photographer.
- Rudolf Urc, 88, Slovak film director and academic.
- George Vassiliou, 94, Cypriot politician, president (1988–1993) and MP (1996–2001), respiratory infection.
- David Webb, 60, British-born Hong Kong activist investor, prostate cancer.
- Jerry Wilburn, 85, American politician, member of the Mississippi House of Representatives (1964–1980).
- Brian Wilshire, 81, Australian radio broadcaster (2GB).
- Razmik Zohrabyan, 75, Armenian politician, MP (2007–2017).

=== 14 ===
- Layonel Adams, 31, Russian footballer (Banants, Cerceda, Isloch Minsk Raion), fall.
- Dmitri Akimov, 45, Russian footballer (Metallurg Lipetsk, Sibir Novosibirsk, Rostov).
- Aroha Awarau, 49, New Zealand playwright and journalist.
- Namirembe Bitamazire, 84, Ugandan academic and politician, MP (2001–2011).
- Alfonso Castellanos, 91, Colombian radio broadcaster and journalist.
- Jean Chollet, 89, French scenographer and journalist (Encyclopædia Universalis).
- Jean-Hugues Colonna, 91, French politician, deputy (1981–1988).
- Donald Douglas, 92, Scottish actor (Bridget Jones's Diary, Take the High Road, A Bridge Too Far).
- Valeria Fedeli, 76, Italian politician, minister of education (2016–2018) and senator (2013–2022).
- Osvaldas Jablonskis, 81, Lithuanian painter.
- Oleksandr Kabanov, 52, Ukrainian politician, deputy (since 2019).
- Kim Min-jae, 53, South Korean baseball player (Lotte Giants, Hanwha Eagles) and coach (Doosan Bears), cancer.
- Richard Larn, 94, British businessman and maritime history writer.
- Bruce Leung, 77, Hong Kong martial artist and actor (The Return of the Condor Heroes, Broken Oath, The Legendary Fok), heart failure.
- Rick Link, 66, American professional wrestler, trainer and promoter.
- Mieczysław Mąkosza, 91, Polish organic chemist, co-discoverer of the vicarious nucleophilic substitution.
- Brian McGowan, 88, Australian footballer (South Melbourne, Glenelg).
- Nie Weiping, 73, Chinese Go player.
- Ricard Pérez Casado, 80, Spanish politician, mayor of Valencia (1979–1988) and deputy (2000–2004).
- Seppo Reijonen, 81, Finnish Olympic ski jumper (1968).
- Jean Rossier, 81, Belgian biologist and academic.
- Ernestine Russell, 87, Canadian Olympic gymnast (1956, 1960).
- Ado Schlier, 90, German radio personality (Radio Salzburg, Bayerischer Rundfunk).
- Willie Scott, 80, American basketball player (Dallas Chaparrals).
- Vera Valdez, 89, Brazilian model.
- Quemil Yambay, 87, Paraguayan musician and composer.
- Klaus Zillich, 83, German architect, urban planner and academic.
- Igor Zolotovitskiy, 64, Russian actor (Taxi Blues, Luna Park, Composition for Victory Day), academic and television director, cancer.

=== 15 ===
- Abdullahi Abubakar, 90, Nigerian Islamic cleric and humanitarian.
- Anouschka Bernhard, 55, German footballer (VfL Sindelfingen, FSV Frankfurt, national team).
- J. Lawrence Cogan, 81, American medical examiner, Los Angeles County chief medical examiner-coroner (1990–1992).
- Ray Crone, 94, American baseball player (Milwaukee Braves, New York/San Francisco Giants), and scout (Montreal Expos).
- Dogardisc, Colombian champeta singer and songwriter, diabetes.
- Nabaloum Dramane, 58, Ivorian-born Burkinabe boxer, ABU featherweight champion (1994–1995).
- Guillermo Fonseca Álvarez, 92, Mexican politician, mayor of San Luis Potosí (1968–1970), governor of San Luis Potosí (1973–1979) and two-time deputy.
- Ante Grgurević, 50, Croatian basketball player (Split, Lugano Tigers) and coach (Split).
- Angelo Gugel, 90, Italian papal assistant.
- Rafael Gvaladze, 78, Azerbaijani jurist, judge of the Constitutional Court (1998–2025).
- Kevin Healy, 88, Australian footballer (Collingwood).
- Bill Hembree, 59, American politician, member of the Georgia House of Representatives (1993–1997, 1999–2013).
- Clay Iles, 83, English tennis player and coach.
- Princess Irene of Greece and Denmark, 83, Greek-Spanish royal.
- André Jammes, 98, French bookseller and photography historian.
- Wim Kelleners, 75, Dutch racing cyclist.
- Kim Sin-yong, 80, South Korean writer.
- Paul Larivaille, 93, French literary critic and academic, president of Paris Nanterre University (1988–1993).
- Marceau Mairesse, 80, Belgian politician, senator (1991–1995) and MP (1995–2003).
- Mutumwa Mawere, 66, Zimbabwean-South African mining industry executive.
- Mohammed Mohsin, Bangladeshi diplomat, permanent representative to the United Nations (1991).
- Kenny Morris, 68, English drummer (Siouxsie and the Banshees).
- Harry Olmer, 98, Polish-born British Holocaust survivor and educator.
- Hermann Peter Piwitt, 90, German writer.
- Arne Roosman, 93, Estonian-born Canadian painter.
- Edgar Salvé, 79, Belgian Olympic middle-distance runner (1968, 1972).
- George Speake, 81, English art historian and archaeologist.
- Filip Stojanović, 81, Serbian politician.
- Ajay Varma, 62, Indian cricketer (Bengal).
- Pertti Voutilainen, 85, Finnish banker and businessman.
- Jim Wearne, 75, American musician.
- Wei Fulin, 87, Chinese army general, commander of the Chengdu Military Region (1994–1995).
- James F. White, 90, American politician, member of the Minnesota House of Representatives (1975–1978).
- Alan Woods, 83, English Anglican priest, dean of Gibraltar (2003–2008).
- Gagik Yeganyan, 69, Armenian politician.

=== 16 ===
- Grant Batty, 74, New Zealand rugby union player (Wellington, Bay of Plenty, national team).
- François Bazaramba, 75, Rwandan convicted war criminal (Rwandan genocide).
- Bruce Bilson, 97, American television director (Get Smart, Hogan's Heroes, Dinosaurs), Emmy winner (1968).
- Morris Bodnar, 77, Canadian politician, MP (1993–1997).
- Peer Bork, 62, German bioinformatician.
- Mickey Brady, 75, Northern Irish politician, MLA (2007–2015) and MP (2015–2024).
- Chet Brooks, 60, American football player (San Francisco 49ers), Super Bowl champion (1989, 1990), cancer.
- Serafín Cartagena Ocaña, 101, Ecuadorian Roman Catholic prelate, vicar apostolic of Zamora in Ecuador (1982–2003).
- Rocco B. Commisso, 76, Italian-born American businessman and football team owner (Fiorentina).
- Ioan Crâsnic, 96, Romanian wrestler and wrestling coach.
- Tony Dallara, 89, Italian singer ("Come Prima", "Romantica"), respiratory illness.
- Cristino de Vera, 94, Spanish painter.
- Osvaldo Díaz, 76, Chilean singer.
- Luísa Diogo, 67, Mozambican economist and politician, prime minister (2004–2010) and minister of planning and finance (2000–2005).
- Pierre Ducimetière, 83, French epidemiologist.
- Bob Duffy, 85, American basketball player (St. Louis Hawks, Detroit Pistons, New York Knicks).
- Jógvan Durhuus, 87, Faroese politician, member of the Løgting (1970–1980, 1984–1990, 1994–2002).
- Mieczysław Furmanek, 89, Polish politician, MP (1972–1980).
- José Antonio Gallego, 83, Spanish politician, deputy (1983–1984, 2000–2004), senator (1993–2000).
- Evelyn Gigantes, 83, Canadian politician, Ontario MPP (1975–1995).
- Gregory Gregoriadis, 91, Greek-born British biochemist.
- Ha Sun-bong, 84, South Korean politician, MP (1981–1985, 1992–2004).
- Joachim Hagenauer, 84, German information theorist.
- Leanne Harrison, 67, Australian tennis player.
- Murad Hasratyan, 90, Armenian architectural historian.
- Olena Hrechanina, 90, Ukrainian geneticist.
- Joel T. Johnson, 89, American politician, member of the Nebraska Legislature (2002–2009).
- Mark Jones, 72, American screenwriter and film director (Leprechaun, Rumpelstiltskin, Triloquist).
- Bheemanna Khandre, 100, Indian politician, Karnataka MLA (1962–1972, 1978–1985), respiratory failure.
- Tom Kim, 81, North Korean-born American physician.
- János Koltai, 90, Hungarian actor (The Round-Up, Ten Thousand Days, Szomszédok).
- Chris Krug, 86, American baseball player (Chicago Cubs, San Diego Padres).
- Robert Macklin, 84, Australian journalist and author, assisted suicide.
- Valère Novarina, 83, Swiss choreographer and photographer.
- Ratbek hadji Nysanbayev, 85, Kazakh Islamic jurist, supreme mufti of Kazakhstan (1990–2000). (death announced on this date)
- Erzsebet Palatinus, 66, Serbian table tennis player.
- Alexandros Papadogonas, 94, Greek politician, MP (1974–2000).
- Frank Pitts, 82, American football player (Kansas City Chiefs, Cleveland Browns, Oakland Raiders).
- Guillermo Rendón García, 90, Colombian composer and organist.
- Carl Sommer, 95, American author, educator and businessman.
- Julio Terán Dutari, 92, Panamanian-born Ecuadorian academic and Roman Catholic prelate, bishop of Ibarra (2004–2011).
- Arthur Tobin, 95, American politician, member of the Massachusetts House of Representatives (1967–1971) and Senate (1971–1978).
- Carlos Ward, 85, Panamanian-born American alto saxophonist and flautist (B. T. Express).
- Netsanet Workneh, 42, Ethiopian actor, filmmaker and television host.
- Yury Yemelyanov, 88, Russian historian and author.
- Yoichiro Yoshikawa, 68, Japanese composer, bile duct cancer.

=== 17 ===
- Roger Allers, 76, American film director (The Lion King, Open Season), animator and story artist (Aladdin).
- Craig Anderson, 83, American Episcopalian clergyman and theologian, bishop of South Dakota (1984–1992).
- David Annoussamy, 98, Indian jurist, judge of the Madras High Court (1984–1989).
- Stella Isodo Apolot, 51, Ugandan politician, MP (since 2021).
- Zara Aramyan, 55, Armenian actress and journalist.
- Ann Ashmead, 96, American archaeologist.
- Dino Attanasio, 100, Italian-born Belgian cartoonist (Bob Morane, Modeste et Pompon).
- Ali Salem al-Beidh, 86, Yemeni politician, vice president (1990–1994).
- Thierry Cazeneuve, 74, French journalist and writer, director of Critérium du Dauphiné (1988–2009).
- Travis Curtis, 60, American football player (Washington Redskins, New York Jets, Phoenix Cardinals), Super Bowl champion (XXVI).
- Monique Freres, 68, Belgian Olympic gymnast (1976).
- Johannes Fried, 83, German historian.
- Hoot Gibson, 86, American football player (San Diego Chargers, Oakland Raiders) and coach.
- Phil Goyette, 92, Canadian ice hockey player (New York Rangers, Montreal Canadiens) and coach (New York Islanders), four-time Stanley Cup champion.
- Leopold Herz, 72, German politician, member of the Landtag of Bavaria (2008–2023).
- Marie-Rose Kasa-Vubu Kiatazabu, 80, Congolese politician, deputy (1977–1982).
- Nicholas Krall, 93, American physicist.
- Sani Lakatani, 89, Niuean politician, prime minister (1999–2002) and deputy (1990–2004).
- Jaan Leetsar, 79, Estonian politician, MP (1992–1995) and minister of agriculture (1992–1994).
- Sir Fabian Malbon, 79, British Royal Navy officer, lieutenant governor of Guernsey (2005–2011).
- W. John McDonald, 89, Canadian physicist and academic administrator.
- Barbara McNamara, 83, American linguist.
- Marikena Monti, 82, Argentine actress and singer.
- Martin Murphy, 87, British rugby league footballer (Oldham, Rochdale Hornets, national team).
- Ivan Nestorov, 92, Bulgarian actor.
- Phyllis Papps, 81, Australian librarian and activist.
- James Petras, 89, American sociologist and academic.
- S. V. Adinarayana Rao, 86, Indian orthopaedic surgeon.
- Guillermo Salatino, 80, Argentine sports journalist (Radio Continental).
- Alan Sanches, 58, Brazilian politician, Bahia MLA (since 2011).
- Artur Shamrin, 56, Russian footballer (Lokomotiv Moscow). (body discovered on this date)
- Lazar Shvets, 86, Ukrainian-Russian Orthodox prelate, metropolitan of Simferopol and Crimea (1992–2023).
- Gladys West, 95, American mathematician.
- Wilbur Wood, 84, American baseball player (Boston Red Sox, Pittsburgh Pirates, Chicago White Sox).
- Tucker Zimmerman, 84, American singer-songwriter, smoke inhalation.

=== 18 ===
- John 'Oke Afareha, 78, Nigerian Roman Catholic prelate, auxiliary bishop (1997–2010) and bishop ordinary (2010–2022) of Warri.
- Arthur Bankhurst, 88, American rheumatologist.
- Georges Borchardt, 97, American literary agent.
- H. K. Edgerton, 77, American neo-Confederate activist.
- Joe Gadston, 80, English football player (Exeter City, Wimbledon) and manager (Hanwell Town), complications from Parkinson's disease.
- Gao Dezhan, 93, Chinese politician, governor of Jilin (1985–1987) and director of the National Forestry and Grassland Administration (1987–1993).
- Diana Green, 71, American cartoonist.
- Nandana Gunathilake, 63, Sri Lankan politician, MP (2000–2010).
- Stephen H. Hess, 92, American political scientist, prostate cancer.
- Raul Jungmann, 73, Brazilian politician, twice deputy, minister of defence (2016–2018) and public security (2018–2019), pancreatic cancer.
- Frank Kolb, 80, German historian and academic.
- Kuncoro, 52, Indonesian football player (Arema, national team) and manager, heart attack.
- Liang Dongcai, 93, Chinese molecular biophysicist, politician, and member of the Chinese Academy of Sciences.
- Liu Thai Ker, 87, Singaporean architect and urban planner, complications from a fall.
- Clare Cooper Marcus, 91, American educator.
- Zach Monroe, 94, American baseball player (New York Yankees), World Series champion (1958).
- Jean-Jacques Naudet, 81, French photographer, heart attack.
- Hristina Obradović, 94, Serbian hegumenia, abbess of Ljubostinja (since 1995).
- Raj K. Purohit, 70, Indian politician, Maharashtra MLA (1990–2009, 2014–2019).
- Ford C. Quillen, 87, American politician, member of the Virginia House of Delegates (1970–1994).
- Jaan Ross, 68, Estonian musicologist and psychologist.
- Alexander Ryazanov, 93, Russian air defense designer.
- Sławomir Sadowski, 77, Polish politician, senator (2005–2011).
- David Thomas, 83, British crown jeweller, complications from Alzheimer's disease.
- Ralph Towner, 85, American jazz multi-instrumentalist.
- Arnaldo Vianna, 78, Brazilian politician, mayor of Campos dos Goytacazes (1998–2005), deputy (2007–2011).
- David Young, 80, English footballer (Charlton Athletic, Southend United, Newcastle United).

=== 19 ===
- Mladen Bartolović, 48, Bosnian football player (Cibalia, NK Zagreb, national team) and manager.
- Roger-Maurice Bonnet, 88, French astrophysicist and academic.
- Kai Budde, 46, German Hall of Fame card game player (Magic: The Gathering), cancer.
- John Cenci, 92, American football player (Pittsburgh Steelers).
- Ralph Assheton, 2nd Baron Clitheroe, 96, British businessman and politician, member of the House of Lords (1984–1999).
- Roy Erskine, 94, Scottish footballer (Stirling Albion, Cowdenbeath).
- Norman Gifford, 85, English cricketer (Worcestershire, Warwickshire, national team), lung disease and pulmonary fibrosis.
- Paul Gorman, 98, American Army general.
- Stefan Gossler, 70, German actor and voice actor.
- Patsy King, 95, Australian actress (Prisoner, Homicide, Bellbird).
- Mikalay Korbut, 77, Belarusian politician, minister of finance (1997–2008).
- Eitan Na'eh, 62, Israeli diplomat, ambassador to Turkey (2016–2018) and Bahrain (2021–2023).
- Billy Parker, 88, American country music singer and DJ.
- Lucyna Pietrzyk, 69, Polish politician, MP (1993–1997).
- Jean Rabe, 68, American journalist and roleplaying game writer (Dragonlance, Dungeons & Dragons, Star Wars: The Roleplaying Game).
- Peter Radunski, 86, German politician and political consultant, member of the Abgeordnetenhaus of Berlin (1999–2001).
- Muhammad Bashir Saliu, 75, Nigerian Islamic scholar.
- Dave Schmidt, 69, American baseball player (Boston Red Sox).
- Charles C. Stevenson Jr., 95, American actor (Will & Grace, Snow Buddies, Ghost World).
- Valentino, 93, Italian fashion designer, founder of Valentino.
- Kim Vo, 55, American hairstylist, colorectal cancer.
- Richard Wixon, 68, New Zealand cricketer (Manawatu, Central Districts, Otago).
- Muhammad Yousuf, 74, Pakistani politician, MNA (2002–2007, 2013–2018).
- Luciano Zardi, 95, Italian Olympic weightlifter (1952).

=== 20 ===
- Rifaat al-Assad, 88, Syrian politician, vice president (1984–1998), complications from influenza.
- Dame Marie Bashir, 95, Australian psychiatrist and viceroy, governor of New South Wales (2001–2014).
- Håkan Bengtsson, 83, Swedish Olympic swimmer (1960).
- John H. Beyer, 92, American architect.
- Barbara Aronstein Black, 92, American legal scholar.
- Eugen Botez, 77, Romanian sprint canoer.
- Phil Boudreault, 50, Canadian Olympic boxer (1996) and outlaw biker.
- Tommie Brown, 91, American politician, member of the Tennessee House of Representatives (1992–2012), plaintiff in Brown v. Board of Commissioners of the City of Chattanooga.
- Deborah Cameron, 67, British linguist and feminist, pancreatic cancer.
- Thadeu Gomes Canellas, 95, Brazilian Roman Catholic prelate, auxiliary bishop of Porto Alegre (1983–1999) and bishop of Osório (1999–2006).
- Piotr Chojnacki, 80, Polish politician, senator (1991–1993), MP (1993–1997).
- Peter Cousens, 93, South African-born English cricketer (Essex).
- Louva Dahozy, 99, American Navajo rights activist.
- Daiwa Major, 24, Japanese Thoroughbred racehorse.
- Vicki L. Hanson, American computer scientist.
- Rob Hirst, 70, Australian Hall of Fame musician (Midnight Oil, Ghostwriters) and songwriter ("Forgotten Years"), pancreatic cancer.
- Robert E. Hunter, 85, American foreign policy advisor, ambassador to NATO (1993–1998).
- Ronald Joseph, 81, American figure skater, Olympic bronze medallist (1964), complications from amyotrophic lateral sclerosis.
- Susan Leeman, 95, American endocrinologist.
- Li Chang-su, 58, North Korean judoka, heart attack.
- Lucien Muller, 91, French football player (RC Strasbourg, Stade de Reims, national team) and manager.
- Alan Musgrave, 85, British-born New Zealand philosopher, Fellow of the Royal Society of New Zealand (since 2009).
- Michael Opitz, 63, German footballer (FC Schalke 04, Sportfreunde Siegen).
- Kathy Ormsby, 61, American long-distance runner
- Park Wan-gyu, 83, South Korean politician, MP (1981–1985).
- Maria Pilar Riba Font, 81, Andorran politician, member of the General Council (2005–2011).
- Klaus Rinke, 86, German artist.
- Albert Rothenberg, 95, American psychiatrist.
- Gordon L. Rottman, 78, American author and military historian.
- Yaw Sarpong, 66, Ghanaian gospel musician and songwriter.
- Bernice Shedrick, 85, American politician, member of the Oklahoma Senate (1980–1996).
- Kōzō Shioya, 71, Japanese voice actor (Dragon Ball Z, One Piece, Barefoot Gen), cerebral hemorrhage.
- Arvo Siikamäki, 82, Finnish sculptor.
- Bob Valentine, 85, Australian motorcycle speedway rider.
- Tommy Wright, 81, English footballer (Everton, national team).
- Toshikatsu Yamamoto, 96, Japanese physician.

=== 21 ===
- István Antal, 77, Romanian politician, deputy (1992–2016).
- Mark Batzer, 64, American geneticist and academic.
- Stephen Baxter, 56, British medieval historian. (death announced on this date)
- Allan Chapman, 79, British science historian.
- Yuriy Chonka, 34, Ukrainian footballer (Naftan Novopolotsk, Balmazújvárosi FC, FC Uzhhorod).
- José Cuéllar, 85, American anthropologist and musician, lung cancer.
- Princess Désirée, Baroness Silfverschiöld, 87, Swedish royal.
- Haldun Dormen, 97, Turkish actor.
- Richard Dugdale, 97, American oceanographer.
- Bobby Duncum, 81, American professional wrestler (WWWF, NWA, AWA) and football player.
- Rüdiger Erben, 58, German politician, member of the Landtag of Saxony-Anhalt (2006, since 2011).
- Freddy Ehrström, 100, Finnish Olympic sailor (1960).
- Colette Flesch, 88, Luxembourgish Olympic fencer (1960, 1964, 1968) and politician, mayor of Luxembourg City (1969–1980), deputy prime minister (1980–1984) and three-time MEP.
- Stanley Gerzofsky, 81, American politician, member of the Maine Senate (2009–2017).
- Sondra Gotlieb, 89, Canadian journalist and novelist.
- Raúl Guglielminetti, 84, Argentine intelligence officer and convicted criminal (Batallón de Inteligencia 601).
- Yōichi Higashi, 91, Japanese film director (The River with No Bridge).
- Eric L. Huntley, 96, Guyanese-born British activist, publisher and educator, stroke.
- Ilias Javed, 82, Bangladeshi actor and choreographer.
- Kevin Johnson, 55, American football player (Philadelphia Eagles, Oakland Raiders), blunt head trauma and stab wounds.
- M. Hafizuddin Khan, 89, Bangladeshi bureaucrat.
- Linda Kohen, 101, Italian-born Uruguayan painter.
- Petr Krill, 84, Czech politician, deputy (2002–2010).
- Ian Macowat, 60, English footballer (Crewe Alexandra, Northwich Victoria, Gillingham). (death announced on this date)
- Rob Maurer, 59, American baseball player (Texas Rangers).
- Raja Nadir Pervez, 83, Pakistani politician, MNA (1985–2007), minister of communications (1998–1999).
- Virginia Oliver, 105, American lobster fisher, pneumonia.
- Reza Rooygari, 79, Iranian actor (Eagles, The Tenants, The Old Bachelor), heart attack.
- Jan Nico Scholten, 93, Dutch politician, member of the Senate (1998–1999) and four-time MP.
- Aleksandr Shavlokhov, 86, South Ossetian politician, prime minister (1996–1998).
- Peter Squires, 74, English cricket (Yorkshire) and rugby union player (British & Irish Lions).
- Anthony P. Vainieri, 97, American politician, member of the New Jersey General Assembly (1984–1986).

=== 22 ===
- Laura Adler, 65, American casting director (American Dreams, Dream On, My Boys).
- John L. Allen Jr., 61, American journalist (Crux), stomach cancer.
- Raoul Aragon, 78, Filipino actor (Ina Ka ng Anak Mo).
- Abdul Salam Azimi, 90, Afghan judge, chief justice (2006–2014). (death announced on this date)
- Linden Bateman, 85, American politician, member of the Idaho House of Representatives (1976–1986, 2010–2016).
- Nicolas Blondeau, 70, French riding instructor and author.
- Mehmed Emîn Bozarslan, 91, Turkish-Swedish writer.
- Francis Buchholz, 71, German bass guitarist (Scorpions), cancer.
- Bunjop Bunnag, 100, Thai politician, minister of defence (1992).
- André Burguière, 87, French historian and academic.
- Ed Doyle, 90, Canadian politician, Ontario MPP (1995–1999).
- Eldaafer, 20, American Thoroughbred racehorse.
- Pedro Pablo Elizondo, 76, Mexican Roman Catholic prelate, bishop of Cancún-Chetumal (2004–2025), heart attack.
- Ernesto Gil Elorduy, 82, Mexican politician, senator (2000–2006).
- Wanda Fukała-Kaczmarczyk, 90, Polish Olympic fencer (1960, 1968).
- Marian Goodman, 97, American art dealer.
- J. S. Guleria, 98, Indian physician and cardiologist.
- Albert Holt, 89, Australian Bidjara elder.
- Guy Hovis, 84, American singer (The Lawrence Welk Show).
- Andrzej Januszajtis, 97, Polish physicist and politician, chairman of the city council of Gdańsk (1990–1994).
- Hifumi Katō, 86, Japanese shogi player.
- Alicja Kędzia, 84, Polish neurologist and anatomist.
- Květoslava Kořínková, 85, Czech politician, deputy (1996–1998).
- Ðani Kovač, 86, Serbian Olympic sprinter (1960, 1964).
- Marcel Loncle, 90, French footballer (Angers SCO, Rennes, national team).
- Francesco Mariotti, 82, Swiss artist and cultural activist.
- Walter Martínez, 84, Venezuelan journalist (VTV).
- Laurentine Mbede, Cameroonian politician, member of the National Assembly (since 2012).
- Alain Monney, 74, Swiss comedian and actor, brain tumour.
- Ilyas Pasha, 61, Indian footballer (East Bengal).
- Antonio Rodríguez Rodríguez, 81, Spanish politician, deputy (1979–1996), senator (1996–2000).
- William Safran, 95, American academic and Holocaust survivor.
- Joël Schmidt, 88, French novelist, historian and editor.
- E. A. Siddiq, 88, Indian agricultural scientist.
- Hudson Talbott, 76, American children's author and illustrator (We're Back! A Dinosaur Story).
- Kalin Terziyski, 55, Bulgarian writer.
- Dino Turcato, 79, Italian Olympic weightlifter (1972).
- Sammy Turner, 93, American singer.
- Floyd Vivino, 74, American actor (Good Morning, Vietnam, Crazy People, Mr. Wonderful), comedian, and television host.
- Hilton Woods, 57, American-Dutch Olympic swimmer (1984, 1988).

=== 23 ===
- Kikuo Arakawa, 96, Japanese medical scientist and internist.
- Robert A. Baines, 79, American politician, mayor of Manchester, New Hampshire (2000–2006), complications from a medical procedure.
- Chris Baur, 83, Scottish journalist (The Scotsman).
- Ed Bernard, 86, American actor (Police Woman, The White Shadow, Hardcastle and McCormick).
- Augusto Blacker Miller, 80, Peruvian politician, minister of foreign affairs (1991–1992).
- John Brodie, 90, American football player (San Francisco 49ers).
- Dalibor Brun, 81, Croatian singer.
- Carlo Cecchi, 86, Italian actor (His Day of Glory, Martin Eden, The Red Violin).
- Giancarlo Cella, 85, Italian football player (Torino, Catania, Internazionale) and manager.
- Brian Crowley, 61, Irish politician, senator (1993–1994) and MEP (1994–2019).
- Jean Dorion, 83, Canadian politician, MP (2008–2011), complications from Parkinson's disease and prostate cancer.
- Otto Duecker, 77, American painter.
- Paul Glynn, 97, Australian Marist missionary priest.
- Phil Griego, 77, American politician, member of the New Mexico Senate (1997–2015).
- Roland Huntford, 98, British polar historian and biographer.
- Alena Kučerová, 90, Czech printmaker.
- Fenwick Lawson, 93, English sculptor.
- Helen Leach, 80, New Zealand food anthropologist, Fellow of the Royal Society of New Zealand (since 2004).
- Liao Xilong, 85, Chinese general, head of GLD (2002–2012) and commander of the Chengdu Military Region (1995–2002).
- Yvonne Lime, 90, American actress (I Was a Teenage Werewolf, The Rainmaker, Father Knows Best).
- Donald John Roberts, 80, Canadian-American economist.
- Brian Rotman, 87, British academic.
- Selim Sadak, 71, Turkish politician, MP (1991–1994) and mayor of Siirt (2009–2014), cancer.
- Homare Suguro, 85, Japanese actor (None but the Brave) and singer.
- Igor Tyutin, 85, Russian theoretical physicist (Lebedev Institute).
- Bernhard Waldenfels, 91, German philosopher (Ruhr University Bochum).
- Anda Zaice, 84, Latvian actress (Trial on the Road).
- Ota Zaremba, 68, Czech weightlifter, Olympic champion (1980).

=== 24 ===
- David Abulafia, 76, British historian (The Great Sea: A Human History of the Mediterranean).
- Lennart Backman, 91, Swedish footballer (Norrköping, AIK, national team).
- Michel Barbey, 98, French actor (Rendezvous in July, Three Sailors in a Convent, Dominique).
- Sefer Baygın, 83, Turkish Olympic wrestler (1972). (death announced on this date)
- Boris Belousov, 91, Russian politician, Soviet minister of defense industry (1989–1991).
- Sal Buscema, 89, American comic book artist (Hulk, Spider-Man, Rom the Space Knight).
- Noel W. Campbell, 84, American politician, member of the Arizona House of Representatives (2015–2021), traffic collision.
- Nazzareno Canuti, 70, Italian footballer (Inter, Genoa, Catania).
- Paul William Coteus, 72, American electrical engineer, pancreatic cancer.
- Steve Dennis, 74, Canadian football player (Toronto Argonauts, Saskatchewan Roughriders).
- Howard Flight, Baron Flight, 77, British politician, MP (1997–2005) and member of the House of Lords (since 2011).
- Lee Fobbs, 75, American football player (Ottawa Rough Riders) and coach (North Carolina A&T Aggies, Grambling State Tigers).
- William Foege, 89, American physician and epidemiologist, director of the CDC (1977–1983), heart failure.
- Eduardo Gutiérrez Sáenz de Buruaga, 67, Spanish diplomat, ambassador to the Holy See (2012–2017) and Portugal (2017–2018).
- Bob Jones, 80, Canadian ice hockey player (New York Rangers).
- William M. Keys, 88, American Marine general.
- Faruk Kulenović, 74, Bosnian-Croatian basketball player (HAKK Mladost) and coach (Šibenka).
- Suthee Meanchainun, 96, Thai billionaire businessman.
- Aleksandr Oleinikov, 60, Russian film director, screenwriter and producer.
- Constantino de Oliveira Júnior, 57, Brazilian airline executive, founder and CEO (2004–2012) of Gol Linhas Aéreas, cancer.
- Michael Parenti, 92, American political scientist and academic historian.
- Alex Pretti, 37, American nurse, shot.
- Peter Ryan, 95, English rugby union player (Richmond Rugby, national team).
- Iain Sharp, 72, British-born New Zealand poet, librarian and journalist, cancer.
- Robyn Thorn, 80, Australian swimmer, Olympic silver medalist (1964).
- Peter Unwin, 93, British diplomat, ambassador to Hungary (1983–1986) and Denmark (1986–1988).
- Mark Dundas, 4th Marquess of Zetland, 88, British hereditary peer, member of the House of Lords (1989–1999).

=== 25 ===
- Michael F. Adams, 77, American political staffer and educator, president of the University of Georgia (1997–2013).
- Bill Allen, 79, Canadian politician, Saskatchewan MLA (1975–1982).
- Robert Joseph Banks, 97, American Roman Catholic prelate, auxiliary bishop of Boston (1985–1990) and bishop of Green Bay (1990–2003).
- Inderjit Singh Bindra, 84, Indian sports administrator, president of the BCCI (1993–1996).
- Henry Bosch, 95, Australian businessman.
- Seyni Awa Camara, 81, Senegalese sculptor.
- Jean Cussac, 103, French baritone (The Swingle Singers) and music director.
- Gong Ro-myung, 93, South Korean diplomat and politician, minister of foreign affairs (1994–1996).
- Philip G. Killey, 84, American air force general.
- Dominic Kokkat, 93, Indian Syro-Malabar Catholic prelate, bishop of Gorakhpur (1984–2006).
- Lee Hae-chan, 73, South Korean politician, prime minister (2004–2006), minister of education (1998–1999) and MNA (1988–2020), cardiac arrest.
- Li Wei, 82, Chinese computer scientist.
- Gabe Lopez, 31, American songwriter and producer, lymphoma.
- Josephine Louis, 95, American billionaire heiress.
- Abhijit Majumdar, 54, Indian composer and music director (Sasura Ghara Zindabad, Balunga Toka, Daha Balunga), liver disease.
- Geoffrey Mason, 85, American television producer (ABC Sports, ESPN).
- Koumei Nakamura, 78, Japanese chef.
- Jón Ólafsson, 84, Icelandic Olympic high jumper (1964, 1968).
- Rafael Pineda, 88, Cuban-American journalist and television news reporter.
- Daniel Post, 96, American engineer.
- Chet Raymo, 89, American writer.
- Marie Rouanet, 89, French singer and writer.
- Harilyn Rousso, 79, American disability rights activist.
- Orest Salamakha, 34, Ukrainian politician, MP (since 2019), traffic collision.
- Dede Sulaeman, 69, Indonesian footballer (Persija Jakarta, national team), heart attack.
- Sir Mark Tully, 90, British journalist (BBC) and writer.
- Frederick Vreeland, 98, American politician and diplomat, ambassador to Morocco (1992–1993).
- Kazuhito Yamashita, 64, Japanese guitarist.

=== 26 ===
- Anne Agur, 72, Canadian clinical anatomist, cancer.
- Richie Beirach, 78, American jazz pianist and composer.
- Arie van den Brand, 74, Dutch politician, member of the House of Representatives (2002–2004).
- Barney Cable, 90, American basketball player (Detroit Pistons, Syracuse Nationals, St. Louis Hawks).
- Maria Constantinescu, 91, Romanian handballer (Rapid București, national team), world champion (1962).
- Danny Coughlan, 55, British singer and guitarist.
- Annette Dolphin, 74, British pharmacologist, cancer.
- Sly Dunbar, 73, Jamaican drummer (Sly and Robbie), record producer ("Underneath It All"), and songwriter ("Murder She Wrote"), cancer.
- Kirsty Duncan, 59, Canadian politician, MP (2008–2025), minister of science and sport (2015–2019), cancer.
- John Dwyer, 97, Australian Olympic field hockey player (1956).
- Sia Figiel, 59, Samoan writer, painter and alleged murderer.
- Myint Htwe, 78, Burmese politician, minister of health and sport (2016–2021).
- Frederick King Keller, 75, American television director (The Pretender, New York Undercover, Hey Dude).
- Reinhardt Kiehl, 90, German mathematician.
- Béla Lattmann, 65, Hungarian jazz bassist.
- Chuck Lefley, 76, Canadian ice hockey player (Montreal Canadiens, St. Louis Blues).
- François Lempérière, 99, French civil engineer.
- Ian McDougall, 87, Canadian jazz trombonist and academic.
- Robert Nazaryan, 69, Armenian politician, mayor of Yerevan (2001–2003).
- Produce Pete, 80, American chef and television personality.
- Carole Sabiston, 86, English-born Canadian textile artist.
- Alexei Simașchevici, 96, Moldovan physicist, member of the Academy of Sciences of Moldova.
- Len Simms, 81, Canadian politician, Newfoundland and Labrador MHA (1979–1995).
- N. Sundaram, 72, Indian politician, Tamil Nadu MLA (1996–2001, 2006–2011), fall.
- Tan Yee Khan, 85, Malaysian badminton player.
- Clendon Thomas, 90, American football player (Los Angeles Rams, Pittsburgh Steelers).
- Maggie Van Ostrand, 92, American writer, humorist and columnist.
- James "Dr. Daddio" Walker, 86, American radio personality.

=== 27 ===
- David Andrews, 90, British actor and director (Take the High Road, Hollyoaks, Grange Hill). (death announced on this date)
- Robert G. Bottoms, 81, American education executive, president of DePauw University (1986–2008).
- Brad Branson, 67, American basketball player (Cleveland Cavaliers, Indiana Pacers).
- Louis J. Ceci, 98, American judge, justice of the Wisconsin Supreme Court (1982–1993).
- António Chainho, 88, Portuguese fado guitarist.
- Vladislav Chernushenko, 90, Russian conductor.
- Wiley Drake, 82, American minister and radio host.
- Ernie Fage, 72, Canadian politician, Nova Scotia MLA (1997–2009).
- Jim Ferguson, 85, Australian diplomat, ambassador to Peru (1981–1983).
- Michael Greenhalgh, 82, British art historian.
- Joan Hall, 90, British politician, MP (1970–1974).
- Boris Ignatyev, 85, Russian football player (Volga Gorky, Dynamo Makhachkala) and manager (national team), stomach cancer.
- Akira Iriye, 91, Japanese-American historian.
- Günter Kilian, 75, German Olympic water polo player (1968, 1976).
- Mingo Lewis, 72, American percussionist and drummer (Santana, Al Di Meola, The Tubes), lung disease.
- Fernando Mamede, 74, Portuguese Olympic athlete (1972, 1976, 1984).
- Gerald M. McCue, 97, American architect, dean of the Harvard Graduate School of Design (1980–1992).
- Dennis Milton, 64, American boxer.
- Parviz Nouri, 87, Iranian film critic, screenwriter and director.
- Nigel Ogden, 71, British theatre organist and radio presenter (The Organist Entertains).
- John Overington, 79, American politician, member of the West Virginia House of Delegates (2003–2019).
- Neil Pappalardo, 83, American technology businessman, cofounder of Meditech.
- Joan Pujal Areny, 88, Andorran politician and businessman, mayor of Sant Julià de Lòria (1982–1983, 2000–2003) and member of the General Council (1992–1993).
- Shirley Raines, 58, American non-profit founder.
- James Sallis, 81, American writer (Drive, Driven), poet and biographer.
- Paul Sample, 78, British cartoonist (Ogri) and illustrator.
- Kei Taguchi, 93, Japanese actor (An actress, King Kong Escapes, Lucky Dragon No. 5).
- Tato, 64, Brazilian footballer (Coritiba, Fluminense, Elche), esophageal cancer.
- Rado Vidošić, 64, Croatian-Australian football manager (Brisbane Roar, Melbourne City), cancer.
- Gloria Wade-Gayles, 88, American educator and author.

=== 28 ===
- Sadhvi Prem Baisa, 26, Indian religious storyteller, respiratory failure.
- Antoine Bangui, 92, Chadian politician and author.
- Maroochy Barambah, 70, Australian Turrbal elder and mezzo-soprano singer.
- Nilton César, 86, Brazilian singer.
- Chung Sanghwa, 93, South Korean dansaekhwa painter.
- Josef Dvorak, 91, Austrian theologian. (death announced on this date)
- Fobazi Ettarh, 36–37, American academic and librarian.
- Þorsteinn frá Hamri, 79, Icelandic writer.
- Peter Hargitai, 79, Hungarian-born American poet, novelist and translator.
- Cezary Jędrzycki, 57, Polish Olympic rower (1992).
- Ji Han-jae, 89, South Korean hapkido martial artist.
- Vénus Khoury-Ghata, 88, French-Lebanese poet and writer.
- Thomas Kunnunkal, 99, Indian Jesuit priest and educationist, chairman of the Central Board of Secondary Education (1980–1987).
- Peter Lee, 80, English cricketer (Northamptonshire, Lancashire).
- Bryan Loren, 59, American songwriter ("Do the Bartman").
- John MacDonald, 89, Hong Kong racing car driver.
- Dan McQuade, 43, American journalist and writer, cancer.
- Franco Menichelli, 84, Italian gymnast, Olympic champion (1964).
- Brian O'Shea, 81, Irish politician, senator (1987–1989) and TD (1989–2011).
- Adekunle Ojora, 93, Nigerian oil and gas executive.
- Ajit Pawar, 66, Indian politician, deputy chief minister of Maharashtra (since 2024), plane crash.
- Robert W. Pratt, 78, American jurist, judge (since 1997) and chief judge (2006–2011) of the U.S. District Court for the Southern District of Iowa.
- Diógenes Quintero, 36, Colombian lawyer, human rights defender and politician, member of the Chamber of Representatives (since 2022), plane crash.
- Jean de Dieu Razafimahatratra, 78, Malagasy Olympic judoka (1972). (death announced on this date)
- Eric Russell, 89, Scottish cricketer (Middlesex, Berkshire, England national team).
- Dominick Salvatore, 85, American economist.
- Charles Victor Thompson, 55, American convicted murderer, execution by lethal injection.
- Kwok Yau, 98, Taiwanese Olympic footballer (1960).

=== 29 ===
- René Backmann, 81, French journalist (Le Nouvel Obs) and humanitarian.
- Ted Berger, 85, American arts activist.
- Marco Bülow, 54, German journalist and politician, MP (2002–2021).
- Axel Burrough, 79, British architect.
- Eric Cameron, 90, Canadian artist.
- João Canijo, 68, Portuguese film director (Get a Life, Blood of My Blood, Bad Living).
- Jacques Collignon, 89, French Olympic swimmer (1956).
- Nicholas Colquhoun-Denvers, 76–77, British polo official.
- Graham E. Fuller, 89, American political analyst, heart-related problems.
- René Galy-Dejean, 93, French politician, Deputy (1991–2007) and mayor of the 15th arrondissement of Paris (1983–2008).
- Heather Goodall, 75, Australian academic and historian.
- Harry Huffaker, 86, American marathon swimmer.
- Kenneth Hyman, 97, American film executive (Warner Bros.-Seven Arts) and producer (The Dirty Dozen, The Hill).
- Ilkka Antero Kanko, 91, Finnish chess player.
- Woodie King Jr., 88, American theatre director, founder of the New Federal Theatre, complications from heart surgery.
- Scott Laidlaw, 72, American football player (Dallas Cowboys), Super Bowl champion (XII).
- Suzannah Lessard, 81, American writer, complications from endometrial cancer.
- Noel Mayo, 88, American industrial designer.
- Wojciech Michniewski, 78, Polish composer and conductor.
- Stig Millehaugen, 56, Norwegian convicted murderer.
- Philippe Morillon, 90, French general and politician, commander of the United Nations Forces in Bosnia (1992–1993) and MEP (1999–2009).
- Michael Nobbs, 72, Australian field hockey player (national team) and coach (India national team).
- Ary Paghetti, 78, Brazilian footballer (Goiás), heart attack.
- Georghios Pikis, 87, Cypriot judge, president of the Supreme Court (1995–2004) and judge of the ICC (2003–2009).
- Michael H. Prosser, 89, American academic.
- Peter Ransley, 94, British screenwriter (Tales of the Unexpected), playwright and novelist, bronchopneumonia.
- Sentoryū Henri, 56, Japanese martial artist and sumo wrestler, lung disease.
- Raimonds Staprans, 99, Latvian-American visual artist and playwright.
- Terry Swinscoe, 91, English footballer (Mansfield Town).
- Willie Taylor, 79, American basketball player.
- Craig Tracy, 80, American mathematician.
- Jim Wallace, Baron Wallace of Tankerness, 71, Scottish politician, deputy first minister (1999–2005), member of the House of Lords (since 2007), and twice acting first minister, complications from surgery.
- Michiko Yamamoto, 89, Japanese writer.

=== 30 ===
- Mohammad-Hadi Abdekhodaei, 87, Iranian ayatollah, MP (1980–1988, 1992–1996) and member of the Assembly of Experts (2016–2024).
- Geraldine Barniville, 83, Irish squash and tennis player.
- Abdelhadi Belkhayat, 85, Moroccan singer.
- Bruce Bentley, 81, Australian footballer (Carlton).
- Chip Berlet, 76, American journalist and author, leukemia.
- Yaw Brempong-Yeboah, 71, Ghanaian politician, MP (2001–2009).
- Martin Bruns, 65, Swiss baritone and academic.
- Paul Deheuvels, 77, French statistician and probabilist.
- Arthur P. Dempster, 96, American mathematician.
- Diana Ferrus, 72, South African writer.
- John Heneghan, 79, Irish Gaelic footballer (Longford).
- Henner Hofmann, 75, Mexican cinematographer (Immortal Combat, Vampires: Los Muertos, Gallowwalkers) and film producer.
- Parthenon Huxley, 70, American musician (ELO Part II).
- X. J. Kennedy, 96, American poet.
- Christa Lang, 82, German actress (What's Up, Doc?, The Champagne Murders, Alphaville) and screenwriter.
- Mark Marquess, 78, American college baseball coach (Stanford Cardinal).
- Flavien Joseph Melki, 94, Syrian Syriac Catholic hierarch, auxiliary bishop (1995–1997) and curial bishop (1997–2011) of Antioch.
- Catherine O'Hara, 71, Canadian-American actress (Schitt's Creek, Beetlejuice, Home Alone), Emmy winner (1982, 2019), pulmonary embolism.
- Wolfgang Pfeifer, 90, German footballer (Einheit Dresden, Dynamo Dresden, East Germany national team).
- Larry Reed, 81, American shadow puppeteer.
- H. Robert Reynolds, 91, American musician and conductor.
- Hernán Rodríguez, 92, Chilean footballer (Colo-Colo, national team).
- David Triesman, Baron Triesman, 82, British politician and trade union leader, member of the House of Lords (since 2004).
- Praski Vitti, 89, Russian Chuvash artist, painter, and muralist.
- Irwin Weil, 97, American academic.
- Demond Wilson, 79, American actor (Sanford and Son, The New Odd Couple, Me and the Kid) and author, complications from cancer.
- Bruno Zorzi, 88, Australian footballer (Fitzroy).

=== 31 ===
- Ismael Ahmed, 79, American health official, director of the Michigan Department of Health and Human Services (2007–2011).
- Maximilian Aichern, 93, Austrian Roman Catholic prelate, bishop of Linz (1981–2005).
- Nataša Bokal, 58, Slovenian Olympic skier (1992, 1998, 2002), cancer.
- Francesco Calogero, 90, Italian physicist and peace activist, secretary-general of the Pugwash Conferences on Science and World Affairs (1989–1997).
- Sultan Mehmood Chaudhry, 71, Pakistani politician, president (since 2021) and prime minister (1996–2001) of Azad Kashmir.
- Paolo Cristoni, 80, Italian politician, deputy (1987–1992).
- Spiro Debarski, 92, Bulgarian football player (Lokomotiv Sofia, national team) and manager (Nea Salamis).
- Gisela Engeln-Müllges, 85, German mathematician, academic and artist.
- Kazuhiko Hasegawa, 80, Japanese film director (The Man Who Stole the Sun), multiple organ failure complicated by pneumonia.
- Masaru Ikeda, 83, Japanese voice actor (Yatterman, Sakura Wars, One Piece), heart attack.
- Fathi Kameel, 70, Kuwaiti footballer (Al-Tadamon, national team).
- Hans Petter Lundgaard, 90, Norwegian jurist.
- Fitim Makashi, 81, Albanian actor (The Death of the Horse, Rrugicat që kërkonin diell, Nga mesi i errësirës).
- Wally Maxwell, 92, Canadian ice hockey player (Toronto Maple Leafs).
- Ricardo Melchior, 78, Spanish politician, president of the Island Council of Tenerife (1999–2013).
- Salim Sayyid Mengga, 74, Indonesian military officer and politician, vice governor of West Sulawesi (since 2025), member of the House of Representatives (2009–2016).
- Joe Mulholland, 85, Irish television executive.
- Billy Bass Nelson, 75, American Hall of Fame bass guitarist (Parliament-Funkadelic).
- Len Pavy, 89, Australian cricketer (Western Australia).
- Raghunatha Reddy, 82, Indian actor (Rowdy Durbar, Pelli Pandiri, Srimathi Vellostha).
- Rick Renick, 81, American baseball player (Minnesota Twins).
- Doug Reynolds, 92, Australian footballer (Footscray, Richmond).
- Gustavo Sánchez Vásquez, 62, Mexican politician, municipal president of Mexicali (2016–2019) and senator (since 2024).
- Fabio Scuto, 68, Italian journalist (la Repubblica).
- Gerardo Taracena, 55, Mexican actor (Apocalypto, Man on Fire, Narcos: Mexico).
- Gillian White, 86, British-born Swiss sculptor.
- Desmond Williams, 93, British architect.
- Burt Wolf, 87, American journalist and writer.
- Normana Wight, 89, Australian artist.
