= Bruce Bentley =

Australian rules footballer (1944–2026)

Personal information
- Full name: Bruce Edward Bentley
- Born: 9 September 1944
- Died: 30 January 2026 (aged 81)
- Original team: East Brighton
- Height: 183 cm (6 ft 0 in)
- Weight: 79 kg (174 lb)
- Position: Midfielder

Playing career
Years	Club	Games (Goals)
1964	Carlton	1 (0)

Bruce Edward Bentley (9 September 1944 – 30 January 2026) was an Australian rules footballer who played with Carlton in the Victorian Football League (VFL). His father, Perce Bentley, also played and coached in the VFL. Bruce Bentley died on 30 January 2026, at the age of 81.
