= Alain Monney =

Swiss comedian and actor (1951–2026)

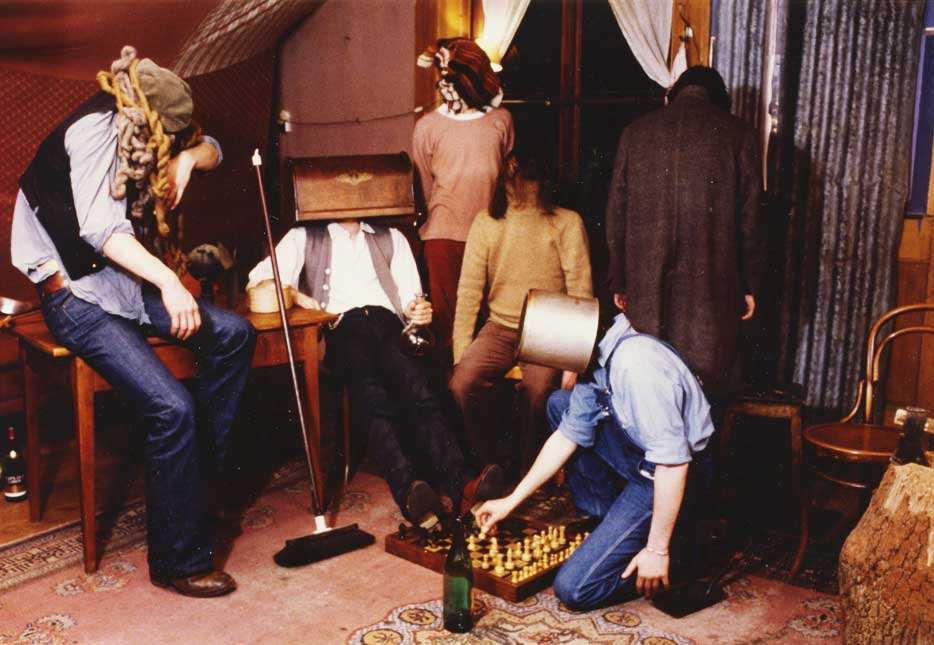
- Monney with folk group Aristide Padygros in 1978
- Born: 12 December 1951; Carouge, Switzerland
- Died: 22 January 2026 (aged 74)
- Occupations: Comedian; Actor

Alain Monney (12 December 1951 – 22 January 2026) was a Swiss comedian and actor.

== Biography ==
A founding member of the folk group Aristide Padygros, his first comedic acts were with RTS Couleur 3 in 1984. His most popular radio show was Carabine FM, though he also created the television series Les Pique-Meurons. In 2010, he co-wrote the crime series L'Heure du secret.

Monney died from a brain tumour on 22 January 2026, at the age of 74.
