= Alexandros Papadogonas =

Greek politician (1931–2026)

- Αλέξανδρος Παπαδόγγονας

Member of the Hellenic Parliament
- In office 17 November 1974 – 10 March 2000
- Constituency: Athens A

Personal details
- Born: 12 July 1931 Tripoli, Greece
- Died: 16 January 2026 (aged 94) Athens, Greece
- Party: New Democracy
- Parent: Dionysios Papadongonas (father)

Alexandros Papadogonas (Greek: Αλέξανδρος Παπαδόγγονας; 12 July 1931 – 16 January 2026) was a Greek politician. A member of New Democracy, he served in the Hellenic Parliament from 1974 to 2000. He was the son of Dionysios Papadongonas, a colonel in the Greek Army and a leading collaborationist with Nazi Germany during the Axis occupation of Greece.

Papadogonas died in Athens on 16 January 2026, at the age of 94.
