= Mark Batzer =

American geneticist (1961–2026)

Mark A. Batzer (October 26, 1961 – January 21, 2026) was an American geneticist who was a LSU Boyd Professor and held the Dr. Mary Lou Applewhite Distinguished Professor at Louisiana State University. Batzer worked in genomics and in the understanding of Alu elements. He was elected a Fellow of the American Association for the Advancement of Science in 2008. In 2020, Batzer was named a Senior Member of the National Academy of Inventors for holding multiple patents in Forensic DNA analysis.

== Education ==
Batzer received his undergraduate degree at Michigan State University and a PhD from Louisiana State University in Baton Rouge. He completed post-doctoral work at LSU Health Sciences Center identifying the subfamily structure of Alu elemnts.

== Personal life ==
Batzer was married to Pam Richard, a pediatrician. He died on January 21, 2026, at the age of 64.
