= Richard Schoon =

Singaporean field hockey player (1928–2026)

Personal information
- Full name: Richard Roland Schoon
- Nationality: Singaporean
- Born: 23 June 1928
- Died: 11 January 2026 (aged 97)

Sport
- Sport: Field hockey
- Club: Singapore Recreation Club, Singapore

Richard Roland Schoon (23 June 1928 – 11 January 2026) was a Singaporean field hockey player. He competed in the men's tournament at the 1956 Summer Olympics.

Schoon died on 11 January 2026, at the age of 97.
