= Alan Sanches =

Brazilian politician (1968–2026)

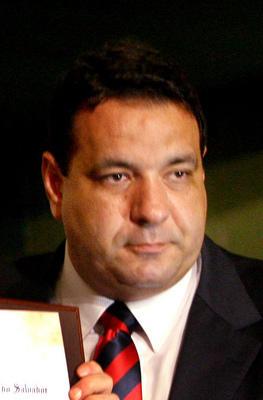
- Sanches in 2010

Member of the Legislative Assembly of Bahia
- In office 1 February 2011 – 17 January 2026

Personal details
- Born: Alan Eduardo Sanches dos Santos; 13 January 1968 Salvador, Brazil
- Died: 17 January 2026 (aged 58) Salvador, Brazil
- Party: PRP (2004–2006); PSDB (2006–2008); PMDB (2008–2011); PSD (2011–2016); DEM (2016–2022); UNIÃO (2022–2026)
- Education: Escola Bahiana de Medicina e Saúde Pública
- Occupation: Doctor

Alan Eduardo Sanches dos Santos (13 January 1968 – 17 January 2026) was a Brazilian politician. A member of multiple political parties, he served in the Legislative Assembly of Bahia from 2011 to 2026.

Sanches died in Salvador on 17 January 2026, at the age of 58.
