= Carl Sommer =

American businessman (1930–2026)

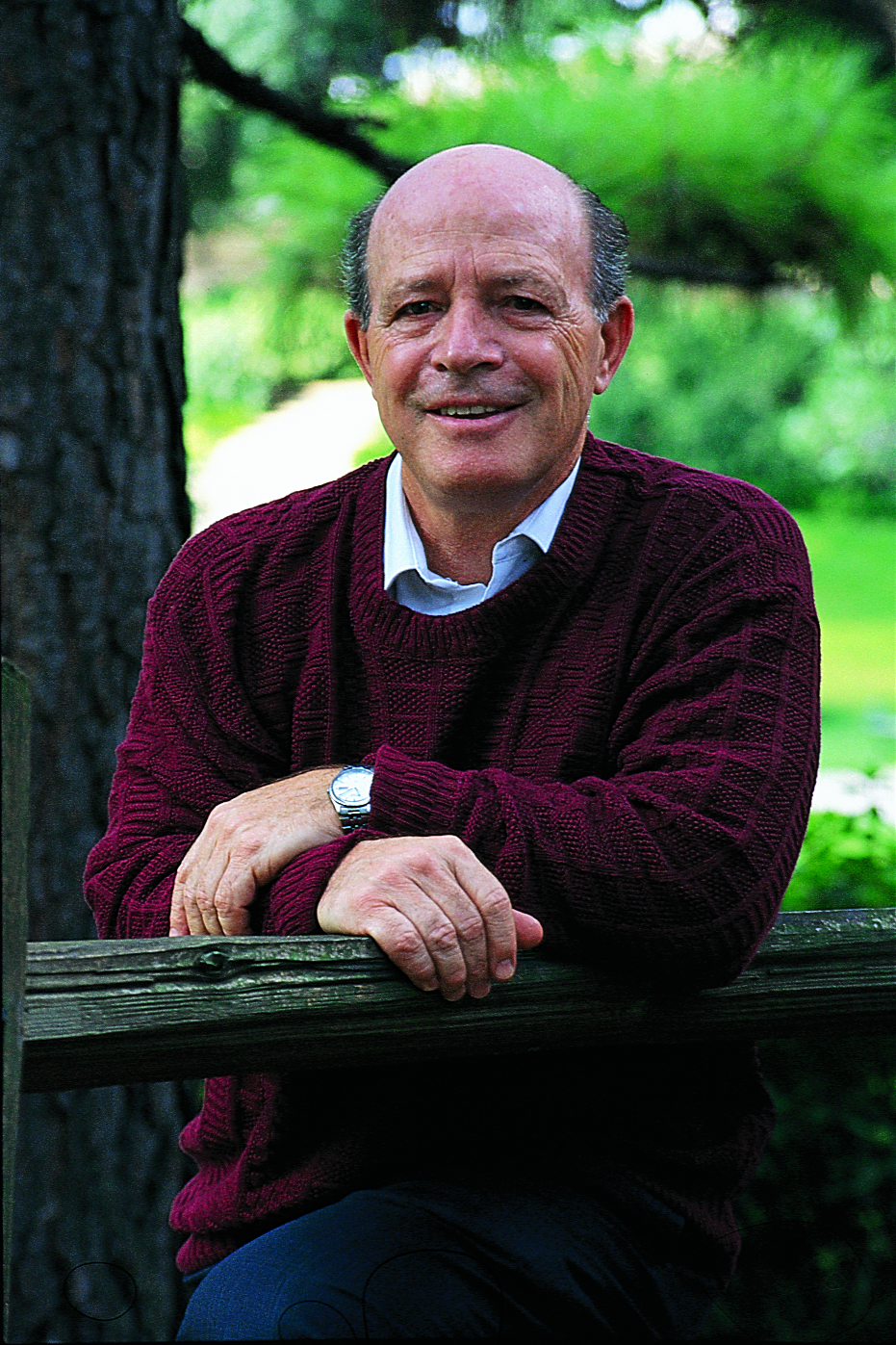
- Born: October 17, 1930
- Died: January 16, 2026 (aged 95)
- Occupations: Author, educator
- Spouse: Hildegard Sommer
- Writing career
- Notable work: Another Sommer-Time Story series

Carl Sommer (October 17, 1930 – January 16, 2026) was an American author, educator and businessman.

== Life and career ==
Sommer was born on October 17, 1930. He was the founder of Advance Publishing Incorporated, Digital Cornerstone, and Reliable EDM. His notable works include the Sommer-Time Story series, Phonics Adventure and Number Success are all a part of the SommerLearning.com literacy program. The Award-Winning Another Sommer-Time Story series inspired a television series called Another Sommer-Time Adventure on the children's channel, Tri-State Christian Television and Digital television. The show focuses on imparting values and principles of success. Sommer's company, Reliable EDM, was founded in 1986 and is the largest electrical discharge machining shop in North America.

Sommer died on January 16, 2026, at the age of 95.
