= Zeno Bianu =

French writer (1950–2026)

Zeno Bianu (28 July 1950 – 9 January 2026) was a French writer. He died on 9 January 2026, at the age of 75.
