= József Láyer =

Hungarian politician (1955–2026)

Member of the National Assembly of Hungary
- In office 18 June 1998 – 15 May 2006

Personal details
- Born: 21 June 1955 Békéscsaba, Hungary
- Died: 6 January 2026 (aged 70) Bagamér, Hungary
- Party: Fidesz
- Education: University of Debrecen
- Occupation: Teacher

József Láyer (21 June 1955 – 6 January 2026) was a Hungarian politician. A member of Fidesz, he served in the National Assembly from 1998 to 2006.

Láyer died in Bagamér on 6 January 2026, at the age of 70.
