= Lucyna Pietrzyk =

Polish politician (1956–2026)

Member of the Sejm
- In office 19 September 1993 – 20 October 1997

Personal details
- Born: 25 December 1956 Radom, Poland
- Died: 19 January 2026 (aged 69)
- Party: PSL
- Education: Jagiellonian University
- Occupation: Police officer

Lucyna Pietrzyk (25 December 1956 – 19 January 2026) was a Polish politician. A member of the Polish People's Party, she served in the Sejm from 1993 to 1997.

Pietrzyk died on 19 January 2026, at the age of 69.
