= Frédéric Cerdal =

French actor and stage director (1944–2026)

- Born: 9 May 1944; Paris, France
- Died: 3 January 2026 (aged 81); Limoges, France
- Education: Conservatoire national supérieur d'art dramatique
- Occupations: Actor; Stage director

Frédéric Cerdal (French: [fʁedeʁik sɛʁdal]; 9 May 1944 – 3 January 2026) was a French actor and stage director.

Cerdal was primarily active in dubbing, notably serving as the voice for Michael Caine in Batman Begins and several video games.

Cerdal died in Limoges on 3 January 2026, at the age of 81.

== Filmography ==
- Le Brin de muguet (1984)
- Marriage of the Century (1985)
- A (K)night in Paris (2020)
- Les Liens invisibles (2022)
