= Kim Vo =

American hairstylist (1970/1971–2026)

Kim Vo (1970 or 1971 – January 2026) was an American hairstylist. He starred in the reality television show Blowing LA. Vo died in January 2026, at the age of 55.
