= Yury Yemelyanov =

Soviet-Russian historian (1937–2026)

- Юрий Емельянов
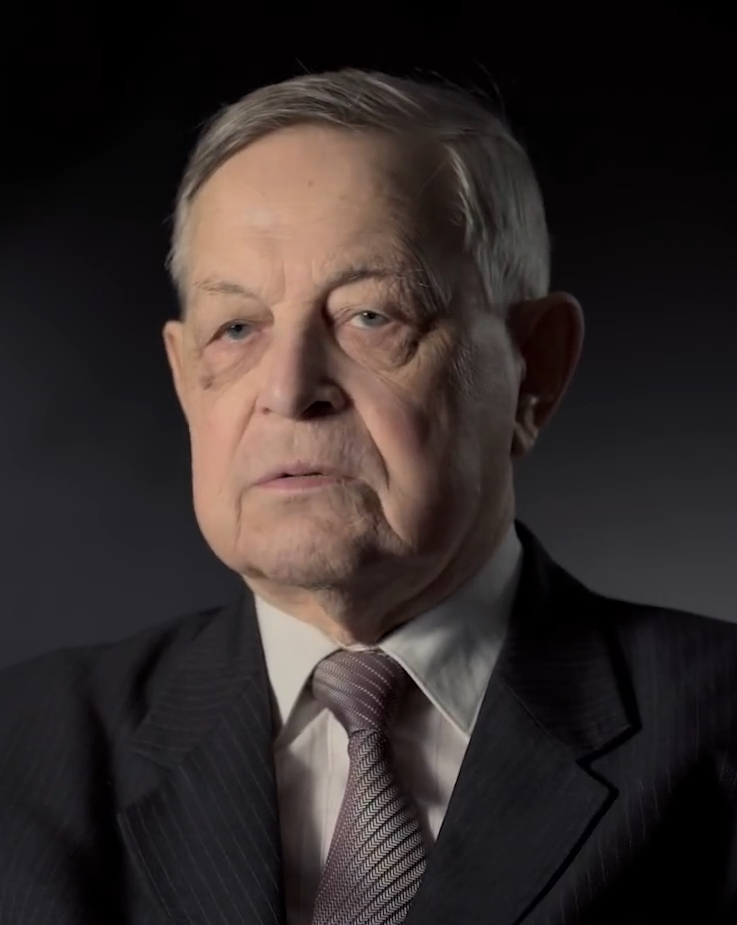
- Yemelyanov in 2019
- Born: Yury Vasilyevich Yemelyanov; 16 June 1937; Moscow, Russian SFSR, USSR
- Died: 16 January 2026 (aged 88); Moscow, Russia
- Education: Candidate of Historical Sciences
- Alma mater: Moscow State Institute of International Relations; School No. 1282
- Occupations: Historian, writer, opinion writer, political scientist
- Employer: Institute of World Economy and International Relations (1960–1966)
- Political party: Communist Party of the Russian Federation

Yury Vasilyevich Yemelyanov (Russian: Юрий Васильевич Емельянов; 16 June 1937 – 16 January 2026) was a Soviet-Russian historian and author, who was a Candidate of History Sciences (1979). He was a laureate of the International Sholokhov Prize (2003).

== Life and career ==
Yemelyanov was born on 16 June 1937, into a family of Communist Party members. During the WWII he was evacuated to Barnaul. In 1960 graduated from MGIMO. He worked at IMEMO and Russian Academy of Sciences. He was also a member of the Communist Party of the Russian Federation.

He was Stalin's and Bukharin's biographer.

Yemelyanov died on 16 January 2026, at the age of 88.
