= Kevin Healy (footballer) =

Australian rules footballer (1937–2026)

Personal information
- Born: 26 November 1937
- Died: 15 January 2026 (aged 88)
- Original team: Donnybrook
- Height: 180 cm (5 ft 11 in)
- Weight: 76 kg (168 lb)

Playing career
Years	Club	Games (Goals)
1959	Collingwood	2 (1)

Kevin Healy (26 November 1937 – 15 January 2026) was an Australian rules footballer who played with Collingwood in the Victorian Football League (VFL). Healy died on 15 January 2026, at the age of 88.
