= Muhammad Bashir Saliu =

Nigerian Islamic scholar (1950–2026)

Muhammad Bashir Saliu Al-Fulani
- Born: Muhammad Bashir; 1950; Ilorin, Nigeria
- Died: 19 January 2026 (aged 75)
- Other name: Imam Fulani
- Citizenship: Nigerian
- Father: Imam Saliu Omo Onida Abdulkadir
- Honours: Officer of the Niger (OON)

Muhammad Bashir Saliu Al-Fulani Pronouciation OON (1950 – 19 January 2026) was a Nigerian Islamic scholar and the 12th chief Imam of Ilorin. He was often referred to as Imam Fulani. He was appointed by the former emir of Ilorin, Zuluqarnain Muhammadu Gambari, following the death of Imam Musa Ahmad in 1983. His father, Imam Saliu Omo Onida Abdulkadir was the seventh chief Imam of Ilorin Emirate.

== Education ==
Saliu finished his Quranic education from the Magaji Baboko Quranic School located in Ilorin, subsequently he attended Shaykh Abubakar Sakama school from 1963 to 1965 after which he went under the tutelage of Shaykh Musa Nuhu Elere for seven years in Ilorin.

== Leadership and religious role ==
Saliu led the annual Ramadan Tefsir in Ilorin usually done in the emir's palace alongside other ulamas in the city including the Imam Imale, the Imam Gambari, the Ajanasi Agba of Ilorin, Alfa Rabana and the chief mufasir etc.

During the COVID-19 pandemic because of the measures given by the government regarding movement restrictions of the citizens of Nigeria, he led the Eid al-Adha prayer of the Muslim virtually.

== Death ==
Imam Bashir died on 19 January 2026, at the age of 75 due to an illness, he spent over 40 years leading the muslim community in Ilorin and Kwara State.
