= Jean-Max Causse =

French actor (1940–2026)

- Born: 3 June 1940; Bourg-en-Bresse, France
- Died: 2 January 2026 (aged 85)
- Occupations: Film director, screenwriter, actor

Jean-Max Causse (3 June 1940 – 2 January 2026) was a French actor.

== Life and career ==
Causse was born in Bourg-en-Bresse on 3 June 1940. During the 1970s, he and Jean-Marie Rodon together co-managed the Écoles Cinéma Club, Christine Cinéma Club and Grand Action which had more than 200 films in its catalogue. In 2004, after he separated with his partner, Causse took control of the remaining cinemas.

In 1973, Causse lost his daughter during a fire at the Collège Édouard-Pailleron. Causse died on 2 January 2026, at the age of 85.
