= Alicja Kędzia =

Polish neurologist and anatomist (1941–2026)

- Born: 23 March 1941
- Died: 22 January 2026 (aged 84); Wrocław, Poland
- Education: Academy of Medicine in Wrocław (MD, 1963)
- Known for: Research on cerebral venous system development (including the falcine sinus); quantitative and imaging methods in neuroanatomy; mathematical modelling in prenatal growth studies
- Scientific career
- Fields: Neurology, anatomy, neuroanatomy
- Workplaces: Wroclaw Medical University

Alicja Kędzia (23 March 1941 – 22 January 2026) was a Polish neurologist and anatomist, a professor of medical sciences, and a long-time head of the chair and Department of Normal Anatomy (Katedra i Zakład Anatomii Prawidłowej) at Wroclaw Medical University. She was named an honorary member of the Polish Anatomical Society (Polskie Towarzystwo Anatomiczne). She also served within the Wrocław Scientific Society, including as secretary of its audit committee (Komisja Rewizyjna).

== Education and career ==
Kędzia graduated from the Academy of Medicine in Wrocław in 1963. She obtained neurology specialization. She earned a PhD in 1972 and a habilitation in 1992 (on the morphology of the human cerebral venous system across fetal, adult and senescent periods, with clinical aspects). She received the title of professor in 2000.

She was professionally affiliated with Wroclaw Medical University, where she led the chair and Department of Normal Anatomy for many years. According to national academic records, she supervised doctoral theses and served as a reviewer in doctoral and habilitation proceedings.

== Research ==
Kędzia was the author and co-author of approximately 446 publications. Kędzia's research focused on neuroanatomy and clinical anatomy, particularly:

- macro- and micro-angioarchitecture of the human cerebral venous system across the lifespan, including prenatal development;
- dural structures and venous sinuses, including developmental variants;
- quantitative and computer-assisted approaches in anatomy (image processing and mathematical modelling), and early applications of fractal geometry to neuroanatomical and clinical material.

Her publications included work on the falcine sinus, a venous structure present during fetal development that may persist and be associated with vascular malformations.

She authored an atlas of the human cerebral venous system, based on her own anatomical research. She conducted unique research on the falcine sinus, which runs within the cerebral falx (falx cerebri) and connects the vein of Galen with the superior sagittal sinus. This structure is physiologically present during fetal development and disappears after birth, and its persistence after birth is associated with malformation of the vein of Galen and other vascular anomalies[4]. Professor Alicja Kędzia's research interests included the macro- and microangioarchitecture of the human cerebral venous system in the prenatal, adult, and senile periods. She implemented new research techniques in neuroanatomical research: infrared, ultraviolet, and image processing systems, and initiated and co-authored the development of mathematical models for the assessment of prenatal growth processes. She was one of the first to use fractal geometry in neuroanatomical research: analysis of the course of growth and involution processes, determination of fractal dimensions of brain vessels, fractal analysis of subdural hematomas.

== Selected works ==
- Kędzia, Alicja; Derkowski, Wojciech (December 2024). "Modern methods of neuroanatomical and neurophysiological research". MethodsX. 13 102881. doi:10.1016/j.mex.2024.102881. PMC 11340600. PMID 39176151.
- Derkowski, Wojciech; Kędzia, Alicja; Dudek, Krzysztof; Glonek, Michał (2024). "Morphometric evaluation of the anterior cranial fossa during the prenatal stage in humans and its clinical implications". PLOS ONE. 19 (12) e0309184. Bibcode:2024PLoSO..1909184D. doi:10.1371/journal.pone.0309184.
- Kędzia, Alicja; Dudek, Krzysztof; Ziajkiewicz, Monika; Wolańczyk, Maciej; Seredyn, Anna; Derkowski, Wojciech; Domagała, Zbigniew A. (2022). "The morphometrical and topographical evaluation of the superior gluteal nerve in the prenatal period". PLOS ONE. 17 (8) e0273397. Bibcode:2022PLoSO..1773397K. doi:10.1371/journal.pone.0273397. PMC 9417028. PMID 36018841.
- Dudek, Krzysztof; Nowakowska-Kotas, Marta; Kędzia, Alicja (2018). "Mathematical models of human cerebellar development in the fetal period". Journal of Anatomy. 232 (4): 596–603. doi:10.1111/joa.12767. PMC 5835794. PMID 29315634.
- Dudek, Krzysztof; Kędzia, Wojciech; Kędzia, Emilia; Kędzia, Alicja; Derkowski, Wojciech (September 2017). "Mathematical modelling of the growth of human fetus anatomical structures". Anatomical Science International. 92 (4): 521–529. doi:10.1007/s12565-016-0353-y. PMC 5511295. PMID 27393150.
- Kędzia, Alicja (2004). Układ żylny mózgu człowieka i jego znaczenie kliniczne. Wrocław: Urban & Partner (Elsevier Urban & Partner). ISBN 978-83-89581-26-6.
- Kędzia, A.; Rybaczuk, M.; Dymecki, J. (1997). "Fractal estimation of the senile brain atrophy". Folia Neuropathologica. 35 (4): 237–240. PMID 9833401.
