= Nabaloum Dramane =

Ivorian-born Burkinabe boxer (1967–2026)

Personal information
- Nationality: Ivory Coast; Burkina Faso
- Born: 1967 Ivory Coast
- Died: 15 January 2026 (aged 58) Ouagadougou, Burkina Faso
- Weight: Featherweight

Boxing career

Boxing record
- Wins: 29
- Win by KO: 21
- Losses: 3
- Draws: 3
- No contests: 0

Nabaloum Dramane (1967 – 15 January 2026), nicknamed Boum Boum, was an Ivorian-born Burkinabe boxer.

== Life and career ==
Dramane was born in Ivory Coast. At an early age, Ouagadougou he discovered boxing and was trained by Jean-Pierre Mahé. He began his boxing career in 1992, defeating Anor Amissah by knockout in Ouagadougou. After his first boxing match, he won several matches by knockouts, and defeated Firmin Abissi from Benin by knockout in the second round.

In January 1994, Dramane won the African featherweight title after defeating Joe Orewa from Nigeria by knockout in the sixth round. In August 1994, he defended his title after defeating David Armstrong from Togo by knockout in the second round, and again in February 1995, defeating Sunday Okolie from Nigeria by technical knockout in the eighth round.

In April 1996, Dramane won the WBC international featherweight title after defeating Nelson Ramon Medina from Venezuela by technical knockout in the sixth round. In February 1997, he defended his title after defeating Hvicha Hydrian from Russia by points, and again in April 1998, defeating Pugachev Maxim from Russia by technical knockout in the third round. In May 1999, he lost his title and was defeated by István Kovács from Hungary by unanimous decision. He retired from boxing in 2004, last defeating Adebayo Rufus in Ouagadougou by knockout.

== Death ==
Dramane died in Ouagadougou on 15 January 2026, at the age of 58.
