= Bernard Lemoux =

French businessman (1942–2026)

- Born: 13 April 1942; Rennes, German-occupied France
- Died: 4 January 2026 (aged 83)
- Occupation: Businessman

Bernard Lemoux (French: [bɛʁnaʁ ləmu]; 13 April 1942 – 4 January 2026) was a French businessman. He notably served as president of Stade Rennais FC from 1973 to 1977.

== Life and career ==
Born in Rennes on 13 April 1942, Lemoux founded the company Pavillons Bernard Lemoux. He served as president of Stade Rennais's supporters' club, but resigned in 1973 over his discontent with the club's transfer of Raymond Keruzoré to Olympique de Marseille. He became president of the club on 22 October 1973 and brought Keruzoré back to the club the following summer. After a good start to the season, he began to fall out with Keruzoré, largely due to his left-wing activism. He was dismissed from Stade Rennais over an alleged breach of contract, but the decision was overturned on appeal. In 1977, he resigned as the club's president, leaving behind a catastrophic financial situation. He helped balance the budget later on with personal donations and eventually left the business world to pursue politics.

Lemoux died on 4 January 2026, at the age of 83.
