= Huang Dongbi =

Chinese diplomat (1939–2026)

Huang Dongbi (September 1939 – 1 January 2026) was a Chinese diplomat. He served as Ambassador Extraordinary and Plenipotentiary of the People's Republic of China to Vanuatu.

== Life and career ==
Huang graduated from Foreign Affairs University in 1964, and stayed on to teach at the university in his early years. From 1978, he transferred to the diplomatic system, serving successively at the Chinese Embassy in the Netherlands, the Chinese Embassy in Jamaica, and the Department of Hong Kong, Macao and Taiwan Affairs Office of the Ministry of Foreign Affairs of the People's Republic of China, eventually rising to the position of deputy director of the Taiwan Affairs Office of the Ministry of Foreign Affairs.

In January 1995, he became the Consul General of the People's Republic of China in Chicago.

In March 1999, he was appointed the Ambassador of the People's Republic of China to Vanuatu. He left the post in March 2001.

Huang died in Beijing on 1 January 2026, at the age of 86.
