= Ivan Varshavsky =

Russian engineer and railway track foreman (1938–2026)

- Иван Варшавский
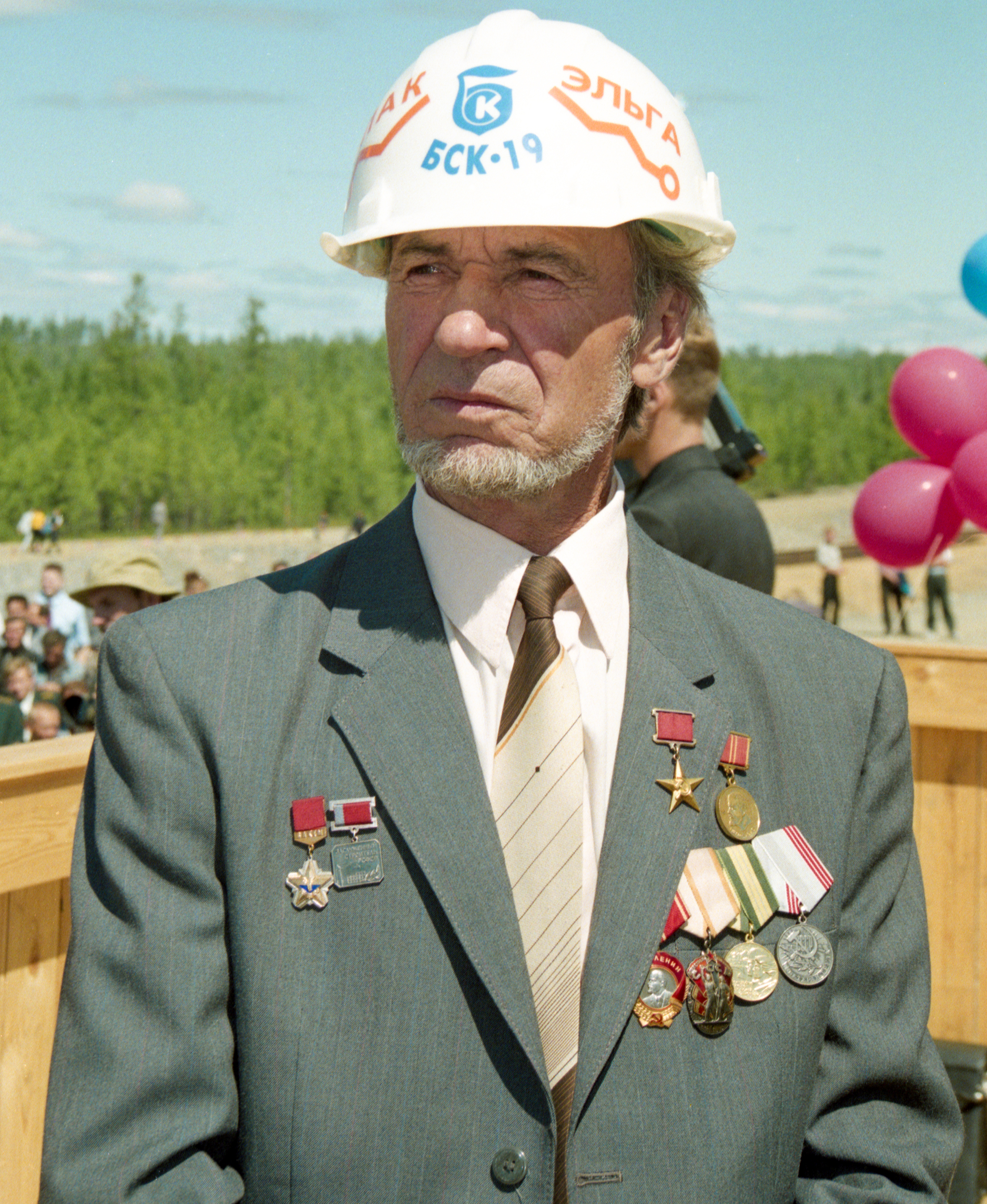
- Varshavsky in 2001
- Born: 10 April 1938; Zahnitkiv, Kryzhopil Raion, Vinnytsia Oblast, Ukrainian SSR, USSR
- Died: 3 January 2026 (aged 87); Tynda, Amur Oblast, Russia
- Occupations: Engineer, railway track foreman

Ivan Nikolayevich Varshavsky (Russian: Иван Николаевич Варшавский; 10 April 1938 – 3 January 2026) was a Russian engineer and railway track foreman. He was a recipient of the Hero of Socialist Labour (1984).

Varshavsky died in Amur Oblast on 3 January 2026, at the age of 87.
