= Arnaldo Vianna =

Brazilian politician (1947–2026)

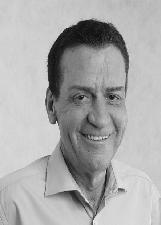
- Vianna in 2012

17th Mayor of Campos dos Goytacazes
- In office 31 March 1998 – 1 January 2005
- Preceded by: Anthony Garotinho
- Succeeded by: Carlos Campista

Member of the Chamber of Deputies of Brazil for Rio de Janeiro
- In office 1 February 2007 – 1 February 2011

Personal details
- Born: Arnaldo França Vianna; 4 November 1947 Campos dos Goytacazes, Rio de Janeiro, Brazil
- Died: 18 January 2026 (aged 78) Campos dos Goytacazes, Rio de Janeiro, Brazil
- Party: PDT
- Education: Faculdade de Medicina de Campos
- Occupation: Doctor

Arnaldo França Vianna (4 November 1947 – 18 January 2026) was a Brazilian politician. A member of the Democratic Labour Party, he served as mayor of Campos dos Goytacazes from 1998 to 2005 and was a member of the Chamber of Deputies from 2007 to 2011.

Vianna died in Campos dos Goytacazes on 18 January 2026, at the age of 78.
