= David Annoussamy =

Indian judge (1927–2026)

Hon'ble Justice David Annoussamy
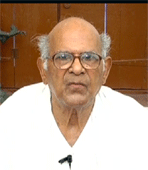
- Born: 21 October 1927; Pondicherry, French India
- Died: 17 January 2026 (aged 98)
- Education: Licence en droit (LL.B.), Government Law College; LL.D, University of Montpellier
- Years active: 1955–2026

David Annoussamy (21 October 1927 – 17 January 2026) was an Indian judge of the Madras High Court.

== Early life ==
David Annoussamy was born at Pondicherry on 21 October 1927. He received his education in French there, in what was then a French colony. After obtaining his Licence en droit (LL.B.). He proceeded to France and got admitted at the University of Montpellier, where he obtained a “Licence ès-lettres” in 1953 and a doctorate in law in 1955. He then spent 3 months in London and another three months in Geneva doing research. He completed his law studies by obtaining an LL.D degree with distinction and was awarded the prize of the year for his research work. Along with research in law he studied French literature and pedagogy and obtained the degree of M.A.L.T.

== Career ==
On his return to Puducherry he was assigned several big responsibilities by the Indian government which by then had recovered the French Establishments. He founded the Pedagogic Centre, the Law College, the English Adult Course and the Interpreters course for which he was the Director at their early stage.

His teaching activities were diverse: Pedagogy, Interpretation, Law in the French Law School, Pondicherry Law College and National Law School of Bangalore. As an adviser to the Director of the Public Instruction he planned and supervised the smooth and progressive conversion of schools of the erstwhile French Establishments from the French pattern to the Indian pattern without any harm to the pupils and the teachers.

His judicial activities, which lasted 40 years, saw him in different positions. Under the French System, he was the Presiding officer of the Labour Court and then a judge of the Superior Court of Appeal. Under the Indian system he was District and Sessions Judge and the head of several specialised Tribunals. He had the distinction of having been a judge in various capacities for 32 years in his home town without any sort of complaint.

After the Transfer he was instrumental for the smooth transition from the French judicial system to the Indian one.

He was elevated to the High Court of Tamil Nadu. After retirement he served as Vice chairman of the Central Administrative Tribunal and Chairman of the State Commission for Consumer Disputes Redressal.

He had to his credit several publications in three languages: English, French and Tamil.

== Death ==
Annoussamy died on 17 January 2026, at the age of 98.

== Bibliography ==
- Enquête sur les perspectives démographiques de l’Union Indienne, Montpellier, 1954.
- French legal system, Bangalore, 1995 re-edited in 2011.
- Judicial education and training (in collaboration), Calcutta 2000.
- Le droit indien en marche, Paris, volume I, 2001, volume II, 2009.
- Manuel de droit indien.
- Mozhi Kalviyil pudia noku,(Tamil) 1998 reedited in 2002 and in 2008.
- La littérature tamoule.
- L’intermède français en Inde, 2005, Paris and Pondichéry.
- La littérature tamoule, un trésor inconnu Paris et Pondichéry, 2011.
- Adjudication in trial courts (in collaboration), Nagpur, 2012.
- The Historical Society of Pondicherry released the book under the name of ‘Poduke-Bandikere- Puducherri- Pondicherry’.
- Le Camba-Ramayanam.
- Psychological Aspects of Language Acquisition.
- La justice en Inde.

== Positions held ==
- 1955–1958 – Professor at the School of Law of Pondicherry

Professeur à l’Ecole de Droit de Pondichéry.

- 1955–1963 – President of the Labour Court, Pondicherry
- 1963–1968 – Judge of the High Court of Appeal, Pondicherry
- 1968–1974 – District and Sessions Judge, Pondicherry
- 1974–1984 – Chief judge, Pondicherry
- 1974–1975 – Director of legal studies, Pondicherry.
- 1981 – Judiciary in France, Journal of the Bar Council of India.
- 1984–1989 – Judge, High Court of Madras.
- 1989–1992 – Vice-chairman Central Administrative Tribunal.
- 1992–1997 – Chairman, Appellate commission for consumer disputes redressal.
- 2008 – correspondent member of the Nantes IAS
- President, tate Consumer Grievances redressal forum Pondicherry
