= Ivan Nestorov =

Bulgarian actor (1933–2026)

- Иван Несторов
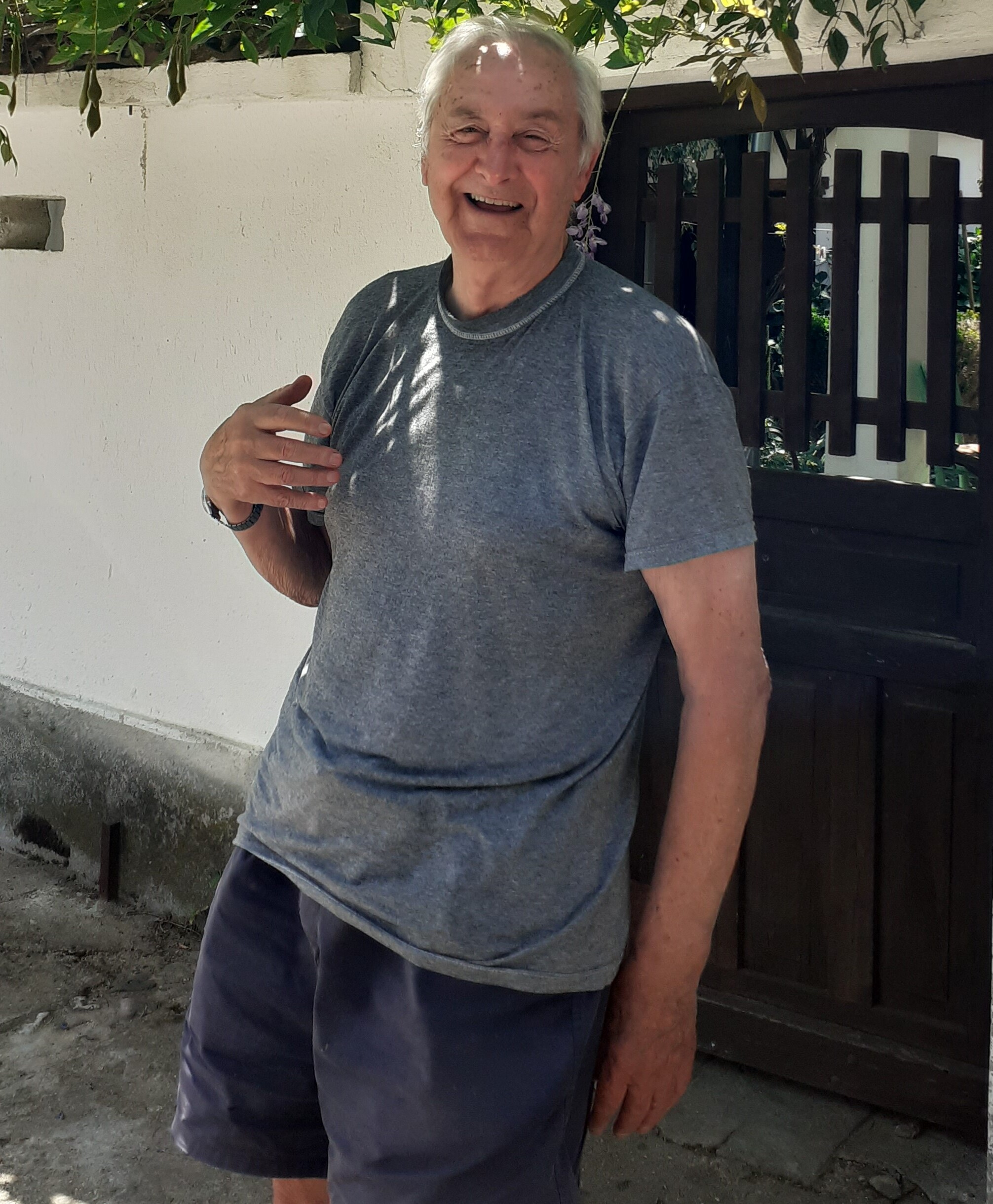
- Nestorov in 2010
- Born: Ivan Hristov Nestorov; 22 October 1933; Golyamo Selo, Pavel Banya, Bulgaria
- Died: 17 January 2026 (aged 92)
- Occupations: Film, television and theatre actor
- Years active: 1966–2018

Ivan Hristov Nestorov (Bulgarian: Иван Христов Несторов; 22 October 1933 – 17 January 2026) was a Bulgarian film, television and theatre actor. He appeared in over 30 films and television programs from 1966 to 2018, and was best known for playing Virgil Dimov in the 1981 feature film The Blow.

Nestorov died on 17 January 2026, at the age of 92.
