= Dietmar Bachmann =

Austrian politician (1934–2026)

Dieter Bachmann

Member of the Landtag of Tyrol
- In office 17 October 1965 – 13 March 1994

Personal details
- Born: 1934 Innsbruck, Tyrol, Austria
- Died: 3 January 2026 (aged 91)
- Party: Tiroler Volkspartei
- Education: University of Innsbruck
- Occupation: Business manager

Dietmar Bachmann (1934 – 3 January 2026) was an Austrian politician. A member of the Tiroler Volkspartei, he served in the Landtag of Tyrol from 1965 to 1994.

Bachmann died on 3 January 2026, at the age of 91.
