= Cristino de Vera =

Spanish painter (1931–2026)

- Born: 15 December 1931
- Died: 16 January 2026 (aged 94)
- Occupation: Painter

Cristino de Vera (15 December 1931 – 16 January 2026) was a Spanish painter. He died on 16 January 2026, at the age of 94.
