= Marie-Thérèse Lorcin =

French historian and academic (1932–2026)

- Born: 18 March 1932
- Died: 8 January 2026 (aged 93)
- Education: Lumière University Lyon 2 (DND)
- Occupations: Historian; Academic

Marie-Thérèse Lorcin (French: [maʁiteʁɛz lɔʁsɛ̃]; 18 March 1932 – 8 January 2026) was a French historian and academic.

== Life and career ==
Lorcin earned a doctorate in history from Lumière University Lyon 2, where she would become a professor. She specialized in the French Middle Ages, particularly in the Lyon and the Forez regions.

Lorcin died on 8 January 2026, at the age of 93.

== Publications ==
- Les campagnes de la région lyonnaise aux XIVe et XVe siècles (1974)
- La France au XIIIe siècle (1975)
- Façons de sentir et de penser : Les fabliaux français (1979)
- Vivre et mourir en Lyonnais à la fin du Moyen Âge (1981)
- Société et cadre de vie en France, Angleterre et Bourgogne (1050-1250) (1985)
- Pour l'aise du corps : Confort et plaisirs, médications et rites XIIIe – XVe siècle (1998)
- « D'abord il dit et ordonna... » : Testaments et société en Lyonnais et Forez à la fin du Moyen Âge (2007)
- Les recueils de proverbes français (1160-1490) : Sagesse des nations et langue de bois (2016)
