= Paolo Cristoni =

Italian politician (1945–2026)

Member of the Chamber of Deputies
- In office 1987–1992

Mayor of Castelfranco Emilia
- In office 1973–1976

Personal details
- Born: 9 September 1945 Castelfranco Emilia, Italy
- Died: 31 January 2026 (aged 80) Modena, Italy
- Party: PSI
- Occupation: Business manager

Paolo Cristoni (9 September 1945 – 31 January 2026) was an Italian socialist politician, public administrator and author.

== Life and career ==
Paolo Cristoni was born in Castelfranco Emilia, Italy on 9 September 1945. In 1973, he began his career as a politician and was elected as the mayor of Castelfranco Emilia from 1973 to 1976. He became provincial secretary of the Italian Socialist Party in Modena.

In 1987, Cristoni was elected to the Chamber of Deputies, where he served from 1987 to 1992. During his time in Parliament, he was an advocate for issues affecting his constituency. He served on the committee on agriculture.

Cristoni died in Modena, Italy on 31 January 2026, at the age of 80.
