= Catherine Duprat =

French historian (1936–2026)

Catherine Duprat (1936 – 13 January 2026) was a French historian specialising in the French Revolution and philanthropy. She was a professor at the Paris I Pantheon-Sorbonne University.

== Life and career ==
In 1991, she graduated with the thesis "The time of philanthropists: the Parisian philanthropy of the Enlightenment to the July monarchy, thought and action", where she studied with Maurice Agulhon.

She worked with Michel Vovelle in the Institute of History of the French Revolution, especially during the bicentennial of the Revolution. From 1993 to 2000, she was head of the Institute and chair of the history of the French Revolution. She engaged in a panel discussion with Michel Foucault.

Duprat died on 13 January 2026, at the age of 89.

== Works ==
- Le temps des philanthropes : la philanthropie parisienne des Lumières à la Monarchie de Juillet, Paris, Éd. du CTHS, 1993. ISBN 2735502775
- Usage et pratiques de la philanthropie : pauvreté, action sociale et lien social, à Paris, au cours du premier XIXe siècle, Paris, Association pour l'étude de l'histoire de la sécurité sociale, 1996–1997. ISBN 2905882360
