= Sławomir Sadowski =

Polish politician (1948–2026)

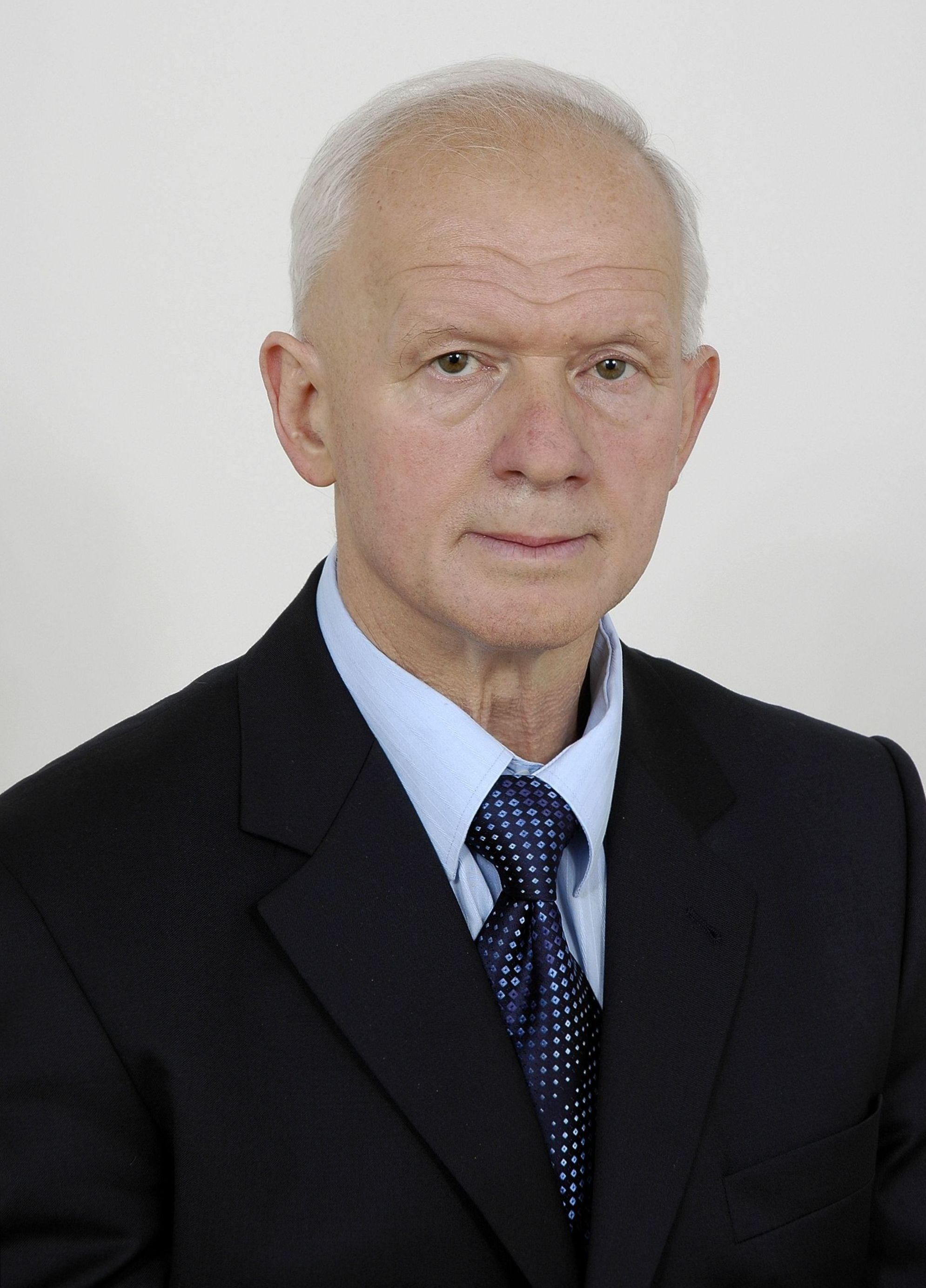
- Sadowski in 2007

Member of the Senate of Poland for Elbląg
- In office 20 October 2005 – 7 November 2011
- Preceded by: Marian Kozłowski
- Succeeded by: constituency abolished

Personal details
- Born: 19 December 1948 Pasłęk, Poland
- Died: 18 January 2026 (aged 77)
- Party: PiS
- Education: University of Gdańsk
- Occupation: Historian

Sławomir Sadowski (19 December 1948 – 18 January 2026) was a Polish politician. A member of Law and Justice, he served in the Senate from 2005 to 2011.

Sadowski died on 18 January 2026, at the age of 77.
