= Manfred Kuhmichel =

German politician (1943–2026)

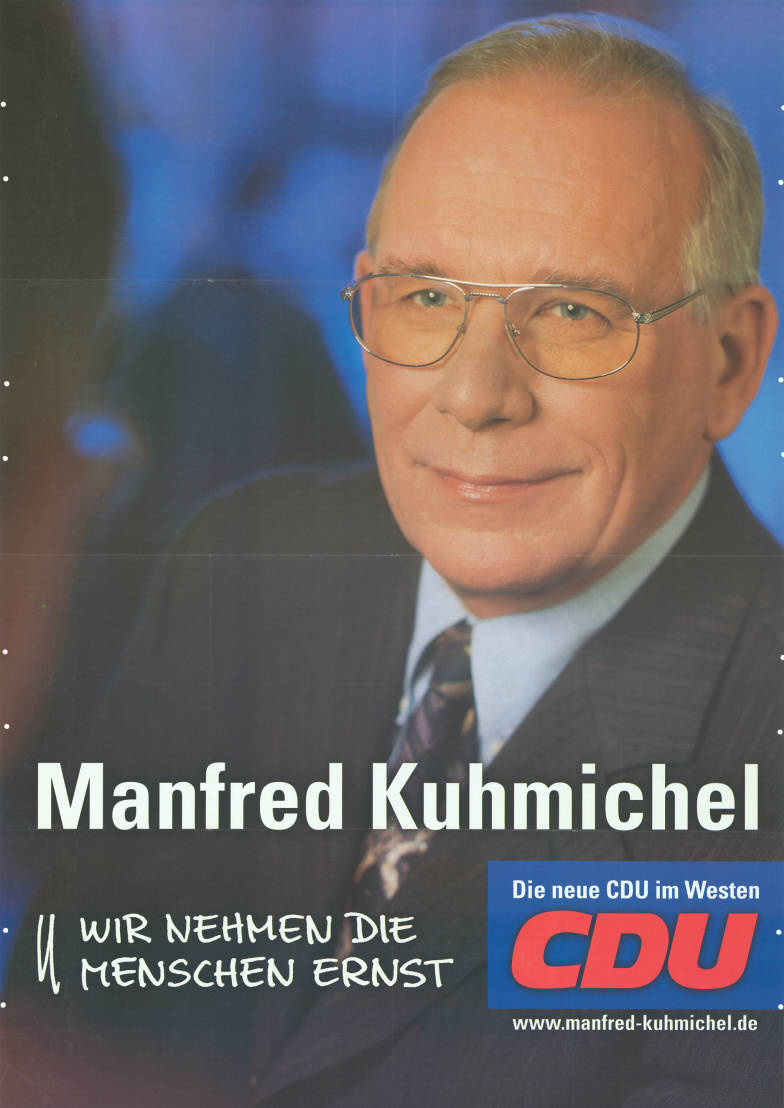
- Kuhmichel campaign poster from 2000

Member of the Landtag of North Rhine-Westphalia
- In office 31 May 1990 – 30 May 2012

Personal details
- Born: 8 April 1943 Castrop-Rauxel, Gau Westphalia-North, Germany
- Died: 9 January 2026 (aged 82)
- Party: CDU
- Occupation: Teacher

Manfred Kuhmichel (8 April 1943 – 9 January 2026) was a German politician. A member of the Christian Democratic Union, he served in the Landtag of North Rhine-Westphalia from 1990 to 2012.

Kuhmichel died on 9 January 2026, at the age of 82.
