= Nicholas Colquhoun-Denvers =

British polo official (1949–2026)

- Born: Nicholas John Arthur Colquhoun-Denvers; January 1949
- Died: 29 January 2026 (aged 76–77)
- Occupations: Polo official, businessman

Nicholas John Arthur Colquhoun-Denvers (January 1949 – 29 January 2026) was a British polo official. He was the chairman of the Ham Polo Club from 1995 to 2018, as well as the chairman of the Hurlingham Polo Association from 2009 to 2012, and the president of the Federation of International Polo from 2014 to 2018. Earlier in his life, he had played on the British Army Polo Team. Colquhoun-Denvers died on 29 January 2026.
