= Valery Fyodorovich Plotnikov =

Russian photographer (1943–2026)

Valery Plotnikov
- Валерий Плотников
- Born: 20 October 1943; Barnaul, Altai Krai, Russian SFSR, Soviet Union
- Died: 2 January 2026 (aged 82); Saint Petersburg, Russia
- Occupation: Photographer

Valery Fedorovich Plotnikov (Russian: Валерий Фёдорович Плотников; 20 October 1943 – 2 January 2026) was a Russian photographer.

Plotnikov died in Saint Petersburg on 2 January 2026, at the age of 82.

== Awards ==
- Petropol Prize (2005)
- International Baltic Star Award (2020)
