= Michael Greenhalgh =

British art historian (1943–2026)

Charles Michael Barrington Greenhalgh (25 August 1943 – 27 January 2026) was a British art historian, specialising in Classicism and the Renaissance.

== Life and career ==
Greenhalgh was born in Ilkley, West Riding of Yorkshire, England on 25 August 1943. He obtained BA in French Studies (1966) MA on Quatremere de Quincy (1966) and PhD on "Renaissance Reconstructions of the Seven Wonders of the World" from the University of Manchester (1968). He taught at the University of Leicester until 1987 when he was appointed Chair of Art History at the Australian National University.

After he retired in 2005, he continued writing and publishing until January 2026. Greenhalgh died in Canberra, Australia on 27 January 2026, at the age of 82.

== Publications ==
- The Classical Tradition in Art, London, Duckworth, 1978
- Donatello & his Sources, London, Duckworth, 1982
- The Survival of Roman Antiquities in the Middle Ages, Messrs Duckworth, London 1989
- What is Classicism?, Academy Editions, London 1990
- Marble Past, Monumental Present: Building with Antiquities in the Mediaeval Mediterranean, Leiden and Boston: Brill, 2009
- Constantinople to Córdoba: Dismantling Ancient Architecture in the East, North Africa and Islamic Spain (Leiden & Boston: Brill, 2012)
