= István Antal (politician, born 1948) =

Romanian politician (1948–2026)

Member of the Chamber of Deputies of Romania for Electoral district no. 21 Harghita
- In office 22 October 1992 – 19 December 2016

Personal details
- Born: 23 June 1948 Racoș, Romania
- Died: 21 January 2026 (aged 77)
- Party: UDMR

István Antal (23 June 1948 – 21 January 2026) was a Romanian politician. A member of the Democratic Union of Hungarians in Romania, he served in the Chamber of Deputies from 1992 to 2016.

Antal died on 21 January 2026, at the age of 77.
