= Sandra Hester =

American community activist (1957–2026)

Sandra Wheeler Hester (August 9, 1957 – January 9, 2026) was an American activist and television host from New Orleans.

Hester was born in New Orleans on August 9, 1957, to Louanna Hill.

Prior to Hurricane Katrina, she hosted the Hester Report on Public-access television in New Orleans. Her programs were generally critical of local government, particularly the Orleans Parish School Board. After the storm, she settled in Glasgow, Missouri.

Hester died of sepsis in Pineville, Louisiana, on January 9, 2026, at the age of 68.
