= Ha Sun-bong =

South Korean politician (1941–2026)

- 하순봉

Member of the National Assembly of South Korea
- In office 30 May 1992 – 29 May 2004
- In office 11 April 1981 – 12 May 1985

Personal details
- Born: 8 October 1941 Jinju, Korea, Empire of Japan
- Died: 16 January 2026 (aged 84) Jinju, South Korea
- Party: DJP; DLP; GNP
- Education: Seoul National University (BA); Konkuk University (MA, PhD); Chapman University (MA)
- Occupation: Reporter

Ha Sun-bong (Korean: 하순봉; 8 October 1941 – 16 January 2026) was a South Korean politician. A member of the Democratic Justice Party, the Democratic Liberal Party, and the Grand National Party, he served in the National Assembly from 1981 to 1985 and again from 1992 to 2004.

Ha died in Jinju on 16 January 2026, at the age of 84.
