= Bohdan Chufus =

Ukrainian actor, television presenter and singer (1950–2026)

- Богдан Чуфус
- Born: 22 January 1950; Starunya, Ivano-Frankivsk Oblast, Ukrainian SSR, Soviet Union
- Died: 2 January 2026 (aged 75)
- Occupations: Theatre and film actor; television presenter; singer

Bohdan Dmytrovych Chufus (Ukrainian: Богдан Дмитрович Чуфус; 22 January 1950 – 2 January 2026) was a Ukrainian theatre and film actor, television presenter and singer. He was honoured as a People's Artist of Ukraine in 2009.

== Life and career ==
Chufus was born in the village of Starunya, Ivano-Frankivsk Oblast, Ukrainian SSR on 22 January 1950. He worked as a doctor in his native village for two years.

He enrolled at the Kyiv Theater Institute, where he completed a degree with honors in 1975. By referral, he got a job at the Sevastopol Russian Drama Theater later that year. From 1977 to 2005, he worked at the Odessa Drama Theater, where he was later awarded the title of Honored Artist of Ukraine in 1994.

From 2005, he worked at Odessa Television. For this civic publicity Bohdan was awarded the title of People's Artist of Ukraine in 2009.

On stage, Chufus played hundreds of character roles, including a female one. He also starred in a number of films.

Chufus died on 2 January 2026, at the age of 75.

== Titles ==
- People's Artist of Ukraine (25 December 2009) – for significant personal contribution to the socio-economic and cultural development of Ukraine, high professionalism and many years of conscientious work
- Honored Artist of Ukraine (15 June 1994) – for significant personal contribution to the development of theatrical art and musical culture, high performing skills

== Sources ==
- “Paths of Memory”. Creative Meeting with Bohdan Chufus
