= Graham Knight (Australian footballer) =

Australian rules footballer (1931–2026)

Personal information
- Full name: Graham Ivo Knight
- Born: 3 May 1931
- Died: 4 January 2026 (aged 94)
- Original team: Fitzroy District
- Height: 178 cm (5 ft 10 in)
- Weight: 76 kg (168 lb)

Playing career
Years	Club	Games (Goals)
1953–60	Fitzroy	55 (41)

Graham Ivo Knight (3 May 1931 – 4 January 2026) was an Australian rules footballer who played with Fitzroy in the Victorian Football League (VFL). He died on 4 January 2026, at the age of 94.
