= Laslo Pavlik =

Serbian road racing cyclist (1946–2026)

- Pavlik in 1965

Personal information
- Born: 1946 Yugoslavia
- Died: 13 January 2026 (aged 79–80)

Cycling career
- Sport: Cycling
- Discipline: Road racing
- Role: Rider

Laslo Pavlik (1946 – 13 January 2026) was a Serbian road racing cyclist. He competed in the Peace Race in 1964, 1965 and 1967, and won the Tour of Bulgaria in 1969.

Pavlik died on 13 January 2026.
