= Deaths in August 2026 =

The following is a list of notable deaths in August 2026.

Entries for each day are listed alphabetically by surname. A typical entry lists information in the following sequence:

- Name, age, country of citizenship at birth, subsequent country of citizenship (if applicable), reason for notability, cause of death (if known), and reference.

== August 2026 ==
=== 1 ===
- Alexeis Argilagos, 51, Cuban Olympic volleyball player (2000), brain tumour.
- Line Bareiro, 75, Paraguayan political scientist.
- Vivienne Binns, 85, Australian artist.
- Malik Muhammad Iqbal Channar, 76, Pakistani politician, MNA (since 2024), complications from a brain haemorrhage.
- Beitia, 89, Spanish footballer (Barakaldo, Athletic, Barcelona).
- Natalia Dontcheva, 56, Bulgarian actress (Lady J, Sashinka, A Man and His Dog).
- Jonathan Leo Fairbanks, 93, American art curator.
- Ulla Flegel, 86, Austrian Olympic high jumper (1964).
- Nariman Hasanzade, 95, Azerbaijani poet.
- Fred Hoaglin, 82, American football player (Cleveland Browns) and coach (New York Giants, New England Patriots).
- Rom Kostřica, 77, Czech otorhinolaryngologist and politician, deputy (2010–2013, 2013–2017).
- Grzegorz Lipowski, 90, Polish politician, voivode of Częstochowa (1980–1990), senator (1997–2005).
- Marcel J. Mélançon, 88, Canadian bioethicist and academic.
- Francisco Mora, 74, Cuban Olympic rower (1976, 1980).
- Marijke Moser, 79, Dutch-born Swiss Olympic runner (1972).
- Vincent Pastore, 80, American actor (The Sopranos, Gotti, Shark Tale).
- Kath Pettingill, 91, Australian gangster and brothel owner (Pettingill family), complications from dementia.
- Thottam Rajasekharan, 95, Indian writer.
- Monty Roberts, 91, American horse trainer.
- Philip Ruppe, 99, American politician, member of the U.S. House of Representatives (1967–1979).
- Lou Sekora, 94, Canadian politician, MP (1998–2000) and mayor of Coquitlam (1983–1997).
- Ryotaro Shimizu, 37, Japanese actor (Full Swing, Amachan, Gokusen: The Movie), suicide.

=== 2 ===
- Paul Bradshaw, 72, English footballer (Burnley, Sheffield Wednesday).
- Fernando d'Alessio, 82, Peruvian politician, minister of health (2017–2018), minister of education (2020).
- Nicholas Davey, 75, British philosopher.
- David Z, 78, American record producer ("She Drives Me Crazy", "Looking for a New Love") and musician (Lipps Inc.), complications from an infection.
- Margot Eppinger, 72, German Olympic pentathlete (1972, 1976).
- Sir Anthony Evans, 92, British judge, lord justice of appeal (1992–2000).
- Michael Fingleton, 88, Irish banker, CEO of the Irish Nationwide Building Society (1971–2009), complications from a stroke.
- Bill Goichberg, 83, American Hall of Fame chess player.
- Kay Granger, 83, American politician, mayor of Fort Worth (1991–1995) and member of the U.S. House of Representatives (1997–2025), complications from Alzheimer's disease.
- Franz Hasiba, 93, Austrian politician, mayor of Graz (1983–1985), deputy governor of Styria (1991–1993), member and president of the Landtag of Styria (1993–2000).
- Monika Helfer, 78, Austrian writer, fall.
- Janet Howell, 82, American politician, member of the Virginia Senate (1992–2024).
- Romeo Jalosjos Sr., 85, Filipino politician and convicted child rapist, member of the House of Representatives (1995–2002).
- Joseph Katema, 64, Zambian politician, MP (2006–2016).
- Dusty LaValley, 45, Canadian Hall of Fame bareback rider, complications from amyotrophic lateral sclerosis.
- Rod Liddle, 66, British journalist (Today, The Spectator) and broadcaster.
- Ed McCabe, 87, American advertising executive and creative director.
- Sepp Puschnig, 79, Austrian Olympic ice hockey player (1964, 1968, 1976).
- Anbar Said, 67, Kuwaiti footballer (Al-Arabi SC, Ahli Sidab Club), traffic collision.
- Farrokh Saidi, 96, Iranian surgeon.
- Rick Sapienza, 90, American football player (New York Titans).
- Manmohan Singh Liberhan, 87, Indian jurist, chairman of the Liberhan Commission (1992–2009).
- Agostino Superbo, 86, Italian Roman Catholic prelate, bishop of Sessa Aurunca (1991–1994) and Altamura-Gravina-Acquaviva delle Fonti (1994–1997), archbishop of Potenza–Muro Lucano–Marsico Nuovo (2001–2015).
- Alberto Tedesco, 77, Italian politician, senator (2009–2013).
- Tsurumaru Tsuyoshi, 31, Japanese Thoroughbred racehorse.
- Valeriy Tursunov, 71, Tajikistani football player (CSKA Pamir, Austria Klagenfurt) and manager (CSKA Pamir).
- Ioannis Varvitsiotis, 93, Greek politician, minister of defence (1989–1993), MEP (2004–2009), and twice MP.
- John Wannenburgh, Manx politician, MHK (since 2021).

=== 3 ===
- Paula Alí, 88, Cuban actress (Letters from the Park, The Elephant and the Bicycle, The Waiting List).
- Mateusz Bąk, 43, Polish footballer (Lechia Gdańsk).
- Ryszard Bartosz, 72, Polish politician, MP (1989–1993).
- Grace Chang, 93, Hong Kong actress (Soldier of Fortune, The Wild, Wild Rose).
- Robin Cowling, 82, English rugby union player (Gloucester, Leicester Tigers, national team).
- Jimmy Cricket, 80, Northern Irish comedian and television host (And There's More).
- Jon Cypher, 94, American actor (Hill Street Blues, Major Dad, Masters of the Universe).
- Dennis Drainville, 72, Canadian bishop and politician.
- Jean-Paul Dréau, 73, French composer and songwriter.
- Júlio Duarte Langa, 98, Mozambican Roman Catholic cardinal, bishop of Xai-Xai (1976–2004).
- Alfonso Fanjul Jr., 89, Cuban-born American sugar refining and real estate executive (Domino Foods).
- Peter Gill, 86, Welsh director, playwright and actor (The York Realist, Versailles).
- Mickey Guillory, 86, American politician, member of the Louisiana House of Representatives (2003–2016).
- Paras Chandra Jain, 76, Indian politician, Madhya Pradesh MLA (2003–2023).
- Ray Jarvis, 77, American football player (Atlanta Falcons, Detroit Lions, New England Patriots).
- Sir Anthony Kenny, 95, British philosopher (A New History of Western Philosophy).
- Alain Le Goff, 83, French storyteller.
- Vic Matthews, 92, British Olympic hurdler (1960).
- Robin Middleton, 94, British architectural historian.
- Allan Nascimento, 34, Brazilian mixed martial artist (UFC), heart attack.
- Hatsuo Royama, 78, Japanese karate practitioner.
- Uladzimir Shymau, 77, Belarusian politician, minister of economy (1996–2002).
- Herb Snyder, 72, American politician, member of the West Virginia Senate (1997–2005, 2009–2017).
- Iván Szelényi, 88, Hungarian-born American sociologist.
- Ruslan Taramov, 61, Russian Olympic boxer (1988).
- André Vallerand, 86, Canadian politician, Quebec MNA (1985–1994).
- Pablo Vázquez Vega, 60, Spanish politician, deputy (2023–2024).

=== 4 ===
- Robby Albarado, 52, American jockey, complications from heart surgery.
- Daniele Amati, 94, Italian theoretical physicist.
- Abelino Manuel Apeleo, 75, Chilean Anglican cleric, bishop of Araucania.
- Bernhard Billeter, 90, Swiss musician and musicologist.
- Bruno Campanella, 83, Italian conductor (Teatro Regio (Turin)).
- Michael Conaghan, 81, Irish politician, TD (2011–2016) and lord mayor of Dublin (2004–2005).
- John Damore, 92, American football player (Chicago Bears, Mohawk Valley Falcons).
- Nils Eklund, 99, Swedish actor (Peter-No-Tail, Doctor Glas, Amorosa).
- Dory Funk Jr., 85, American Hall of Fame professional wrestler (NWA, AJPW).
- David George Gordon, 76, American naturalist and non-fiction writer.
- Pepe Habichuela, 81, Spanish flamenco guitarist.
- Klaus Hänsch, 87, German politician, member (1979–2009) and president (1994–1997) of the European Parliament.
- Jutta Hertlein, 86, German politician, member of the House of Representatives of Berlin (1995–1999, 2001–2006).
- Alfonso Lizarazo, 85, Colombian television host (Sábados Felices) and politician, senator (1998–2002).
- Georgios Marsellos, 89, Greek Olympic hurdler (1960, 1964).
- Wayne Martin, 73, New Zealand cricketer (Central Districts).
- Andrzej Morozowski, 69, Polish journalist (Radio ZET, TVN 24).
- Tristam Nada, 68, French singer and painter.
- Victor Niederhoffer, 82, American investor and writer.
- Liam O'Neill, 70, Irish sports administrator, president of the GAA (2012–2015).
- Joseph C. Paradi, 85, Hungarian-born Canadian academic.
- D. Y. Patil, 90, Indian politician, governor of Tripura (2009–2013), Bihar (2013–2014), and West Bengal (2014).
- Pradeep Rawat, 74, Indian actor (Mahabharat, Sye, Naayak), blood cancer.
- Lloyd Robertson, 92, Canadian journalist and broadcaster (CBC News, CTV News).
- James G. Roche, 86, American politician, secretary of the Air Force (2001–2005), vascular disease.
- Jarosław Stolicki, 63–64, Polish historian and academic.
- Jim Toman, 64, American baseball player (NC State Wolfpack) and coach (Liberty Flames, Middle Tennessee Blue Raiders), brain cancer.
- Terry Trotter, 85, American jazz pianist and composer (Everybody Loves Raymond).

=== 5 ===
- Ardak Amirkulov, 70, Kazakh film director (The Fall of Otrar).
- Oladele Awobuluyi, 89, Nigerian linguist and academic.
- Daniel Bernard, 80, French retail executive, chairman of Carrefour (1992–2005) and Kingfisher plc (2009–2017).
- Vincent Browne, 78, Irish sculptor.
- Shimon Charnuha, 78, Israeli footballer (Maccabi Netanya, Beitar Jerusalem, national team).
- Zdzisław Czarnobilski, 91, Polish politician, MP (1989–1991), senator (1991–1993).
- Bruno Battisti D'Amario, 88, Italian classical guitarist and composer.
- Didier Decoin, 81, French writer and screenwriter (I as in Icarus, The Veiled Man, Out of Life).
- Maria-Luise Egerer, 80, Austrian politician, member of the Landtag of Lower Austria (1993–2003).
- Bilgesu Erenus, 82, Turkish playwright, screenwriter and political activist.
- Rick Galbos, 75, American football player (Calgary Stampeders, Montreal Alouettes).
- William Ilgenfritz, 79, American Anglican cleric, bishop of All Saints (2009–2021).
- Tim Jeal, 81, British biographer and novelist.
- Peter Lai, 76, Hong Kong lyricist and actor (Old Time Buddy, Come Home Love: Lo and Behold), complications from a stroke.
- Jean Lodge, 99, British actress (Death of an Angel, Brandy for the Parson, Glad Tidings).
- John Langeloth Loeb Jr., 96, American diplomat, ambassador to Denmark (1981–1983).
- Bernt H. Lund, 101, Norwegian civil servant, politician and diplomat.
- Wilhelmina Lust, 94, Dutch Olympic athlete (1952).
- Cozell McQueen, 64, American basketball player (NC State Wolfpack, Detroit Pistons), brain cancer.
- Matt McQuillan, 45, Canadian golfer (PGA Tour).
- Zoltán Melis, 78, Hungarian rower, Olympic silver medalist (1968).
- Ken Mitchell, 85, Canadian poet, novelist and playwright.
- Tedde Moore, 79, Canadian actress (A Christmas Story, Murder by Decree, Rolie Polie Olie).
- Jack Mortland, 91, American Olympic racewalker (1964).
- David Naleski, 74, American trade unionist, complications from amyotrophic lateral sclerosis.
- Laurence E. Nyquist, 87, American planetary scientist.
- Hugh O'Flaherty, 88, Irish barrister, judge of the supreme court (1990–1999).
- David Owori, 27, Ugandan footballer (SC Villa, national team), beaten.
- Tomás Parra, 88–89, Mexican sculptor.
- Sammy Price, 82, American football player (Miami Dolphins).
- Ray Reinhardt, 96, American actor (The Hunt for Red October, My Life, Jexi).
- Alejandro Royo-Villanova, 85, Spanish politician, senator (1977–1982), deputy (1982–1986).
- Manfred Rühl, 92, German communication scientist.
- Uma Shankar Singh, 55, Indian politician, Uttar Pradesh MLA (since 2012), cancer.
- Eugene Stockton, 91, Australian priest.
- Wally Sykes, 83, British Olympic sports shooter (1984).
- Sydney Towle, 26, American social media influencer, cholangiocarcinoma.
- Terry Buffalo Ware, 76, American guitarist and composer, lung cancer.
- Oleksii Yukov, 40, Ukrainian war archaeologist, killed by landmine.
- Rustem Zhantiev, 88, Russian scientist.

=== 6 ===
- Flo Anthony, 74, American gossip columnist (National Examiner).
- Dimbo Atiya, 52, Nigerian television director (Sons of the Caliphate, Halita, Still Falling) and producer, heart attack.
- Kenneth Baker, 96, American Catholic priest.
- Bernard Barton, 74–75, Irish barrister, judge of the High Court (2014–2021).
- Christian Bernard, 76, French art curator.
- Ann Bogan, 85, American singer (The Marvelettes).
- Whitney Chadwick, 83, American art historian.
- Ben Clarke, 98, American politician, member of the Colorado House of Representatives (1995–2001).
- Catherine Dasté, 96, French stage actress and director.
- Harry C. Dorn, 82, American chemist.
- Peter Faber, 82, German-born Dutch actor (A Bridge Too Far, Soldier of Orange, Max Havelaar), heart disease.
- Kapeliele Faupala, 86, French Wallisian traditional ruler, king of Uvea (2008–2014).
- Carlos Garfias Merlos, 75, Mexican Roman Catholic prelate, bishop of Netzahualcóyotl (2003–2010), archbishop of Acapulco (2010–2016) and Morelia (2016–2026).
- Geraldão, 77, Brazilian footballer (Corinthians, Internacional, Botafogo-SP).
- Hermann Gericke, 94, Swiss Olympic swimmer (1952).
- Francesco Guccini, 86, Italian singer-songwriter ("Auschwitz").
- Richard Herman, 88, American politician, member of the New Hampshire House of Representatives (1998–2000).
- Timothy Hornsby, 85, British civil servant, complications from pneumonia.
- Matthew Jukes, 58, British wine writer.
- Kuulo Kalamees, 92, Estonian mycologist.
- Peter Katsis, 69, American music manager (Backstreet Boys, Korn, Jane's Addiction), congestive heart failure.
- Austin Liato, 60, Zambian politician, MNA (2002–2011) and minister of labour (2008–2011).
- Giuseppe Marchioro, 90, Italian football manager (Como, Milan, Genoa).
- Manuel Martín Piñera, 95, Spanish racing cyclist (Kas–Boxing, Karpy).
- Arthur Price, 80, British motorcycle speedway rider (King's Lynn Stars, Cradley Heathens, England national team).
- Benjamin Rader, 90, American historian and writer.
- Rashid al-Rajih, 81, Saudi politician, member of the Consultative Assembly (1995–2005).
- Martha Rivers Ingram, 90, American manufacturing industry executive, CEO of Ingram Industries (1995–1999).
- Tom Rockmore, 84, American philosopher.
- Tony Scott, 54, Surinamese-born Dutch rapper and musician, complications from multiple sclerosis.
- Shimon Shelah, 94, Israeli basketball player and coach (Hapoel Tel Aviv, national team).
- Daniel Sivan, 76, Moroccan-born Israeli linguist.
- Marjolein Sligte, 71, Dutch actress (De Boezemvriend, A Month Later, Honneponnetje).

=== 7 ===
- Bill Armstrong, 97, Australian music producer.
- Patricia Baird, 88, British-born Canadian medical geneticist, assisted suicide.
- Carola von Braun, 83, German politician and women's rights activist, member of the Bundestag (1980–1983), Senate of West Berlin (1984–1990), and the Berlin House of Representatives (1990–1994).
- Mohamed Eusoff Chin, 90, Malaysian jurist, chief justice (1994–2000).
- Władysława Anna Daniel, Polish pharmacologist.
- Wimal Dissanayake, 86, Sri Lankan writer, literary critic and scholar.
- Dominique Frot, 68, French actress (Enigma, Peut-être, Titane).
- Andrzej Gąsiorowski, 75, Polish political scientist and academic.
- Hà Đình Đức, 86, Vietnamese biologist (Hoan Kiem turtle).
- Chandler David Hendry, 27, American social media personality, traffic collision.
- Violet Hensley, 109, American luthier and fiddle player.
- Immortal Verse, 18, Irish Thoroughbred racehorse.
- Charles Hollis Jones, 81, American furniture designer.
- Keiko Kishi, 93, Japanese actress (The Makioka Sisters, Snow Country, The Rendezvous).
- Aaron Marsh, 81, American football player (Boston Patriots).
- Eugene McDaniel, 94, American Navy captain, heart failure.
- Jim Miller, 107, Australian footballer (Western Bulldogs).
- Matsushige Ono, 90, Japanese politician, MP (1996–2009), deputy chief cabinet secretary (2007–2008), complications from pneumonia.
- Bah Oumarou Sanda, 86, Cameroonian diplomat and magistrate.
- Cathy Pearsall-Stipek, 94, American politician, member of the Washington House of Representatives (1977–1979).
- Balendu Prakash, 67, Indian ayurveda practitioner.
- Chikara Sakaguchi, 92, Japanese politician, minister of health, labour and welfare (2001–2004) and MP (1972–2012).
- Lucienne Stassaert, 90, Belgian poet and painter.
- Alphonse Vandenrydt, 99, Belgian Olympic distance runner (1952).

=== 8 ===
- Big Buck's, 23, French Thoroughbred racehorse. (death announced on this date)
- C. J. Binks, 94, Australian writer and educator.
- Randy Burns, 78, American folk singer, songwriter and guitarist.
- Roberto Costanzo, 96, Italian politician, MEP (1979–1989).
- John Crowley, 83, American writer (Little, Big, Ægypt, Ka – Dar Oakley in the Ruin of Ymr), complications from dementia.
- Nancy Halliday Ely-Raphel, 89, American diplomat, ambassador to Slovakia (1998–2001).
- La Norma Fox, 100, Danish-born American aerialist.
- Girvin, 12, American Thoroughbred racehorse.
- Robin Hill, 94, Australian artist and writer.
- Bob Jones, 93, American Episcopal prelate, bishop of Wyoming (1977–1996).
- Diana La Cazadora, 48, Mexican professional wrestler (CMLL, LLF), lung infection.
- André Lévy-Lang, 88, French private banker (Compagnie Bancaire, BNP Paribas).
- Dominique Libault, 64, French civil servant, councillor of state (since 2012).
- Oihane Mateos, 45, Spanish journalist, cancer.
- Jorge Messi, 68, Argentine businessman and sports agent (Lionel Messi).
- Adolf Niggemeier, 95, German politician, member of the Volkskammer (1967–1990).
- Hiroshi Okuda, 93, Japanese automotive executive, president (1995–1999) and chairman (1999–2006) of Toyota.
- Phil Parkes, 79, English footballer (Wolverhampton Wanderers, Vancouver Whitecaps, Chicago Sting).
- Xaysomphone Phomvihane, 69, Laotian politician, minister of finance (1995–1998) and president of the National Assembly (since 2021), inflammatory vascular disease.
- Rachel Naomi Remen, 88, American pediatrician and author.
- John Rousmaniere, 82, American author and sailor.
- Joaquim Sarmento, 74, Portuguese politician, deputy (1995–2002).
- Ivo Šlaus, 94, Croatian physicist.
- Oded Stark, 82, Polish economist.
- Tania Verstak, 85, Australian model and beauty queen.

=== 9 ===
- Reidun Andreassen, 90, Norwegian politician, MP (1985–1989).
- Dipak Bahadur K.C., 85, Nepali politician, MP (2008–2013).
- Reggie Bannister, 80, American actor (Phantasm, Bubba Ho-Tep, Wishmaster), complications from Lewy body dementia and Parkinson's disease.
- Livio Berruti, 87, Italian sprinter, Olympic champion (1960).
- Maurice Buttin, 97, French lawyer and writer.
- Lynn Council, 93, American lynching survivor.
- Brian Dyson, 90, American businessman, CEO of Coca-Cola Enterprises (1986–1991), complications from pneumonia.
- Giancarlo Ferretti, 85, Italian road racing cyclist.
- Martin Fofié Kouakou, 57–58, Ivorian military officer.
- Edward B. Fort, 95, American academic administrator, chancellor of North Carolina A&T State University (1981–1999).
- Douglas Franklin, 76, Brazilian footballer (Santos, Bahia), bowel cancer.
- Dennis Grey, 79, American basketball player (Los Angeles Stars, New York Mets).
- Cheryl Hall, 76, English actress (Doctor Who, EastEnders, The Bill).
- Ben Jones, 84, American actor (The Dukes of Hazzard, Primary Colors) and politician, member of the U.S. House of Representatives (1989–1993), heart attack.
- Ilya Kuleshin, 25, Russian footballer (Khimik-Arsenal, Arsenal Tula, Avangard Kursk), cancer.
- Lee Yong-taek, 95, South Korean politician, MP (1981–1988).
- John F. Link, 91, American film editor (Commando, Predator, Die Hard).
- Diab Al-Louh, 67, Palestinian diplomat and politician, ambassador to Egypt (since 2017).
- David H. Lund, 86, American philosopher.
- Garreth Lynch, 83, American politician, member of the Massachusetts House of Representatives (1973–1978).
- Don Nelson, 86, American basketball player (Boston Celtics) and Hall of Fame coach (Golden State Warriors, Dallas Mavericks), five-time NBA champion, complications from a stroke.
- Romain Noble, 46, French wheelchair fencer, Paralympic champion (2016).
- Ana Noovao, 58, New Zealand netball player (national team) and coach.
- Wacław Orłowski, 81, Polish Olympic wrestler (1968).
- Eduardo Parraguez, 90, Chilean politician, mayor of Pichilemu (1975–1979).
- Charlotte Puiseux, 39, French disability rights activist, complications from a stroke.
- Owen Williams, 95, South African tennis player.
- Piston van Wyk, 82, South African rugby union player (Northern Transvaal, Sharks, national team).

=== 10 ===
- Stan Adelstein, 94, American politician, member of the South Dakota House of Representatives (2001–2005) and Senate (2005–2007, 2009–2013).
- Borger Breeveld, 82, Surinamese actor (Wan Pipel).
- Frank Campo, 99, American composer.
- Timothy M. Carney, 82, American diplomat, ambassador to Sudan (1995–1997) and Haiti (1998–1999), esophageal cancer.
- Alejandro Castellanos, 46, Honduran Olympic swimmer (2000), heart attack.
- Kermit Davis Sr., 91, American college basketball coach (Mississippi State Bulldogs).
- Vincent Dieutre, 65, French film director and screenwriter (Beirut Hotel).
- Riemke Ensing, 87, Dutch-born New Zealand poet.
- Armando Umberto Gianni, 86, Italian Roman Catholic prelate, bishop of Bouar (1978–2017).
- Jackie, c. 14, American bald eagle, avian influenza.
- Mzikayifane Khumalo, 54, South African politician, Gauteng MPL (since 2019).
- Miguel Mancera, 93, Mexican economist, director of the Bank of Mexico (1982–1998).
- Donald Mathieson, 95, Australian cricketer (Victoria).
- James McHugh, 62, Irish Gaelic footballer (Donegal), traffic collision.
- Juan Muhlethaler, 71, Uruguayan footballer (Montevideo Wanderers, Técnico Universitario, national team).
- Vladimír Páral, 94, Czech writer (Mladý muž a bílá velryba: Malý chemický epos).
- Jean Paton, 97, British botanist and bryologist.
- Slavko Pregl, 80, Slovenian writer (Odprava zelenega zmaja).
- Prince Mongo, 89, American novelty politician, fall.
- Reed E. Pyeritz, 78, American medical geneticist, interstitial lung disease.
- Jean-Paul Rostagni, 78, French footballer (AS Monaco, Paris Saint-Germain, national team).
- Paul Snyder, 94, American sports administrator, owner of the Buffalo Braves (1970–1977).
- Song Du-ho, 97, South Korean politician, MP (1988–1996).
- Pavel Syutkin, 104, Russian army officer.
- Natalia Trubnikova, 71, Russian ballerina and actress (31 June, The Twelve Chairs, Formula of Love).
- Thongchai Yenprasert, 71, Thai politician, president of the Nonthaburi Provincial Administrative Organization (since 2004), shot.
- Zhu Senlin, 95, Chinese politician, governor of Guangdong (1991–1996) and mayor of Guangzhou (1985–1988).

=== 11 ===
- Steve Barwick, 65, Welsh cricketer (Glamorgan, Wales Minor Counties).
- Len Brown, 84, American comic book writer (T.H.U.N.D.E.R. Agents), creator of Mars Attacks.
- Carol Cass, 83, American-born Canadian medical researcher.
- Ward Churchill, 78, American political activist (Little Eichmanns) and writer (On the Justice of Roosting Chickens), stroke.
- Paul Cranis, 91, American tennis player.
- Kurt Danziger, 100, German-born Canadian academic.
- Tyler Duckworth, 44, American reality television contestant (The Real World: Key West, The Challenge).
- Harold P. Freeman, 93, American physician and patients' rights advocate.
- Ingeborg Friebe, 95, German politician, member (1975–1995) and president (1990–1995) of the Landtag of North Rhine-Westphalia.
- Jill Gomez, 83, Trinidadian-British soprano, complications from dementia.
- Mikhail Gulko, 95, Ukrainian-born American chanson singer-songwriter.
- Guo Lanying, 96, Chinese operatic soprano ("My Motherland").
- John Irvin, 86, English filmmaker (The Dogs of War, Hamburger Hill, Tinker Tailor Soldier Spy), cancer.
- Russell Jack, 91, Australian museum founder (Golden Dragon Museum).
- Maureen Jones, 99, Australian classical pianist.
- Kriang Kalptinan, 73, Thai politician, MP (1995–2006, 2023–2025).
- Christy Knowings, 46, American actress and comedian (All That), cardiac arrest.
- Yehuda Lapidot, 97, Israeli historian and biochemist.
- Kosti Manibe Ngai, 78, South Sudanese politician.
- Fiorenza Marchegiani, 73, Italian actress (I'm Starting from Three, Scusa se è poco, D'Annunzio).
- Sheila Mathews, 99, English actress, singer and dancer.
- Alaksandar Milinkievič, 79, Belarusian political dissident, complications from surgery.
- Sami Mohammad, 82, Kuwaiti sculptor and artist.
- Silvia Monti, 80, Italian actress (The Brain, A Lizard in a Woman's Skin, The Sicilian Connection).
- Barton Myers, 91, American architect (Innis College, Toronto, Citadel Theatre, Seagram Museum).
- Darryl Neighbour, 78, Canadian wheelchair curler, Paralympic champion (2010), traffic collision.
- M. P. Parameswaran, 91, Indian nuclear engineer.
- Phan Thanh Hùng, 66, Vietnamese football player (Quảng Nam-Đà Nẵng, national team) and manager (national team), laryngeal cancer.
- Vicente Quirarte, 72, Mexican writer.
- Krishneswara Rao, 71, Indian actor (Gopi Gopika Godavari, Chandamama Kathalu, Agent Sai Srinivasa Athreya) and writer.
- Alexander Romanovich, 73, Russian politician, MP (2011–2016).
- Sensational, 51, Guyanese-American rapper. (death announced on this date)
- Gurjeet Singh Toot, 45, Indian Punjabi kabaddi player, complications from drug addiction.
- Tomasz Szarota, 86, Polish historian and publicist.
- Lúcia Viveiros, 91, Brazilian politician, deputy (1979–1987).
- Vyacheslav Vorobyov, 63, Russian footballer (Kuban, Tighina, KAMAZ).

=== 12 ===
- Ahn Pan-seok, 64, South Korean television director (Behind the White Tower, Secret Affair, Heard It Through the Grapevine), brain hemorrhage.
- Gianpaolo Bellini, 91, Italian physicist.
- Gregor Benko, 82, American music historian (International Piano Archives).
- Arthur Bodson, 94, Belgian philologist and academic, rector of the University of Liège (1985–1997).
- David Charles, 78, British philosopher.
- Chen Ying-git, 72, Taiwanese singer.
- Giles Chichester, 80, British politician, MEP (1999–2014).
- Josef Deimer, 90, German politician, member of the Landtag of Bavaria (1966–1970), member of the Bavarian Senate (1982–1999).
- Piet du Plessis, 79, South African rugby union player (Northern Transvaal, Western Province, national team), complications from Alzheimer's disease and dementia.
- Freddy Makafui Dunyah, 64–65, Togolese environmental activist.
- Olivier Echaudemaison, 84, French makeup artist.
- Juan Manuel Escobar, 76, American politician, member of the Texas House of Representatives (2003–2009).
- Pádraig Horan, 76, Irish hurler and Gaelic footballer (St Rynagh's, Offaly).
- Iraj, 93, Iranian classical music singer.
- Wallace Kirsop, 92, Australian scholar.
- R. J. Kizer, 73, American film director (Hell Comes to Frogtown, Godzilla 1985) and editor (Galaxy of Terror), glioblastoma.
- Miroslav Koníček, 90, Czech rower, Olympic bronze medalist (1960, 1964). (death announced on this date)
- Kai Krüger, 86, Norwegian jurist and academic.
- Darina Laščiaková, 94, Slovak folk singer and ethnographer.
- Olivier Lebas, 62, French naval officer (Opération Chammal), fall.
- Víctor Limba, 78, Argentine Olympic cyclist (1972).
- Takamitsu Ota, 56, Japanese footballer (Shimizu S-Pulse, Consadole Sapporo, Jatco TT).
- Bernard Pottier, 101, French linguist and academic.
- Adolf Prokop, 87, German football referee.
- Tulio Ramírez Padilla, 66, Venezuelan Roman Catholic prelate, auxiliary bishop of Caracas (2012–2020) and bishop of Guarenas (since 2020).
- Antal Rizmayer, 86, Hungarian Olympic wrestler (1960, 1964).
- Chelo Rodríguez, 84, Spanish-born Venezuelan actress and model, cancer.
- Pramuan Rujanaseri, 87, Thai politician, director-general of the Department of Provincial Administration (1997–1999), MP (2001–2005).
- Brian Smith, 59, Australian rugby union (national team, Ireland national team) and league player (Balmain Tigers), cancer.
- Cordula Trantow, 83, German actress and director (Die Brücke, Hitler, The Castle).
- Jacques Wallage, 79, Dutch politician, state secretary for education (1989–1993), social affairs (1993–1994) and mayor of Groningen (1998–2009).
- Wang Xiji, 105, Chinese aerospace engineer, member of the Chinese Academy of Sciences.
- Nancy Wyman, 80, American politician, lieutenant governor of Connecticut (2011–2019), Connecticut state comptroller (1995–2011) and member of the Connecticut House of Representatives (1987–1995).
- Zhu Rongji, 97, Chinese economist and politician, premier (1998–2003), vice premier (1993–1998) and mayor of Shanghai (1988–1991).

=== 13 ===
- Abderrahmane Alane, 55, Algerian footballer (MC Alger, JS Kabylie, national team).
- Ruby Andrews, 79, American soul singer.
- Elżbieta Barys, 79, Polish politician, MP (1997–2001).
- Agim Bubeqi, 63, Albanian footballer (Flamurtari Vlorë, national team). (death announced on this date)
- Prichard Colón, 33, Puerto Rican boxer, complications from a brain hemorrhage.
- Jack Crabtree, 87, English painter and teacher.
- Vito Gruosso, 78, Italian politician, senator (1994–2006).
- Wolfgang Haber, 100, German biologist and landscape ecologist (Technical University of Munich).
- Horst Jaunich, 96, German politician, MP (1972–1994).
- Janez Kajzer, 88, Slovenian writer.
- Bill Kerby, 88, American screenwriter (The Rose, Hooper, Firepower).
- James T. Laney, 98, American diplomat and academic administrator, ambassador to South Korea (1993–1996) and president of Emory University (1977–1993).
- Helmut Lethen, 87, German Germanist and cultural scholar.
- Peter Maher, 79, Canadian sportscaster (Calgary Flames).
- Dumitru Marcu, 76, Romanian football player (Universitatea Craiova, Gloria Buzău, national team) and manager.
- Carlos Domingos Massoni, 87, Brazilian basketball player, Olympic bronze medallist (1960, 1964).
- Roy Moxham, 86, British writer.
- Brendan Myers, 52, Canadian philosopher and author, heart attack.
- Oren Nahari, 70, Israeli journalist and presenter (Channel 1), complications from amyotrophic lateral sclerosis.
- Jim Powers, 89, Canadian ice hockey player (Seattle Totems, Vancouver Canucks).
- Dick Proctor, 85, Canadian politician and political activist, MP (1997–2004).
- Mohammad Rafiqul Islam, 74, Bangladeshi military officer, chief of air force staff (2001–2002).
- Mark Rydell, 97, American film director (On Golden Pond, The Rose, The River).
- Sumit Sarkar, 87, Indian historian.
- Yukio Shimomura, 94, Japanese football player (Toyo Industries, national team) and manager (national team).
- Peter Snape, Baron Snape, 84, British politician, MP (1974–2001) and member of the House of Lords (since 2004), cancer.
- Anton Stankov, 60, Bulgarian politician, minister of justice (2001–2005).
- Forest Tennant, 85, American physician, writer and politician, mayor of West Covina, California (1980–1988), complications from kidney disease.
- Jeremy Williams, 42, American convicted child rapist and killer (murder of Kamarie Holland), execution by lethal injection.
- Johnny Young, 79, Dutch-born Australian singer, songwriter ("The Real Thing", "The Star") and television producer (Young Talent Time), pancreatic cancer.

=== 14 ===
- Stanisław Adamiak, 93, Polish politician, MP (1976–1985).
- Jason Arday, 41, British academic and writer (Great and Unfortunate Things: A Memoir).
- Skip Bertman, 88, American baseball player (Miami Hurricanes) and coach (LSU Tigers).
- Werner Breitwieser, 89, German politician, member of the Landtag of Hesse (1989–1999).
- Francis Campaner, 80, French road bicycle racer.
- George W. Cave, 97, American author and CIA agent.
- Samai Charoenchang, 71, Thai politician, MP (1995–2000, 2007–2011), senator (2006).
- Heinz Cibulka, 83, Austrian photographer and assemblage artist.
- Alexander Danilin, 66, Russian psychotherapist, psychiatrist and physician-narcologist.
- Jacques Grandon, 99, French politician, member of the General Council of Vienne (1965–2008), senator (1986–1988).
- Mary Heilmann, 86, American contemporary artist, complications from a fall.
- Brian Holguin, 61, American comic book writer (Aria, Spawn, Kiss: Psycho Circus).
- Butch Huskey, 54, American baseball player (New York Mets, Seattle Mariners, Boston Red Sox), pulmonary embolism.
- Rosalina Jalosjos, 79, Filipino politician, governor of Zamboanga del Norte (2022–2025).
- Yayoi Kusama, 97, Japanese contemporary artist, multiple organ failure.
- Phil Lyne, 79, American rodeo cowboy.
- Dave Marsh, 76, American music critic (The Rolling Stone Album Guide), magazine editor (Creem), and radio talk show host (SiriusXM).
- Deirdre McSharry, 94, British magazine editor (Cosmopolitan, Country Living).
- Bou Meng, 85, Cambodian prisoner, survivor of S-21.
- Anatoly Mikhaylov, 89, Belarusian radiologist.
- Duane Nutt, 92, American football player (Philadelphia Eagles).
- Anna Parzymies, 87, Polish Arabist and doctor.
- Örjan Ramberg, 78, Swedish actor (Deadline, Love Me!, False as Water).
- Jimmy Rimmer, 78, English footballer (Arsenal, Aston Villa, national team).
- Nikki Ross, 52, American gospel singer.
- Mohamed Serghini, 96, Moroccan poet.
- Yevhen Shaho, 84, Ukrainian politician, deputy (2006–2012).
- Arnon Soffer, 90, Israeli geographer.
- Finlay Tarling, 19, Welsh racing cyclist, traffic collision.
- Sir John Timmins, 94, British businessman and public servant, lord lieutenant of Greater Manchester (1988–2007).

=== 15 ===
- Daria Alyoshkina, 44, Ukrainian visual artist.
- Claude Antonini, 80, French singer-songwriter.
- Baek In-chun, 83, South Korean baseball player (Lotte Orions, Sammi Superstars) and manager (LG Twins), heart attack.
- Neville Callam, Jamaican Baptist minister, secretary general of the BWA (2007–2017).
- Manuel Gaspar Soares da Silva, 66, East Timorese politician, MP (2012–2017).
- Duca, 92, Brazilian footballer (Flamengo, Real Zaragoza, Mallorca).
- Jan Frycz, 72, Polish actor (Pornografia, The Welts, 25 Years of Innocence).
- Heinz-Peter Gasse, 73, German politician, member of the Landtag of North Rhine-Westphalia (2000–2001).
- Peter Howell, 85, British academic and historian.
- Tommy John, 83, American baseball player (Los Angeles Dodgers, New York Yankees, Chicago White Sox), eponym of Tommy John surgery, bladder cancer.
- Flavia Lattanzi, 85, Italian jurist, judge of the ICTR (2003–2006) and the ICTY (2007–2016).
- Stefanos Manos, 86, Greek politician, minister of finance (1992–1993) and MP (1977–2007).
- Paschal McGuinness, 92, American labor union activist.
- Alex Mukulu, 72, Ugandan playwright.
- Marcel Neven, 82, Belgian politician, MP (1985–1991), Walloon deputy (1995–2014).
- John Niland, 82, American football player (Dallas Cowboys, Philadelphia Eagles).
- Randal C. Picker, 66, American legal scholar.
- Barry "The Reazar" Richards, 83, American radio and television personality.
- Rufat Riskiyev, 76, Uzbek middleweight boxer, Olympic silver medallist (1976).
- Marcos Rodríguez Pantoja, 80, Spanish feral child, subject of Among Wolves.
- Kenneth Røpke, 60, Danish Olympic track cyclist (1988), cardiac arrest.
- Elisabeth Schnell, 93, German politician, member of the Landtag of Bavaria (1974–1982, 1988–1990).
- Chutima Sidasathian, 44, Thai investigative journalist.
- Peggy Webber, 100, American actress (Dragnet, Macbeth, The Smurfs).
- Milena Zupančič, 79, Slovenian actress (The Widowhood of Karolina Žašler, Idealist, Journalist).

=== 16 ===
- Princess Anastasia of Prussia, 82, German aristocrat.
- William G. Anderson, 98, American surgeon and civil rights activist.
- Asish Banerjee, 74, Indian politician, West Bengal MLA (2001–2026).
- Marcelle Benoit, 104, French musicologist and music historian.
- John Flaherty, 84, New Zealand cricketer (Otago).
- Nick Glennie-Smith, 74, English film composer (The Rock, The Man in the Iron Mask, We Were Soldiers).
- Franklin Kury, 89, American politician, member of the Pennsylvania Senate (1973–1980).
- Dee Margetts, 71, Australian politician.
- Susanna Nobili, 74, Italian architect and academic.
- Hayden Panettiere, 36, American actress (Heroes, Nashville, Kingdom Hearts), accidental drug overdose.
- Barry Pearson, 76, American football player (Pittsburgh Steelers, Kansas City Chiefs).
- Josep Anton Ribes, 84, Andorran businessman and politician, member of the General Council (1990–1992, 1994–1997).
- Clyde Robbins, 95, American coast guard vice admiral.
- Pierre Sagna, 76, Senegalese Olympic basketball player (1972).
- Raja Sen, 70, Indian film director (Damu, Desh).
- Hasan M. El-Shamy, 88, Egyptian-born American folklorist.
- Durga Lal Shrestha, 91, Nepali poet and lyricist.
- Venus, 17, American tortoiseshell cat, kidney disease.
- Rex A. Wade, 89, American historian.
- John Whenham, 80, English musicologist.

=== 17 ===
- Itziar Alba Orbegozo, 83, Spanish politician, member of the Basque Parliament (1991–1994, 1994–1998).
- Nicolas Altmayer, 61, French film producer (Sky Fighters, The First Day of the Rest of Your Life, The New Girlfriend), traffic collision.
- Mike Bailey, 84, English footballer (Charlton Athletic, Wolverhampton Wanderers, national team), complications from dementia.
- Frank Beard, 77, American Hall of Fame rock drummer (ZZ Top).
- O. J. Brigance, 56, American football player (Baltimore Ravens, Miami Dolphins, BC Lions), complications from amyotrophic lateral sclerosis.
- Laura Cardoso, 98, Brazilian actress (Gabriela, The Other Side of the Street, Como uma Onda).
- Kenneth Chen, 86, Singaporean politician, MP (1992–2001).
- Frank Clarke, 89, Welsh cricketer (Glamorgan).
- Alex Fiorio, 61, Italian rally driver, stomach cancer.
- Abdelaziz Guerda, 79, Algerian actor (Hassan Taxi, Rendezvous with Destiny).
- Harry van der Kamp, 79, Dutch bass and voice teacher.
- Stanislas Lalanne, 78, French Roman Catholic prelate, bishop of Coutances (2007–2013) and Pontoise (2013–2024).
- Robert Lanou, 98, American physicist.
- Javier Lasagabaster, 93, Spanish politician.
- Bob Lee, 81, American football player (Minnesota Vikings, Atlanta Falcons, Los Angeles Rams).
- Sonia Melchett, 100, British socialite and author.
- Orientate, 27, American Thoroughbred racehorse, euthanized.
- Manfred Poerschke, 92, German Olympic sprinter (1956).
- Sylvie Rimbert, 99, French geographer and cartographer.
- Fritz Schramma, 78, German politician, mayor of Cologne (2000–2009), cancer.
- Johnny Schuth, 84, French footballer (Strasbourg, Metz, national team).
- Paul Shaw, 77, Canadian Olympic sport shooter (1996).
- Ron Smith, 90, English footballer (Altrincham, Crewe Alexandra, Southport).
- Andrey Sobolyev, 71, Russian politician, senator (2014–2017).
- Dick Stevens, 78, American football player (Philadelphia Eagles), complications from dementia and Parkinson's disease.
- Constantine Tsoucalas, 89, Greek sociologist, academic and politician, MP (2015).
- Klaus Törnudd, 94, Finnish diplomat.
- Vincent Van Brunt, 82, American chemical engineer.

=== 18 ===
- Igor Akhba, 77, Abkhaz diplomat and politician, minister of foreign affairs (2004).
- Norman A. Bailey, 95, American economist.
- Jean-Louis Brunaux, 72, French archaeologist.
- Mireille Calle-Gruber, 81, French literary critic and academic.
- Cándido Cárdenas Villalba, 84, Paraguayan Roman Catholic prelate, bishop of Benjamín Aceval (1998–2018).
- G. Wallace Caulk Jr., 85, American politician, member of the Delaware House of Representatives (1985–2006).
- Jean Chapman, 96, British novelist.
- Cindy Denby, 70, American politician, member of the Michigan House of Representatives (2009–2014).
- Anthony Devaney, 86, American electrical engineer.
- P. E. Easterling, 92, English classical scholar.
- Vereslav Eingorn, 69, Ukrainian chess grandmaster, coach and author.
- Frank R. Fisher, 99, American jazz trumpeter and composer.
- Roland Hahn, 80, German politician, member of the Landtag of Baden-Württemberg (1972–1984).
- Vladek Lacina, 77, Czech rower, Olympic bronze medalist (1976). (death announced on this date)
- Dave Lanphear, 58, American comic book artist (Batman: The Long Halloween, Superman '78, The Mighty Avengers), complications from diabetes.
- Peter Llewellyn-Jones, 76, English sign language interpreter and actor (The Riddlers).
- Fulvio Lucisano, 98, Italian film producer (Planet of the Vampires, Down the Ancient Staircase, What Have You Done to Solange?).
- Kitty Lunn, 76, American ballet dancer, actress and disability activist, cardiovascular disease.
- Eduardo Maglioni, 80, Argentine footballer (Independiente, Huracán), complications from heart surgery.
- Wayne McKoy, 68, American basketball player (CB Estudiantes, CD Cajamadrid).
- Glória Menezes, 91, Brazilian actress (O Pagador de Promessas, Irmãos Coragem, Rainha da Sucata).
- Shaul Mishal, 81, Israeli political scientist.
- B. C. Nagesh, 67, Indian politician, Karnataka MLA (2008–2013, 2018–2023).
- Tawfique Nawaz, 76, Bangladeshi political activist, complications from a stroke.
- Yukio Ota, 86, Japanese graphic designer (LoCoS), pneumonia.
- Samir Radwan, 84, Egyptian economist and politician, minister of finance (2011).
- Bill Rasmussen, 93, American television executive, founder of ESPN, complications from Parkinson's disease.
- J. N. Roberts, 84, American motorcycle racer.
- Yvette Roudy, 97, French politician, minister of women's rights (1981–1986), deputy (1997–2002) and mayor of Lisieux (1989–2001).
- Satish Chandra Roy, 84, Bangladeshi politician, MP (1986–1988, 1991–2001).
- Vedrana Rudan, 76, Croatian journalist (Nacional) and novelist, cholangiocarcinoma.
- Mieczysław Szyszka, 64, Polish politician, senator (2005–2007).
- Juan Tamariz, 83, Spanish magician.
- Wanda Traczyk-Stawska, 99, Polish psychologist, social activist and World War II veteran.
- Varenne, 31, Italian Standardbred racehorse, heart attack.
- Ollie Waldron, 83, Irish rugby union player (Ireland).
- Charles Walker, 78, American politician, member of the Georgia State Senate (1990–2002, 2004–2005).
- John Walker, 83, English cinematographer (Bergerac, Doctor Who).
- Tamisuke Watanuki, 99, Japanese politician, minister of construction (1990), member (1969–2009) and speaker (2000–2003) of the House of Representatives.
- Barbara Brown Zikmund, 86, American historian.

=== 19 ===
- John Allen, 97, British engineer and plasma physicist.
- Bishnu S. Atal, 93, Indian physicist.
- Bérangère Bonvoisin, 73, French actress (The Adolescent, Les Égouts du paradis, Hôtel du Paradis) and theatre director.
- Elaine Cheris, 80, American Olympic fencer (1988, 1996).
- José Cusí, 92, Spanish Olympic sports shooter (1968).
- Rochford Devenish-Meares, 78, Australian footballer (Hawthorn, Subiaco).
- Thomas Freienstein, 66, German Olympic cyclist (1984).
- Virginio Gazzolo, 89, Italian actor (The Birds, the Bees and the Italians, Day of Anger, Deadly Inheritance).
- Sylvie Groulx, 73, Canadian filmmaker (Love Me, Love Me Not, La Classe de Madame Lise).
- Shmuel Harlap, 81, Israeli businessman and startup investor.
- Elisabeth Kiausch, 93, German politician, member of the Hamburg Parliament (1970–2004).
- Dorothy Kloss, 102, American dancer.
- Bill Lubenow, 87, American historian.
- Ray MacDonald, 49, Thai actor (Fun Bar Karaoke, Phobia 2, Opapatika).
- Ġorġ Mallia, 68, Maltese communications academic, author and cartoonist.
- Hasib Quwayi Markaz, 34, Afghan military commander, shot.
- Robert Mouynet, 96, French footballer (Toulouse, Olympique Lyonnais, national team).
- Tommy Murray, Scottish footballer (Falkirk, Queen of the South, Tranmere Rovers).
- Ricardo Pachón, 88, Spanish music producer, arranger and composer.
- François Patriat, 83, French politician, senator (since 2008), minister of agriculture (2002), and twice deputy, injuries sustained in a cycling collision.
- Michele Pinto, 95, Italian politician, minister of agriculture (1996–1998) and senator (1983–2001).
- Lazar Radović, 88, Montenegrin footballer (Budućnost Titograd, Partizan, Yugoslavia national team).
- Tsuri Sagi, 92, Israeli military officer.
- Laima Andersone-Silāre, 96, Latvian opera singer.
- Anne Thily, 88, Belgian magistrate.
- Michael Wright, 70, American actor (The Five Heartbeats, Streamers, Oz), heart failure.
- Notable deaths in the Mount Ololokwe helicopter crash:
  - Stephany Hollihan, 41, Ecuadorian fashion designer
  - Michele Sensi-Contugi, 44, Italian-born Ecuadorian politician, businessman and intelligence head
  - José Suárez, 55, American television broadcaster

=== 20 ===
- Brent Carter, 77, American poker player.
- Fernando Caruncho, 68, Spanish landscape designer.
- Ileana Cotrubaș, 87, Romanian operatic soprano (Vienna State Opera).
- Mostafa Derkaoui, 81, Moroccan film director (About Some Meaningless Events).
- Terry Dyson, 91, English footballer (Tottenham Hotspur, Colchester United, Guildford City).
- Merrelyn Emery, 86, Australian social scientist.
- Ariel Fenster, 83, French-born Canadian chemist and science educator.
- Wilem Frischmann, 95, British structural engineer (Centre Point, Tower 42, Drapers' Gardens).
- James Harkness, 90, Scottish Church of Scotland minister, moderator of the General Assembly (1995–1996).
- Darrell Hickman, 91, American jurist, justice of the Arkansas Supreme Court (1977–1990).
- John Iliffe, 87, British historian.
- Bob Ives, 87, Australian politician, Victoria MLA (1988–1996).
- Nancy Kissinger, 92, American philanthropist and political aide (Nelson Rockefeller).
- Sajjan Kumar, 80, Indian politician and convicted murderer, MP (1980–1984, 1991–1996, 2004–2009).
- Leslie Lea, 83, English footballer (Blackpool, Cardiff City, Barnsley).
- Bunny Levine, 97, American actress (Thelma).
- Jay Maisel, 95, American photographer (Kind of Blue).
- Nanda Malini, 82, Sri Lankan singer.
- Fikile Mokgohloa, 65, South African jurist, judge of the Supreme Court of Appeal (since 2019).
- Louis Pelâtre, 86, French Roman Catholic prelate, vicar apostolic of Istanbul (1992–2016).
- Carlos Reyes López, 69, Mexican politician, deputy (2006–2009).
- Barry Rogerson, 90, British Anglican cleric, bishop of Wolverhampton (1979–1985) and Bristol (1985–2002).
- Perry Rosemond, 89, Canadian television writer and producer (The Way It Is, King of Kensington).
- Cédric Sbirrazzuoli, 39, Monegasque racing driver, cancer.
- Anny Schlemm, 97, German operatic soprano and mezzo-soprano.
- Tomislav Simović, 92, Serbian general.
- Billy Smith, 84, Australian rugby league player (St. George Dragons, New South Wales, national team).
- Christian Styles, 29, American pornographic actor and adult model, alcohol and mitragynine poisoning.
- Messan Toudji, 29, Togolese footballer (Anges FC, Gomido, national team).
- Farit Zigangirov, 72, Russian Olympic field hockey player, bronze medalist (1980).

=== 21 ===
- Sidney A. Bludman, 99, American physicist.
- Janie Bradford, 87, American songwriter ("Money (That's What I Want)", "Too Busy Thinking About My Baby", "Your Old Standby").
- Herbert Dixon, 106, American golfer.
- Antony Donaldson, 86, British painter and sculptor.
- Steve Edmonds, 72, Australian rugby league player (Cronulla-Sutherland, Halifax).
- Andrée Ehresmann, 91, French mathematician.
- Matteo Fiorini, 48, Sammarinese politician, captain regent (2011–2012, 2017–2018).
- Ira A. Fulton, 94, American philanthropist.
- Paul Gauselmann, 91, German slot machine executive, founder and CEO of Gauselmann.
- Jean Giard, 99, French politician, MP (1986–1988).
- Sowcar Janaki, 94, Indian actress (Iru Kodugal, Puthiya Paravai, Kaviya Thalaivi).
- Nancy Kassebaum, 94, American politician, member of the U.S. Senate (1978–1997).
- Syarhei Kastsyan, 85, Belarusian politician, MP (1996–2001).
- William Lewis, 94, American tenor.
- V. C. Manning, 78, American politician, member of the Mississippi House of Representatives (1996–2000) and Senate (1984–1988).
- José Maria Júnior, 83, Portuguese footballer (Vitória, Toronto Blizzard, national team).
- Jesús Martínez Álvarez, 81, Mexican politician, governor of Oaxaca (1985–1986).
- Roger McKenzie, 75, American comic book writer (Daredevil, Captain America, Ghost Rider), heart failure and kidney disease.
- Dave Morice, 79, American poet.
- Ann O'Connell, 92, American politician, member of the Nevada Senate (1984–2004).
- Zdeněk Šesták, 100, Czech composer.
- Jerome Smith, 87, American civil rights activist.
- Gérard Stenger, 94, French ultrarunner, co-founder of the International Association of Ultrarunners.
- Imam Tantowi, 80, Indonesian film director (Soerabaia 45, Fatahillah) and screenwriter (Jaka Sembung).
- Zolani Tete, 38, South African IBF junior bantamweight (2014–2015), WBO bantamweight (2017–2019) champion boxer, shot.
- Jacques Van Gompel, 79, Belgian politician, mayor of Charleroi (2000–2006).
- Frans Verbeeck, 85, Belgian road bicycle racer.
- Yao Eng-chi, 91, Taiwanese politician, member (1981–2005) and vice president (1999–2002) of the Legislative Yuan.

=== 22 ===
- John Anson, 77, Canadian professional wrestler (NWA, NWF).
- Bill Ayres, 85, American talk radio host, co-founder of WhyHunger.
- Marion Blackwell, 98, Australian landscape architect and ecologist.
- Quévin Castro, 25, Portuguese footballer (West Bromwich Albion, York City).
- Kiattichai Chaichaowarat, 87, Thai politician, president of office of the prime minister (1997).
- Manoel Dias, 88, Brazilian politician, minister of labour (2013–2015).
- Shelley Fabares, 82, American actress (The Donna Reed Show, Coach) and singer ("Johnny Angel"), complications from pneumonia.
- Séfou Fagbohoun, 80, Beninese oil industry executive and politician, MP (1991–1995, 2007–2015).
- barbara findlay, 77, Canadian LGBT rights activist and lawyer.
- Kaiser, 65, Burmese singer-songwriter.
- Siim Kallas, 77, Estonian politician, prime minister (2002–2003), minister of foreign affairs (1995–1996) and European commissioner (2004–2014).
- Ignacy Karpowicz, 50, Polish writer.
- Alejandro Larrea, 59, Uruguayan football player (Estudiantes, national team) and manager (Guanacasteca).
- Latimore, 86, American soul singer ("Let's Straighten It Out").
- Hans Maurer, 93, German politician, member of the Landtag of Bavaria (1970–1998).
- Sengaku Mayeda, 95, Japanese writer and philosopher.
- Sir Andrew Nicol, 75, British judge, justice of the High Court (2009–2021).
- Philippe Puaud, 89, French politician, deputy (1986–1988).
- Bobby Ross, 84, Scottish football player (Brentford, Shrewsbury Town) and coach (Hayes). (death announced on this date)
- Paul S. Russell, 101, American physician.
- Sabirzhan Ruziyev, 73, Uzbek fencer, Olympic silver medallist (1980).
- Charlie St. Clair, 76, American politician, member of the New Hampshire House of Representatives (2017–2020, since 2022), heart failure following a traffic collision.
- Max Trenorden, 78, Australian politician, Western Australian MLA (1986–2008).
- Slava Veder, 99, American photojournalist (Burst of Joy).

=== 23 ===
- Tofig Bakikhanov, 95, Azerbaijani composer.
- Harry Bramma, 89, British organist (All Saints, Margaret Street), composer and academic teacher (King's School, Worcester, director of the Royal School of Church Music).
- Alcide Cerato, 87, Italian racing cyclist.
- Alphonse Djédjé Mady, 81, Ivorian politician.
- Roy Drinkard, 106, American real estate executive.
- Boris Ebzeyev, 76, Russian politician and jurist, head of Karachay-Cherkessia (2008–2011), judge of the Constitutional Court (1991–2008), and member of central election commission (2011–2026).
- Eyvindur P. Eiríksson, 90, Icelandic writer.
- Asadollah Nasr Esfahani, 99, Iranian military officer and politician, minister of interior (1977–1978).
- Eileen Fenton, 98, British swimmer.
- Orit Galili-Zucker, 70, Israeli journalist and political consultant, cancer.
- Noël Godin, 80, Belgian writer, critic and actor.
- Sean Grayson, 32, American convicted murderer (murder of Sonya Massey), colon cancer.
- Taiwo Hassan, 66, Nigerian actor (Aníkúlápó), cancer.
- Bun'yō Ishikawa, 88, Japanese photographer, lymphoma.
- Imran Ullah Khan, 93, Pakistani general, governor of Balochistan (1994–1997).
- Dave Kragthorpe, 93, American college football player, coach (Idaho State Bengals, Oregon State Beavers) and administrator.
- Klaus-Michael Kühne, 89, German transport and logistics executive, chairman of Kuehne + Nagel (1966–1999).
- James Lew, 73, American stuntman (Big Trouble in Little China, Inception, Luke Cage) and actor, Emmy winner (2017), heart failure.
- Liu I-chou, 78, Taiwanese civil servant, chairman of the CEC (2014–2017).
- Jimmy Lynam, 100, Irish hurler (Glen Rovers, Cork).
- Januário Machaze Nhangumbe, 92, Mozambican Roman Catholic prelate, bishop of Pemba (1975–1993).
- René Malo, 84, Canadian film producer (Animal, The Decline of the American Empire, Pin), founder of Malofilm.
- Ennio Mattarelli, 98, Italian sport shooter, Olympic champion (1964).
- Terry Matthews, 90, English footballer (Aldershot, Gillingham, West Ham United).
- Svein Mønnesland, 82, Norwegian linguist.
- Amir Muhammed, 94, Pakistani political advisor.
- Nakayama Festa, 20, Japanese Thoroughbred racehorse.
- Fabrizio Plessi, 86, Italian installation artist.
- Stanley Ritchie, 91, Australian violinist.
- Benjamin M. Rosen, 93, American businessman, co-founder of Sevin Rosen Funds and CEO of Compaq (1999).
- Bruno Schrecker, 97, German-born British cellist.
- Gerhard Schwedes, 88, American football player (New York Titans, Boston Patriots).
- Sarjit Singh Kundan, 63, Malaysian Olympic field hockey player (1984, 1992) and coach.
- Gabriele Taylor, 98, British philosopher.
- Abderrahmane Tlili, 83, Tunisian businessman and politician.
- Michael Westmore II, American television editor (Star Trek: Deep Space Nine).

=== 24 ===
- Ole Bjur, 57, Danish footballer (Vanløse IF, Brøndby IF, national team), cancer.
- Giorgio Blais, 91, Italian major general.
- Sir Billy Boston, 92, Welsh rugby league player (Wigan, Blackpool Borough, Great Britain national team), complications from dementia.
- Philippe Bouvard, 96, French television and radio presenter (Les Grosses Têtes).
- Silvia Buendía, 58, Ecuadorian journalist and civil rights activist, cancer.
- Chen Wu, 71, Chinese politician, vice chairman of the NCCPPCC (since 2023) and chairman of Guangxi (2013–2020).
- Mohabbat Jan Chowdhury, 92, Bangladeshi major general and politician, MP (1986–1988) and minister of home affairs (1982–1983).
- Gathorne Gathorne-Hardy, 5th Earl of Cranbrook, 93, British zoologist and peer, member of the House of Lords (1978–1999).
- Tina Dalton, 61, Australian television presenter (Getaway) and documentary filmmaker.
- Jean-Pierre Darchen, 86, French footballer (Rennes, Lorient).
- Mitchell Doens, 79, Panamanian politician, economist and writer, cardiac arrest.
- Gene Flasch, 94, Canadian politician, Saskatchewan MLA (1971–1975).
- Fabio Grossi, 68, Italian actor (I fichissimi, The Family Friend, Darker Than Midnight) and stage director.
- Maurice Herriott, 86, British steeplechase runner, Olympic silver medallist (1964).
- Eric Karson, 86, American film director, producer and actor.
- Tanja Koen, 100, Dutch television presenter.
- Sliman Mansour, 79, Palestinian sculptor, painter, and author.
- Catherine Millot, 81, French psychologist and academic.
- Jaye P. Morgan, 94, American singer ("That's All I Want from You"), actress, and game show panelist (The Gong Show).
- Izuru Narushima, 65, Japanese film director (Midnight Eagle, The Lone Scalpel, Solomon's Perjury), lung cancer.
- Rajuddin Noeh, 86, Indonesian politician, MP (1997–1999).
- Cletus Chandrasiri Perera, 78, Sri Lankan Roman Catholic prelate, bishop of Ratnapura (2007–2024).
- Judith A. Ramaley, 84-85, American biologist and academic administrator.
- Mirosław Różański, 63, Polish politician and lieutenant general, senator (since 2023), myeloma.
- Mieczysław Rutyna, 95, Polish Olympic racewalker (1964, 1968).
- Carlos Sáenz de Santamaría, Spanish politician, minister of finance of La Rioja (1983).
- Donald Shankweiler, 91, American academic.
- Hideki Shirakawa, 90, Japanese chemist, Nobel Prize laureate (2000).
- David Whynes, 77, British health economist.

=== 25 ===
- Michel Albertini, 73, French actor (The Public Woman, The Veiled Man, Nelly and Mr. Arnaud), scenographer and writer.
- Dominique Alderweireld, 77, French procurer and brothel owner.
- Jean Allaire, 96, Canadian lawyer and politician (Allaire Report).
- Werner Breig, 94, German musicologist.
- Peter Bromhead, 93, New Zealand editorial cartoonist (Auckland Star).
- Tom Byabagamba, 59, Rwandan military officer and presidential bodyguard.
- Tim Curry, 80, English actor (The Rocky Horror Picture Show, Clue, It) and singer, Emmy winner (1991), coronary artery disease.
- Larry Dossey, 85, American internist and author.
- Lamin Khalifah Fhimah, 70, Libyan station manager (Libyan Arab Airlines), co-defendant in Pan Am Flight 103 bombing trial.
- Miloslav Gajdoš, 78, Czech double bass player and composer.
- Javier Giraldo, 82, Colombian priest and human rights activist, fall.
- Kay Goebel, 96, American counseling psychologist.
- Bernice Gottlieb, 95, American adoption activist.
- Takashi Hanyūda, 78, Japanese politician, member of the House of Councillors (2013–2025).
- Kuku Kohli, 77, Indian film director (Phool Aur Kaante, Kohraam, Suhaag), heart attack.
- Grégoire Laourou, 73, Beninese politician, minister of finance (2002–2005).
- Alois Leodolter, 95, Austrian Olympic skier (1960).
- Edythe D. London, 77, American pharmacologist.
- Anna Louizos, 69, American scenic designer and art director.
- Cyril May, 97, Australian-born American singer.
- Carl M. Morgan, 76, American politician, member of the Alaska House of Representatives (1999–2005).
- Will Murray, 73, American author (Tarzan: Return to Pal-ul-don, King Kong vs. Tarzan) and comic book writer, co-creator of Squirrel Girl.
- Francisco Antonio Nieto Súa, 77, Colombian Roman Catholic prelate, auxiliary bishop of Bogotá (2008–2011), bishop of San José del Guaviare (2011–2015) and Engativá (2015–2024).
- Per Hilmar Nybø, 60, Norwegian footballer (Brann, Fana), cancer.
- Dolly Parton, 80, American Hall of Fame singer-songwriter ("Jolene", "I Will Always Love You") and actress (9 to 5), eleven-time Grammy winner, cancer.
- Pat Putnam, 72, American baseball player (Texas Rangers, Seattle Mariners).
- Jose Rod, 63, Indian tiatr singer.
- Rich Rowland, 62, American baseball player (Detroit Tigers, Boston Red Sox).
- Andreina Yépez, 51, Venezuelan actress (Amantes de luna llena, La mujer perfecta, Hechizo de amor) and comedian, pancreatic cancer.
- Michele Zappella, 90, Italian psychiatrist.
- Zheng Fengrong, 89, Chinese high jumper.

=== 26 ===
- Toyohiro Akiyama, 84, Japanese journalist (TBS) and cosmonaut (Soyuz TM-10, Soyuz TM-11), gastrointestinal hemorrhage.
- Ole Andreasen, 87, Danish politician and journalist, MEP (1999–2004).
- Gergely Boros, 42, Hungarian sprint kayaker, world champion (2007).
- Bob Crowe, 90, Australian footballer (Carlton).
- Peter Cullen, 85, Canadian voice actor (Transformers, Winnie the Pooh, Chip n' Dale Rescue Rangers), cardiac arrest.
- Mark S. DeFrancesco, 76, American politician, member of the Connecticut House of Representatives (1973–1975).
- Andrea Eastman, 86, American casting director (The Godfather, Love Story) and talent manager (Sylvester Stallone).
- Vladimir Germanenko, 82, Russian politician, senator (2001–2008).
- Jack Grassel, 77, American jazz guitarist, traffic collision.
- George Joseph, 104, American insurance executive, founder and chairman of Mercury General.
- Joyce L. Kennard, 85, American judge, justice of the supreme court of California (1989–2014).
- Yves Lapierre, 80, Canadian composer, arranger and singer.
- Toshio Masuda, 98, Japanese film director (The Battle of Port Arthur, Red Handkerchief, Rusty Knife).
- Bert Matter, 89, Dutch minimalist composer and organist.
- Samuel Monroe Jr., 52, American actor (Menace II Society, The Players Club, Tales from the Hood), complications from meningitis.
- Péter Nádas, 83, Hungarian writer (A Book of Memories, Parallel Stories, The End of a Family Story).
- Marty Nadler, 80, American television producer and writer (Happy Days, Laverne & Shirley, Amen), complications from myasthenia gravis.
- Pierre Neuville, 83, Belgian poker player, prostate cancer.
- Grace Nortey, 89, Ghanaian actress (Matters of the Heart, Sinking Sands, Beasts of No Nation).
- Domenico Papalia, 81, Italian mobster ('Ndrangheta), cancer.
- Rubén Rada, 83, Uruguayan singer-songwriter, complications from pneumonia.
- G. V. Narayana Rao, 72, Indian actor (Anthuleni Katha, Oka Oori Katha) and film producer (Devanthakudu).

=== 27 ===
- Patrick Baudelaire, 81, French computer scientist and engineer.
- Enda Bonner, 76, Irish politician, senator (1997–2002).
- Christian Breseghello, 71, French rugby union player (Stade Toulousain).
- Jacques Doucet, 86, Canadian sportscaster (Montreal Expos, Québec Capitales, Toronto Blue Jays).
- Bill Edwards, 81, American real estate developer, multiple organ failure.
- Vijita Fernando, 99, Sri Lankan journalist, translator and writer.
- Steven F. Havill, 81, American author.
- Richard Hayward, 72, English cricketer (Hampshire, Central Districts, Somerset).
- Robert C. Hughes, 85, American chemist.
- Brad Johns, 70, American hair colorist.
- Shigeko Kagawa, 115, Japanese supercentenarian.
- Carla Marchelli, 91, Italian Olympic skier (1956, 1960).
- Ratko Mladić, 84, Bosnian-Serb military officer and convicted war criminal (Bosnian genocide, siege of Sarajevo), commander of the Army of Republika Srpska (1992–1996), complications from multiple strokes.
- T. K. D. Muzhappilangad, 80, Indian writer, injuries sustained in a traffic collision.
- David Odell, 83, American television writer (The Muppet Show) and screenwriter (The Dark Crystal, Masters of the Universe), Emmy winner (1981).
- Alfred Rohr, 80, Austrian politician, member of the Landtag of Burgenland (2003–2005).
- Rukidi IV of Tooro, 34, Ugandan traditional ruler, Omukama of Tooro (since 1995), cancer.
- Mamtaz Sanghamita, 80, Indian politician, MP (2014–2019).
- Granville Straker, 86, American record producer and label owner.
- David Thauberger, 77, Canadian painter.
- Mary Tsingou, 97, American physicist and mathematician (Fermi–Pasta–Ulam–Tsingou problem).

=== 28 ===
- Priit Aimla, 85, Estonian writer, poet and politician, MP (1992–1995).
- Brîndușa Armanca, 71, Romanian journalist (Ziua).
- Sven-Bertil Bärnarp, 86, Swedish cartoonist.
- George Brown, 95, British medical sociologist.
- Robert K. Brown, 93, American journalist.
- Blaine Campbell, 86, American politician, member of the South Dakota House of Representatives (2013–2019).
- Larry Christenson, 72, American baseball player (Philadelphia Phillies), World Series champion (1980).
- Bill Doba, 85, American college football coach (Washington State Cougars), complications from a stroke.
- Mykola Dzyuba, 79, Ukrainian politician, deputy (1990–1994).
- King Harald V, 89, Norwegian monarch (since 1991) and Olympic sailor (1964, 1968, 1972), complications from hemolytic anemia and a bloodstream infection.
- Li Weikang, 79, Chinese Peking opera singer.
- Archibald MacKinnon, 89, Canadian rower, Olympic champion (1956) and silver medalist (1960).
- Joe McDonald, 97, American baseball executive.
- Ray Miller, 77, American politician, member of the Ohio House of Representatives (1983–1993, 1999–2002) and Senate (2003–2010).
- Grace Perreiah, 89, American artist.
- Joan Phillip, 74, Canadian politician, British Columbia MLA (since 2023).
- Jim Rittwage, 81, American baseball player (Cleveland Indians).
- Keith A. P. Sandiford, 90, Barbadian-born Canadian historian.
- Rick Sharp, 78, English-born American football player (Pittsburgh Steelers, Denver Broncos).
- Árpád Szűcs, 83, Romanian footballer (CSM Crișana Oradea, Bihor Oradea, Mureșul Deva), injuries sustained in a house fire.
- Kenneth Treister, 96, American architect (Holocaust Memorial of the Greater Miami Jewish Federation).
- Nicolae Ungureanu, 69, Romanian football player (Universitatea Craiova, national team) and manager (Drobeta-Turnu Severin).
- Kaka Mallam Yale, 73, Nigerian politician, senator (2007–2011).

=== 29 ===
- Giacomo Aimoni, 86, Italian Olympic ski jumper (1964, 1968).
- Ignacio Anastacio, Palauan businessman and politician, speaker of the House of Delegates (1997–2000).
- Gene Bertoncini, 89, American jazz guitarist.
- Narana Coissoró, 94, Portuguese lawyer, academic and politician, MP (1976–1995, 1999–2005).
- Carlos Espinosa de los Monteros y Bernaldo de Quirós, 82, Spanish civil servant and airline executive, chairman of Iberia and Aviaco (1983–1985).
- Antonino Fogliani, 50, Italian classical conductor and music director (Rossini in Wildbad).
- Franco Fontana, 92, Italian landscape photographer.
- Peter R. Griffiths, 84, British chemist.
- Helch, 34, British graffiti artist. (death announced on this date)
- Triona Holden, 67, British author, artist and journalist, autoimmune disorder.
- Johnny Hooper, 91, Irish Olympic sailor (1960, 1964).
- Antonio Landeta y Álvarez-Valdés, 89, Spanish politician, deputy (1993–2000).
- Bob Long, 92, American football player (Detroit Lions, Los Angeles Rams, Dallas Cowboys).
- Ian Martin, 75, Australian rugby league player (Manly Warringah, New South Wales).
- Dimi Mavropoulos, 76, Cypriot rally driver and businessman, drowned.
- Frankie Miller, 95, American country singer.
- Jaroslav Olejár, 67, Slovak footballer (Sparta Prague, 1. FC Košice).
- Helao Shityuwete, 92, Namibian writer and military commander (PLAN).
- Richard E. Stearns, 90, American computer scientist.
- Walter Tresch, 78, Swiss Olympic alpine skier (1972, 1976).
- Neil Walter, 83, New Zealand public servant and diplomat, administrator of Tokelau (1988–1990, 2003–2006).
- Andrzej Wielowieyski, 98, Polish lawyer and politician, senator (1989–1991, 2001–2005).
- Jeffrey G. Williamson, 90, American academic.
- Mehdi Zana, 85, Turkish Kurdish politician, mayor of Diyarbakır (1977–1980).

=== 30 ===
- Ibrahim Adam, 75, Ghanaian politician, minister of agriculture (1993–1996) and MP (1997–2001).
- Iván T. Berend, 95, Hungarian historian, president of the Hungarian Academy of Sciences (1985–1990).
- Jürgen Dietze, 83, German Olympic swimmer (1960, 1964).
- Peter Freebody, 76, Australian literary educator and researcher.
- Francesc Garrido, 56, Spanish actor (Smoking Room, The Sea Inside, Alatriste), heart attack.
- Igor Grekhov, 91, Russian physicist, member of the Russian Academy of Sciences.
- Enamul Huq, 88, Bangladeshi police officer, inspector general (1991–1992).
- Joggie Jansen, 78, South African rugby union player (Free State, national team).
- Sir Roger Jones, 83, Welsh pharmaceutical executive and researcher.
- Abid Mutlak al-Jubouri, 86, Iraqi military officer and politician.
- Oleksandr Kasyan, 37, Ukrainian footballer (Fakel Voronezh, Baltika Kaliningrad, AGMK), cardiac arrest.
- Vladimir Lakeev, 77, Russian politician.
- Paul LeDuc, 89, Canadian professional wrestler (CWF, Stampede Wrestling).
- Yoshimi Masaki, 64, Japanese judoka, world champion (1985).
- Tony Mundine, 75, Australian boxer.
- Sé O'Hanlon, 84, Irish road racing cyclist.
- Phil O'Reilly, 92, Irish Gaelic footballer (Tullamore, Offaly).
- P. David Pearson, 85, American literary scholar.
- John Sedgwick, 72, American author.
- Wiffi Smith, 89, American professional golfer.
- Slobodan Šnajder, 78, Croatian writer and publicist.
- Børge Thorup, 82, Danish footballer (Brønshøj Boldklub, Greenock Morton, national team).
- Elia Zenghelis, 89, Greek architect.

=== 31 ===
- Édouard Balladur, 97, French politician, prime minister (1993–1995), minister of finance (1986–1988), and twice deputy.
- Paul Barth, 80, German judoka, Olympic bronze medalist (1972).
- Wendell Berry, 92, American novelist and essayist (The Unsettling of America).
- Elco Brinkman, 78, Dutch politician, minister of health (1982–1989), senator (2011–2019), and twice MP.
- Kippy Brown, 71, American football coach (Houston Texans, Detroit Lions, Seattle Seahawks).
- Eduardo Calcagno, 85, Argentine film director, producer and screenwriter.
- Thomas Cease, 84, American electrical engineer.
- Cornelius Cash, 74, American basketball player (Detroit Pistons).
- Chan Sarun, 78, Cambodian politician, minister of agriculture (1998–2013) and MP (since 2003).
- Michel Fano, 96, French musician, composer and writer.
- Artūras Fomenka, 49, Lithuanian footballer (Ekranas, Kareda Šiauliai, national team).
- Anatoly Kholkin, 89, Russian chemist.
- Liam King, 86, Irish hurler (Lorrha–Dorrha, Tipperary).
- Lilia Lardone, 84, Argentine writer.
- Carlyto Lassa, 65, Congolese singer-songwriter and evangelical pastor, heart attack.
- Jean-François Leroy, 69, French journalist and photographer, director of Visa pour l'Image (since 1989).
- Arthur Marshall, 57, American football player (Denver Broncos, New York Giants), stomach cancer.
- Victor Miller, 86, American screenwriter (Friday the 13th) and television writer (Another World, Guiding Light).
- Indu Mitha, 96–97, Pakistani Bharatanatyam classical dancer.
- Carlos Monforte, 77, Brazilian journalist (TV Globo).
- Phillips Robbins, 96, American biochemist.
- Frances Stonor Saunders, 60, British journalist and historian.
- Bill Schmidt, 78, American javelin thrower, Olympic bronze medallist (1972).
- Rollie Sheldon, 89, American baseball player (New York Yankees).
- Daniel Spagnou, 85, French politician, deputy (2002–2012), mayor of Sisteron (1983–2026).
- Jerry Stovall, 85, American Hall of Fame football player (LSU Tigers, St. Louis Cardinals) and coach (LSU Tigers).
- Bernard Szajner, 82, French visual artist, inventor of the laser harp.
- Ada Yonath, 87, Israeli crystallographer, Nobel Prize laureate (2009).
- Miguel Zavaleta, 71, Argentine musician (Suéter) and songwriter ("Amanece en la ruta").
