= Grzegorz Lipowski =

Polish politician (1936–2026)

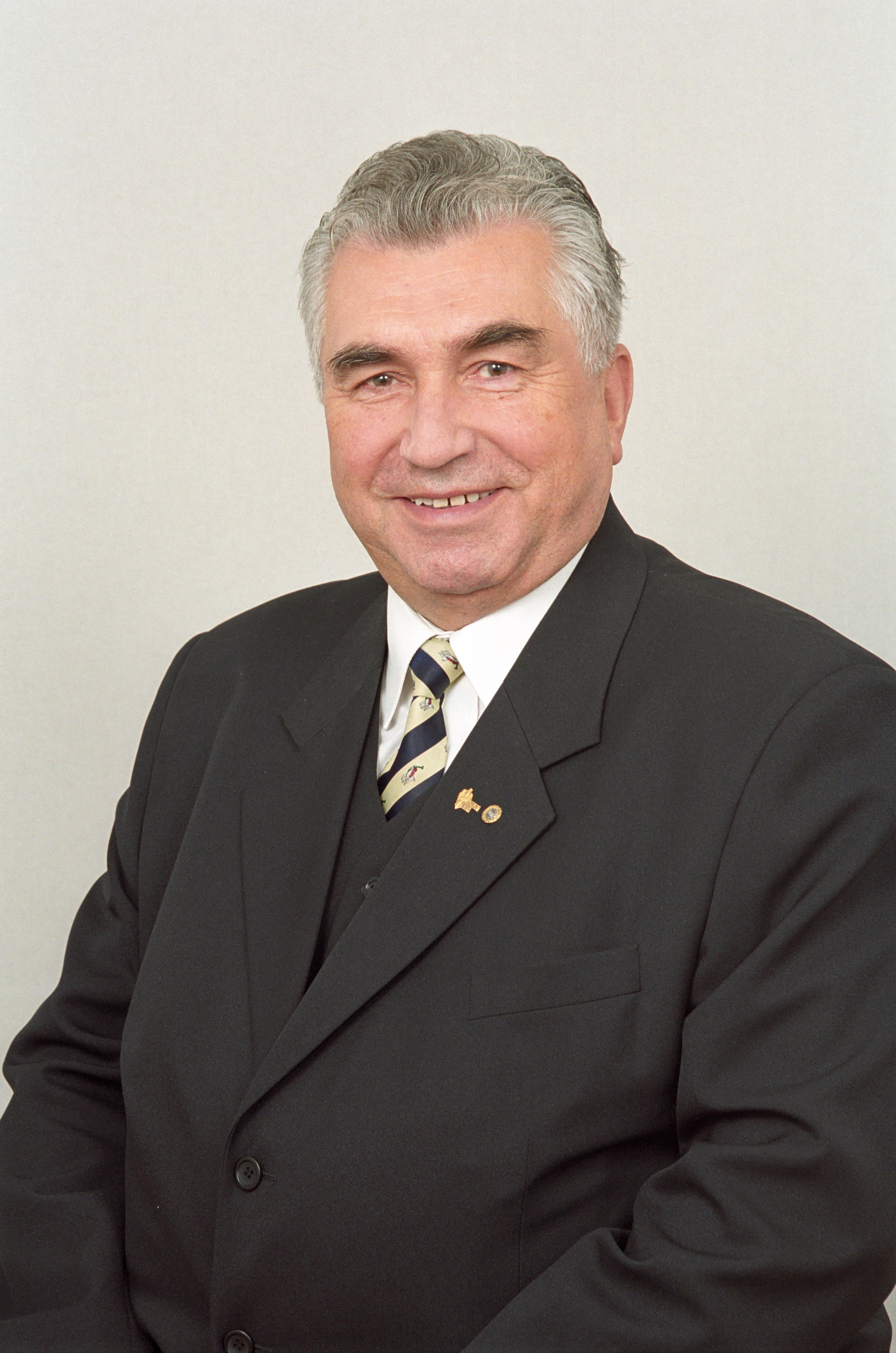
- Lipowski in 2001

Member of the Senate of Poland
- In office 20 October 1997 – 18 October 2005

Voivode of Częstochowa
- In office 31 December 1980 – 31 March 1990
- Preceded by: Mirosław Wierzbicki
- Succeeded by: Jerzy Guła

Personal details
- Born: Grzegorz Marek Lipowski; 17 June 1936 Szymki, Poland
- Died: 1 August 2026 (aged 90)
- Party: SLD
- Education: Częstochowa University of Technology; Łódź University of Technology (MS)
- Occupation: Engineer

Grzegorz Marek Lipowski (17 June 1936 – 1 August 2026) was a Polish politician. A member of the Democratic Left Alliance, he served as Voivode of Częstochowa from 1980 to 1990 and was a Senator from 1997 to 2005.

Lipowski died on 1 August 2026, at the age of 90.
