= Stanisław Adamiak =

Polish politician (1932–2026)

Member of the Sejm
- In office 25 March 1976 – 31 August 1985

Personal details
- Born: 12 November 1932 Karwacz, Poland
- Died: 14 August 2026 (aged 93)
- Party: ZSL
- Occupation: Farmer

Stanisław Adamiak (12 November 1932 – 14 August 2026) was a Polish politician. A member of the United People's Party, he served in the Sejm from 1976 to 1985.

Adamiak died on 14 August 2026, at the age of 93.
