= Alberto Tedesco =

Italian politician (1949–2026)

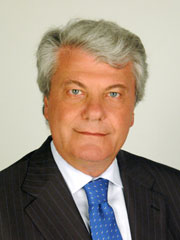
- Tedesco in 2009

Member of the Senate of the Republic
- In office 14 July 2009 – 14 March 2013
- Constituency: Apulia

Personal details
- Born: 8 April 1949 Bari, Italy
- Died: 2 August 2026 (aged 77) Bari, Italy
- Party: PSI (till 1994); FL (1994-1998); SDI (1998-2007); PD (2008–2011); PSI (2017–2026)
- Education: University of Bari
- Occupation: Business executive

Alberto Tedesco (8 April 1949 – 2 August 2026) was an Italian politician. A member of the Democratic Party, he served in the Senate of the Republic from 2009 to 2013.

Tedesco died in Bari on 2 August 2026, at the age of 77.
