= Jean Giard =

French politician (1926–2026)

- Born: 30 September 1926; Paris, France
- Died: 21 August 2026 (aged 99); Grenoble, France
- Occupation: Politician
- Political party: French Communist Party

Jean Giard (30 September 1926 – 21 August 2026) was a French politician. He served as a Communist member of the National Assembly from 1986 to 1988, representing Isère.

== Life and career ==
Giard was born in Paris on 30 September 1926.

He died in hospital in Grenoble, on the morning of 21 August 2026, at the age of 99.
