= Josep Anton Ribes =

Andorran politician (1942–2026)

Member of the General Council of Andorra
- In office 1990–1992
- In office 1994–1997

Personal details
- Born: 1942
- Died: 16 August 2026 (aged 83–84)
- Party: AND

Josep Anton Ribes (1942 – 16 August 2026) was an Andorran politician and businessman. A member of the National Democratic Group, he served in the General Council of Andorra from 1990 to 1992 and again from 1994 to 1997. Ribes died on 16 August 2026.
