= Song Du-ho =

South Korean politician (1928–2026)

- 송두호

Member of the National Assembly of South Korea
- In office 30 May 1988 – 29 May 1996

Personal details
- Born: 12 December 1928
- Died: 10 August 2026 (aged 97)
- Party: RDP; DLP
- Education: Seoul National University (BMed)
- Occupation: Doctor

Song Du-ho (Korean: 송두호; 12 December 1928 – 10 August 2026) was a South Korean politician. A member of the Reunification Democratic Party and the Democratic Liberal Party, he served in the National Assembly from 1988 to 1996.

Song died on 10 August 2026, at the age of 97.
