= Johnny Hooper (sailor) =

Irish sailor (1934–2026)

Personal information
- Full name: John Patrick A. Hooper
- Nationality: Irish
- Born: 13 December 1934 Dublin, Ireland
- Died: 29 August 2026 (aged 91) Dublin, Ireland

Sport
- Sport: Sailing

John Patrick A. Hooper (13 December 1934 – 29 August 2026) was an Irish sailor who lived in Monkstown, Co. Dublin, son of Sean Hooper of the National Yacht club. As a youngster he showed great talent in the International 12 Foot Dinghy Class sailing 'Gillian' in which he won the 1947 Irish Juvenile Championships. His father then bought him a 12 Foot Dinghy 'Ean Gaile'. After the 1952 Olympic regatta he was selected to compete at the International Junior Regatta (IJR) held at Skovshoved, near Copenhagen. In 1953 he won the Irish Helmsman's Championships at Sutton Dinghy Club, the premier sailing championships in Ireland. In the late 1950s, he joined the Water Wag class in Dun Laoghaire, where he could hone his skill at close boat to boat racing in George Jones 'Coquette'.

By the late 1950s he was racing in the 505 class where he first met Paul Elvstrom at La Baule in 1958.

He competed at both the 1960 Summer Olympics and the 1964 Summer Olympics. In the 1960 Olympics, Hooper raced in the Flying Dutchman class with Peter Gray and secured Ireland's first win in an Olympic sailing race, finishing 10th overall in the competition. In 1964, Hooper competed in the single-handed Finn class, finishing 23rd overall. Hooper died in Shankill, Dublin on 29 August 2026, at the age of 91.
