= Elisabeth Kiausch =

German politician (1933–2026)

Member of the Hamburg Parliament
- In office 14 April 1970 – 17 March 2004

Personal details
- Born: 19 January 1933 Hamburg, Germany
- Died: 19 August 2026 (aged 93)
- Party: SPD
- Occupation: Retailer

Elisabeth Kiausch (19 January 1933 – 19 August 2026) was a German politician. A member of the Social Democratic Party, she served in the Hamburg Parliament from 1970 to 2004.

Kiausch died on 19 August 2026, at the age of 93.
