= Heinz-Peter Gasse =

German politician (1952–2026)

Member of the Landtag of North Rhine-Westphalia
- In office 2 June 2000 – 31 August 2001

Personal details
- Born: 17 October 1952 Duisburg, North Rhine-Westphalia, West Germany
- Died: 15 August 2026 (aged 73)
- Party: SPD
- Occupation: Electrician

Heinz-Peter Gasse (17 October 1952 – 15 August 2026) was a German politician. A member of the Social Democratic Party, he served in the Landtag of North Rhine-Westphalia from 2000 to 2001.

Gasse died on 15 August 2026, at the age of 73.
