= Claude Antonini =

French singer-songwriter (1946–2026)

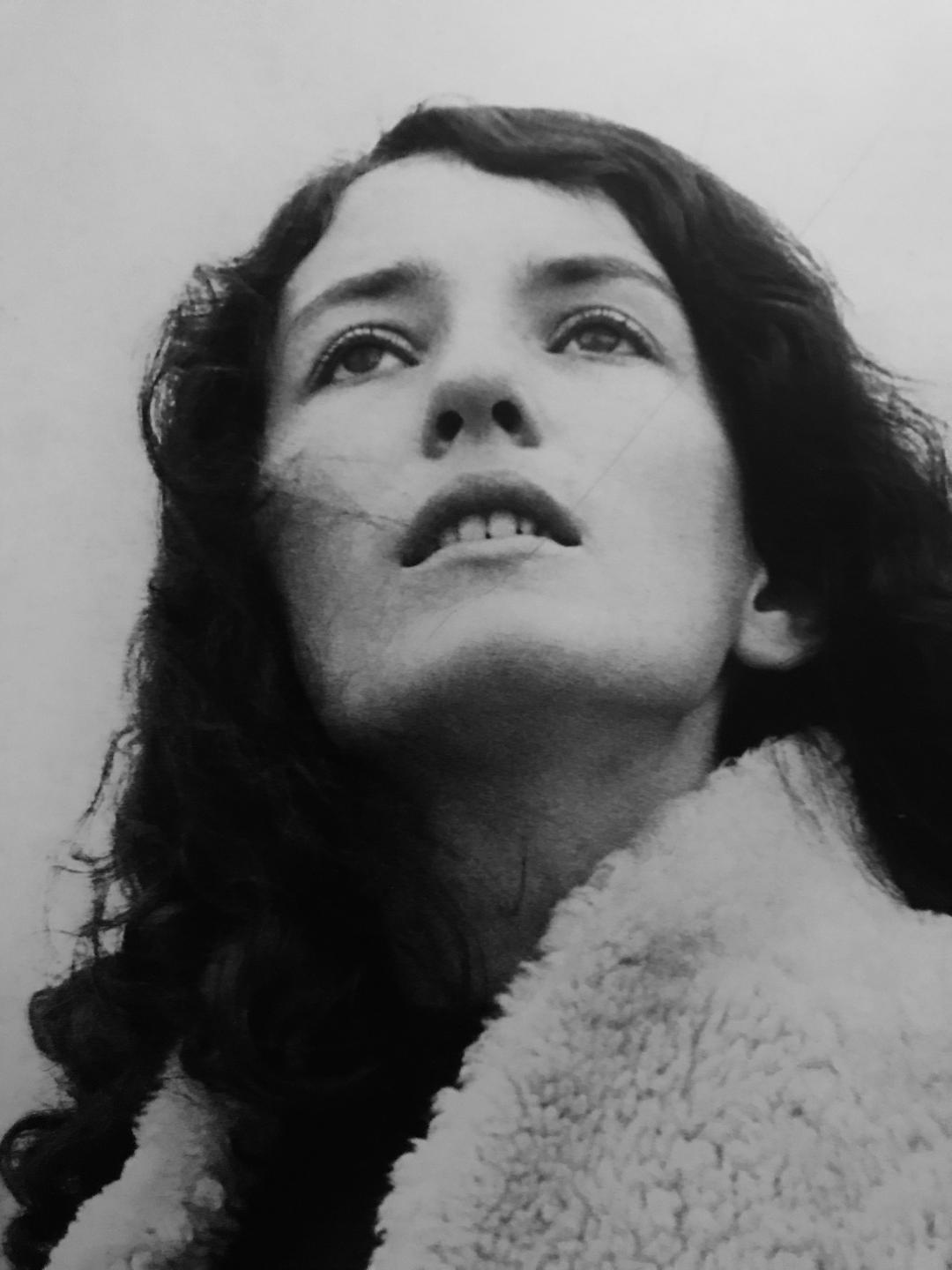
- Antonini in 1975
- Born: 11 April 1946; Belfort, France
- Died: 15 August 2026 (aged 80); Olivet, France
- Occupation: Singer-songwriter

Claude Antonini (French: [klˈod ɑ̃toninˈi]; 11 April 1946 – 15 August 2026) was a French singer-songwriter.

Antonini was known for following the styles of Paol Keineg and Gaston Couté.

Antonini died in Olivet on 15 August 2026, at the age of 80.

== Discography ==
- Claude Antonini chante Paol Keineg (1976)
- Le Cœur Partisan (1978)
- Ma fille a mal tourné (1981)
- Claude Antonini chante et dit Jehan-Rictus (1993)
- La mort lui ricane (1996)
- Les Voleurs d'étoiles (1999)
- Cromailles Dreams (2001)
- Petit à petits cubes (2002)
- Mélodies louches (2004)
- La Cuvée du Cigalier : Gaston Couté (2005)
- Jehan Rictus - Poèmes (2009)
- Claudication du Monde (2011)
- L'insurrection poétique (2015)
