= Elżbieta Barys =

Polish politician (1947–2026)

Member of the Sejm
- In office 20 October 1997 – 18 October 2001

Personal details
- Born: Elżbieta Krystyna Barys; 19 January 1947 Poznań, Poland
- Died: 13 August 2026 (aged 79)
- Party: RS
- Education: Adam Mickiewicz University in Poznań
- Occupation: Lawyer

Elżbieta Krystyna Barys (19 January 1947 – 13 August 2026) was a Polish politician. A member of the Social Movement, she served in the Sejm from 1997 to 2001.

Barys died on 13 August 2026, at the age of 79.
