= Hans Maurer (politician) =

German politician (1933–2026)

Minister of Food, Agriculture and Forestry of Bavaria
- In office 30 October 1990 – 16 June 1993
- President: Max Streibl
- Preceded by: Simon Nüssel
- Succeeded by: Reinhold Bocklet

Member of the Landtag of Bavaria
- In office 3 December 1970 – 28 September 1998

Personal details
- Born: 3 May 1933 Neuendettelsau, Gau Middle Franconia, Germany
- Died: 22 August 2026 (aged 93) Ansbach, Bavaria, Germany
- Party: CSU
- Occupation: Teacher

Hans Maurer (3 May 1933 – 22 August 2026) was a German politician. A member of the Christian Social Union in Bavaria, he served in the Landtag of Bavaria from 1970 to 1998 and was Minister of Food, Agriculture and Forestry of Bavaria from 1990 to 1993.

Maurer died in Ansbach on 22 August 2026, at the age of 93.
