= Ryszard Bartosz =

Polish politician (1953–2026)

Member of the Sejm
- In office 18 June 1989 – 31 May 1993

Personal details
- Born: Ryszard Władysław Bartosz; 23 August 1953 Tyszowce, Poland
- Died: 3 August 2026 (aged 72)
- Party: SdRP; SLD
- Education: University of Warsaw
- Occupation: Farmer

Ryszard Władysław Bartosz (23 August 1953 – 3 August 2026) was a Polish politician. A member of Social Democracy of the Republic of Poland and the SLD, he served in the Sejm from 1989 to 1993.

Bartosz died on 3 August 2026, at the age of 72.
