= Jutta Hertlein =

German politician (1939–2026)

Member of the Berlin House of Representatives for Steglitz-Zehlendorf 3
- In office 29 November 2001 – 26 October 2006
- In office 30 November 1995 – 18 November 1999

Personal details
- Born: 25 December 1939 Berlin, Nazi Germany
- Died: 4 August 2026 (aged 86) Berlin, Germany
- Party: SPD
- Education: Free University of Berlin
- Occupation: Journalist

Jutta Hertlein (25 December 1939 – 4 August 2026) was a German politician. A member of the Social Democratic Party, she served in the Berlin House of Representatives from 1995 to 1999 and again from 2001 to 2006.

Hertlein died in Berlin on 4 August 2026, at the age of 86.
