= Bernhard Billeter =

Swiss musician and musicologist (1936–2026)

- Born: 26 July 1936; Zurich, Switzerland
- Died: 4 August 2026 (aged 90); Zurich, Switzerland
- Education: University of Zurich
- Occupations: Musician; Musicologist

Bernhard Billeter (26 July 1936 – 4 August 2026) was a Swiss musician and musicologist.

Billeter studied piano under Paul Baumgartner, organ under Anton Heiller, and musicology under Kurt von Fischer. He also published numerous books on music theory and musical practice.

Billeter died in Zurich on 4 August 2026, at the age of 90.

== Publications ==
- Frank Martin. Ein Außenseiter der neuen Musik. Wirkung und Gestalt (1970)
- Die Harmonik bei Frank Martin. Untersuchungen zur Analyse neuerer Musik (1971)
- Adolf Brunner. 156. Neujahrsblatt der Allgemeinen Musikgesellschaft Zürich auf das Jahr 1972 (1972)
- Frank Martin. Werdegang und Musiksprache seiner Werke (1999)
- Musiktheorie und musikalische Praxis. Gesammelte Aufsätze (2004)
- Anweisung zum Stimmen von Tasteninstrumenten in verschiedenen Temperaturen (2010)
- Bachs Klavier- und Orgelmusik (2011)
