= Anatoly Kholkin =

Russian chemist (1937–2026)

- Анатолий Холькин
- Born: 8 March 1937; Khabarovsk Krai, Russian SFSR, Soviet Union
- Died: 31 August 2026 (aged 89)
- Education: Peter the Great St. Petersburg Polytechnic University
- Occupation: Chemist

Anatoly Ivanovich Kholkin (Russian: Анатолий Иванович Холькин; 8 March 1937 – 31 August 2026) was a Russian chemist. A member of the Russian Academy of Sciences, he was a recipient of the Order of Honour of Russia (1997).

Kholkin died on 31 August 2026, at the age of 89.
