= Oihane Mateos =

Basque journalist (1981–2026)

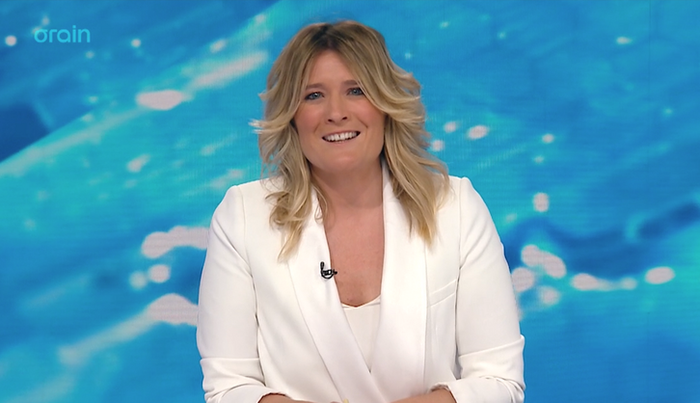
- Born: 1981; Ibarra, Basque Country, Spain
- Died: 8 August 2026 (aged 45)
- Occupation: Journalist
- Employer: EITB

Oihane Mateos Oria (1981 – 8 August 2026) was a Basque Spanish journalist who worked for EITB.

== Career ==
Mateos began her professional career at Euskadi Irratia, the radio division of EITB. She later became a television journalist and presenter for Gaur Egun and Teleberri, and directed the ETB 2 television programme De boca en boca.

In 2022, she became head of EITB's digital news service. In this position, she was responsible for the launch of EITB's digital news brand Orain in 2025.

== Personal life and death ==
Born in 1981, Mateos was from Ibarra, Gipuzkoa. She was a member of the rowing association of Orio between 2006 and 2013.

Mateos died of cancer on 8 August 2026, at the age of 45.
