= Marcelle Benoit =

French musicologist and music historian (1921–2026)

- Born: Marcelle Andrée Madeleine Benoit; 17 December 1921; Lille, France
- Died: 16 August 2026 (aged 104)
- Education: Conservatoire de Paris
- Occupations: Musicologist; Music historian

Marcelle Andrée Madeleine Benoit (French: [maʁsˈɛl ɑ̃dʁˈe madlˈɛn bənwˈa]; 17 December 1921 – 16 August 2026) was a French musicologist and music historian.

A graduate of the Conservatoire de Paris, she published numerous books and articles on music history, including the Dictionnaire de la musique en France aux XVIIe et XVIIIe siècles. From 1988 to 2003, she was president of the Société d'études philidoriennes.

Benoit died on 16 August 2026, at the age of 104.

== Publications ==
- Œuvres de Jean-Philippe Rameau (1949)
- Jean-Philippe Rameau, le cadre et le milieu, les œuvres, appréciation sur l'œuvre (1949)
- Contribution à la connaissance des musiciens de la Chapelle et de la Chambre du roi, 1661-1727, renseignements d'ordre historique, administratif, financier, social et musical d'après les comptes et états manuscrits des Archives nationales (1954)
- La Vie musicale en Île-de-France sous la Régence : onze années à la Chapelle royale de musique d'après une correspondance inédite, 1716-1728 (1955)
- Dix années à la Chapelle royale de musique (1957)
- Notes et références pour servir à une histoire de Michel-Richard de Lalande, 1657-1726, établies d'après les papiers d'André Tessier, précédées de documents inédits et suivies du catalogue thématique de l'œuvre (1957)
- Retour à Michel-Richard de Lalande et note sur le contrat de mariage d'une sœur de M.-R. de Lalande (1960)
- Note sur le contrat de mariage d'une sœur de M.-R. de Lalande (1960)
- Une dynastie de musiciens versaillais : Les Marchand (1960)
- Quatre ecclésiastiques en goguette ou Un souper qui finit mal (1961)
- Les Musiciens de Versailles à travers les minutes notariales de Lamy versées aux Archives départementales de Seine-et-Oise (1963)
- Une association de joueurs d'instruments à Paris en 1681 (1964)
- Les Musiciens de Versailles à travers les minutes du bailliage de Versailles conservées aux Archives départementales de Seine-et-Oise (1966)
- Musiciens français du XVIIIe siècle (1966)
- Quelques nouveaux documents sur François Couperin (1968)
- Mélanges François Couperin (1968)
- Les Grandes dates de l'histoire de la musique (1969)
- Musiques de cour : chapelle, chambre, écurie, recueil de documents, 1661-1733 (1970)
- Versailles et les musiciens du roi: étude institutionnelle et sociale 1661-1733 (1971)
- Les Musiciens de Versailles à travers les minutes notariales de Maître Gayot versées aux Archives départementales de Seine-et-Oise (1975)
- Tourneurs sur bois et manufactures d'instruments à vent en Haute-Normandie (1980)
- Les Musiciens du Roi de France 1661-1733 (1982)
- La Musique tchèque (1982)
- La Musique électroacoustique (1982)
- André Marchal 1894-1980 (1987)
- Joseph Canteloube (1988)
- Dictionnaire de la musique en France aux XVIIe et XVIIIe siècles (1992)
- L'Europe musicale au temps de Louis XIV (1993)
- Norbert Dufourcq 1904-1990 (1993)
- Les événements musicaux sous le règne de Louis XIV (2004)
- Ego (2010)
- Bibliographie (2011)
