= Bah Oumarou Sanda =

Cameroonian diplomat (1940–2026)

Bah Oumarou Sanda (10 May 1940 – 7 August 2026) was a Cameroonian diplomat and magistrate. He was a member of the Cameroon's Constitutional Council from February 2018 until his death in August 2026.

== Life and career ==
Bah Oumarou Sanda was born on 10 May 1940. He served as Cameroon's Ambassador to Chad from February 2008 until February 2018.

He was Deputy Secretary-General of the National Assembly of Cameroon before President Paul Biya appointed him as Ambassador to Chad on 22 February 2008.

Sanda died on 7 August 2026, at the age of 86.
