= Carlos Monforte =

Brazilian journalist (1949–2026)

- Born: 3 July 1949; Santos, São Paulo, Brazil
- Died: 31 August 2026 (aged 77); Brasília, Distrito Federal, Brazil
- Education: Universidade Católica de Santos
- Occupation: Journalist

Carlos Américo Aguiar Monforte (3 July 1949 – 31 August 2026) was a Brazilian journalist. He worked as an anchor for TV Globo. Monforte died on 31 August 2026, at the age of 77.
