= Lúcia Viveiros =

Brazilian politician (1935–2026)

Member of the Chamber of Deputies of Brazil for Pará
- In office 1 February 1979 – 31 January 1987

Personal details
- Born: Lúcia Daltro Viveiros; 13 April 1935 Belém, Pará, Brazil
- Died: 11 August 2026 (aged 91) Belém, Pará, Brazil
- Party: MDB (1978–1979); PP (1980–1981); PDS (1982–1985); PFL (1985–1990)
- Education: Federal University of Pará
- Occupation: Civil engineer

Lúcia Daltro Viveiros (13 April 1935 – 11 August 2026) was a Brazilian politician. A member of several political parties, she served in the Chamber of Deputies from 1979 to 1987.

Viveiros died in Belém on 11 August 2026, at the age of 91.
