= Norman A. Bailey =

American economist (1931–2026)

Norman Alishan Bailey (1931 – August 18, 2026) was an American economist who was the President of the Institute for Global Economic Growth, an international economic consultant, and a US government official. He was an adjunct professor at the Institute of World Politics and taught a course on "Economics for Foreign Policy Makers."

== Employment at the National Security Council ==
Bailey served as Senior Director of International Economic Affairs for the United States National Security Council (NSC) between 1981 and 1983. During his employment at the NSC, Bailey, whose specialty was monitoring terrorism by tracking finances, was involved in the following events:

The investigation of the Bank of Credit and Commerce International (BCCI), which according to Bailey was involved in drug-running and arms-running transactions, as well as terrorism. There were allegations of a link between BCCI and the Central Intelligence Agency (CIA,) and Bailey was quoted in Newsweek saying that the CIA was not interested in "blowing the BCCI cover."

== Death ==
Bailey died on August 18, 2026, at the age of 95.

== Selected publications ==
- Latin America: Politics, economics and Hemispheric Security
- Latin America in World Politics
- Portuguese Africa
- Operational Conflict Analysis
- The Mexican Time Bomb
- The Strategic Plan That Won the Cold War
