= Ingeborg Friebe =

German politician (1931–2026)

President of the Landtag of North Rhine-Westphalia
- In office 31 May 1990 – 31 May 1995
- Preceded by: Karl Josef Denzer
- Succeeded by: Ulrich Schmidt

Member of the Landtag of North Rhine-Westphalia
- In office 28 May 1975 – 31 May 1995

Personal details
- Born: Ingeborg Röh; 20 April 1931 Braunschweig, Germany
- Died: 11 August 2026 (aged 95)
- Party: SPD
- Occupation: Trade unionist

Ingeborg Friebe (née Röh; 20 April 1931 – 11 August 2026) was a German politician. A member of the Social Democratic Party, she served in the Landtag of North Rhine-Westphalia from 1975 to 1995 and was its president from 1990 to 1995.

Friebe died on 11 August 2026, at the age of 95.
