= David H. Lund =

American philosopher and writer (1939–2026)

- Born: David Herbert Lund; October 23, 1939; Roseau, Minnesota, U.S.
- Died: August 9, 2026 (aged 86)
- Occupation: Philosopher

David Herbert Lund (October 23, 1939 – August 9, 2026) was an American philosopher and writer. He was professor emeritus of philosophy at Bemidji State University and specialized in philosophy of mind.

== Life and career ==
Lund was born in Roseau, Minnesota, on October 23, 1939. He obtained a master's degree in psychology from University of North Dakota before he pursued his doctorate in philosophy from the University of Minnesota. His doctoral dissertation was "Private Language, the Egocentric Outlook, and the Nature of Mind". He joined the philosophy department at Bemidji State University in 1972, where he taught Philosophy until his retirement in 2010.

He criticized physicalist views of persons from self-awareness, perceptual experience and the intentionality of thought. Lund defended mind-body dualism. In his book Persons, Souls and Death, he argued that a person is an immaterial subject of conscious states, linked causally to the body but distinct from it. He argued for postmortem survival of the self.

Lund contributed to Contemporary Dualism: A Defense, published in 2014.

Lund died from cancer on August 9, 2026, at the age of 86.

== Selected publications ==
- Death and Consciousness: The Case for Life After Death (1985)
- Perception, Mind and Personal Identity: A Critique of Materialism (University Press Of America, 1994)
- Making Sense of It All: An Introduction to Philosophical Inquiry (Pearson, 2002)
- The Conscious Self: The Immaterial Center of Subjective States (Humanities Press, 2005)
- Persons, Souls and Death: A Philosophical Investigation of an Afterlife (McFarland, 2009)
- Death and Consciousness (McFarland, 2016)
