= Olivier Echaudemaison =

French makeup artist (1942–2026)

- Born: 4 April 1942; Périgueux, France
- Died: 12 August 2026 (aged 84)
- Occupation: Makeup artist

Olivier Echaudemaison (French: [olivjˈe ɛʃodmɛzˈɔ̃]; 4 April 1942 – 12 August 2026) was a French makeup artist.

== Life and career ==
Born in Périgueux on 4 April 1942, Echaudemaison grew up in a family of nurserymen. He was hired by the prestigious hairdresser Louis Alexandre Raimon at the age of 17. In the 1960s, he did makeup for numerous icons, including Grace Kelly, Jacqueline Kennedy, and Sophia Loren. In 1988, he joined Givenchy, where he created a new line of makeup. During his career, he became the preferred makeup artist of the Monégasque Royal Family. In 2019, he was named an Officer of the Ordre des Arts et des Lettres.

Echaudemaison died on 12 August 2026, at the age of 84.
