= Laima Andersone-Silāre =

Latvian opera singer (1929–2026)

- Born: 11 December 1929
- Died: 19 August 2026 (aged 96)
- Genre: Opera
- Instrument: Vocals

Laima Andersone-Silāre (11 December 1929 – 19 August 2026) was a Latvian opera singer. She died on 19 August 2026, at the age of 96.
