= Charlotte Puiseux =

French disability rights activist (1986–2026)

- Puiseux in 2020
- Born: 1986; Paris, France
- Died: 9 August 2026 (aged 39); Caen, France
- Education: Paris Diderot University; Paris Nanterre University
- Occupation: Disability rights activist

Charlotte Puiseux (French: [ʃaʁlˈɔt pyizˈø]; 1986 – 9 August 2026) was a French disability rights activist.

== Biography ==
Born in Paris in 1986, Puiseux grew up in a family of artisans originally from Manche, garage owners with "little political engagement". She suffered from spinal muscular atrophy, which she was diagnosed with at the age of six. At the age of five, she participated in the Téléthon, which she later criticized for "depoliticizing" disabilities. While attending school, she suffered from ableism; in spite of this, she went on to earn a doctoral degree from Paris Diderot University. In her professional life, she worked as a clinical psychologist.

Puiseux became an advocate for disability rights during her studies, combatting society's lack of support for disabled people. A member of the New Anticapitalist Party, she also fought for anti-capitalist, feminist, and queer causes. She rejected the idea of disabilities altogether, criticizing public infrastructure for inferior accommodation. She described her movement as "handifeminism", discussing the additional challenges faced by disabled women. She was also opposed to euthanasia and encouraged parenthood for those with disabilities.

She was married and lived and worked in Avranches. In 2025, she wrote the essay Plutôt vivre alongside Chiara Khan, which responded to comments made by Michel Drucker, who stated "I would rather die than be disabled" ahead of his heart surgery.

Puiseux died of a stroke in Caen, on 9 August 2026, at the age of 39.

== Publications ==
- De chair et de fer: vivre et lutter dans une société validiste (2022)
- Plutôt vivre: comprendre le validisme et valoriser une culture crip (2025)
- Bi.es (2026)
- Réflexions crip : Une relecture queer du handicap (2026)
