= Andrea Eastman =

American casting director (1940–2026)

Andrea Eastman (June 15, 1940 – August 26, 2026) was an American casting director. She worked on numerous films including The Godfather and Love Story. Eastman was the talent manager for Sylvester Stallone. She died on August 26, 2026, at the age of 86.
