= Mohamed Serghini =

Moroccan poet (1930–2026)

Mohamed Serghini (Arabic: محمد السرغيني; 1930 – 14 August 2026) was a Moroccan poet.

Serghini died on 14 August 2026, at the age of 96.

== Books ==
- Wa Yakoun Ihraqou Asmaehi Alatiya (And people burn the following words) Casablanca 1987
- Bahhar Jabal Qaf (The sailor of Jabal Qaf) 1991
- Al-Kaen Assibaey 1992
- Wajadtouka Fi hada Alarkhabil (I have found you in this archipel) (novel)
- Fes, from the Highest Peak of Cunning (Fes de la Plus Haute Cime des Ruses) 2003, excerpts on Arte East
