= Tristam Nada =

French singer and painter (1958–2026)

- Born: Pascal Dequatremare; 3 August 1958; Paris, France
- Died: 4 August 2026 (aged 68); Pau, France
- Occupations: Singer; Painter

Pascal Dequatremare (French: [paskˈal dəkatʁəmˈaʁ]; 3 August 1958 – 4 August 2026), better known by the stage name Tristam Nada (French: [tʁistˈam nadˈa], was a French singer and painter.

In 1975, he co-founded the punk band Guilty Razors, which released its first album, I Don't Wanna Be a Rich, in 1978. In 1980, he co-founded an art group called Les Musulmans fumants on the island of Formentera. He held his first exhibition in Paris in 1981. The group separated in 1990. He launched a successful solo singing career in 1988.

Nada died in Pau on 4 August 2026, at the age of 68.

== Discography ==
=== Albums ===
- Les femmes et les enfants d'abord (1991)

=== Singles ===
- "Bonne, bonne humeur ce matin" (1988)
- "Je veux un bébé" (1989)
- "La chanson des poissons" (1991)
- "Costume jaune" (1992)
