= Anne Thily =

Belgian magistrate (1937–2026)

- Born: 13 October 1937; Hannut, Belgium
- Died: 19 August 2026 (aged 88)
- Education: University of Liège
- Occupation: Magistrate

Anne Thily (13 October 1937 – 19 August 2026) was a Belgian magistrate.

== Life and career ==
Born in Hannut on 13 October 1937, Thily initially studied mathematics before pivoting to law at the University of Liège. She became a prosecutor and worked on the case of the assassination of André Cools. On 30 May 1996, she was appointed to the Court of Appeal of Liège. Her early months on the court saw significant developments in the Dutroux case and the Cools assassination case. Additionally, two advocates general were charged: Marc de la Brassinne for employing undocumented workers and Franz-Jozef Schmitz for breach of trust. In 2003, Véronique Ancia launched an investigation into an embezzlement case against the Société Mutuelle des Administrations Publiques, challenging the validity of documents submitted by the prosecution; Thily served as defense counsel. While investigating the Dutroux affair in Neufchâteau, she made the controversial decision to divide the case into separate files. She also assigned the Regina Louf case to judge Jacques Langlois, who replaced Jean-Marc Connerotte, further splitting up the case. She became known for her strategy of fast-trackign proceedings to reach trial quickly, though she drew widespread criticism over her authoritarian management of the Court of Appeal of Liège. In 2004, she was succeeded at the helm by Cédric Visart de Bocarmé.

Thily died on 19 August 2026, at the age of 88.
