= Benjamin Rader =

American historian and writer (1935–2026)

- Born: August 25, 1935
- Died: August 6, 2026 (aged 90); Lincoln, Nebraska, U.S.
- Education: Southwest Missouri State University; Oklahoma State University; University of Maryland, College Park
- Occupations: Historian, writer
- Spouse: Barbara Koch

Benjamin Rader (August 25, 1935 – August 6, 2026) was an American historian and writer.

== Early life and career ==
Rader was born on August 25, 1935. He attended and graduated from West Plains High School. After graduating, he earned his BA degree at Southwest Missouri State University. He also earned his MA degree at Oklahoma State University, and earned his PhD degree in American history at the University of Maryland, College Park in 1964.

He served as a professor in the department of history at the University of Nebraska–Lincoln. During his years as a professor, in 1995, he was named the James L. Sellers Professor of History. In 2017, he wrote the book Down on Mahans Creek: A History of an Ozarks Neighborhood, published by the University of Arkansas Press.

== Personal life and death ==
Rader was married to Barbara Koch. Their marriage lasted until Rader's death in 2026.

Rader died in Lincoln, Nebraska on August 6, 2026, at the age of 90.
