= Werner Breitwieser =

German politician (1937–2026)

Member of the Landtag of Hesse
- In office 11 September 1989 – 4 April 1999

Personal details
- Born: 14 August 1937 Grasellenbach, Gau Hesse-Nassau, Nazi Germany
- Died: 14 August 2026 (aged 89) Wald-Michelbach, Hesse, Germany
- Party: CDU
- Education: Technische Hochschule Darmstadt
- Occupation: School administrator

Werner Breitwieser (14 August 1937 – 14 August 2026) was a German politician. A member of the Christian Democratic Union, he served in the Landtag of Hesse from 1989 to 1999.

Breitwieser died in Wald-Michelbach on 14 August 2026, his 89th birthday.
