= Elisabeth Schnell =

German politician (1932–2026)

Member of the Landtag of Bavaria
- In office 28 April 1988 – 24 October 1990
- In office 6 May 1974 – 20 October 1982

Personal details
- Born: 27 October 1932 Zusamaltheim, Bavaria, Germany
- Died: 15 August 2026 (aged 93) Augsburg, Bavaria, Germany
- Party: CSU
- Occupation: Catechist

Elisabeth Schnell (27 October 1932 – 15 August 2026) was a German politician. A member of the Christian Social Union in Bavaria, she served in the Landtag of Bavaria from 1974 to 1982 and again from 1988 to 1990.

Schnell died in Augsburg on 15 August 2026, at the age of 93.
