= Jean-Pierre Darchen =

French football player and manager (1940–2026)

Personal information
- Date of birth: 20 May 1940
- Place of birth: Douarnenez, France
- Date of death: 24 August 2026 (aged 86)
- Place of death: Lannion, France
- Height: 1.71 m (5 ft 7 in)
- Position: Midfielder

Youth career
- –1964: Lannion

Senior career*
Years	Team	Apps	(Gls)
1964–1967	Rennes	68	(9)
1967–1971	Lorient	112	(11)
Total		180	(20)

Managerial career
- 1969–1971: Lorient (reserves)
- * Club domestic league appearances and goals

Jean-Pierre Darchen (French: [ʒˈɑ̃-pjˈɛʁ daʁʃˈɛn]; 20 May 1940 – 24 August 2026) was a French football player and manager who played as a midfielder.

Darchen was notably a member of the Rennes team that won the 1964–65 Coupe de France. However, he remained on the bench for the entirety of the final match against Sedan. He also played in the 1965–66 European Cup Winners' Cup.

Darchen died in Lannion on 24 August 2026, at the age of 86.
