= Jean-François Leroy (photographer) =

French journalist and photographer (1956–2026)

Jean-François Leroy (3 October 1956 – 31 August 2026) was a French journalist and photographer. He was a founder and the director of Visa pour l'image from 1989 until his death. Born in Paris on 3 October 1956, Leroy died on 31 August 2026, at the age of 69.
