= Freddy Makafui Dunyah =

Togolese environmental activist (1961–2026)

- Born: 1961
- Died: 12 August 2026 (aged 64–65); Lomé, Togo
- Occupation: Environmental activist

Freddy Makafui Dunyah (1961 – 12 August 2026) was a Togolese environmental activist.

== Biography ==
Born in 1961, Dunyah headed communications for the Association togolaise des consommateurs. In 2021, he became communications lead for the Ligue des consommateurs du Togo, a campaign organized within the Autorité de Régulation des Communications Électroniques et des Postes. The previous year, he participated in discussions on promoting local products and called for encouraging the consumption of products made in Togo. In December 2022, he took part in a food inspection campaign with the Ministries of Commerce and Health, ensuring accuracy with production and expiration dates. As part of the campaign, he encouraged Togolese consumers to check their products prior to purchase and for merchants to avoid selling products unfit for consumption. In 2023, he entered discussion with Togocom as communications officer for the Association togolaise des consommateurs.

Dunyah died on 12 August 2026.
