= Nicholas Davey =

British philosopher and professor of philosophy (1950–2026)

- Born: 8 August 1950
- Died: 2 August 2026 (aged 75)

Education
- Education: University of York (BA); University of Sussex (MA, PhD); University of Tübingen

Philosophical work
- Era: Contemporary philosophy
- Region: Western philosophy
- School: Continental
- Institutions: University of Dundee
- Main interests: Hermeneutics, aesthetics

Nicholas Davey (8 August 1950 – 2 August 2026) was a British philosopher and professor of philosophy at the University of Dundee. He is known for his expertise in aesthetics, hermeneutics, and his work on Hans-Georg Gadamer. Davey also played a leading role in founding several research groups and institutes at the University of Dundee, which include Theoros, Hermeneutica Scotia (research groups), and the university's Arts and Humanities Research Institute.

Davey was an active member of the Scottish Centre for Continental Philosophy. He died on 2 August 2026, aged 75.

== Books ==
- Negative Hermeneutics and the Question of Practice. London: Bloomsbury, 2024. ISBN 978-1350347649.
- Unfinished Worlds. Hermeneutics, Aesthetics and Gadamer. Edinburgh: Edinburgh University Press, 2013. ISBN 978-0748686223
- Unquiet Understanding: Gadamer's Philosophical Hermeneutics. New York: SUNY Press, 2007. ISBN 978-0791468425
