= Philippe Puaud =

French politician (1936–2026)

Member of the French National Assembly for Vendée
- In office 2 April 1986 – 14 May 1988

Personal details
- Born: 26 August 1936 Sainte-Hermine, France
- Died: 22 August 2026 (aged 89)
- Party: SFIO (1960–1969); PS (1971–1995); PCF (after 1995)
- Occupation: Civil servant

Philippe Puaud (French: [filˈip pyˈo]; 26 August 1936 – 22 August 2026) was a French politician of the Socialist Party.

Puaud served as a deputy in the National Assembly from 1986 to 1988.

Puaud died on 22 August 2026, at the age of 89.
