= Thomas Cease =

American electrical engineer (1942–2026)

- Born: Thomas Wayne Cease; August 17, 1942; Memphis, Tennessee, U.S.
- Died: August 31, 2026 (aged 84); Fairburn, Georgia, U.S.
- Education: University of Arkansas
- Occupation: Electrical engineer
- Spouse: Joyce Cease

Thomas Wayne Cease (August 17, 1942 – August 31, 2026) was an American electrical engineer.

== Early life and career ==
Cease was born in Memphis, Tennessee on August 17, 1942. He served aboard the USS Seawolf (SSN-575) in the United States Navy. After his discharge, he attended the University of Arkansas, earning his BS degree in electrical engineering.

He worked at the Tennessee Valley Authority (TVA). During his time at TVA, he specialized in the field of power systems engineering, and contributed to high-voltage transmission and optical transducer technologies. In 2000, he was named a fellow of the Institute of Electrical and Electronics Engineers, "for significant contributions to optical current and voltage measurements and the control of power in high voltage transmission systems".

== Personal life and death ==
Cease was married to Joyce. Their marriage lasted until Cease's death in 2026.

Cease died in Fairburn, Georgia on August 31, 2026, at the age of 84.
