= Gérard Stenger =

French ultrarunner (1932–2026)

- Born: 7 March 1932
- Died: 21 August 2026 (aged 94)
- Occupation: Ultrarunner

Gérard Stenger (French: [ʒeʁˈaʁ stɑ̃ʒˈe]; 7 March 1932 – 21 August 2026) was a French ultrarunner.

Stenger competed in a variety of races, from 50 kilometers to 6 day races. He also participated in over 100 marathons and was a co-founder of the International Association of Ultrarunners. He notably ran a Spartathlon, a 246 km race, in 30 hours, 32 minutes and 54 seconds in 1984.

Stenger died on 21 August 2026, at the age of 94.
