= Eileen Fenton =

English long-distance swimmer (1928–2026)

Personal information
- Born: June 1928 Dewsbury, West Riding of Yorkshire, England
- Died: 23 August 2026 (aged 98) Mirfield, West Yorkshire, England

Sport
- Sport: Swimming

Eileen Fenton, MBE (June 1928 – 23 August 2026) was an English swimmer who swam the English Channel, accomplishing the feat on 26 September 1950. Fenton completed the swim as a competitor in the First Daily Mail Channel Race. There were 24 competitors in the race and less than half of these finished. She finished in a time of 15hrs 31mins, and received a winner's cheque of £1000.

In 2019, she received an MBE in the Queen's Birthday honours for voluntary service to Long Distance and Competitive Swimming Coaching in Yorkshire and Great Britain.

Fenton died in Mirfield, West Yorkshire on 23 August 2026, aged 98.
