= Arthur Bodson =

Belgian philologist and academic (1932–2026)

- Born: Arthur Léon Joseph Bodson; 27 June 1932; Beausaint, Belgium
- Died: 12 August 2026 (aged 94); Liège, Belgium
- Education: University of Liège
- Occupations: Philologist; Academic

Arthur Léon Joseph Bodson (27 June 1932 – 12 August 2026) was a Belgian philologist and academic.

From 1985 to 1997, he was rector of the University of Liège. He received the title of Baron from King Albert II in 2009. In 2018, he was given honorary citizenship of Liège.

Bodson died on 12 August 2026, at the age of 94.
