= Peter R. Griffiths =

British chemist (1942–2026)

- Born: Peter Roughley Griffiths; January 1942; London, England
- Died: 29 August 2026 (aged 84)
- Education: St John's College, Oxford
- Occupation: Chemist
- Spouse: Marie Burns (m. 1971; died. 2016)

Peter Roughley Griffiths (January 1942 – 29 August 2026) was a British chemist.

== Early life and career ==
Griffiths was born in London in January 1942. At the age of five, he and his family moved to Burpham, and he attended The Royal Grammar School of King Edward VI. He also attended St John's College, Oxford, earning his bachelor's degree and his PhD degree. After earning his degrees, he emigrated to the United States, and worked in Ellis R. Lippincott's lab at the University of Maryland, College Park. He also worked at Digilab, Inc. in Cambridge, Massachusetts, and at Sadtler Research Labs in Philadelphia, Pennsylvania.

He served as a professor in the department of chemistry at Ohio University from 1972 to 1982. During his years as a professor, in 1980, he was named a distinguished professor. In 1982, he moved to Riverside, California, and taught at the University of California, Riverside for seven years.

In 2018, Griffiths was awarded an honorary doctor of science degree from the University of Idaho.

== Personal life and death ==
In 1971, Griffiths married Marie Burns at the Merion Tribute House in Philadelphia, Pennsylvania. Their marriage lasted until her death in 2016.

Griffiths died on 29 August 2026, at the age of 84.
