= Roland Hahn =

German politician (1946–2026)

Member of the Landtag of Baden-Württemberg
- In office 1 April 1972 – 31 May 1984

Personal details
- Born: 17 January 1946 Rottenburg am Neckar, Württemberg-Hohenzollern, Allied-occupied Germany
- Died: 18 August 2026 (aged 80)
- Party: SPD
- Education: University of Tübingen
- Occupation: Teacher

Roland Hahn (17 January 1946 – 18 August 2026) was a German politician. A member of the Social Democratic Party, he served in Landtag of Baden-Württemberg from 1972 to 1984.

Hahn died on 18 August 2026, at the age of 80.
