= Joseph C. Paradi =

Canadian academic (1941–2026)

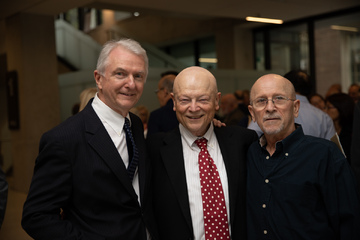
- Born: Joseph Charles Paradi; January 18, 1941; Budapest, Hungary
- Died: August 4, 2026 (aged 85); Mississauga, Ontario, Canada
- Education: University of Toronto
- Occupations: Engineer, businessman and founder of Parcorp Ltd
- Years active: 1968–2026

Joseph Charles Paradi (January 18, 1941 – August 4, 2026) was a Hungarian-born Canadian academic who was a senior professor of chemical engineering at the University of Toronto. Paradi was the founder and executive director of the Centre for Management of Technology and Entrepreneurship. He was also a chair holder in Information Engineering, Department of Chemical Engineering and Applied Chemistry.

Paradi was the founder of Parcorp Ltd., a company that invests and facilitates the growth of small Canadian high-tech companies.

== Early life and education ==
Born in 1941, he started skating at the age of 2 as his parents were ice dancing champions in Hungary. He played competitive junior hockey in Hungary at age 14 and also was the national speed skating champion for his age group. The 1956 revolution in Hungary put an abrupt end to all of this and with his parents he left his birth country in November 1956 and emigrated to Canada from England the year after.

Paradi pursued his bachelor's degree in chemical engineering at the University of Toronto in 1961. He then enrolled in a master's program a year after his graduation. Paradi also completed his PhD. from the University of Toronto in 1975.

== Career ==
Paradi commenced his career as a senior information technology expert when he founded Dataline Inc., a computer-services company, in 1969. Paradi sold the company to a U.S. firm in late 1987 and left the company in 1989 after serving for 20 years.

He restarted his relationship with the University of Toronto in 1983, as an adjunct professor in the Department of Chemical Engineering and Applied Chemistry. After his exit from the commercial sector, he joined the university as a permanent staff member in 1989. He served as a distinguished professor at the University of Toronto for over 15 years and retired in 2006. But he stayed in the university as he continued to teach courses on entrepreneurship and carried on research. During his tenure, he has supervised 17 Ph.D. theses and 62 Master's theses, 7 postdoctoral students, and 5 other researchers, in addition to 186 undergraduate theses involving 254 students in engineering.

Paradi founded the Centre for the Management of Technology and Entrepreneurship (CMTE), which is housed in the Department of Chemical Engineering & Applied Chemistry. Another notable accomplishment was the founding of the Engineering Hatchery which grows and guides new startup businesses in the Faculty of Engineering.

He was also the founder of Parcorp Ltd., a company devoted to investing in, nurturing, and facilitating the growth of small Canadian high-tech companies. Throughout his career, he started several other organizations, including a specialized technology consulting firm, two firms based on intellectual properties developed at U of T (DesignCo Inc. and Translucent Technologies Inc.), and a joint venture in Hungary, to name a few. Paradi has presented more than 170 papers at national and international technical conferences and has chaired technical sessions on more than 50 occasions. He was a speaker at International Conference on 'Data Envelopment Analysis Performance Management and Measurement' held at Beirut, Lebanon. He was also a well known collector of antique corkscrews among other hobbies.

== Death ==
Paradi died in Mississauga on August 4, 2026, at the age of 85.

== Selected books ==
- P.-Y. Badillo and J. C. Paradi "DEA: La Méthode d’analyse de Performances" Hermes Science Publications, 1999.
- Donald A. Bull and Joseph C. Paradi "Champagne Collectibles", Schiffer Publishing Limited, 2011.
- Donald A. Bull and Joseph C. Paradi "Wine Antiques & Collectibles", Schiffer Publishing Limited, 2013.
- Donald A. Bull, Joseph C. Paradi and Bert Giulian "World Class Corkscrews" Schiffer Publishing Limited, 2015
- Gail O'Dell, Roy Payne, Joseph C. Paradi and Ion Chirescu "History, Culture and Legends in British Brass Corkscrews", Art Group, Romania, August, 2015
- Joseph C. Paradi, H David Sherman and Fai Tam "Data Envelopment Analysis in the Financial Services Industry: A Guide for Practitioners and Analysts". Springer International Series in Operations Research & Management Science" Volume 266, 2018.

== Awards and honours ==
- 1988 – Entrepreneur of the Year, by the Information Industry Association, Financial Services Industry Division.
- 1996 – Nominated and Finalist for Entrepreneur of the Year in Ontario, "Supporter of Entrepreneurship" category.
- 1997 – Elected Fellow of the Canadian Academy of Engineers
- 1999 – Innovation Management Association of Canada (IMAC) – Distinguished Member Award
- 2005 – NSERC Synergy Award in collaboration with the CMTE industrial sponsor group of BMO Financial Group, Bell Canada, RBC Financial Group and TD Bank Financial group.
- 2010 – Inducted into the Engineering Alumni Hall of Distinction
- 2010 – Ontario Professional Engineers Awards (OPEA): Engineering Medal for Entrepreneurship
- 2010 – Professor Bill Burgess Teacher of the Year Award by the Department of Chemical Engineering and Applied Chemistry.

== Professional membership ==
- Professional Engineers of Ontario
- Metropolitan Toronto Board of Trade
- Canadian Association of Data and Professional Services Organisations
- Data Processing Management Association
- Information Industry Association, Financial Services Industry Division ·
- Member, Institute of Industrial Engineers
- TIMS College on Innovation, Management and Entrepreneurship
- Productivity Analysis and Research Network
- International Association for Management of Technology
- Board of Directors of Canadian Association for Management of Technology
