= Javier Lasagabaster =

Spanish politician (1933–2026)

Minister of Territorial Planning and Public Works of the Basque Government
- In office 9 April 1980 – 16 April 1984
- Preceded by: Juan José Pujana (as Minister of Spatial Planning, Urban Planning, and the Environment)
- Succeeded by: Castor Garate (as Minister of Territorial Policy, Transport and Tourism)

Personal details
- Born: Javier José Luis Lasagabaster Echarri; 5 January 1933 Pasaia, Spain
- Died: 17 August 2026 (aged 93) Irun, Spain
- Occupation: Lawyer

Javier José Luis Lasagabaster Echarri (5 January 1933 – 17 August 2026) was a Spanish politician. He served as Minister of Territorial Planning and Public Works of the Basque Government from 1980 to 1984.

Lasagabaster died in Irun on 17 August 2026, at the age of 93.
