= Sidney A. Bludman =

American physicist (1927–2026)

- Born: Sidney Arnold Bludman; May 13, 1927; New York, U.S.
- Died: August 21, 2026 (aged 99); Chevy Chase, Maryland, U.S.
- Education: Cornell University; Yale University
- Occupation: Physicist
- Spouse: Ellen Schaffer

Sidney Arnold Bludman (May 13, 1927 – August 21, 2026) was an American physicist.

== Early life and career ==
Bludman was born in New York on May 13, 1927, the son of Morris Bludman and Lena Saltz. His parents were Jewish immigrants from Poland. He attended the Bronx High School of Science, graduating in 1943. After graduating, he briefly attended the City College of New York, before transferring to Cornell University, earning his AB degree in 1945. He served in the United States Navy in the Naval Ordnance Laboratory, which after his discharge, he attended Yale University, earning his MS degree in 1948 and his PhD degree in 1951.

He served as an assistant professor at Lehigh University from 1950 to 1952, and worked at Lawrence Berkeley National Laboratory from 1952 to 1961. He served as a professor in the department of physics at the University of Pennsylvania from 1961 to 1998. During his years as a professor, in 1966, he was named a fellow of the American Physical Society.

== Personal life and death ==
Bludman was married to Ellen Schaffer. Their marriage lasted until Bludman's death in 2026.

Bludman died at his home in Chevy Chase, Maryland, on August 21, 2026, at the age of 99.
