= Vincent Van Brunt =

American chemical engineer (1944–2026)

- Born: April 6, 1944; New York City, U.S.
- Died: August 17, 2026 (aged 82); Seattle, Washington, U.S.
- Education: Carnegie Mellon University; University of Tennessee
- Occupation: Chemical engineer

Vincent Van Brunt (April 6, 1944 – August 17, 2026) was an American chemical engineer.

== Early life and career ==
Van Brunt was born in Brooklyn, New York on April 6, 1944. He attended and graduated from Friends Academy in Long Island, New York. After graduating, he attended Carnegie Mellon University, earning his BS degree in 1967. He also attended Polytechnic University, earning his MS degree in 1971, and earned his PhD degree at the University of Tennessee in 1974.

He served as a professor in the department of chemical engineering at the University of South Carolina until 2019. During his years as a professor, he was named a distinguished professor.

== Personal life and death ==
According to The State, Van Brunt dated Nancy Lane in the 2000s.

Van Brunt died in Seattle, Washington on August 17, 2026, at the age of 82.
