= Donald Mathieson (cricketer) =

Australian cricketer (1931–2026)

Personal information
- Full name: Donald Kenneth Mathieson
- Born: 24 April 1931; Nhill, Australia
- Died: 10 August 2026 (aged 95)
- Batting: Right-handed

Domestic team information
- Years: Team
- 1953–1954: Victoria
- Source: Cricinfo, 2 December 2015

Donald Kenneth Mathieson (24 April 1931 – 10 August 2026) was an Australian cricketer. He played two first-class cricket matches for Victoria between 1953 and 1954.

== See also ==
- List of Victoria first-class cricketers
