= Alfred Rohr =

Australian politician (1945–2026)

Member of the Landtag of Burgenland
- In office 2003–2005

Personal details
- Born: 3 October 1945 Hochegg, Stockenboi, Carinthia, Allied-occupied Austria
- Died: 27 August 2026 (aged 80)
- Party: ÖVP

Alfred Rohr (3 October 1945 – 27 August 2026) was an Austrian politician. A member of the Austrian People's Party, he served in the Landtag of Burgenland from 2003 to 2005.

Rohr died on 27 August 2026, at the age of 80.
