= Richard Herman (politician) =

American politician (1938–2026)

Member of the New Hampshire House of Representatives from the Hillsborough 1st district
- In office 1998–2000

Personal details
- Born: Richard Peter Herman; April 15, 1938
- Died: August 6, 2026 (aged 88) Watertown, Massachusetts, U.S.
- Party: Democratic
- Spouse(s): Susan Goldsmith (before 1985) Paula Rayman (m. 2004)
- Education: University of Massachusetts Amherst; Northeastern University

Richard Peter Herman (April 15, 1938 – August 6, 2026) was an American politician. A member of the Democratic Party, he served in the New Hampshire House of Representatives from 1998 to 2000.

== Early life and career ==
Herman was born on April 15, 1938, the son of Shepard Herman and Eunice Finkelstein. He attended Newton High School, the University of Massachusetts Amherst and Northeastern University. He worked at the summer camp Interlocken, and was a banjo player.

He served in the New Hampshire House of Representatives from 1998 to 2000.

== Personal life and death ==
Herman was married twice. He was first married to Susan Goldsmith, but their marriage ended in 1985. He then married Paula Rayman in 2004. His second marriage lasted until Herman's death in 2026.

Herman died from heart failure in Watertown, Massachusetts, on August 6, 2026, at the age of 88.
