= Manuel Gaspar Soares da Silva =

East Timorese politician (1959–2026)

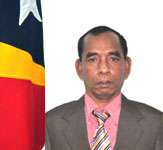

Member of the National Parliament of Timor-Leste
- In office 30 July 2012 – 31 July 2017

Personal details
- Born: 16 August 1959 Viqueque Municipality, Portuguese Timor
- Died: 15 August 2026 (aged 66) Viqueque Municipality, Timor-Leste
- Party: Fretilin
- Occupation: Teacher

Manuel Gaspar Soares da Silva (16 August 1959 – 15 August 2026) was an East Timorese politician. A member of Fretilin, he served in the National Parliament from 2012 to 2017.

Da Silva died on 15 August 2026, one day shy of his 67th birthday.
