= Sylvie Rimbert =

French geographer and cartographer (1927–2026)

- Born: 1927
- Died: 17 August 2026 (aged 99)
- Education: Strasbourg I University
- Occupations: Geographer; Cartographer

Sylvie Rimbert (French: [silvˈi ʁɛ̃bˈɛʁ]; 1927 – 17 August 2026) was a French geographer and cartographer.

A graduate of Strasbourg I University, she became a pioneer in the use of computer tools for geography, participating in early experiments of automated mapping. She worked at the French National Centre for Scientific Research alongside Colette Cauvin, becoming an honorary director of research. Her most notable work was Les paysages urbains, which received great critical acclaim.

Rimbert died on 17 August 2026, at the age of 99.

== Publications ==
- Carte et graphiques : Initiation à la cartographie (1964)
- Les paysages urbains (1973)
- La lecture numérique des cartes thématiques (1976)
- Carto-graphies (1990)
- Introduction à l'analyse de l'espace (2012)
