= Dominique Libault =

French civil servant (1961/1962–2026)

Conseiller d'État
- In office 1 January 2012 – 8 August 2026

Directeur de la Sécurité sociale
- In office 31 October 2002'\ – 13 February 2012
- Preceded by: Pierre-Louis Bras
- Succeeded by: Thomas Fatôme

Personal details
- Born: 1961 or 1962
- Died: 8 August 2026 (aged 64) Saint-Brieuc, France
- Education: Sciences Po; École nationale d'administration
- Occupation: Civil servant

Dominique Libault (French: [dominˈik libˈo]; 1961 or 1962 – 8 August 2026) was a French civil servant.

== Life and career ==
Born in 1961 or 1962, Libault studied at the Sciences Po and the École nationale d'administration. On 31 October 2002, he was named Directeur de la Sécurité sociale, succeeding Pierre-Louis Bras. He was replaced by Thomas Fatôme on 13 February 2012 after he stepped down to become a Conseiller d'État. He also served as director of the National High School of Social Security.

Dominique Libault died in Saint-Brieuc on 8 August 2026, at the age of 64.
