= Lee Yong-taek =

South Korean politician (1930–2026)

- 이용택

Member of the National Assembly of South Korea
- In office 11 April 1981 – 29 May 1988

Personal details
- Born: 29 November 1930 Dalseong County, Korea, Empire of Japan
- Died: 9 August 2026 (aged 95)
- Party: Independent
- Education: Dankook University (LLB); Korea University (MBA)
- Occupation: Activist

Lee Yong-taek (Korean: 이용택; 29 November 1930 – 9 August 2026) was a South Korean politician. An independent, he served in the National Assembly from 1981 to 1988.

Lee died on 9 August 2026, at the age of 95.
