= Carlos Sáenz de Santamaría =

Spanish politician (died 2026)

Carlos Sáenz de Santamaria

Minister of Finance of La Rioja
- In office 6 June 1983 – 3 July 1983
- President: José María de Miguel
- Preceded by: Antonio Muriel Nuñez
- Succeeded by: José Javier Bonet Bordenave-Gassedat

Personal details
- Born: Carlos Sáenz de Santamaría Alegría; 3 March 1956
- Died: 24 August 2026 (aged 70) Tricio, Spain
- Party: PSOE
- Occupation: Civil servant

Carlos Sáenz de Santamaría Alegría (3 March 1956 - 24 August 2026) was a Spanish politician. A member of the Spanish Socialist Workers' Party, he served as Minister of Finance of La Rioja from June to July 1983.

Sáenz de Santamaria died in Tricio on 24 August 2026.
