= Jarosław Stolicki =

Polish historian (1962–2026)

- Born: 1962
- Died: 4 August 2026 (aged 63–64)
- Citizenship: Polish
- Occupation: Historian

Jarosław Stolicki (1962 – 4 August 2026) was a Polish historian and academic who was a professor of the humanities and a professor at the Jagiellonian University.

== Life and career ==
In 1987 he graduated from the Institute of History of the Jagiellonian University. In 1992 he obtained doctorate upon thesis Egzulanci podolscy w życiu politycznym RP 1672–1699 supervised by Kazimierz Przyboś. In 2008 he obtained habilitation. In 2025 he obtained the title of professor.

Stolicki died on 4 August 2026.

== Works ==
- Wobec wolności i króla: działalność polityczna szlachty ruskiej, ukrainnej i wołyńskiej w latach 1673–1683. 2007. ISBN 9788388737688.
- Sejmiki województw ukrainnych podczas wygnania 1648–1700. 2023. ISBN 9788367497473.

=== Editions ===
- Akta sejmiku podolskiego in hostico 1672–1698. 2002. ISBN 8388385127.
