= Pramuan Rujanaseri =

Thai politician (1939–2026)

- ประมวล รุจนเสรี

Director-General of the Department of Provincial Administration
- In office 1 October 1997 – 30 September 1999
- Preceded by: Chanasak Yuwaboon
- Succeeded by: Parinya Nakchatri

Member of the House of Representatives of Thailand
- In office 6 February 2001 – 5 January 2005

Personal details
- Born: 21 March 1939 Mae Sariang district, Siam
- Died: 12 August 2026 (aged 87) Mueang Nonthaburi district, Thailand
- Party: Thai Rak Thai (2002–2006); Pracharaj (2006–2007)
- Education: Thammasat University (BA); National Institute of Development Administration (MPA)
- Occupation: Civil servant

Pramuan Rujanaseri (Thai: ประมวล รุจนเสรี; 21 March 1939 – 12 August 2026) was a Thai politician. A member of the Thai Rak Thai Party and the Pracharaj Party, he served as director-general of the Department of Provincial Administration from 1997 to 1999 and was a member of the House of Representatives from 2001 to 2005.

Rujanaseri died in Mueang Nonthaburi district on 12 August 2026, at the age of 87.
