= Mieczysław Szyszka =

Polish politician (1961–2026)

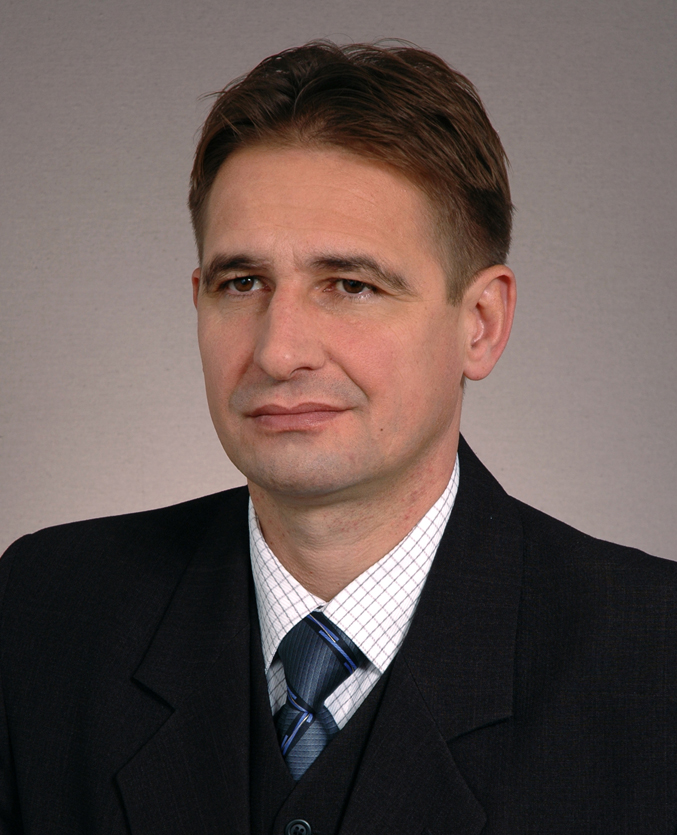
- Szyszka in 2005

Member of the Senate of Poland
- In office 19 October 2005 – 4 November 2007

Personal details
- Born: 8 December 1961 Nowa Ruda, Poland
- Died: 18 August 2026 (aged 64)
- Party: PiS
- Education: University of Physical Education in Wrocław
- Occupation: Teacher

Mieczysław Szyszka (8 December 1961 – 18 August 2026) was a Polish politician. A member of Law and Justice, he served in the Senate from 2005 to 2007.

Szyszka died on 18 August 2026, at the age of 64.
