= Cathy Pearsall-Stipek =

American politician (1932–2026)

Pierce County Auditor

Member of the Washington House of Representatives from the 29th district
- In office January 10, 1977 – January 8, 1979
- Preceded by: Mike Parker
- Succeeded by: Wendell B. Brown

Personal details
- Born: Cathy Pearsall; April 18, 1932 Tacoma, Washington, U.S.
- Died: August 7, 2026 (aged 94)
- Party: Democratic
- Education: Bates Technical College (certificate); University of Washington
- Occupation: Store owner

Cathy Pearsall-Stipek (née Pearsall; April 18, 1932 – August 7, 2026) was an American politician who served as a member of the Washington House of Representatives from 1977 to 1979. She represented Washington's 29th legislative district as a Democrat. Pearsall-Stipek served on several committees, including as vice-chair of the labor committee.

After leaving the legislature, she served in many other positions in local government, including the Tacoma School Board (1983–1989), Pierce County Council (1989–1993), Pierce County Auditor (1993–2002), on the Pierce County Charter Review Commission, and at the appointment of Governor Jay Inslee, on the board of Bates Technical College.

Outside the legislature, she was president of consulting and training business Votes Count, Inc. until retiring in 2015. Pearsall-Stipek also owned two other businesses, Custom Drapery Shop and Cathy's Custom Décor. She was married with six children. Pearsall-Stipek died on August 7, 2026, at the age of 94.
