= Maria-Luise Egerer =

Austrian politician (1945–2026)

Member of the Landtag of Lower Austria
- In office 7 June 1993 – 24 April 2003

Personal details
- Born: Maria-Luise Fuchs; 14 September 1945 Ober-Grafendorf, Lower Austria, Allied-occupied Austria
- Died: 5 August 2026 (aged 80)
- Party: ÖVP
- Occupation: Farmer

Maria-Luise Egerer (née Fuchs; 14 September 1945 – 5 August 2026) was an Austrian politician. A member of the Austrian People's Party, she served in the Landtag of Lower Austria from 1993 to 2003.

Egerer died on 5 August 2026, at the age of 80.
