= Alain Le Goff =

French storyteller (1942–2026)

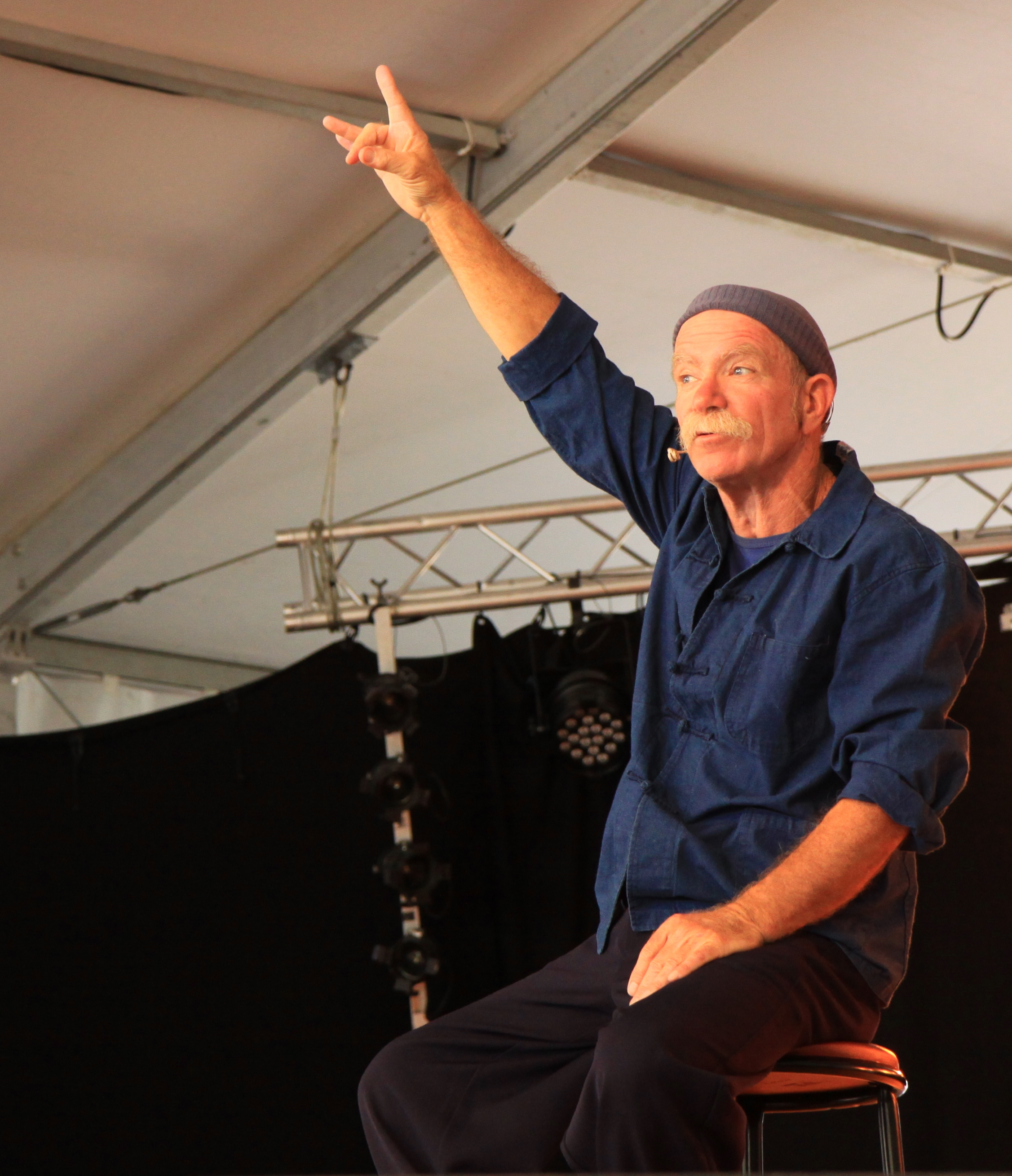
- Le Goff in 2010
- Born: 9 December 1942
- Died: 3 August 2026 (aged 83)
- Occupation: Storyteller

Alain Le Goff (French: [alˈɛ̃ lˈə- ɡˈɔf]; 9 December 1942 – 3 August 2026) was a French storyteller.

Le Goff was best-known for telling stories about the legends of Ys, Tristan and Iseult, and La Légende de la mort en Basse-Bretagne.

Le Goff died on 3 August 2026, at the age of 83.

== Books ==
- Le roi cheval et autres contes – Paroles de conteurs
- Le jeu cosmique
- Baleines, Baleines
