= Rajuddin Noeh =

Indonesian politician (1939–2026)

Member of the House of Representatives of Indonesia for West Sumatra
- In office 1 October 1997 – 30 September 1999

Personal details
- Born: 2 September 1939 West Pasaman Regency, Dutch East Indies
- Died: 24 August 2026 (aged 86) Padang, Indonesia
- Party: Golkar
- Education: Andalas University (LLB)
- Occupation: Civil servant

Rajuddin Noeh (2 September 1939 – 24 August 2026) was an Indonesian politician. A member of Golkar, he served in the House of Representatives from 1997 to 1999.

Noeh died in Padang on 24 August 2026, at the age of 86.
