= Itziar Alba Orbegozo =

Spanish politician (1942/1943–2026)

- Alba Orbegozo in 1990

Member of the Basque Parliament
- In office 15 March 1991 – 30 August 1994
- In office 30 November 1994 – 1 September 1998

Personal details
- Born: 1942 or 1943 Goizueta, Navarre, Spain
- Died: 17 August 2026 (aged 83)
- Party: PNV

Itziar Alba Orbegozo (1942 or 1943 – 17 August 2026) was a Spanish politician. A member of the Basque Nationalist Party, she served in the Basque Parliament from 1991 to 1998.

Alba Orbegozo died on 17 August 2026, at the age of 83.
