= Rashid al-Rajih =

Saudi politician (1944–2026)

- راشد الراجح

Member of the Consultative Assembly of Saudi Arabia
- In office 1995–2005

Personal details
- Born: 1944 Turubah, Saudi Arabia
- Died: 6 August 2026 (aged 81–82) Mecca, Saudi Arabia
- Resting place: Al Adl cemetery
- Education: Umm al-Qura University (BA); University of Cambridge (PhD)
- Occupation: Academic

Rashid al-Rajih (Arabic: راشد الراجح; 1944 – 6 August 2026) was a Saudi academic administrator, man of letters, and politician.

He founded the Department of Dawah, later known as the Department of Sharia and Islamic Studies, at his alma mater, Umm al-Qura University. He was also the chairman of the Makkah Literary Club.

He served on the Consultative Assembly from 1995 to 2005.

Al-Rajih died in Mecca on 6 August 2026.
