= 2026 in the Czech Republic =

- Decades: 2000s; 2010s; 2020s
- See also: Other events of 2026; History of the Czech lands • Years

Events in the year 2026 in the Czech Republic.

== Incumbents ==
- President – Petr Pavel
- Prime Minister – Andrej Babiš

== Events ==
=== January ===
- 1 January – Tomio Okamura, President of the Chamber of Deputies, posts a New Year address on social media, in which he speaks out against providing further weapons to Ukraine and admitting the country to the European Union, as well as criticizing the Ukrainian leadership. His speech is criticized by Ukraine's Ambassador to Prague Vasyl Zvarych and opposition parties, who call for Okamura's dismissal.
- 15–18 January – 2026 Women's EuroHockey Indoor Championship
- 15 January – The Babiš government survives a mandatory confidence motion following a 108-91 in the Chamber of Deputies.
- 17 January – Tomio Okamura, President of the Chamber of Deputies, orders the removal of the EU flag from his office, which was replaced by another Czech flag.
- 19 January – Two people are killed while six others are injured during a mass shooting at municipal office in Chřibská. The perpetrator commits suicide afterwards.
- 27 January – President Petr Pavel announces that he has received text messages from foreign minister Petr Macinka, which he perceives to be blackmail. He announces that he will consider criminal charges against him.

=== February ===
- 1 February – Thousands of people attended a demonstration to support President Pavel in his dispute with Petr Macinka on Prague's Old Town Square and Wenceslas Square, organized by political organization Milion chvilek pro demokracii.
- 2 February – Stanislav Přibyl succeeds Jan Graubner as Archbishop of Prague.
- 4 February – The Babiš government survives a no-confidence motion in the Chamber of Deputies filed over the Pavel-Macinka dispute.

=== March ===
- 5 March – The Chamber of Deputies votes 104-81 against a motion lifting parliamentary immunity for prime minister Babiš in a $2 million fraud case involving European Union subsidies.
- 6 March – The Czech Republic boycotts the opening ceremony of the 2026 Winter Paralympics in Italy in protest over Russian athletes being allowed to compete under the Russian flag after the lifting of sanctions imposed over the Russian invasion of Ukraine in 2022.
- 20 March – A suspected arson attack is carried out on a warehouse of the drone technology firm LPP Holding in Pardubice.
- 21 March – Between 200,000 and 250,000 people attended a demonstration in Letná Park in Prague to warned of democratic backsliding and called to defend public service media, organized by political organization Milion chvilek pro demokracii.
- 25–29 March – 2026 World Figure Skating Championships
- 26 March – A firebombing is carried out on a Russian cultural center in Prague.

=== April ===
- 18 April – The Dvorecký Bridge over the Vltava is opened in Prague.
- 22 April – Several thousand students nationwide attend a protest in response to a proposed law that would change the funding model of Czech Radio and Czech Television, organized by the "Hands off our Media" initiative.
- 28 April – A court in Brno sentences a man to seven years' imprisonment for an attempted arson attack on a synagogue in 2024.

=== May ===
- 3 May – 2026 Prague Marathon
- 4 May – The Prague municipal court convicts MEP Jana Nagyová of fraud involving EU subsidies and sentences her to a suspended three-year prison term and a fine of 500,000 koruna ($24,000).
- 5 May – Thousands of people attended a demonstration against a proposed law that would change the funding model of public media on Prague's Old Town Square, organized by political organization Milion chvilek pro demokracii.
- 24 May – Six thousand people attend a demonstration against the Sudetendeutsche Landsmannschaft congress on Brno's Dominikanske Square, organized by the political parties SPD and KSČM.

=== June ===
- 11 June–19 July – The Czech Republic participates at the 2026 FIFA World Cup.
- 22 June – Thousands of Czech Television and Czech Radio staff hold a one-day strike in protest against the government's plans to change the funding model of public media.
- 23 June – President Pavel files a competence lawsuit against the government over his exclusion from the Czech delegation to the 2026 Ankara NATO summit.
- 28 June – 2026 European heatwaves: The hottest day in Czech history is recorded in Doksany, at 41.9°C (107.4°F), beating the previous record of 40.4°C (104.7°F) in Dobřichovice in 2012. It also beats the record in Doksany the previous day, where it reached 40.9°C (105.6°F).

=== July ===
- 23 July – A Venom UH-1Y helicopter of the Czech Air Force crashes at an air base in Náměšť nad Oslavou, leaving one dead and four wounded.

=== August ===
- 21 August–6 September – 2026 Women's European Volleyball Championship in Azerbaijan, Czech Republic, Sweden and Turkey.

=== October ===
- 1 October – The Babiš government survives a mandatory confidence motion following a 94-83 in the Chamber of Deputies.
- 9–10 October – 2026 Czech Senate election (first round), 2026 Czech municipal elections and 2026 Prague municipal election.
- 15 October – The RKS Liblice 2 radio transmitter towers are demolished.
- 16–17 October – 2026 Czech Senate election (second round)
- 21 October – MEP and former leader of the Communist Party of Bohemia and Moravia, Kateřina Konečná announces that she had joined the Patriots for Europe group.
- 25 October – Thousands of people gather in Prague's Old Town Square to protest against plans to abolish television and radio licence fees and transfer them to the state budget. The demonstration is organized by political organization Milion chvilek pro demokracii.

=== November ===
- 3 November – Czech Radio and Czech Television staff hold a one-day strike against a government plan to transfer public-service media funding to the state budget and reduce their financial support.
- 5 November – Four passenger aircraft are searched upon landing in Prague after being subjected to bomb threats that are subsequently found to be false.
- 10 November – Hundreds of students from Prague universities gather at Náměstí Republiky in support of public service media.
- 15 November – Hundreds of thousands protest in Prague against a government plan to reduce a public media fee and shift funding to the state budget.
- 17 November – Two trains collide on a bridge in Prague, injuring 15 people.

=== Scheduled ===
- 3–20 December – 2026 European Women's Handball Championship in Czech Republic, Poland, Romania, Slovakia and Turkey.

== Holidays ==
- 1 January – New Year's Day
- 3 April – Good Friday
- 6 April – Easter Monday
- 1 May – Labour Day
- 8 May – Victory in Europe Day
- 5 July – St. Cyril and Methodius Day
- 6 July – Jan Hus
- 28 September – Czech Statehood Day
- 28 October – Independent Czechoslovak State Day
- 17 November – Freedom and Democracy Day
- 24 December – Christmas Eve
- 25 December – Christmas Day
- 26 December – Saint Stephen's Day

== Art and entertainment ==
- List of Czech submissions for the Academy Award for Best International Feature Film

== Deaths ==
=== January ===
- 4 January
  - Miloslav Masopust, 101, Czechoslovak Army general.
  - Miloslav Fiala, 97, Roman Catholic priest.
- 8 January – Václav Cigler, 96, sculptor and visual artist.
- 9 January – Jitka Gruntová, 80, politician.
- 10 January
  - Václav Klučka, 72, politician.
  - Ivan Štampach, 79, religionist and theologian.
- 11 January – Miroslava Pešíková, 79, ballet dancer.
- 21 January – Petr Krill, 84, politician.
- 22 January – Květoslava Kořínková, 85, politician.
- 23 January
  - Alena Kučerová, 90, printmaker.
  - Ota Zaremba, 68, weightlifter.

=== February ===
- 6 February – Jana Brejchová, 86, actress.
- 17 February – Jim Čert, 69, singer and accordionist.
- 20 February
  - František Mašlaň, 93, ice hockey player.
  - František Mezihorák, 88, politician.
- 23 February – Vladimír Liščák, 72, sinologist, researcher at the East Asia Department of the Oriental Institute of the Czech Academy of Sciences.

=== March ===
- 1 March – Lubomír Šik, 98, regional historian.
- 9 March – Leoš Šimánek, 79, traveler.
- 10 March – Zdeněk Hummel, 79, basketball player (USK Praha, Slovan Orbis Praha BK, Czechoslovakia national team) and coach.
- 16 March – Vladimír Stránský, 78, ice hockey player.
- 22 March – Božena Jirků, 78, journalist, editor and executive director of Charter 77 Foundation.
- 31 March – Petr Pleva, 66, politician, MP (1996–2010).

=== April ===
- 6 April – Vladislav Galgonek, 79, photographer and photojournalist.
- 8 April – Imrich Bugár, 70, discus thrower, Olympic silver medalist (1980).
- 10 April – Vojtěch Adam, 75, politician and surgeon, MP (2008–2017).
- 18 April – Karel Korytář, 76, politician, MP (2006–2008), senator (1996–2002, 2008–2014).

=== May ===
- 23 May – Toman Brod, 97, historian, anti-communist dissident, and Holocaust survivor.

=== June ===
- 6 June – Karel Tejkal, 88, radio journalist and publicist.
- 10 June
  - Zdena Mašínová Jr., 92, anti-communist political prisoner.
  - Jan Málek, 88, composer and music director.
- 10 June – Jaroslav Macháček, 96, academic and translator.
- 16 June – Jiří Wolf, 74, political prisoner and anti-communist activist, signatory of Charter 77.

=== July ===
- 5 July – Jiří Pták, 80, Olympic rower.
- 7 July – Jindřich Mikulec, 98, Olympic gymnast (1952).
- 15 July – Jaromír Liďák, 78, ski jumper.
- 16 July – Jaroslav Bánský, 46, mountaineer.
- 17 July – Bohumil Vacík, 73, serial killer. (death announced on this date)
- 18 July – Zdeněk Chovanec, 21, racing driver (FIA Formula 3).
- 19 July – Jaroslav Zvěřina, 83, psychiatrist, sexuologist and politician, MP (1996–2004) and MEP (2004–2009).
- 22 July – Vratislav Hlavatý, 91, artist, graphic designer and illustrator.
- 23 July – Pavel Jungwirth, 60, physical chemist.
- 26 July
  - Milan Knížák, 86, artist, musician and performer, rector of Academy of Fine Arts in Prague (1990–1997) and director of National Gallery Prague (1999–2011).
  - Vlasta Pavelcová, 94, ballerina.

=== August ===
- 1 August – Rom Kostřica, 77, otorhinolaryngologist and politician, deputy (2010–2013, 2013–2017).
- 10 August – Vladimír Páral, 94, fiction writer (Mladý muž a bílá velryba: Malý chemický epos).
- 21 August – Zdeněk Šesták, 100, composer.

=== September ===
- 3 September – Milan Ohnisko, 61, poet, editor and dissident, signatory of Charter 77.

=== October ===
- 11 October – Jiří Štěpnička, 79, actor (In the Shadow, Okres na severu, Pasáček z doliny).
- 15 October – Rudolf Křesťan, 83, writer, editor and feuilletonist.

=== November ===
- 2 November – Josef Mašín, 94, anti-communist resistance fighter and defector.
- 11 November – Oldřich Svojanovský, 80, rower.

== See also ==
- 2026 in the European Union
- 2026 in Europe
