= Jirků =

Jirků is a Czech surname. It was created by shortening the possessive pronoun Jirkův (meaning "Jirka's", from the pet form of the given name Jiří). It belongs to a small group of unusual Czech surnames that are unisex and do not decline. Notable people with the surname include:

- Andrea Jirků (born 1989), Czech speed skater
- Božena Jirků (1947–2026), Czech journalist and editor
- Ladislav Jirků (1946–2020), Czech academic and politician
