= Masopust =

Masopust (feminine Masopustová) is a Czech surname (meaning carnival); it may refer to:

- Masopust, the Slavic carnival
- Josef Masopust (1931–2015), Czech footballer
- Karel Masopust (1942–2019), Czech ice hockey player
- Lukáš Masopust (born 1993), Czech footballer
- Miloslav Masopust (1924–2026), Czech general
