= Yehuda Elkana =

Israeli philosopher

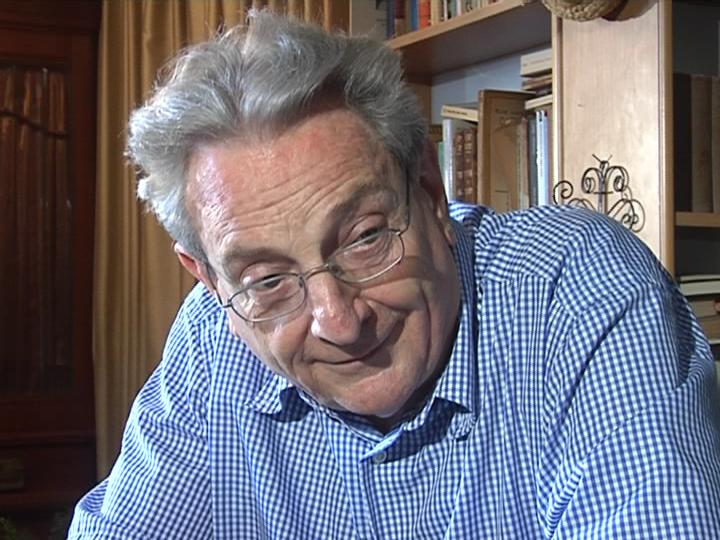
- Elkana in 2007

President and Rector of Central European University
- In office 1999–2009
- Preceded by: Josef Jařab
- Succeeded by: John Shattuck

Personal details
- Born: 16 June 1934 Subotica, Yugoslavia
- Died: 21 September 2012 (aged 78) Jerusalem, Israel
- Spouse: Yehudit Elkana
- Education: Hebrew University, Brandeis University

Yehuda Elkana (Hebrew: יהודה אלקנה; 16 June 1934 – 21 September 2012) was a historian and philosopher of science, and a former President and Rector of the Central European University in Budapest, Hungary.

== Life and career ==
Born in Yugoslavia, Elkana moved with his family to Szeged in 1944. That same year, Elkana and his parents were dispatched to Auschwitz. His family escaped the gas chambers when the Nazis transferred them to Austria as corvée labourers for the reconstruction of war-torn cities. In 1948, at the age of 14, he immigrated to Israel. He took up residence in Kibbutz HaZore'a, but health problems impeded Elkana from performing physical tasks. The kibbutz helped him acquire a scholarship to The Herzliya Hebrew Gymnasium in Tel Aviv. Soon after beginning his studies, Elkana decided he wished to be a philosopher and a historian of science. In 1955, he took up the study of mathematics and physics at the Hebrew University of Jerusalem. He taught at Gymnasia Rehavia while undertaking his Master's degree, which meant that it took him 11 years to complete it. He then obtained a Ph.D. from Brandeis University with a thesis on On the Emergence of the Energy Concept in 1968, which formed the basis for his book, The discovery of the conservation of energy (1974). After his Ph.D., he taught at Harvard University for a year. When he returned to the Hebrew University of Jerusalem, he was named chairman of the department of the history and philosophy of science, becoming in the meantime Director of the Van Leer Jerusalem Institute in 1968, a post he held until 1993.

He has taught at Harvard University, and has been a Fellow of the Center for Advanced Study in the Behavioral Sciences, Stanford University (1973–1974), a Visiting Fellow at All Souls College, Oxford (1977–1978), a visiting researcher at the Einstein Papers Project at Caltech and was Director of the Cohn Institute for the History and Philosophy of Science and Ideas at Tel Aviv University from 1981 to 1991. In 1985, he established the Interdisciplinary Program for Outstanding Students at Tel Aviv University. He led this special program for fostering excellence until 1994. From 1995 to 1999, he was a professor of Theory of Science at ETH Zurich. He was a permanent fellow at the Institute for Advanced Study, Berlin (Wissenschaftskolleg Berlin).

Elkana was a corresponding member of the International Academy for the History of Science as well as, since 1997, a member of the Science Board of Advisors of the Collegium Helveticum in Zürich. He was a co-founder and editor of the scientific journal Science in Context.

During his tenure at the Berlin Institute for Advanced Study in 2009/10, he began to work on a global initiative to reform undergraduate university curricula, to tackle the problems he outlined in earlier public appearances. This led to the establishment of the Curriculum Reform Forum. Until shortly before his death he worked with his co-author Hannes Klöpper on his last major work entitled: "Die Universität im 21. Jahrhundert: Für eine neue Einheit von Lehre, Forschung und Gesellschaft", which was published in October 2012. An English version is in the works.

== President of Central European University ==
In 1999, Elkana began his tenure as President and Rector of the Central European University, succeeding Josef Jarab. The third rector of the university in nine years, Elkana held the post until being replaced in August 2009 by John Shattuck. Early in his tenure, Elkana came under fire for his handling of the dismissal of the head of the Program for Gender and Culture and the firing of a part-time professor in that program. Describing himself as a "lifelong feminist", Elkana said that while he understood the furor over the incident, as he felt that women are often mistreated, his decision was sound. He oversaw the reorganization of the department of environmental sciences, halving the ratio of students to professors by both decreasing the number of students within the program and hiring additional professors. By the end of Elkana's term, the Department of Environmental Sciences and Policy had become one of the most successful Departments at CEU in terms of the number of applicants and external research funding.

During Elkana's term, five new Departments: Philosophy, Mathematics, Sociology and Social Anthropology, and Public Policy, as well as 15 research centers, including the Center for Cognitive Science (from 2010 the Department of Cognitive Science), the Center for Ethics and Law in Biomedicine (CELAB) and the Center for Policy Studies (CPS) were established at CEU. CEU received its institutional accreditation from the Middle States Commission on Higher Education and was legally recognized as a Hungarian University, which allowed it to participate in various European Union research and education programs. In particular, three prestigious Erasmus Mundus programs in Environmental Sciences, Policy and Management (2005), Public Policy (2006), and Gender Studies (2007) were launched at CEU.

Following his retirement in 2009, Elkana was granted the title of President and Rector Emeritus.

== Views on the Holocaust, Jewish Memory and Israel ==
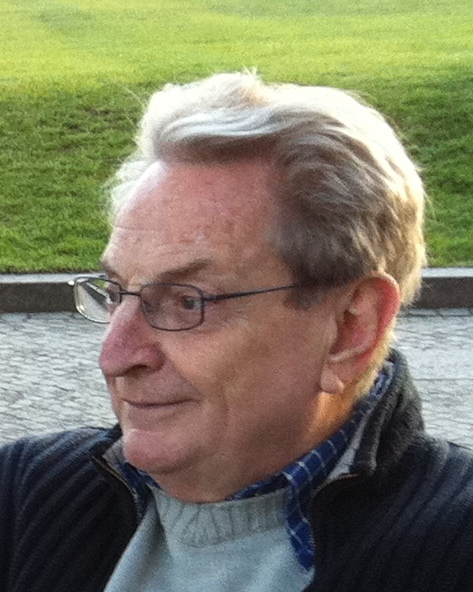
Yehuda Elkana, Berlin 2011

In 1988, in an article published in Haaretz, Elkana challenged the role of memories of the Holocaust, which he called 'the central axis of our national experience,' in Israeli identity. He criticized the custom of repeatedly taking schoolchildren to Yad Vashem. For Elkana, the Holocaust can happen to any people, and the message is universal. When "anomalous incidents" are reported, referring to things done to Palestinians, the initial reactions of his acquaintances, he claimed, were to deny such things happened or to dismiss them as symptomatic of a reciprocal hatred between Israelis and Palestinians. Elkana's own view is that:

There is no "anomalous incident" that I have not seen with my own eyes. I mean this literally: I was an eyewitness to incident after incident; I saw a bulldozer bury people alive, I saw a rioting mob tear away the life-support system from old people in the hospital, I saw soldiers breaking the arms of a civilian population, including children. For me, all this is not new. At the same time I do not generalize: I do not think that they all hate us; I do not think that all Jews hate the Arabs; I do not hate those responsible for the "anomalies" - but that does not mean that I condone their acts or that I do not expect them to be punished with the full severity of the law.

He confessed that his personal conviction was that:

the deepest political and social factor that motivates much of Israeli society in its relations with the Palestinians is not personal frustration, but rather a profound existential "Angst" fed by a particular interpretation of the lessons of the Holocaust and the readiness to believe that the whole world is against us, and that we are the eternal victim,

and in this sense had concluded that this was 'the tragic and paradoxical victory of Hitler.' For Elkana, 'any philosophy of life nurtured solely or mostly by the Holocaust leads to disastrous consequences,' and Thomas Jefferson was correct in his view that democracy and worship of the past were incompatible. While it may be the duty of the world to remember the Holocaust, he argued, 'we' must learn to forget, for the penetration of such memories deep within Israeli national consciousness, in his view, was the greatest threat to the state of Israel.

Delivering the opening address, 'Einstein's Legacy', for Germany's Einstein Year (2005), celebrating the centenary of Einstein's annus mirabilis, Yehuda remarked:

I love Israel and feel a deep loyalty towards it, and hope for its continued existence, and at the same time I warn against strong nationalist tendencies which may endanger the democratic character of the state (I never accepted that there can be such a thing as a genuinely democratic Jewish state, nor can any other religion-based state be fully democratic) ... when I publicly called for 'The need to forget', against the political manipulation of the Holocaust in Israel (by right-wing and left-wing governments equally), and at the same time I oppose tendencies by some in Germany who wish to 'close the chapter' of the Holocaust, I do not think that I am being inconsistent ... Israel should leave to the individual the memory he or she wishes to keep up or even to cultivate, while Germany must continuously, publicly, remember that this chapter can and should not be closed.

== Personal life ==
Elkana was married to Dr Yehudit Elkana. They had four children, including Amos Elkana (born 1967), composer, improviser, guitarist, and electronic musician.

== Works ==
- Elkana, Yehuda (1971), Boltzmann's scientific research programme and its alternatives, Hebrew University of Jerusalem, Van Leer Jerusalem Foundation
- Elkana, Yehuda (1971), Scientific and metaphysical problems : Euler and Kant
- Elkana, Yehuda (1973), The problem of knowledge in historical perspective, Hellenike Anthropistike Etaireia
- Elkana, Yehuda (1974), The discovery of the conservation of energy, with a foreword by I. Bernard Cohen, Hutchinson Educational
- Elkana, Yehuda (1981), "A Programmatic Attempt at an Anthropology of Knowledge", in Mendelsohn, Everett; Elkana, Yehuda (eds.), Sciences and cultures: anthropological and historical studies of the sciences, vol. 5, D.Reidel, pp. 1–68, ISBN 978-90-277-1234-9
- Elkana, Yehuda (1986), Anthropologie der Erkenntnis. Die Entwicklung des Wissens als episches Theater einer listigen Vernunft, Suhrkamp, ISBN 978-3-518-57940-4
- Elkana, Yehuda (1986), "Second-order thinking in classical Greece", in Eisenstadt, Shmuel Noah (ed.), Origins and diversity of axial age civilizations, State University of New York Press, pp. 40–64, ISBN 978-0-88706-094-6
- Elkana, Yehuda (1994), Essays on the Cognitive and Political Organization of Science, Max Planck-Institut für Wissenschaftsgeschichte
- Elkana, Yehuda (2002) [1984], "Transformations in realist philosophy of science from Victorian Baconism to the present day", in Mendelsohn, Everett (ed.), Transformation and Tradition in the Sciences: Essays in Honour of I.Bernard Cohen, Cambridge University Press, pp. 487–526, ISBN 0-521-52485-7
- Elkana, Yehuda (2008), "Einstein and God", in Galison, Peter; Holton, Gerald James; Schweber, Silvan S. (eds.), Einstein for the 21st century: his legacy in science, art, and modern culture, Princeton University Press, pp. 35–47, ISBN 978-0-691-13520-5
- Elkana, Yehuda; Krastev, Ivan; Macamo, Elisio, eds. (2002), Unraveling ties: from social cohesion to new practices of connectedness, Campus Verlag, pp. 7–25, ISBN 3-593-36846-3
- Elkana, Yehuda (2006), "Unmasking Uncertainties and Embracing Contradictions", in Golde, Chris M; Walker, George E. (eds.), Envisioning the Future of Doctoral Education, preparing stewards of the discipline, Carnegie essays on the doctorate, Jossey-Bass, pp. 65–96, ISBN 978-0-7879-8235-5
- Elkana, Yehuda; Klöpper, Hannes (2012), Die Universität im 21. Jahrhundert - Für eine neue Einheit von Lehre, Forschung und Gesellschaft, edition Körber-Stiftung, ISBN 978-3-89684-088-2
