= Vracov =

- Town
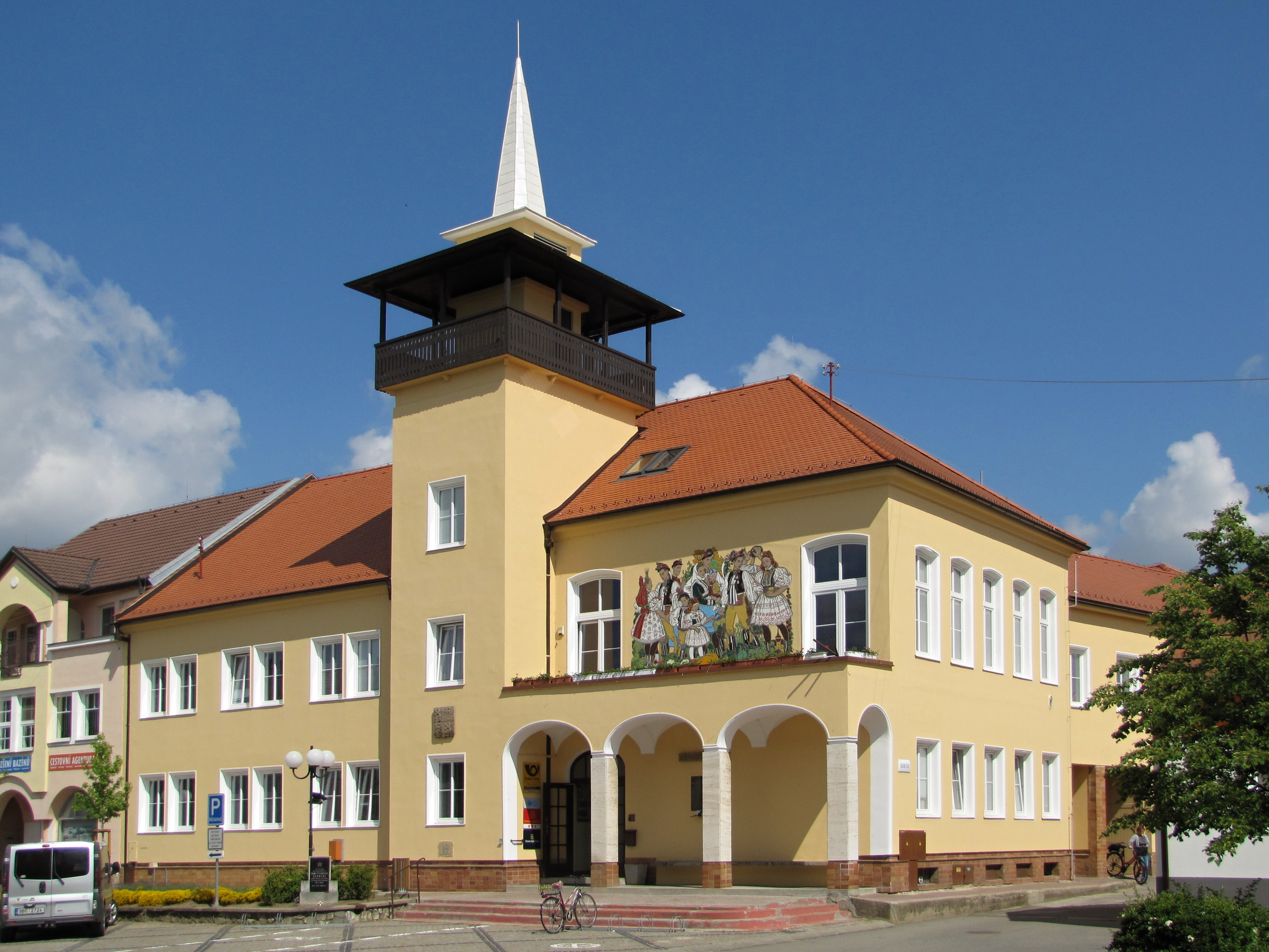
- Town hall

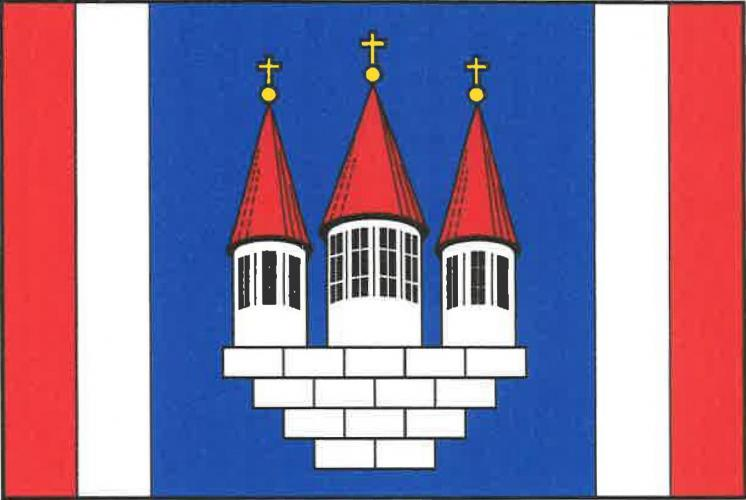
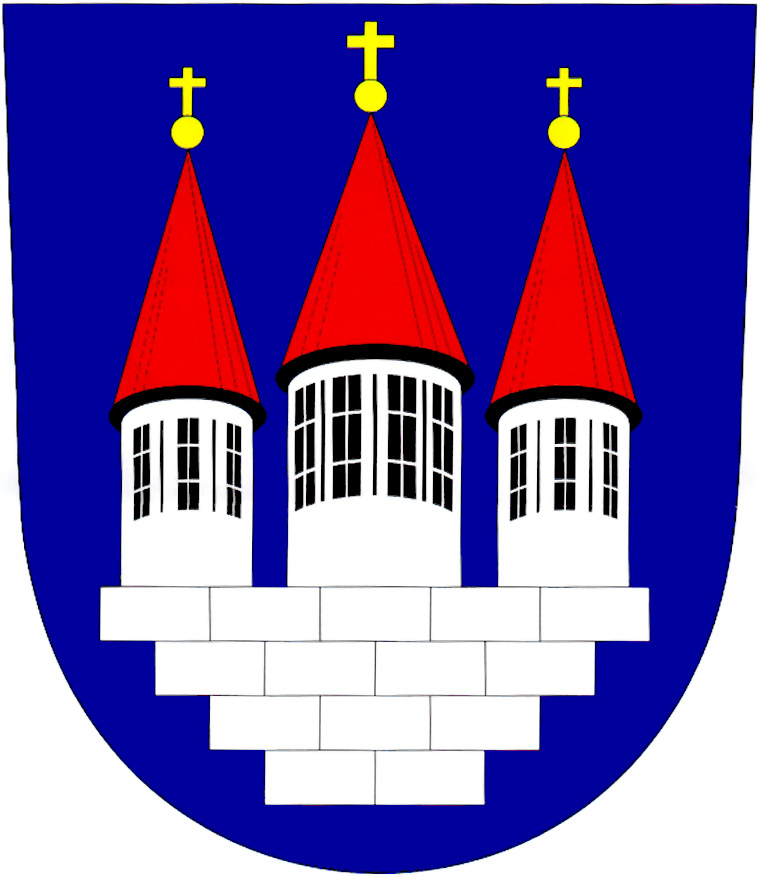
- Flag Coat of arms

- Location in the Czech Republic
- Coordinates: 48°58′31″N 17°12′40″E
- Country: Czech Republic
- Region: South Moravian
- District: Hodonín
- First mentioned: 1201

Government
  - Mayor: Petr Fridrich

Area
  - Total: 44.40 km^{2} (17.14 sq mi)
- Elevation: 183 m (600 ft)

Population (2026-01-01)
  - Total: 4,528
  - Density: 102.0/km^{2} (264.1/sq mi)
- Time zone: UTC+1 (CET)
  - Summer (DST): UTC+2 (CEST)
- Postal code: 696 42
- Website: www.mestovracov.cz

Vracov (Czech pronunciation: [ˈvratsof]) is a town in Hodonín District in the South Moravian Region of the Czech Republic. It has about 4,500 inhabitants. The town is located on the border between the Lower Morava Valley and Kyjov Hills.

== Etymology ==
The town's name is derived from the personal name Vrac, which is an obsolete diminutive of the name Vratislav.

== Geography ==
Vracov is located about 14 kilometres (9 mi) northeast of Hodonín. Larger part of the municipal territory lies in a flat landscape in the Lower Morava Valley. The northern hilly part lies in the Kyjov Hills and includes the highest point of Vracov, a nameless hill at 311 m (1,020 ft) above sea level.

The stream Vracovský potok originates here, supplies the fishpond Vracovský rybník on the western outskirts of the town, and the flows through the town proper. The Morava River briefly flows along the southern municipal border; the Velička River flows into the Morava in this section.

== History ==
The first written mention of Vracov is from 1201. In the 1230s, it was owned by Queen Constance of Hungary. Vracov was a royal property, but the development of neighbouring Bzenec reduced its importance. In 1310, Vracov became a part of the Bzenec estate and shared its owners since then. In 1517, Vracov was promoted to a market town. Vracov became a town in 1967.

== Demographics ==
Historical population

Year	Pop.	±%
1869	2,574	—
1880	2,999	+16.5%
1890	3,290	+9.7%
1900	3,487	+6.0%
1910	3,803	+9.1%

Year	Pop.	±%
1921	3,825	+0.6%
1930	3,907	+2.1%
1950	3,993	+2.2%
1961	4,335	+8.6%
1970	4,158	−4.1%

Year	Pop.	±%
1980	4,296	+3.3%
1991	4,384	+2.0%
2001	4,531	+3.4%
2011	4,484	−1.0%
2021	4,399	−1.9%

Source: Censuses

== Transport ==
Vracov is located on the railway lines Brno–Staré Město and Kyjov–Veselí nad Moravou.

== Sights ==
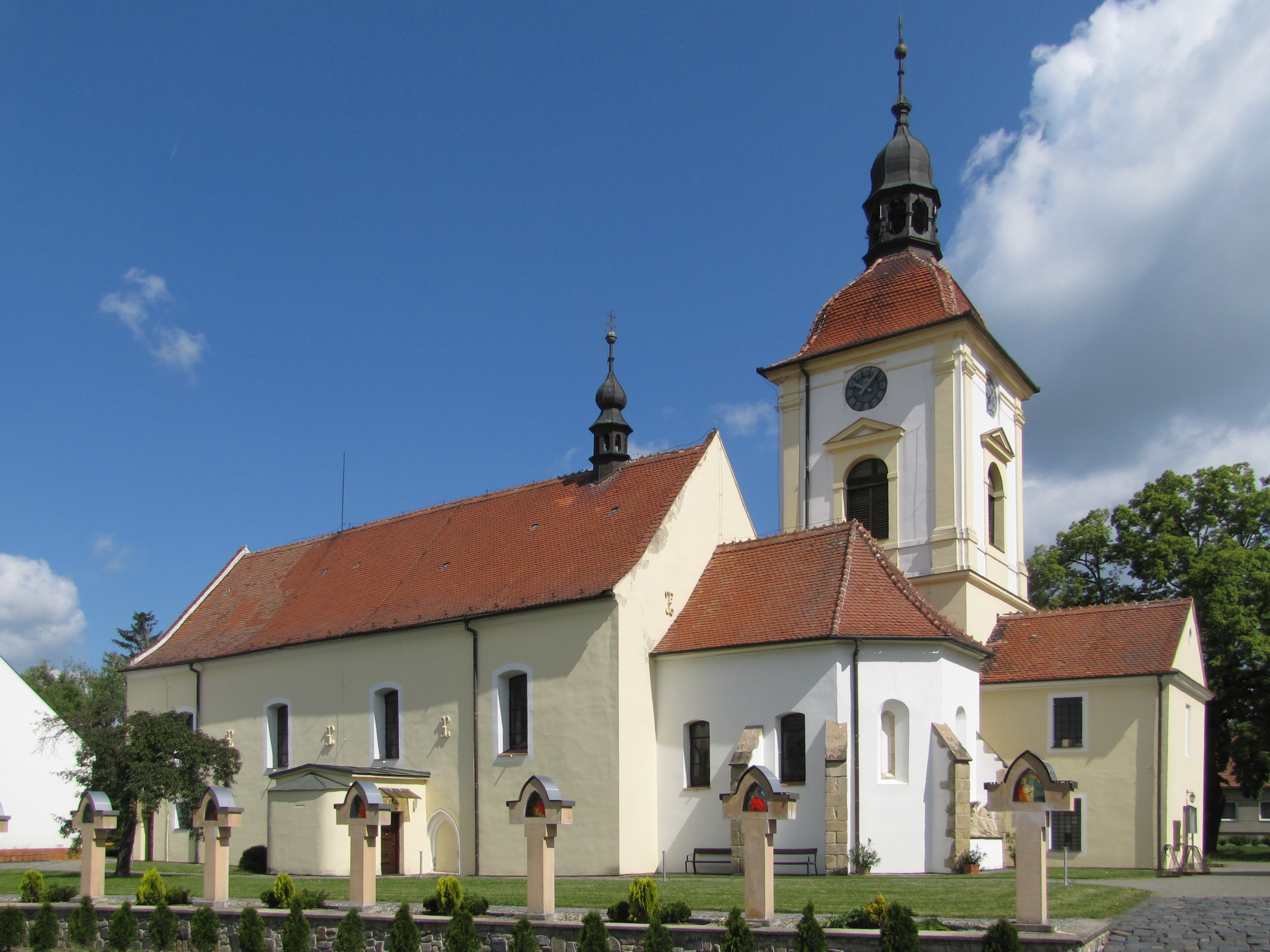
Church of Saint Lawrence

The main landmark of Vracov is the Church of Saint Lawrence. It was probably founded by Constance of Hungary in the 1230s. A Renaissance tower was added in 1565. The church was baroque rebuilt in 1722. Two valuable Baroque statues stand in front of the entrance – a statue of St. Florian from 1769 and a statue of St. John of Nepomuk from 1780.

The second cultural monument in the town is a small Neoclassical chapel dedicated to St. Anne. It dates from the first half of the 19th century.

== Notable people ==
- Jan Sládek (1907–1984), gymnast
- Josef Somr (1934–2022), actor
- František Mezihorák (1937–2026), politician
- Jan Dungel (born 1951), painter and illustrator
