= 2004 President of the Senate of the Czech Republic election =

- 15 December 2004
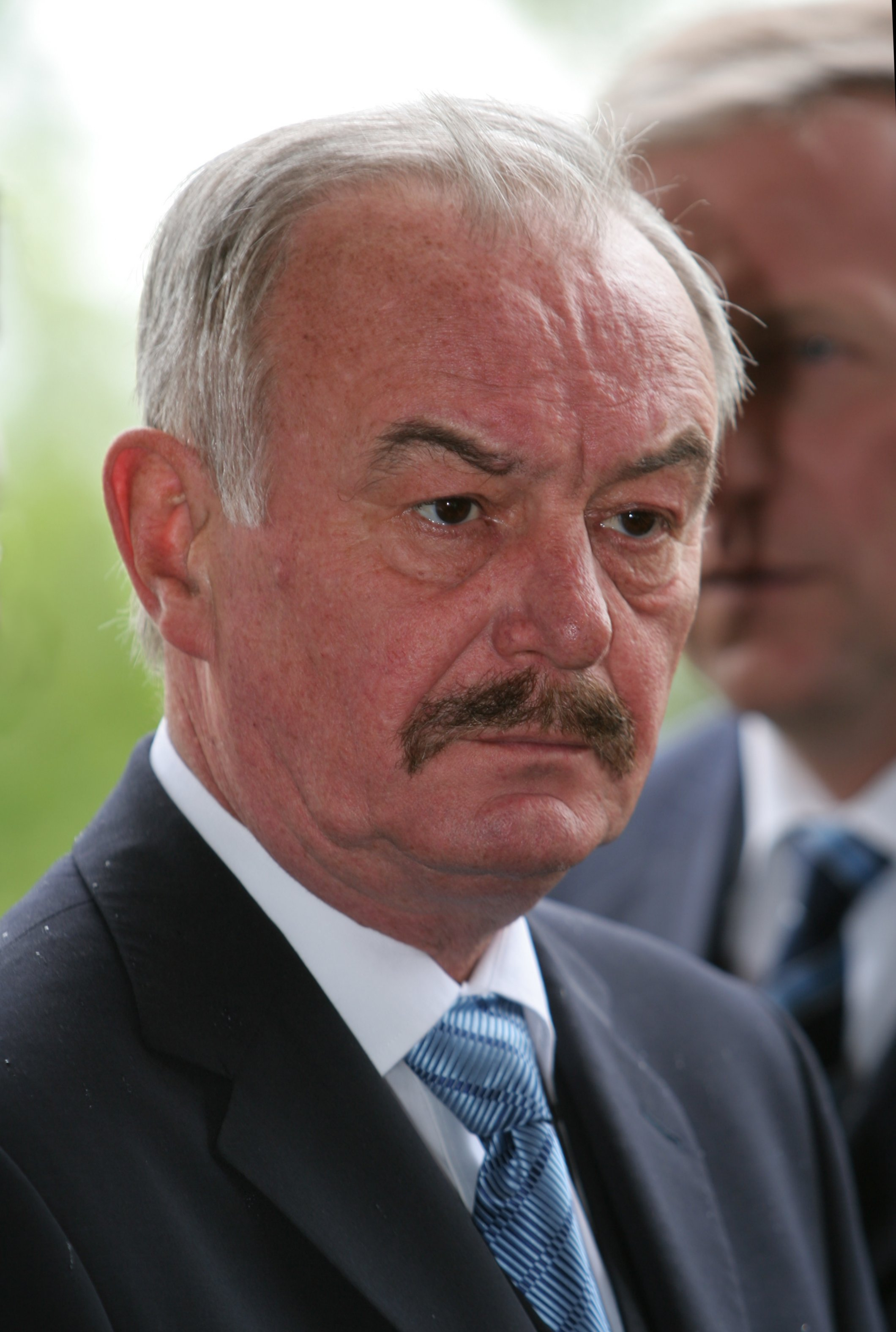

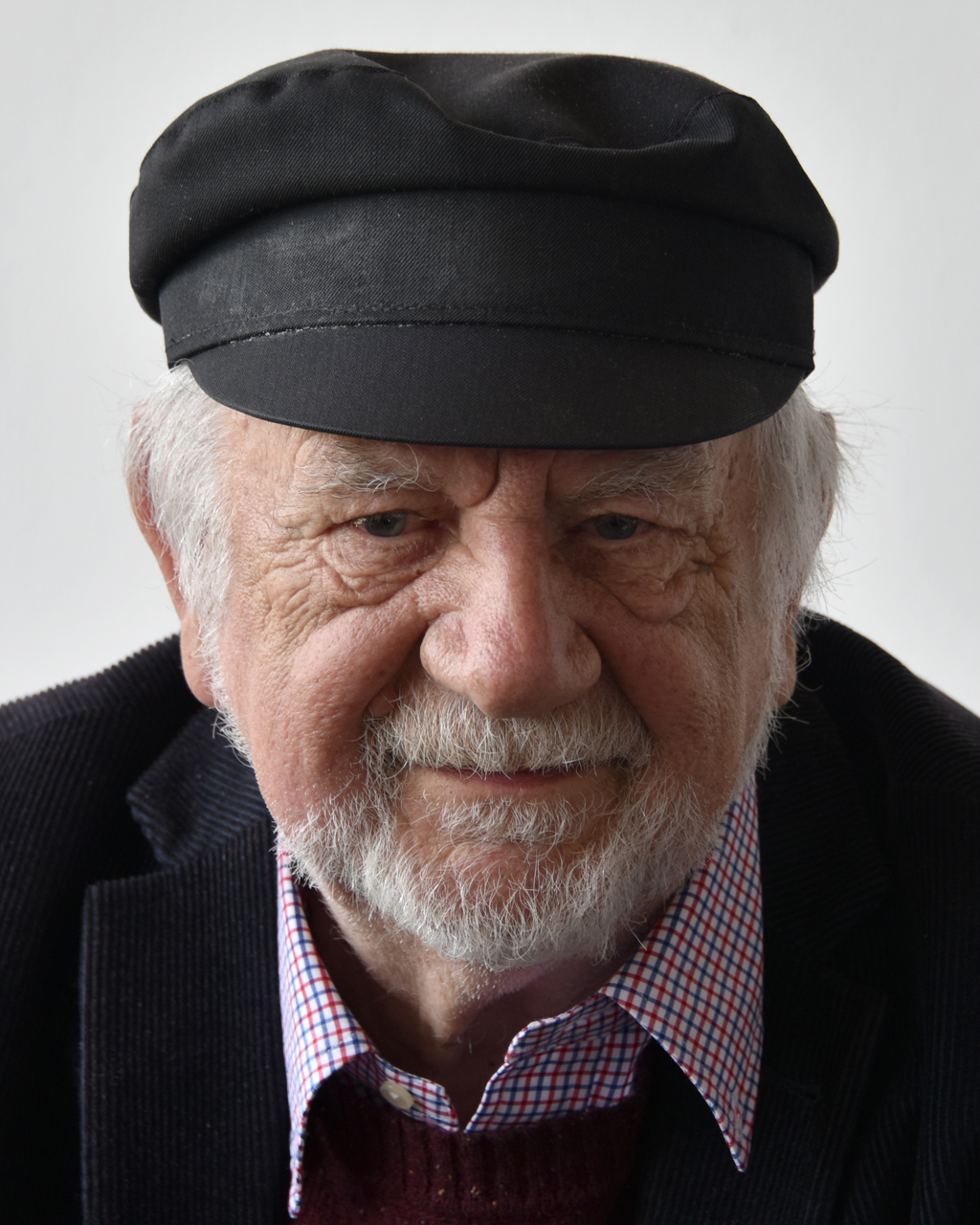
Candidate	Přemysl Sobotka	Josef Jařab
Party	ODS	Independent
Popular vote	55	22
Percentage	71.4%	28.6%
President before election
Petr Pithart
KDU–ČSL
Elected President
Přemysl Sobotka
ODS

Election of the President of the Senate of the Czech Republic was held on 15 December 2004. Přemysl Sobotka defeated Josef Jařab and became the new President of the Senate. The incumbent President Petr Pithart didn't run.

== Background and voting ==
After 2004 Senate election the Civic Democratic Party became the largest Senate party. It had 35 seats of 81. Petr Pithart who was a member of Christian and Democratic Union – Czechoslovak People's Party decided to not seek reelection. Civic Democrats nominated Přemysl Sobotka. Caucus for Open Democracy decided to nominate Josef Jařab for the position.

The election was held on 15 December 2004. Sobotka received 55 votes while Jařab only 22. Sobotka stated he wants to help the image of Senate as the new President. Jařab stated he believes that Sobotka will be a good President of Senate. It is believed Sobotka was supported by 35 Civic Democrats and also by some Social Democrats and Christian Democrats.

== Result ==
Candidate	Party	Votes	%
Přemysl Sobotka	Civic Democratic Party	55	68.75%
Josef Jařab	Independent	22	27.50%
None		2	2.50%
Invalid		1	1.25%
