= Hanzelka and Zikmund =

Czech adventurers

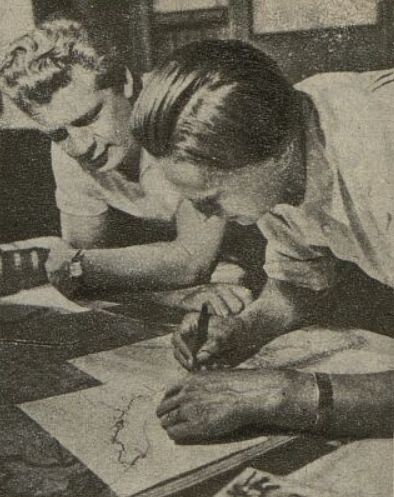
Jiří Hanzelka (left) and Miroslav Zikmund in 1956

Jiří Hanzelka (24 December 1920 – 15 February 2003) and Miroslav Zikmund (14 February 1919 – 1 December 2021), known collectively as Hanzelka and Zikmund, were a duo of Czech adventurers known for their travels in Africa, Asia, Latin America, and Oceania in the 1940s and 1950s, and for the books, articles, and films they created about their journeys.

== Early lives ==
Hanzelka was born on 24 December 1920 in Štramberk; Zikmund on 14 February 1919 in Plzeň. Both were deeply interested in foreign countries, nature, travel writing, and adventure stories from childhood onward. In 1938, both began post-secondary studies at the University College of Business in Prague, met, and became good friends. Their studies were delayed when the school was closed during the German occupation of Czechoslovakia, forcing their graduation to be postponed until 1946.

While at school, they discovered each other's love of travel and developed what they called the "5" project, referring to the five continents they hoped to visit. While waiting to graduate, they made detailed plans for travel, copying maps and studying their destinations from historical, meteorological, economic, and social perspectives. Both took university Russian lessons, but also studied to prepare for international travel: Hanzelka spoke German and French and studied Swahili, and Zikmund spoke English, studied Arabic, and had a basic understanding of Italian and Dutch.

== Travels ==
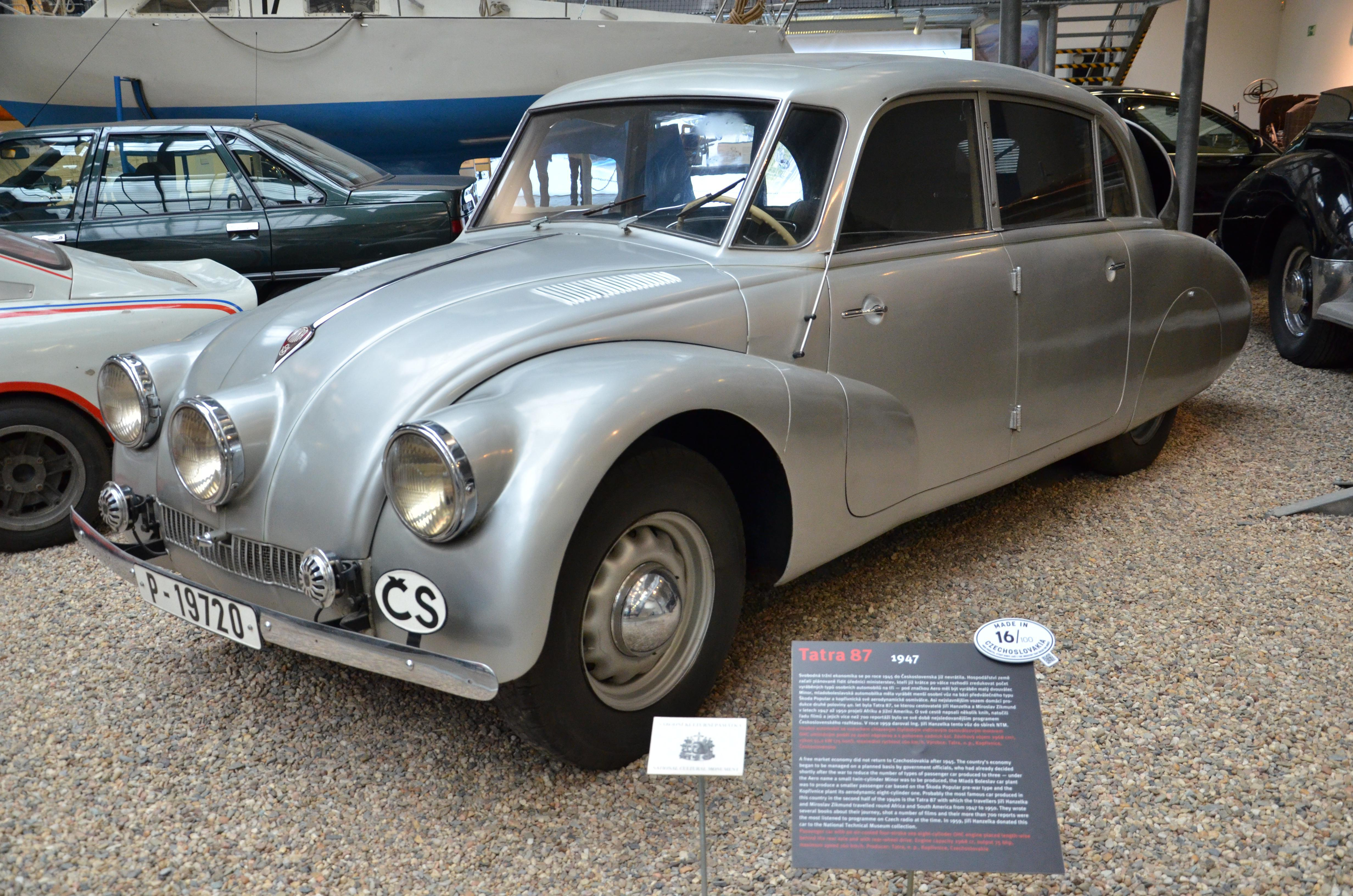
The Tatra 87 used by Hanzelka and Zikmund, exhibited at National Technical Museum in Prague

In 1947, Hanzelka and Zikmund pitched the "5" project to the automotive company Tatra. The company, impressed by the plan and seizing the opportunity to promote its vehicles, decided to sponsor the trip, and gave them a silver Tatra 87. After three months of gaining experience with the car at the Tatra factory in Kopřivnice, the duo set out on their first trip. It was a continuous three-and-a-half-year voyage through Africa and Latin America, from April 1947 to November 1950 and covering 44 countries and 111,000 kilometers.

Having traveled from the north coast of Africa to Mexico, the duo returned home, but their country had greatly changed during their absence. The 1948 Czechoslovak coup d'état resulted in a change of government and public life. Initially, the government treated Hanzelka and Zikmund well; though most Czechs and Slovaks were barred from going abroad, the duo were allowed to publish the fruits of their travels because their descriptions were not seen as politically threatening. They were able to launch a second trip, running five and a half years continuously from 1959 to 1964, taking them to Eastern Europe, Asia, and various Pacific islands with two prototypes of the Tatra 805 truck. On this trip, the duo reported on Indonesia, Irian Jaya, Japan, and the Soviet Union.

Throughout their travels, both captured still photographs and films as well as writing articles. In addition, they wrote a weekly radio program about their travels for Czechoslovak Radio, which became one of the most popular on the station; since they lacked the means to broadcast from the locations, they simply wrote the scripts and sent them back to Czechoslovakia, where their voices were recreated by two actors. Their works of travel literature include eleven full-length books full of photographs and descriptions of the economic and socio-political situations of the places they visited, four picture books, three children's books, and 150 short travel documentary films. Their books were also serialized in the newspaper Mladá fronta.

In Czechoslovakia, where the tight control of the Communist government made it impossible for most Czechs and Slovaks to travel out of the country, the works of Hanzelka and Zikmund offered a rare chance for vicarious escape into exotic climes. They became the best-selling writers of twentieth-century Eastern Europe; their books sold 6,525,000 copies in the Soviet Bloc and were translated into eleven languages. They became a national institution in the Czech lands, and were equally popular in Soviet Union, where the premier Nikita Khrushchev demanded of his aides that the three volumes of Hanzelka and Zikmund's Africa: Dreams and Reality be on his bedside table no matter where he went. Hanzelka and Zikmund visited 83 countries in total.

== Banning and aftermath ==
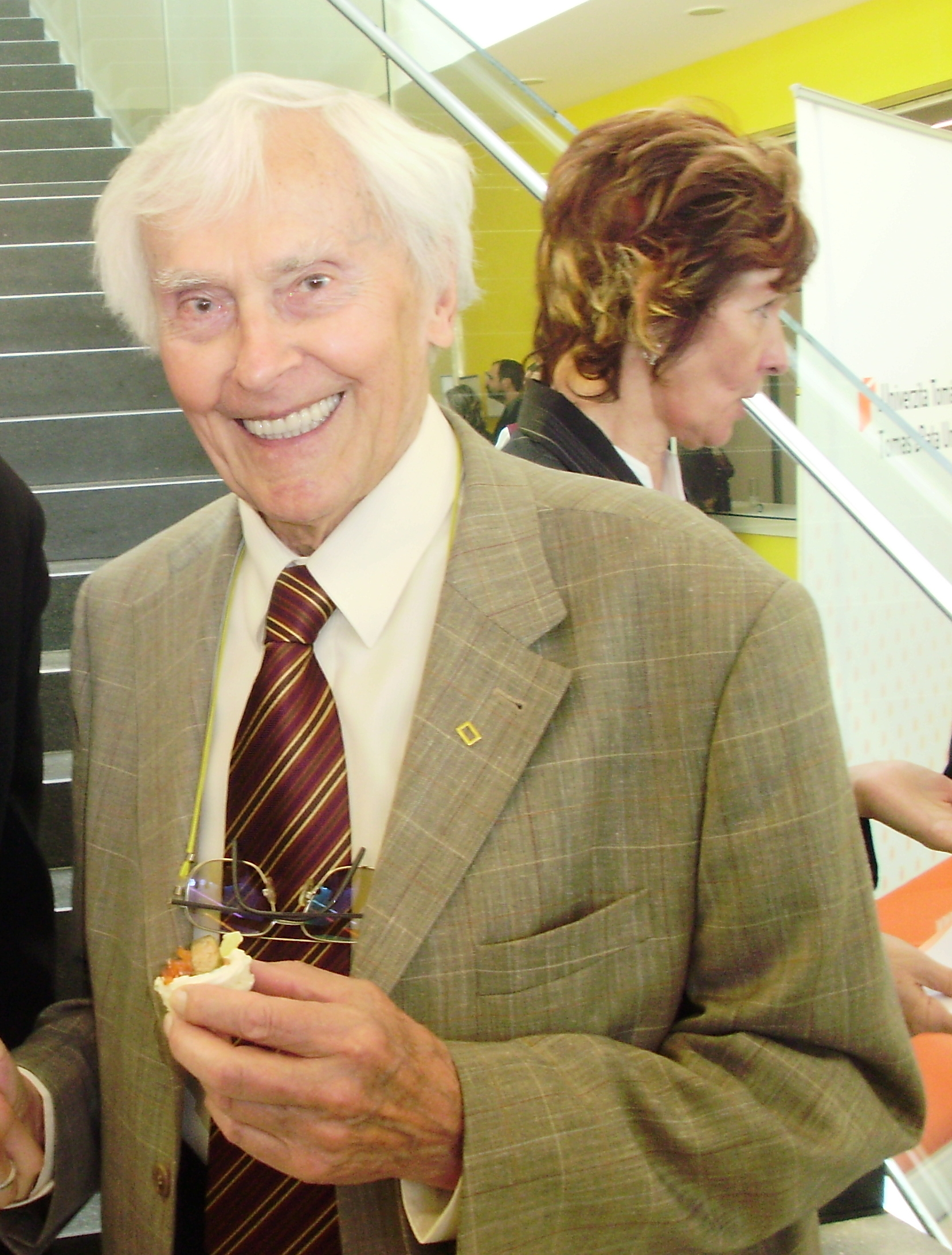
Zikmund in 2009

Hanzelka and Zikmund had initially planned to travel around the world, but they ran afoul of the Soviet premier Leonid Brezhnev in May 1965, when, as part of their second trip, they delivered a detailed and critical report of the poverty and political corruption they saw in the Soviet Union in 1963 and 1964. The Czechoslovak government, still under Soviet control, blacklisted the duo for the report. They were banned by the government from publishing, but went on writing in samizdat. They got into further trouble with the government for their anti-Communist activities during the Prague Spring in 1968 and for Hanzelka's signing of Charter 77. Their last book, Ceylon: Paradise Without Angels, was in preparation with the state-owned printer and had already received 120,000 advance orders when it was banned.

Hanzelka and Zikmund shared the fate of other Czechoslovak dissidents in the post-Prague Spring era, living meagerly for 21 years in menial jobs until the Velvet Revolution in 1989. Hanzelka was one of the dissident speakers at Wenceslas Square when the revolution began on 19 November. With the fall of the Communist government, Hanzelka and Zikmund were again acclaimed as heroes, with extensive interviews and rebroadcasts of their films. Life of Dreams and Reality, a new book about their travel experiences, was published on 22 April 1997, the fiftieth anniversary of the start of their first trip.

In 1992 Zikmund finally completed the around-the-world plan by visiting Australia. Hanzelka, though still active politically, was too ill to join him. He retired to a small farmhouse in the south of Bohemia, where he continued to write political criticism of government corruption, this time in the new atmosphere of free-market capitalism in the Czech Republic and Slovakia. Hanzelka died on 15 February 2003.

Miroslav Zikmund died on 1 December 2021 at the age of 102. He lived in Zlín, where a museum commemorates the duo's travels with a large archive of memorabilia, including travel journals, 700 newspaper articles, 120,000 photographs, 1,290 taped radio broadcasts, and souvenirs from around the world. In 2005, when an exhibition of 160 of their photographs was presented at the Old Royal Palace of the Prague Castle, Zikmund commented: "Jiří, my best friend in my life, he passed away two years ago, unfortunately. But I still live with him because every day something happens which is bound, is connected with his name. So actually we are still two."

Hanzelka and Zikmund remain well-known and well-regarded in the Czech Republic for their travels and works. The original Tatra 87 they used on their first trip was added to the Czech national cultural heritage list in 2005, and is on display at the National Technical Museum in Prague. In October 1999, President Václav Havel awarded both Hanzelka and Zikmund with the Medal of Merit. In October 2014, President Miloš Zeman awarded Zikmund with the Order of Tomáš Garrigue Masaryk. On the suggestion of the astronomer Jiří Grygar, the main-belt asteroid 10173 Hanzelkazikmund was named for the duo in 1995.

== Honours ==
- Medal of Merit (1999)

== Bibliography ==
- Afrika snů a skutečnosti, 1952
  - First English edition published in 1955 by Artia, Prague under the title "Africa: The Dream and the Reality".
- Tam za řekou je Argentina, 1956
- Přes Kordillery, 1957
- Velké vody Iguazú, 1957, select chapters from Tam za řekou je Argentina
- Za lovci lebek, 1958
  - First English edition published in 1963 by Artia, Prague under the title "Amazon Headhunters".
- Mezi dvěma oceány, 1959
- Obrácený půlměsíc, 1961
- Turkey, 1962, photo album
- Kurdistan, 1962, photo album
- Kashmir, 1962, photo album
- Syria, 1963, photo album
- Tisíc a dvě noci, 1967
- Světadíl pod Himalájem, 1969
- Zvláštní zpráva č. 4, written in 1964 not published until 1990
- Cejlon, ráj bez andělů, 1991
- Sumatra, naděje bez obrysů, 1991
- Život snů a skutečnosti, 1997
- Afrika kolem Tatry, 2000
- Přemožení pouště, 2002
