= Liščák =

Liščák (feminine: Liščáková) is a Slovak surname. Notable people with the surname include:

- Jozef Liščák (1947–2022), Slovak politician
- Róbert Liščák (born 1978), Slovak ice hockey player
- Vladimír Liščák (1954–2026), Czech sinologist
