= Jan Dungel =

Czech painter, graphic artist and illustrator

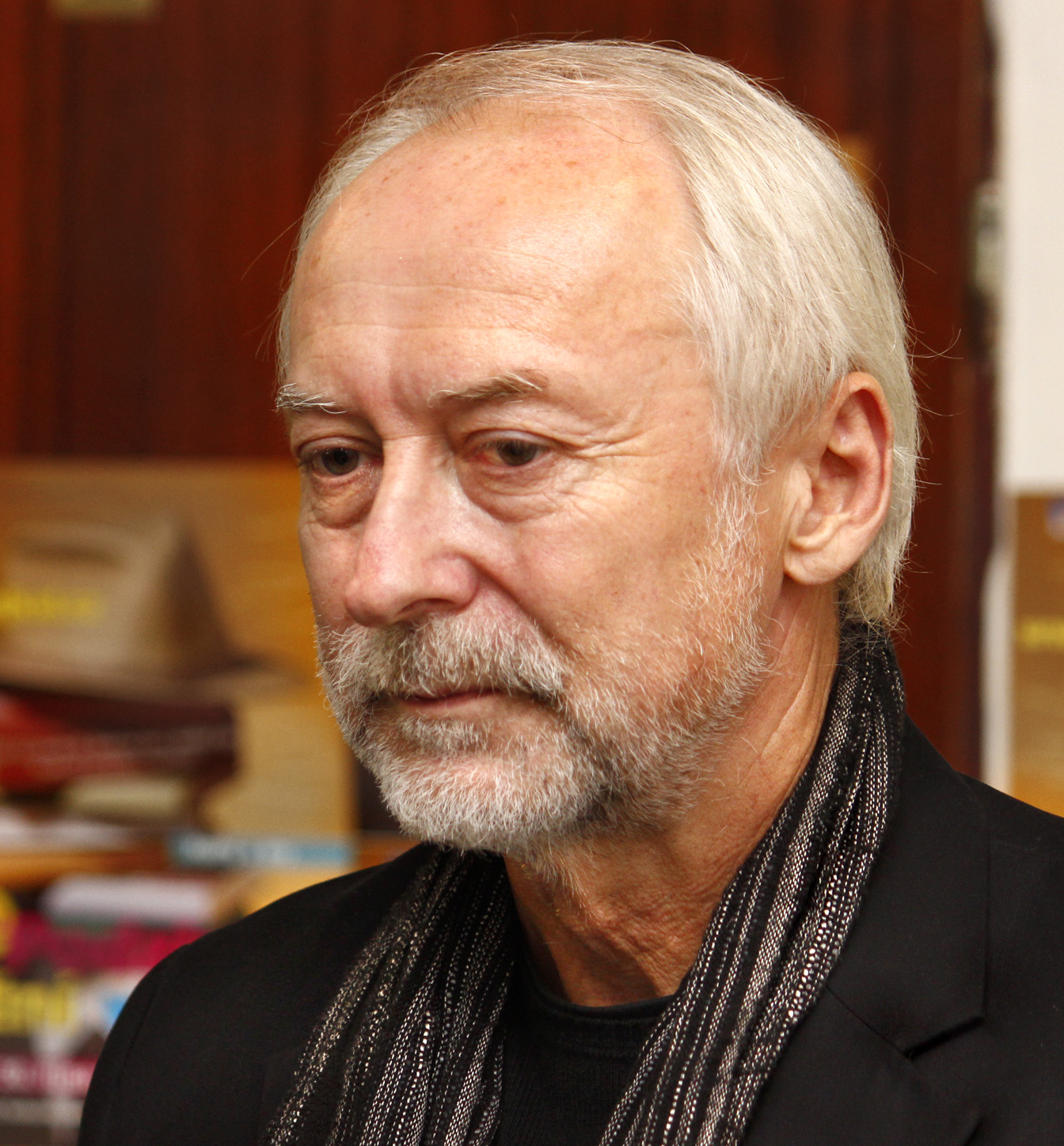
Jan Dungel in 2012

Jan Dungel (born 23 March 1951) is a Czech painter, graphic artist, illustrator and naturalist. A member of the Union of Visual Artists of the Czech Republic, he is especially noted for his paintings and drawings of animals. He has been painting and documenting birds in South America since 1992.

== Biography ==
Jan Dungel was born in Vracov. He repeatedly went on expeditions to South America in the years 1992–2019 – first to Venezuela, later to Ecuador.

== Books ==
- Pantanal and Llanos, Extrapublishing s.r.o. 2013, ISBN 978-80-905643-1-2
- Painting the Jungle, Academia 2006, ISBN 80-200-1474-8
- Deep in the Jungle (Po krk v pralese), Euromedia 2009, ISBN 978-80-242-2526-5 (English e-book only)

== See also ==
- List of Czech painters
