= Vratislav =

Vratislav is a Czech male given name. The name has its roots it the Slavic words vrátit ('return') and sláva ('glory'), meaning "the one who restores glory" or "the one who celebrates the return". Notable people with the surname include:

- Vratislaus I, Duke of Bohemia (Czech: Vratislav I.; c. 888 – 921), Bohemian prince
- Vratislaus II, Duke of Bohemia (Czech: Vratislav II.; c. 1032 – 1092), Bohemian prince
- Wratislaus of Brno (Czech: Vratislav Brněnský; ?–1156), Duke of Moravia
- Vratislav II of Pernštejn (1530–1582), Czech nobleman
- Vratislav Brabenec (born 1943), Czech poet and musician
- Vratislav Hugo Brunner (1886–1928) Czech typographer, artist and designer
- Vratislav Ducháček (1941–2018), Czech chemist and university professor
- Vratislav Effenberger (1923–1986), Czech literature theoretician
- Vratislav Greško (born 1973), Slovak footballer
- Vratislav Kulhánek (born 1943), Czech business manager and politician
- Vratislav Lokvenc (born 1973), Czech footballer
- Vratislav Mazák (1937–1987), Czech biologist
- Josef Vratislav Monse (1733–1793), Czech lawyer and historian
- Vratislav Petráček (1910–1987), Czech gymnast
- Vratislav Štěpánek (1930–2013), Czech Hussite bishop

== See also ==
- Wratislaw of Mitrovice, Bohemian noble family
