= Jaroslav Macháček =

Czech academic and translator (1929–2026)

Jaroslav Macháček (15 November 1929 – 10 June 2026) was a Czech academic and translator.

== Life and work ==
Macháček was born in Olomouc on 15 November 1929. He earned a doctorate at the Palacký University Olomouc in 1953, and began teaching at the university soon after. He specialized in English morphology, syntax, phonology, and historical grammar. He also co-edited the collected papers of Czech linguist Ivan Poldauf.

During the communist-era in the 1970s, he lost his teaching position for political reasons and was banned from academic work. He spent these years working as a boiler operator at the University Hospital.

After the fall of communism in 1989, he returned to the university at the request of his former student and then-rector, Josef Jařab. He served as Vice-Rector, helping to rebuild the university and regain its academic standing. He was awarded the City of Olomouc Prize in 1999.

Macháček died on 10 June 2026, at the age of 96.
