= Miroslav Zikmund =

Czech writer and explorer (1919–2021)

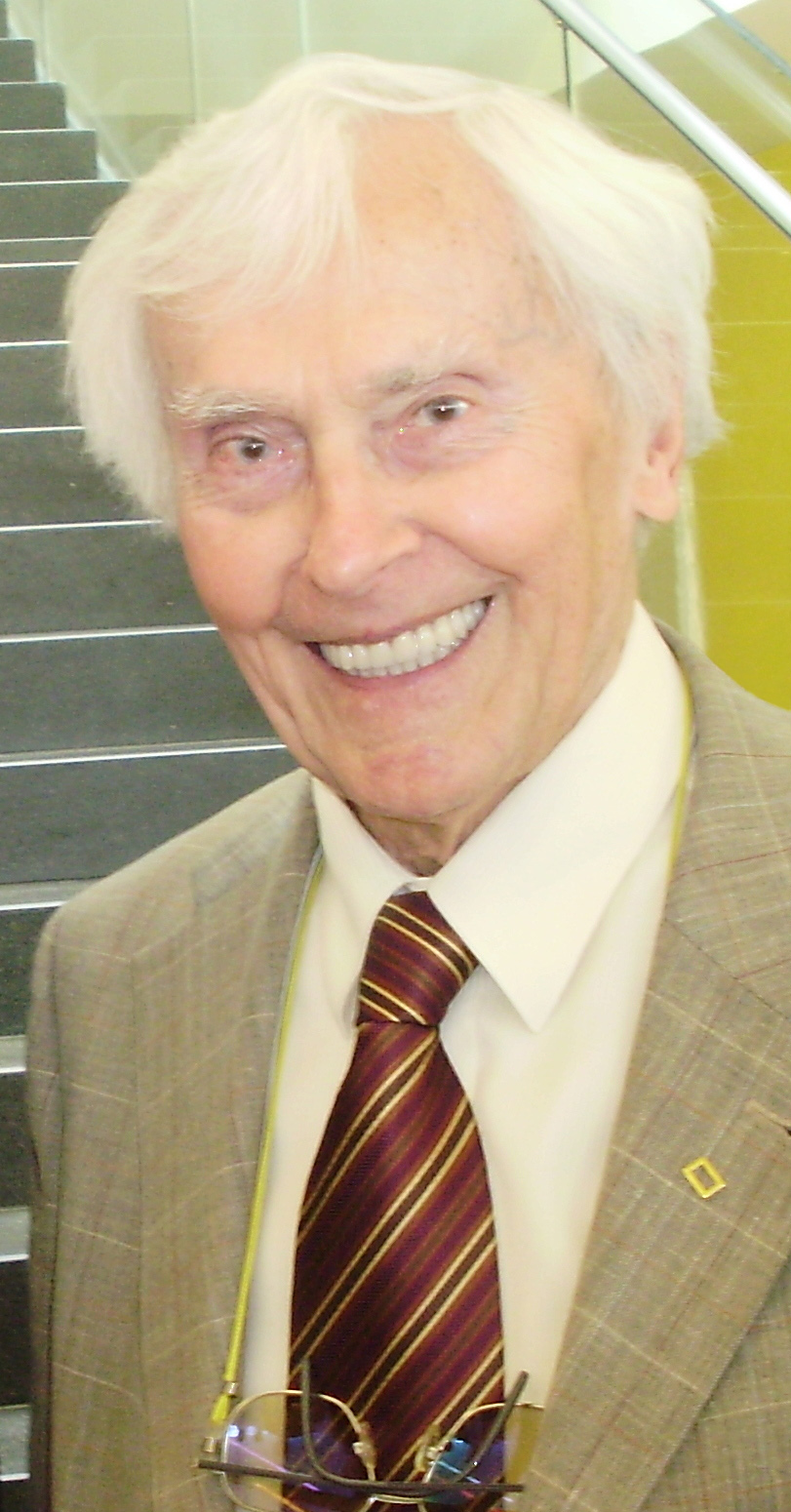
- Zikmund in 2009
- Born: 14 February 1919; Plzeň, Czechoslovakia
- Died: 1 December 2021 (aged 102); Prague, Czech Republic
- Occupations: Travel writer Explorer

Signature
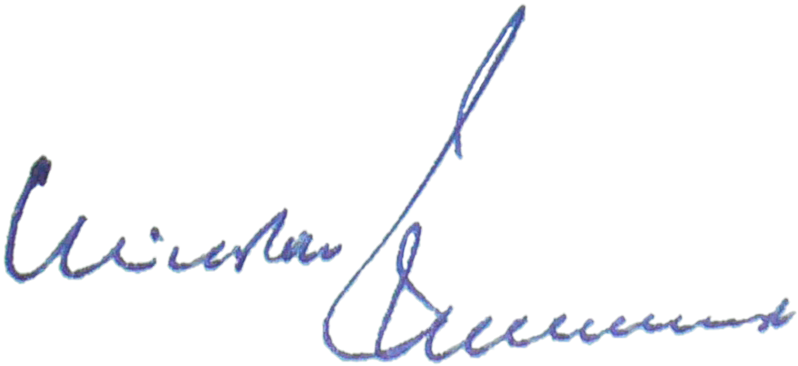

Miroslav Zikmund (14 February 1919 – 1 December 2021) was a Czech travel writer and explorer.

== Biography ==
After earning his Matura in 1938, Zikmund entered university, but was unable to graduate until 1946 due to World War II. He studied alongside Jiří Hanzelka, with whom he would complete his lifelong travels. The two became known as Hanzelka and Zikmund, and made multiple films on their experiences.

Miroslav Zikmund died in Prague on 1 December 2021 at the age of almost 103.

== Filmography ==
- Afrika I. – Z Maroka na Kilimandžáro (1952)
- Afrika II. – Od rovníku ke Stolové hoře (1953)
- Z Argentiny do Mexika (1953)
- Kašmír: Je-li kde na světě ráj (1961)
