= Miloslav Fiala =

Czech Roman Catholic Priest (1928–2026)

Miloslav Michael Fiala (28 August 1928 – 4 January 2026) was a Czech Roman Catholic priest.

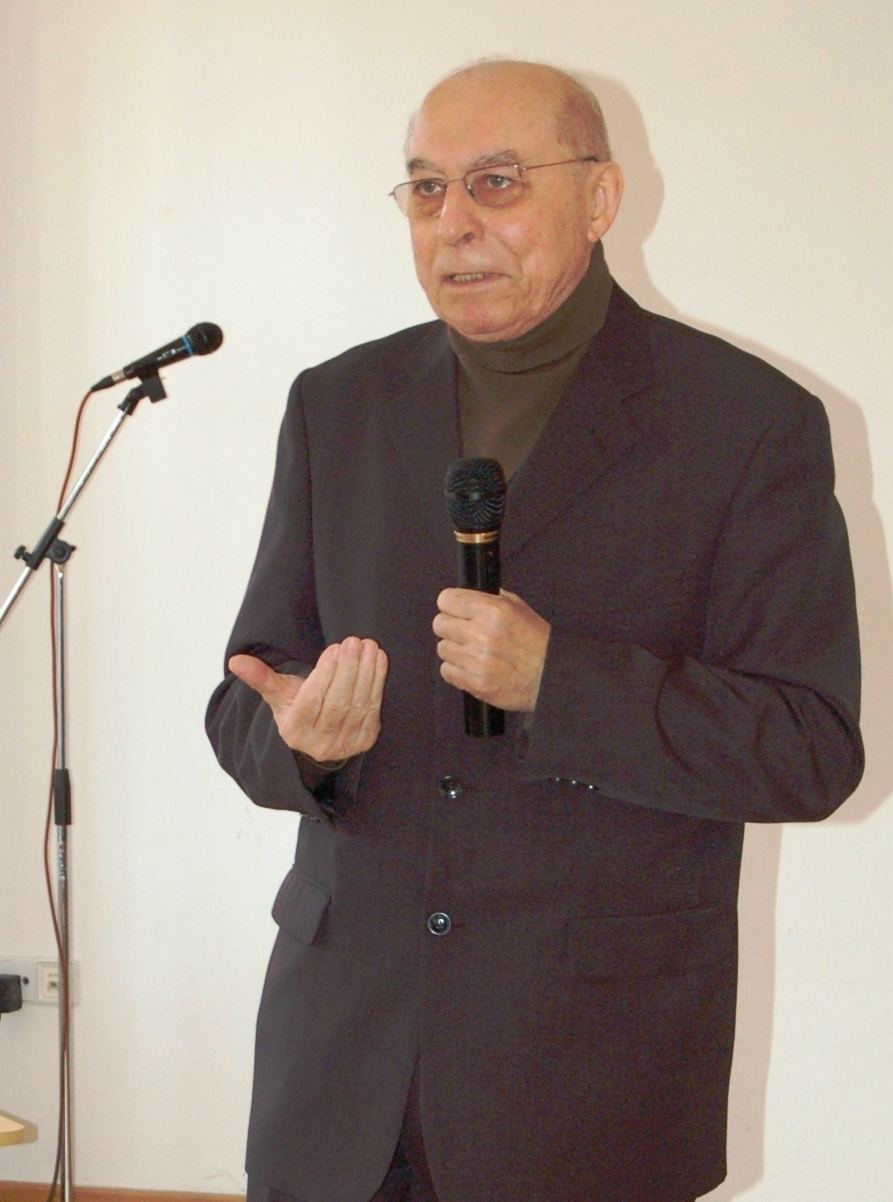
Miloslav Fiala

== Biography ==
Fiala was born in Kutná Hora on 28 August 1928. He graduated from the University of Business in Prague. During his studies in Prague, he was in contact with the Jesuits, but despite considerations of joining this order, they recommended for him to complete his studies in economics first. After completing his basic military service, he devoted himself to various civilian jobs, during which he secretly joined the Order of Premonstratensian Religious Canons and received minor ordination from Bohumil Vít Tajovský.

In 1958, he submitted an application to study at the Cyril and Methodius Faculty of Theology, but after an interrogation by State Security, he withdrew. It was only after the conditions were relaxed that he entered the seminary at the end of the 1960s. At the time of the Soviet invasion in 1968, he was with the Premonstratensians in Austria, but in the end he decided not to emigrate. After his priestly ordination, which he received on 21 December 1971, he worked in the spiritual administration in Hradec Králové until 1974, when his state approval to perform clerical activities was revoked. He continued to work as a warehouse worker and supplier during the construction of the Prague metro at Metrostav.

After the Velvet Revolution, he became the editor of religious programs of (later Czech Radio) on 1 January 1990; a selection of his reflections, broadcast under the title The Path of Hope and Faith since 1994 every Sunday morning on the Regina radio station, was published in two volumes. From 1 January 1991, he was at the same time the press spokesman of the Czechoslovak Bishops' Conference and the director of its press centre, which he founded. After the break-up of Czechoslovakia, he continued as a press spokesman for the Czech Bishops' Conference until 1996, and until 1998 also as the director of the press center of the Czech Bishops' Conference. From 1997 to 25 February 2004, he was the president of the Archdiocesan Caritas Prague and from January 1999 to the end of 2006 the president of the Czech Catholic Charity Association.

For his activities in the field of charity work, he was awarded the Order of St. Cyril and Methodius. He was also the spiritual director of the consecrated virgins of the Archdiocese of Prague, from this position he was released on 15 November 2008. However, he continued to help in the spiritual administration of Prague parishes, especially in the parish at the Church of the Sacred Heart of Our Lord in Vinohrady.

In 2022, he was awarded the Medal of Merit of the First Degree by President Miloš Zeman.

Fiala died on 4 January 2026, at the age of 97.
