= Vysočina Region =

Region of the Czech Republic

Vysočina Region Kraj Vysočina
- Region
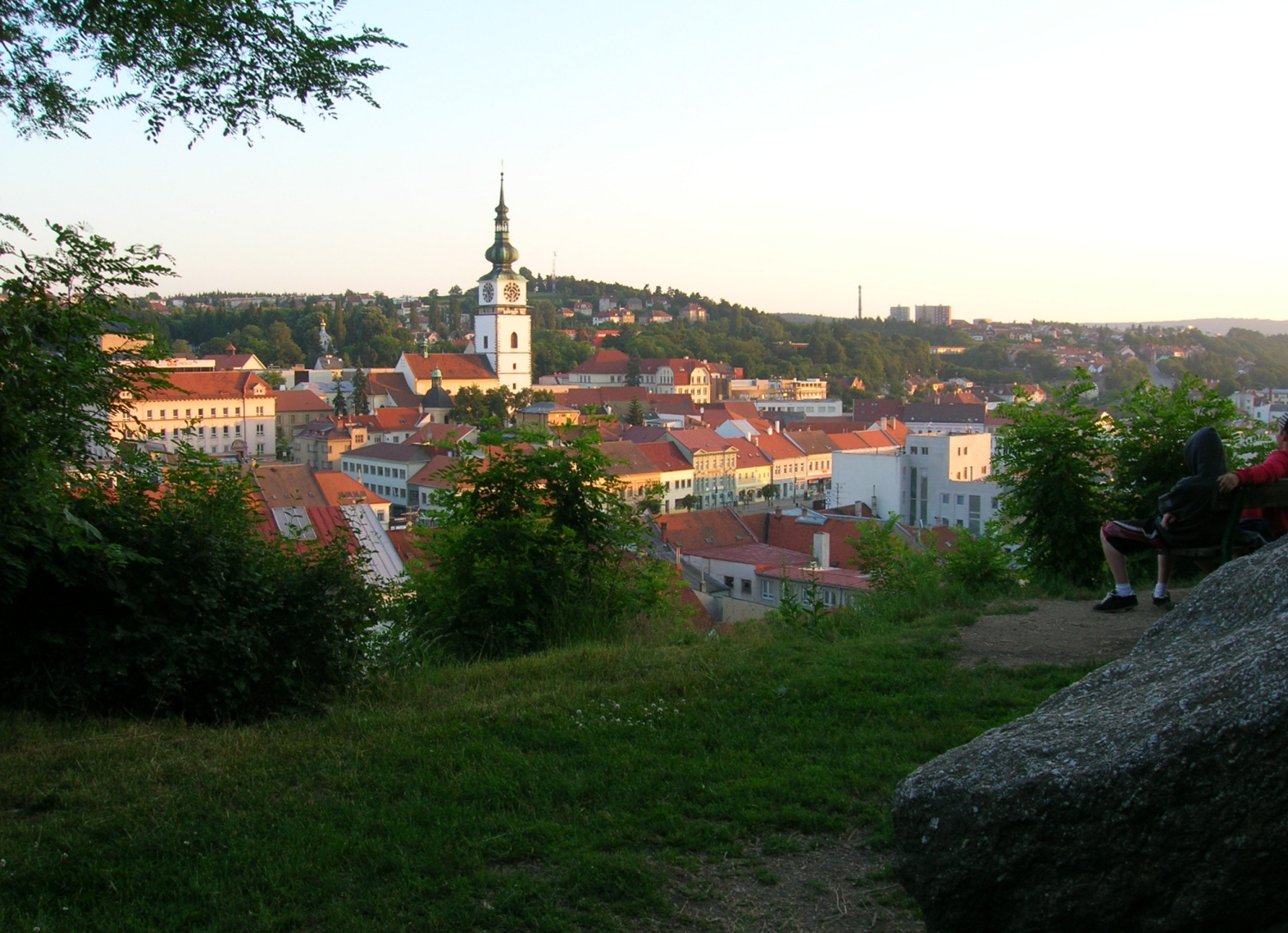

- Flag Coat of arms

- Coordinates: 49°35′22″N 15°39′20″E
- Country: Czech Republic
- Capital: Jihlava
- Districts: Havlíčkův Brod, Jihlava, Pelhřimov, Třebíč, Žďár nad Sázavou

Government
  - Governor: Martin Kukla (ANO)

Area
  - Total: 6,795.56 km^{2} (2,623.78 sq mi)
- Highest elevation: 837 m (2,746 ft)

Population (2024-01-01)
  - Total: 517,960
  - Density: 76.220/km^{2} (197.41/sq mi)

GDP
  - Total: CZK 234.709 billion (€9.154 billion)
- ISO 3166 code: CZ-63
- Vehicle registration: J
- Website: www.kr-vysocina.cz

The Vysočina Region (IPA: [ˈvɪsotʃɪna]; Czech: Kraj Vysočina) is an administrative unit (Czech: kraj) of the Czech Republic. Its capital is Jihlava.

The region is located in the central part of the country. It is one of just three in the country (the others being Prague and the Central Bohemian Region) which does not have a border with a foreign country.

The Vysočina Region is home to three UNESCO World Heritage Sites, the most in any region in the Czech Republic.

== Administrative divisions ==
The Vysočina Region is divided into 5 districts:

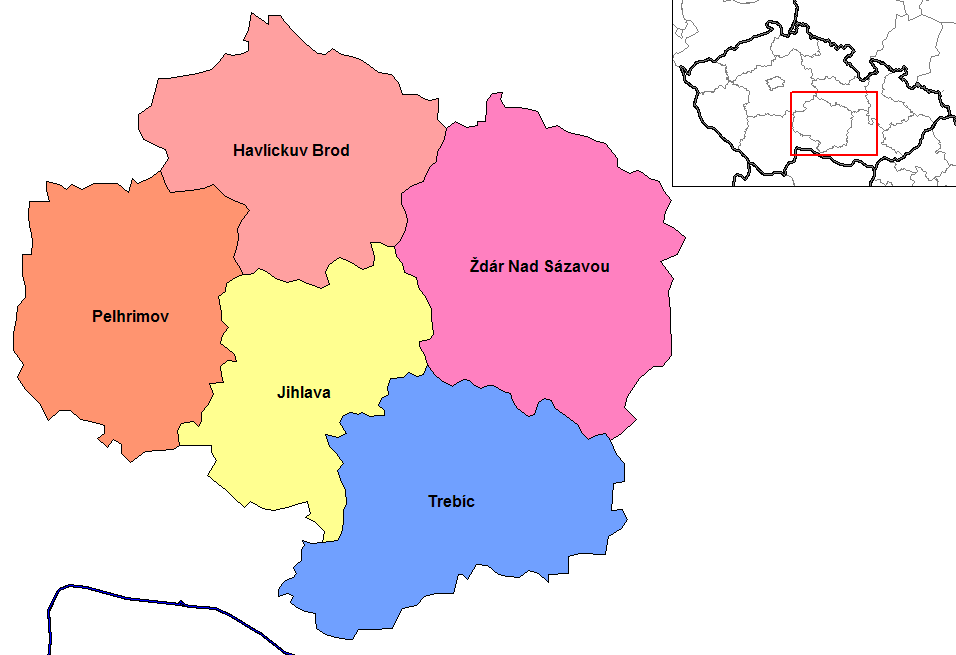
Districts of Vysočina Region

| Havlíčkův Brod; Jihlava | Pelhřimov; Třebíč | Žďár nad Sázavou |

On a lower level, the region has 704 municipalities, second-most in the country behind the Central Bohemian Region.

== Geography ==
The region is located in the central part of the Czech Republic, partly in the southeast of the historical region of Bohemia and partly in the southwest of the historical region of Moravia. The entire Vysočina Region is located in the nature region of Bohemian-Moravian Highlands, from whose colloquial name vysočina (meaning "the highlands") the region got its name. Within the country, the region has a relatively high altitude and is the source of many rivers. The most important rivers are the Sázava, Jihlava, Svratka and Oslava.

== Population ==
As of 1 January 2024 the population of the Vysočina Region was 517,960, which was the third lowest out of regions in the Czech Republic. 49.7% of population were men, which was the highest share in the Czech Republic. The density of Vysočina Region is the second lowest in the Czech Republic (75 inhabitants per km^{2}).

The table shows cities and towns in the region with the largest population (as of 1 January 2024):

| Name | Population | Area (km²) | District |
|---|---|---|---|
| Jihlava | 53,986 | 79 | Jihlava District |
| Třebíč | 34,797 | 58 | Třebíč District |
| Havlíčkův Brod | 23,746 | 65 | Havlíčkův Brod District |
| Žďár nad Sázavou | 20,525 | 37 | Žďár nad Sázavou District |
| Pelhřimov | 16,420 | 95 | Pelhřimov District |
| Velké Meziříčí | 11,627 | 41 | Žďár nad Sázavou District |
| Humpolec | 11,447 | 51 | Pelhřimov District |
| Nové Město na Moravě | 9,904 | 61 | Žďár nad Sázavou District |
| Chotěboř | 9,096 | 54 | Havlíčkův Brod District |
| Bystřice nad Pernštejnem | 7,896 | 53 | Žďár nad Sázavou District |

Historical population

| Year | Pop. | ±% |
|---|---|---|
| 1869 | 505,480 | — |
| 1880 | 522,573 | +3.4% |
| 1890 | 522,262 | −0.1% |
| 1900 | 524,563 | +0.4% |
| 1910 | 536,488 | +2.3% |

| Year | Pop. | ±% |
|---|---|---|
| 1921 | 531,703 | −0.9% |
| 1930 | 521,768 | −1.9% |
| 1950 | 452,628 | −13.3% |
| 1961 | 481,045 | +6.3% |
| 1970 | 486,571 | +1.1% |

| Year | Pop. | ±% |
|---|---|---|
| 1980 | 508,868 | +4.6% |
| 1991 | 513,740 | +1.0% |
| 2001 | 512,143 | −0.3% |
| 2011 | 505,565 | −1.3% |
| 2021 | 497,661 | −1.6% |

Source: Censuses

== Culture ==
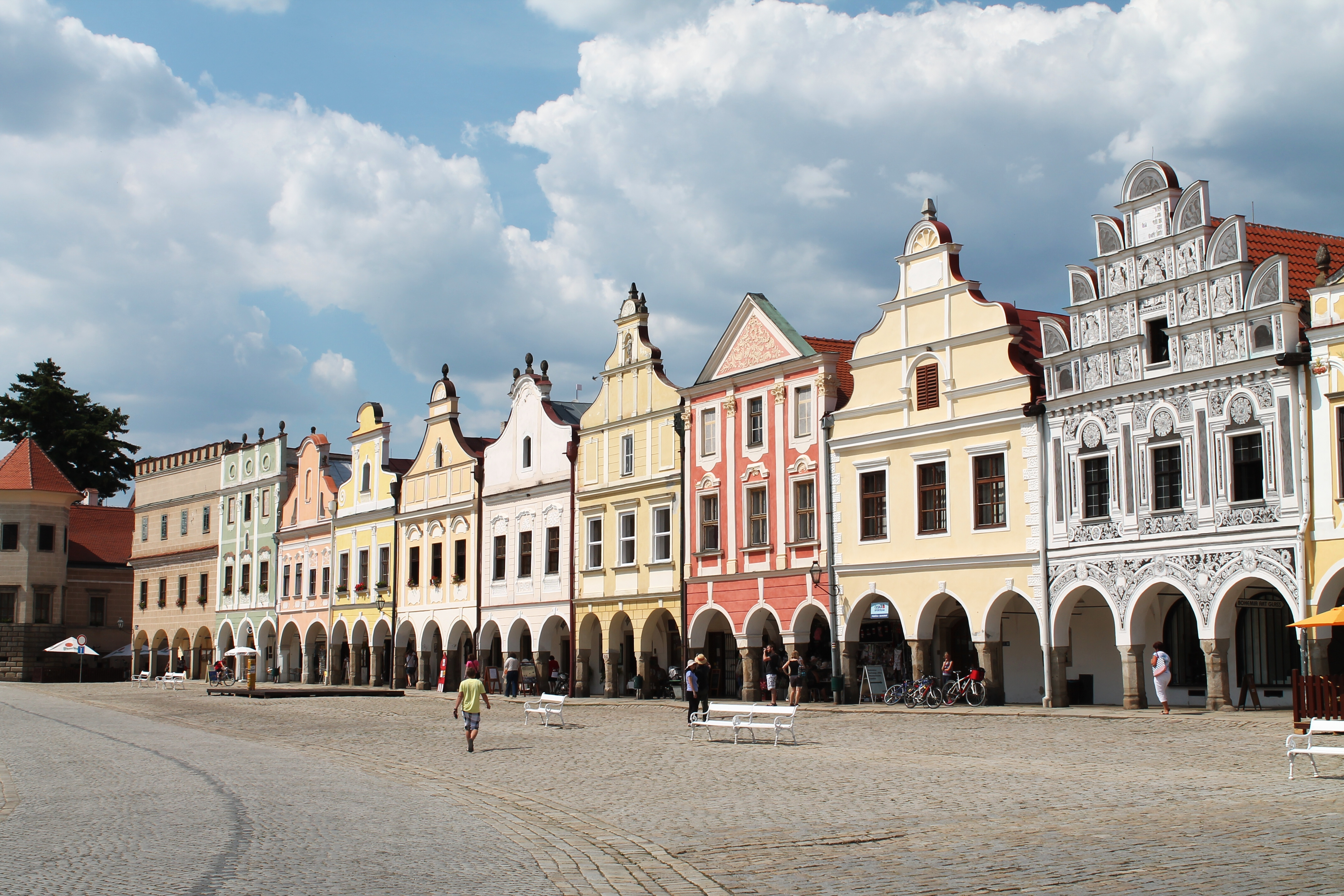
Main Square, Telč

With three UNESCO World Heritage Sites, the region is home to more of these than any other region of the Czech Republic. These are the historical centre of Telč, the Pilgrimage Church of Saint John of Nepomuk in Žďár nad Sázavou and the Jewish Quarter and St Procopius' Basilica in Třebíč.

== Transport ==
The Vysočina Region is intersected by the D1 motorway, which passes through Jihlava on the way between Prague and Brno. A total of 93 km (58 mi) of motorway is present in the region. The length of operated railway lines in the region is 622 km (386 mi). In 2014 a plan was announced by which a high-speed train, capable of reaching speeds of 350 km/h (220 mph) would run through the region, involving a total of four stops within the territory. Construction is projected to begin in 2025.

== Education ==
In the Vysočina Region there is only one organisation providing further education, namely the public College of Polytechnics Jihlava. From 2003 to 2019 there also used to be private Westmoravian College in Třebíč.
