= List of presidents and rectors of Central European University =

Below is a list of the presidents and rectors of Central European University in Vienna, Austria and Budapest, Hungary.

== Presidents and rectors ==
Years active	Duration	Name	Official title
1991-1993	2 years	William Newton-Smith	Chair of the Executive Committee
1993-1996	3 years	Alfred Stepan	President and Rector
1997-1999	2 years	Josef Jařab	President and Rector
1999-2009	10 years	Yehuda Elkana	President and Rector
2009-2016	7 years	John Shattuck	President and Rector
2016-2021	5 years	Michael Ignatieff	President and Rector
2021-2025	4 years	Shalini Randeria	President and Rector
2025-2026	1 year	Carsten Q. Schneider	Interim President and Rector
