= 2027 in the Czech Republic =

- Decades: 2000s; 2010s; 2020s
- See also: Other events of 2027; History of the Czech lands • Years

Events in the year 2027 in the Czech Republic.

== Events ==
=== Scheduled ===
- 26 June–4 July – 2027 FIBA Under-19 Basketball World Cup
- Summer – 2027 UEFA European Under-19 Championship

== Holidays ==
- 1 January – New Year's Day
- 26 March – Good Friday
- 29 March – Easter Monday
- 1 May – Labour Day
- 8 May – Victory in Europe Day
- 5 July – St. Cyril and Methodius Day
- 6 July – Jan Hus Day
- 28 September – Czech Statehood Day
- 28 October – Independent Czechoslovak State Day
- 17 November – Freedom and Democracy Day
- 24 December – Christmas Eve
- 25 December – Christmas Day
- 26 December – Saint Stephen's Day

== See also ==
- 2027 in the European Union
- 2027 in Europe
