= College of Polytechnics Jihlava =

Public higher education institution in Jihlava, Czech Republic

- Vysoká škola polytechnická Jihlava (VŠPJ)
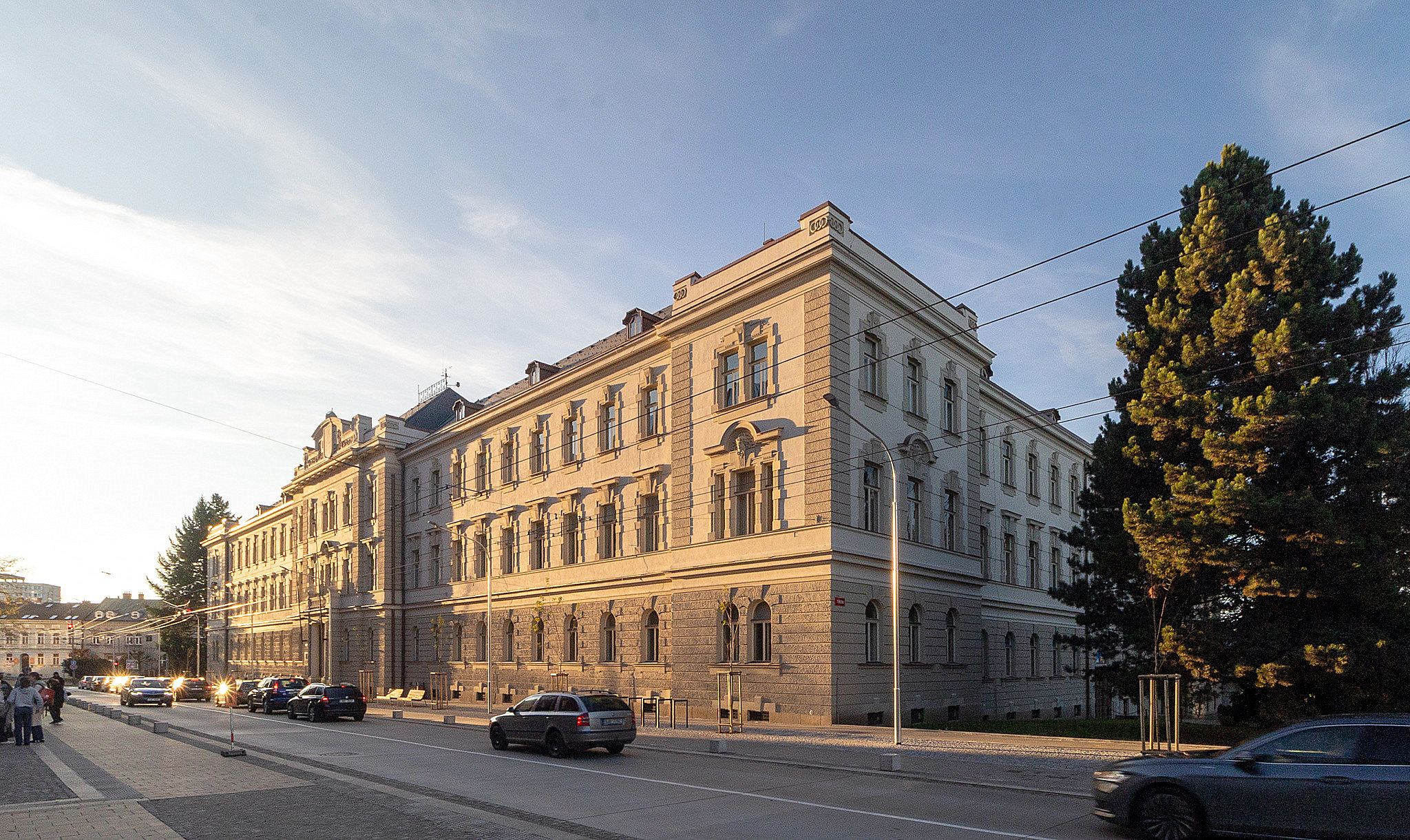
- The main historical building on Tolstého street
- Type: Public
- Established: June 3, 2004
- Rector: doc. Ing. Zdeněk Horák, Ph.D.
- Academic staff: 134 (2024)
- Students: 2,154 (2024)
- Location: Tolstého 1556/16, Jihlava, 586 01, Czech Republic; 49.3990478°N 15.5826000°E
- Campus: Urban
- Website: www.vspj.cz/en/

College of Polytechnics Jihlava is a tertiary-education institution in Jihlava, Czech Republic. It is the only non-university public college in the country and the only university-level educational institution in the Vysočina Region. As a polytechnic institution, it offers study programmes in several disciplines, rather than specializing in a specific field.

It was established by Act No. 375/2004 Coll. of 3 June 2004. Its first rector was an academic and deputy Ladislav Jirků. Since 2015, its current rector is a biomedical expert, Zdeněk Horák.

== Study programmes ==
The bachelor programmes are divided into three fields: technical (applied informatics, applied engineering and applied mechanical engineering), economic (travel/tourism, finance and management) and medical (clinical social work, midwifery and general nursing).

The Master's programmes include applied engineering, social work in mental health care and business and management.

== Buildings ==
The historical complex of the college was built at the end of the 19th century or at the start of the 20th. In the centre of the complex is an old building of the district court.

From 2018 to 2019 a new auditorium was built by the historical complex. Prior to its completion the college had to use external venues (e.g., Dukla Theatre) as auditoriums for lectures due to insufficient capacity.

New dormitories for the college are also being built on Fritzova street. They should be open in March 2027.

== Departments ==
The college is divided into 6 departments:

- Department of Economic Studies
- Department of Tourism
- Department of Technical Studies
- Department of Health Studies
- Department of Social Work
- Department of Mathematics
