= Karel Tejkal =

Czech radio journalist and publicist (1937–2026)

Karel Tejkal (11 October 1937 – 6 June 2026) was a Czech radio journalist and publicist.

== Life and work ==
Tejkal was born in Prague on 11 October 1937. He graduated from the Faculty of Arts of Charles University and from 1957 he collaborated with Czechoslovak Radio, first as an external collaborator of the sports editorial office. Later, as an employee, he went through a number of radio workplaces, and in 1968 he was a commentator on political events.

In January 1990, he returned to the radio, managed the program Dobré jitro and created a number of radio series such as Our Century, Thousand Stories and Radio on Wheels.

In 2008, he received the Ferdinand Peroutka Journalism Award for his work.

Tejkal died on 6 June 2026, at the age of 88.
