= Květoslava Kořínková =

Czech politician (1940–2026)

Member of the Chamber of Deputies of the Czech Republic
- In office 1 June 1996 – 19 June 1998

Personal details
- Born: 10 July 1940 Český Brod, Protectorate of Bohemia and Moravia
- Died: 22 January 2026 (aged 85) Liberec, Czech Republic
- Party: ČSSD
- Education: University of Žilina; Prague University of Economics and Business
- Occupation: Teacher

Květoslava Kořínková (10 July 1940 – 22 January 2026) was a Czech politician. A member of the Czech Social Democratic Party, she served in the Chamber of Deputies from 1996 to 1998.

Kořínková died on 22 January 2026, at the age of 85.
