= Ladislav Jirků =

Czech academic and politician (1946–2020)

Ladislav Jirků (4 June 1946 – 16 August 2020) was a Czech academic, former rector of the College of Polytechnics in Jihlava and politician who served as a Deputy.
