= Vratislav Ducháček =

Czech chemist and professor (1941–2018)

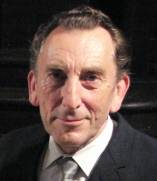
Vratislav Ducháček

Vratislav Ducháček (16 February 1941 – 5 August 2018) was a Czech chemist and university professor.

He was born in Hradec Králové. He went to the primary school as well as to the gymnasium in Prague, the capital of the Czech Republic. After that, he studied at the Institute of Chemical Technology in Prague and then he started to teach at this university; he has been teaching there up to now. In 1991, he was granted the title of Doctor of Science. Two years later, Václav Havel, the president of the Czech Republic, awarded him the university professor degree, and Ducháček became a professor of macromolecular compounds technology. He published over 300 original scientific communications, reviews, chapters in monographs, textbooks, and research reports, and delivered over 200 lectures at conferences, symposia, and seminars since the start of his career. He was a member of many international organizations, such as New York Academy of Sciences, Polymer Networks Group, Society of Plastics Engineers, or Polymer Processing Society.
