= Ivan Štampach =

Czech theologian (1946–2026)

Ivan Štampach (18 February 1946 – 10 January 2026) was a Czech religionist and theologian.

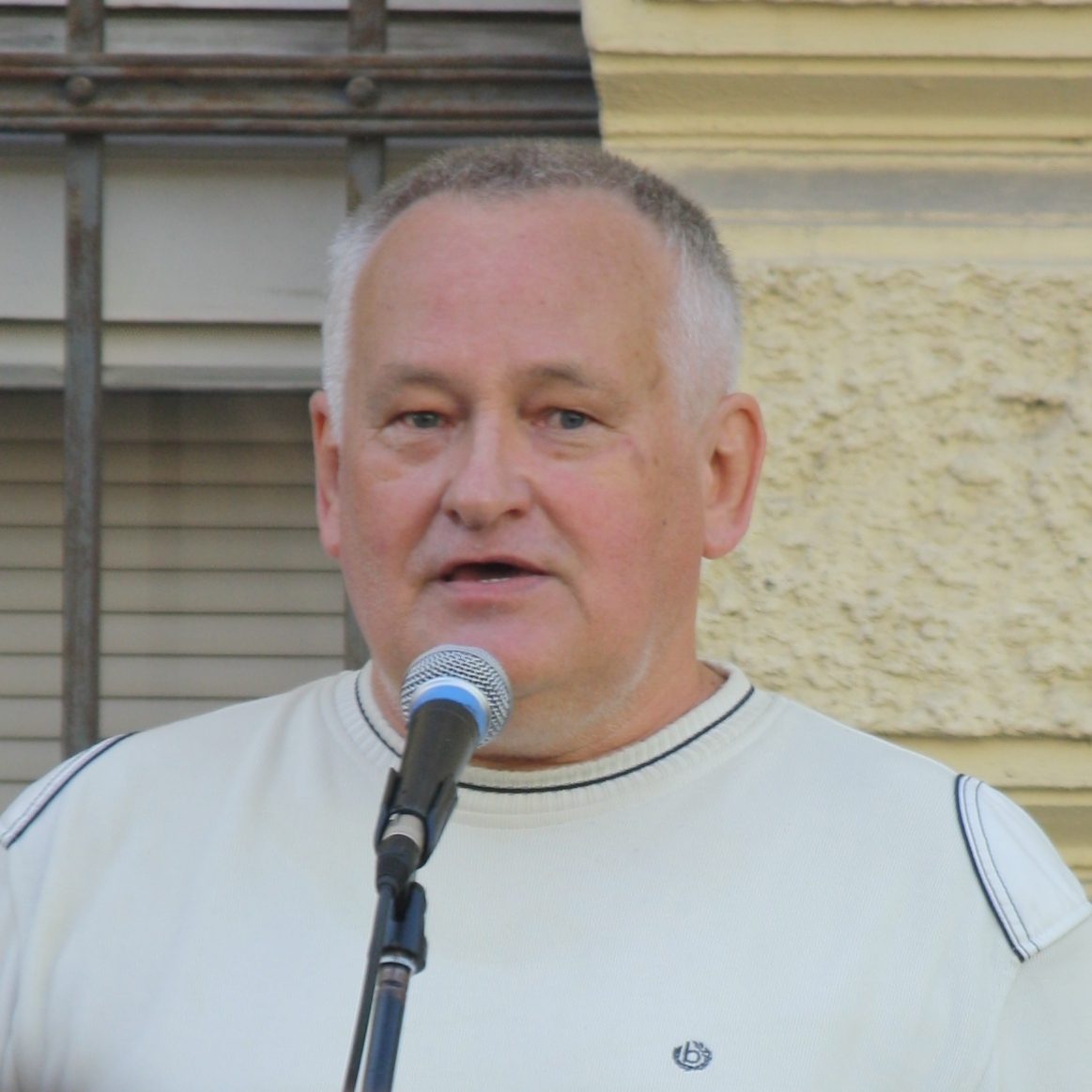
Štampach in 2011

== Life and work ==
Štampach was born in Prague on 18 February 1946. His father was an American soldier present in 1945 following the end of World War II, in western Bohemia, and soon after his birth he was adopted by Czech parents into a family.

In 1983, he was secretly ordained a Roman Catholic priest and later entered the Dominican Order, where he took the monastic name Odilo. From July 1999 he worked as a clergyman in the Prague parish of the Old Catholic Church, which put him into excommunication from the point of view of the Roman Catholic Church. He worked in this church as an auxiliary priest only until April 2002, after which he no longer worked as a clergyman in any church, although he continued to profess Christianity. From 2000 he worked at the University of Pardubice as an associate professor at the Department of Religious Studies.

In 2009, he was one of the founders of the Christian Social Platform of the ČSSD.

Štampach died on 10 January 2026, at the age of 79.
