= Rom Kostřica =

Czech politician and medical doctor (1949–2026)

Member of the Chamber of Deputies of the Czech Republic
- In office 26 October 2013 – 26 October 2017
- In office 29 May 2010 – 28 August 2013

Personal details
- Born: 13 March 1949 Brno, Czechoslovakia
- Died: 1 August 2026 (aged 77)
- Party: TOP 09
- Education: Masaryk University
- Occupation: Lecturer

Rom Kostřica (13 March 1949 – 1 August 2026) was a Czech politician, otorhinolaryngologist and university lecturer. A member of TOP 09, he served in the Chamber of Deputies from 2010 to 2013 and again from 2013 to 2017.

Kostřica died on 1 August 2026, at the age of 77.
