= Jan Málek =

Czech composer and music director (1938–2026)

Jan Málek (18 May 1938 – 10 June 2026) was a Czech composer and music director.

== Life and career ==
Málek was born in Prague on 18 May 1938. He studied at the Prague Conservatory from 1956 in the folk instruments department. He specialized in percussion instruments. He also studied composition with Miloslav Kabeláč. He became the music director of the Czechoslovak Radio in Plzeň and from 1965 to 1976 he worked as a dramaturge of the Plzeň Radio Orchestra. He was also a lecturer and dramaturge of the Pilsen Electroacoustic Laboratory. In 1976 he moved to Prague and became the music director of the Czech Radio.

Málek died on 10 June 2026, at the age of 88.
