= Mladý muž a bílá velryba: Malý chemický epos =

1973 novel by Vladimír Páral

Mladý muž a bílá velryba: Malý chemický epos is a Czech novel, written by Vladimír Páral. It was first published in 1973.
