= Vladislav Galgonek =

Czech photographer (1946–2026)

- Born: 14 May 1946; Český Těšín, Czechoslovakia
- Died: 6 April 2026 (aged 79)
- Occupations: Photographer, photojournalist
- Known for: Work for Czech News Agency (ČTK)
- Awards: Czech Press Photo, City of Olomouc Award

Vladislav Galgonek (14 May 1946 – 6 April 2026) was a Czech professional photographer and photojournalist.

== Life and career ==
Vladislav Galgonek was a native of the village of Horní Žukov, where he spent his childhood and developed a positive relationship with nature that influenced both his personal and professional life. He received his first camera from his uncle for Christmas while in the sixth grade, a moment he considered life-changing. He was interested not only in taking photos but also in the developing process; he set up his own amateur darkroom in the bathroom, where the joy of seeing his first self-made prints left a lasting impression. To further his skills, he joined a photography club and acquired a better camera, a Flexaret twin-lens reflex camera.

While his mother wanted him to study to become a veterinarian, Galgonek was drawn to photography and unsuccessfully applied to the Film and TV School of the Academy of Performing Arts in Prague (FAMU). Following this, he studied at a secondary agricultural-technical school in Český Těšín, where he continued to develop his craft and met his first well-known photographers. He continued taking photos even during his military service in Mladá Boleslav, where he served as a medic. After his service, he joined BorsodChem MCHZ (chemical plant in Ostrava), as he did not wish to continue in agriculture.

Knowing he wanted to pursue photography full-time, he completed a course in art photography at the Jaroslav Ježek Conservatory (People's Conservatory) between 1967 and 1969. In 1971, he began his professional career as an art photographer at the Odra Mine in Ostrava. On 1 February 1973, he joined the Czech News Agency (ČTK) in Prague, serving as a photojournalist for the Olomouc regional office. He continued to collaborate with ČTK even after his retirement. Between 1981 and 1985, he finally completed his studies in reportage photography at FAMU, where he had been rejected as a young man.

Based in the Olomouc office, Galgonek was removed from major political centers, allowing him to focus on photography rather than political matters. Following the Velvet Revolution, he found greater professional freedom as strict regulations were relaxed—allowing for the reporting of accidents, disasters, fires, religious matters, and even erotica. He particularly enjoyed religious themes and any subject that allowed for a unique shot. Conversely, he found natural disasters difficult, as he had to face the suffering of people losing their homes. He photographed both in the Czech Republic and abroad.

Galgonek participated in numerous exhibitions and competitions, notably with the group H 70, and organized many solo exhibitions. He was a member of the Union of Visual Artists of the Czech Republic and the art group STŘET 2001. Known for his commitment, he often entered dangerous locations to capture high-quality photographs. He photographed famous figures including Pope John Paul II and President Václav Havel. His work was highly regarded and received many awards, including several from Czech Press Photo. In June 2007, he was awarded the City of Olomouc Award for his contributions to fine arts and photography.

He preferred traditional photography, including developing and processing, and found the transition to digital photography difficult. He was more fond of black-and-white photography, which he felt was more natural than color, believing that color "stole the spirit" of the photograph. He was a photographer who took fewer but more calculated shots. In his private life, he photographed nature as a balance to his professional reportage work.

Galgonek married twice; he had a son, David, from his first marriage and a daughter, Terezie, from his second.

Galgonek died on 6 April 2026, at the age of 79.

== Solo exhibitions ==
Galgonek held exhibitions beginning in the 1970s, including:

- Hukvaldy (1976)
- Uničov (1984, 1987)
- Jeseník (1985)
- Havířov (1992)
- Šternberk (1992)
- Olomouc (1990, 1996, 1999, 2004, 2006)
- Mohelnice (2001)
