= Václav Cigler =

Czech sculptor (1929–2026)

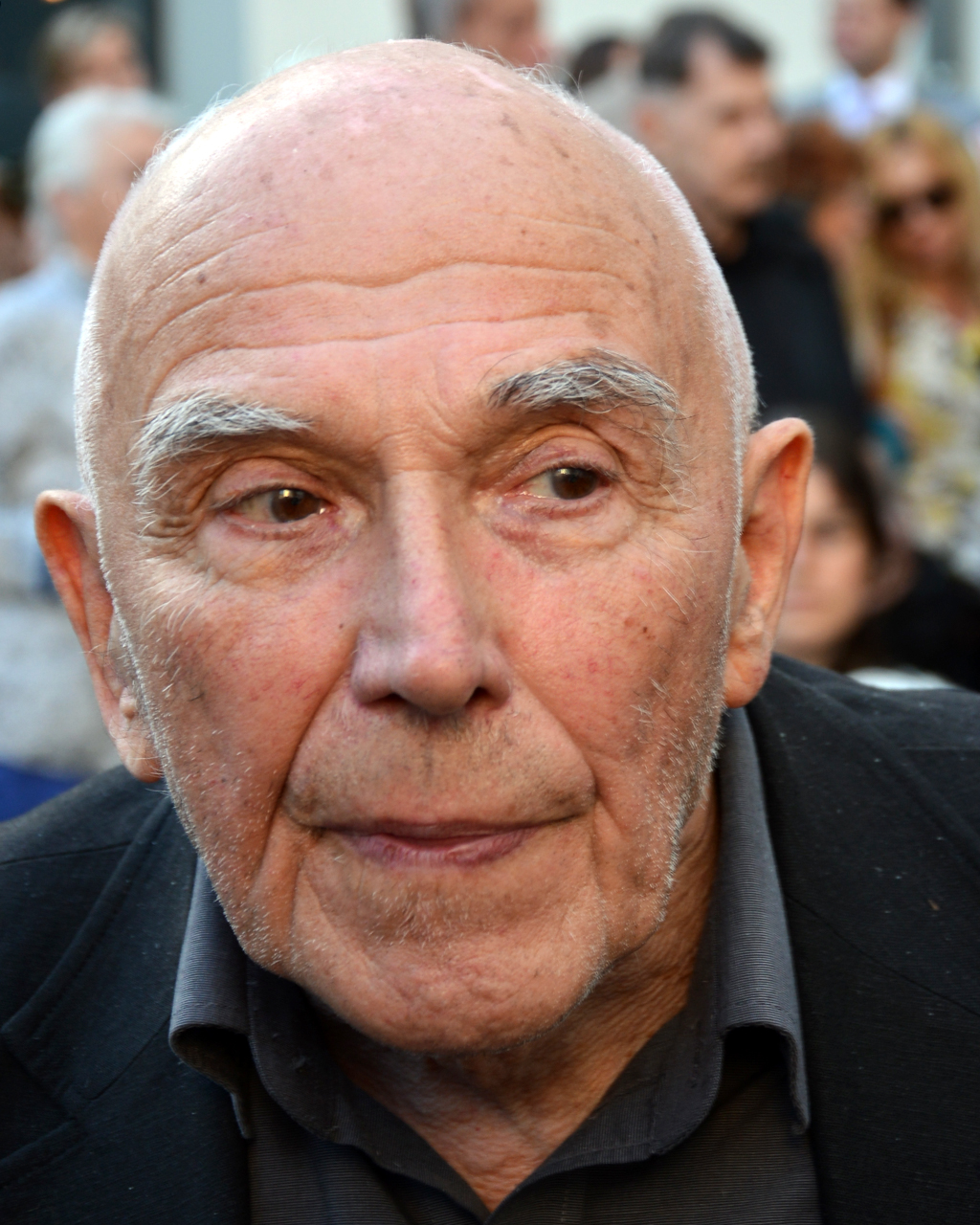
- Cigler in 2016
- Born: 21 April 1929; Vsetín, Czechoslovakia
- Died: 8 January 2026 (aged 96)
- Education: Academy of Arts, Architecture and Design in Prague
- Known for: Sculptor

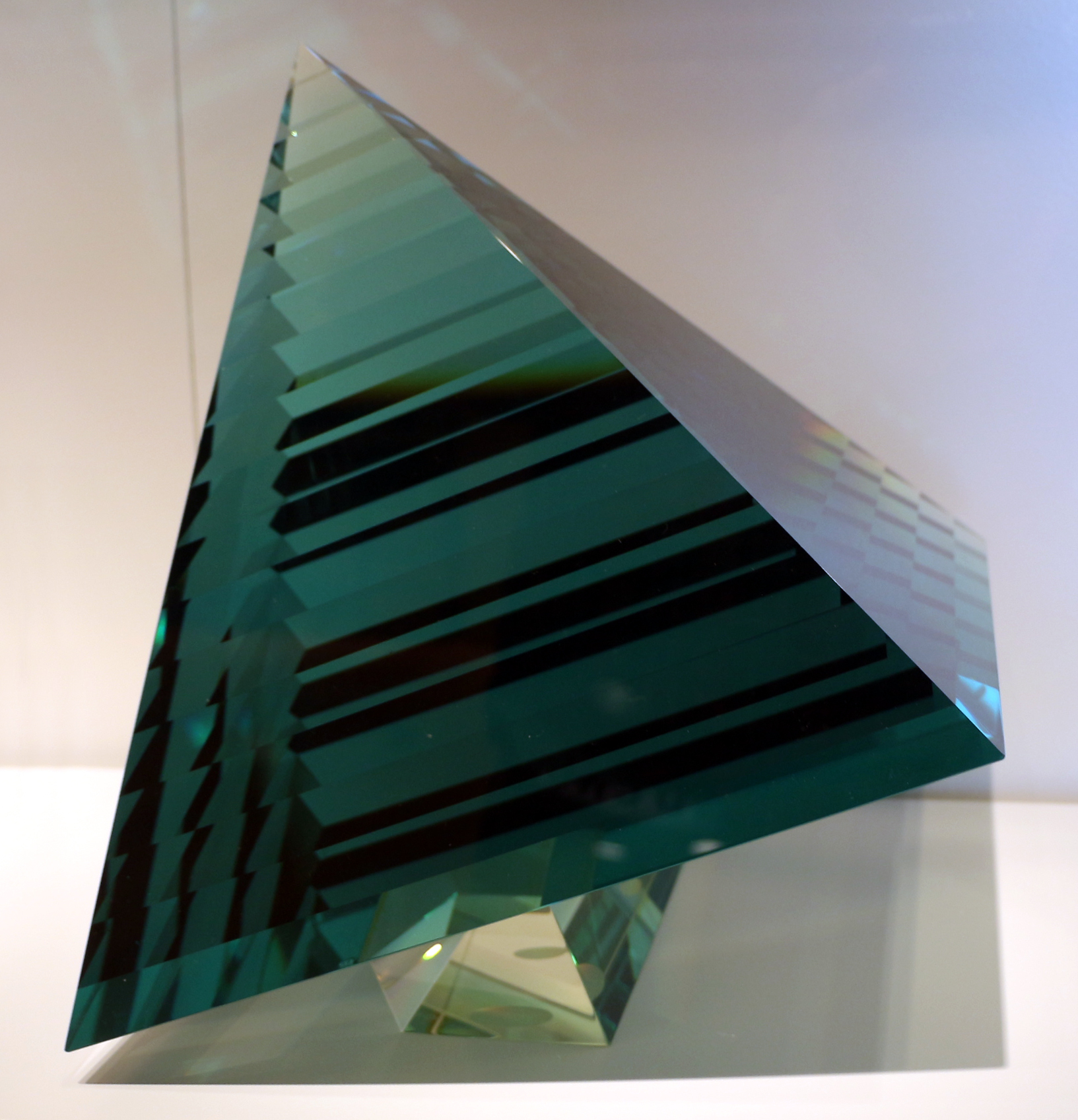
piramide architettonica, 1994.

Václav Cigler (21 April 1929 – 8 January 2026) was a Czech glass sculptor. He was inducted into the Hall of Fame of Czech Design in 2018 and awarded the State Prize from the Czech Ministry of Culture in 2019. Cigler died on 8 January 2026, at the age of 96.
