= Vladimír Páral =

Czech fiction writer (1932–2026)

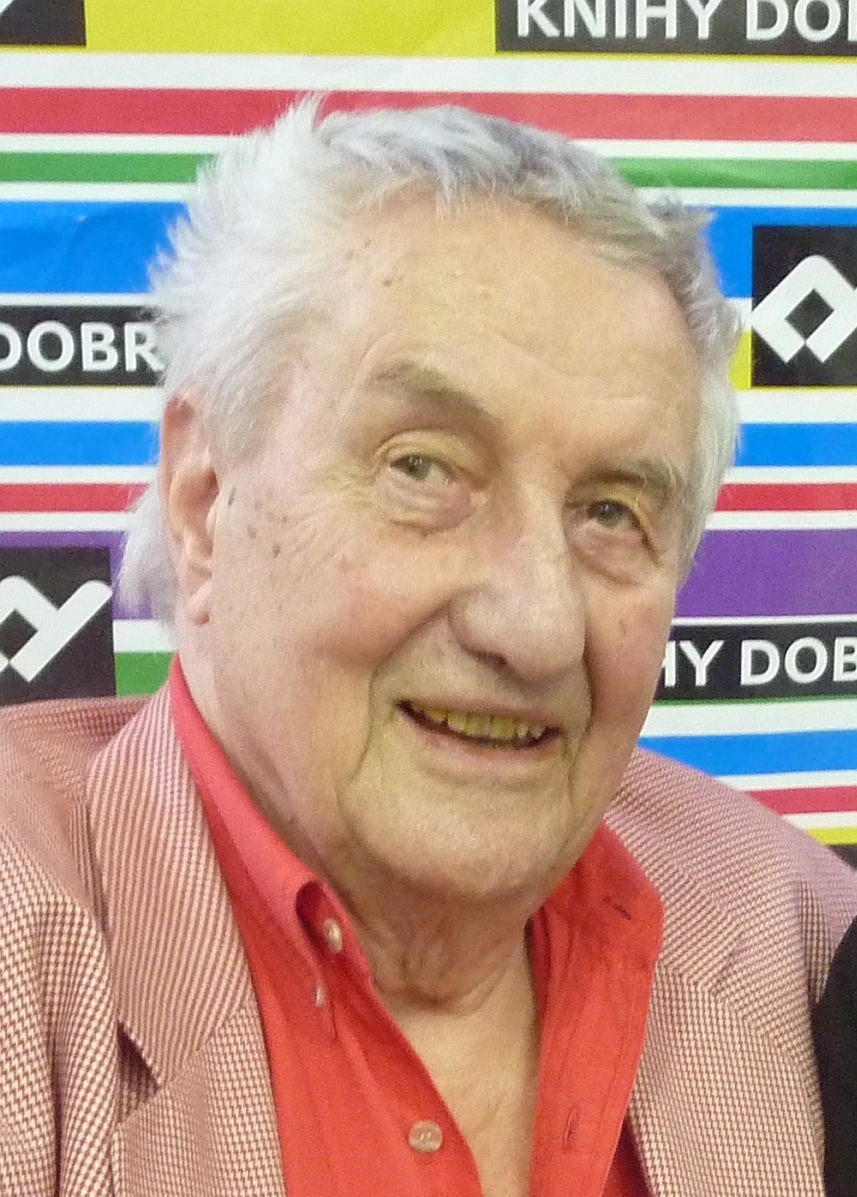
Páral in 2014

Vladimír Páral (10 August 1932 – 10 August 2026) was a Czech writer whose work ranged from biting satire to works of Socialist Realism, produced under the communist regime.

== Life and career ==
Although born in Prague, he spent his early years in Brno, where his father was a military officer. After graduating from secondary school, he received technical training then went on to study chemical engineering at a branch of the University of Chemistry and Technology in Pardubice; graduating in 1954.

Páral worked at various locations until 1967, when he took a permanent position at the Institute of Scientific, Technical and Economic Information. He had begun writing in 1962, and made contributions to the local daily, Průboj, under the name Jan Laban. Five years later, he started to write novels and, in 1972, became an editor at Severočeském nakladatelství.

In 1977, he was one of the signatories to Anticharta, a formal government document condemning Charter 77, a human rights initiative. In 1992, some classified documents were leaked, including a list of people who had allegedly worked for the StB (secret police), and Páral's name was on that list.

From 1995, he divided his time between Prague and Mariánské Lázně.

Páral died at a hospital in Cheb, on 10 August 2026, his 94th birthday.

== Bibliography ==
=== Black pentalogy ===
- Veletrh splněných přání (Fair granted wishes), 1964
- Soukromá vichřice: Laboratorní zpráva ze života hmyzu (Private storm: Laboratory note of insect's life), 1966
- Katapult: Jízdní řád železničních, lodních a leteckých drah do ráje (Catapult: Traffic order of railway, shipment and airlines into paradise), 1967
- Milenci a vrazi: Magazín ukájení před rokem 2000 (Lovers and murders: Magazine of cater before year 2000), 1969
- Profesionální žena: Román pro každého (Professional woman: Novel for everyone), 1971

=== White pentalogy ===
- Mladý muž a bílá velryba: Malý chemický epos (Young man and white whale: Little chemical epic), 1973
- Radost až do rána: O křečcích a lidech (Joy until morning: About hamsters and people), 1975
- Generální zázrak: Román naděje (General miracle: Romance of hope), 1977
- Muka obraznosti: Konfrontace snu a skutečnosti (Agony of symbolic: Confrontation of dream and reality), 1980

=== Sci-fi ===
- Romeo & Julie 2300, 1982
- Pokušení A-ZZ (Tepmting A-ZZ), 1982
- Válka s mnohozvířetem (War with manybeast), 1983
- Země žen (World of woman), 1987

=== Later works ===
- Dekameron 2000 aneb Láska v Praze, 1990
- Kniha rozkoší, smíchu a radosti, 1992
- Playgirls 1 and 2, 1994
- Profesionální muž, 1995
- Tam za vodou, 1995
