= Václav Klučka =

Czech politician (1953–2026)

Member of the Chamber of Deputies of the Czech Republic
- In office 3 June 2006 – 26 October 2017
- In office 1 January 1993 – 6 June 1996

Member of the Czech National Council
- In office 6 June 1992 – 31 December 1992

Personal details
- Born: 20 July 1953 Opava, Czechoslovakia
- Died: 10 January 2026 (aged 72) Czech Republic
- Party: KSČM; ČSSD
- Education: VSB Ostrava

Václav Klučka (20 July 1953 – 10 January 2026) was a Czech politician. A member of the Communist Party of Bohemia and Moravia and the Czech Social Democratic Party, he served in the National Council from June to December 1992 and in the Chamber of Deputies from 1993 to 1996 and again from 2006 to 2017.

Klučka died on 10 January 2026, at the age of 72.
