= František Mezihorák =

Czech politician (1937–2026)

Member of the Senate of the Czech Republic for District No. 61 – Olomouc
- In office 21 November 1998 – 21 November 2004
- Preceded by: Josef Jařab
- Succeeded by: Jan Hálek

Personal details
- Born: 6 October 1937 Vracov, Czechoslovakia
- Died: 20 February 2026 (aged 88) Olomouc, Czech Republic
- Party: ČSSD
- Education: Palacký University Olomouc
- Occupation: Professor

František Mezihorák (6 October 1937 – 20 February 2026) was a Czech politician. A member of the Czech Social Democratic Party, he served in the Senate from 1998 to 2004.

Mezihorák died in Olomouc on 20 February 2026, at the age of 88.
