= 2026 Pardubice arson attack =

Arson attack in the Czech Republic

Coordinates: 50°1′30″N 15°49′7″E

- Location: Pardubice, Czech Republic
- Date: March 19, 2026; March 20, 2026; 04:20 a.m. (UTC+01:00)
- Target: Elbit Systems (LPP Holding)
- Deaths: 0
- Injuries: 0

An arson attack occurred on the night of 19–20 March 2026 at the headquarters of LPP Holding in Pardubice, Czech Republic. During the arson attack, two of the company’s production facilities—dedicated to the manufacture of drones and armaments—were fully incinerated. In the wake of the controversy, the incumbent Interior Minister Lubomír Metnar summoned a crisis task force. Lenka Bradáčová, acting as the highest public prosecutor at the time, refused to discount the prospect of terrorism as the underlying cause of the manufacturing plant blaze. The incumbent Prime Minister at the time, Andrej Babiš, summoned the State Security Council following the attack. After the meeting, Babiš called on arms companies to increase security at their own expense.

== Chronological timeline of the incident ==
Shortly before 4:20 a.m. local time, a fire broke out at an LPP Holding production facility on Dělnická Street in Pardubice. The company reported that the incident resulted in no casualties or injuries. The fire engulfed two structures: production facility and administrative complex. The company estimated property damage at hundreds of millions of Czech korunas.
