= Miloslav Masopust =

Czech general (1924–2026)

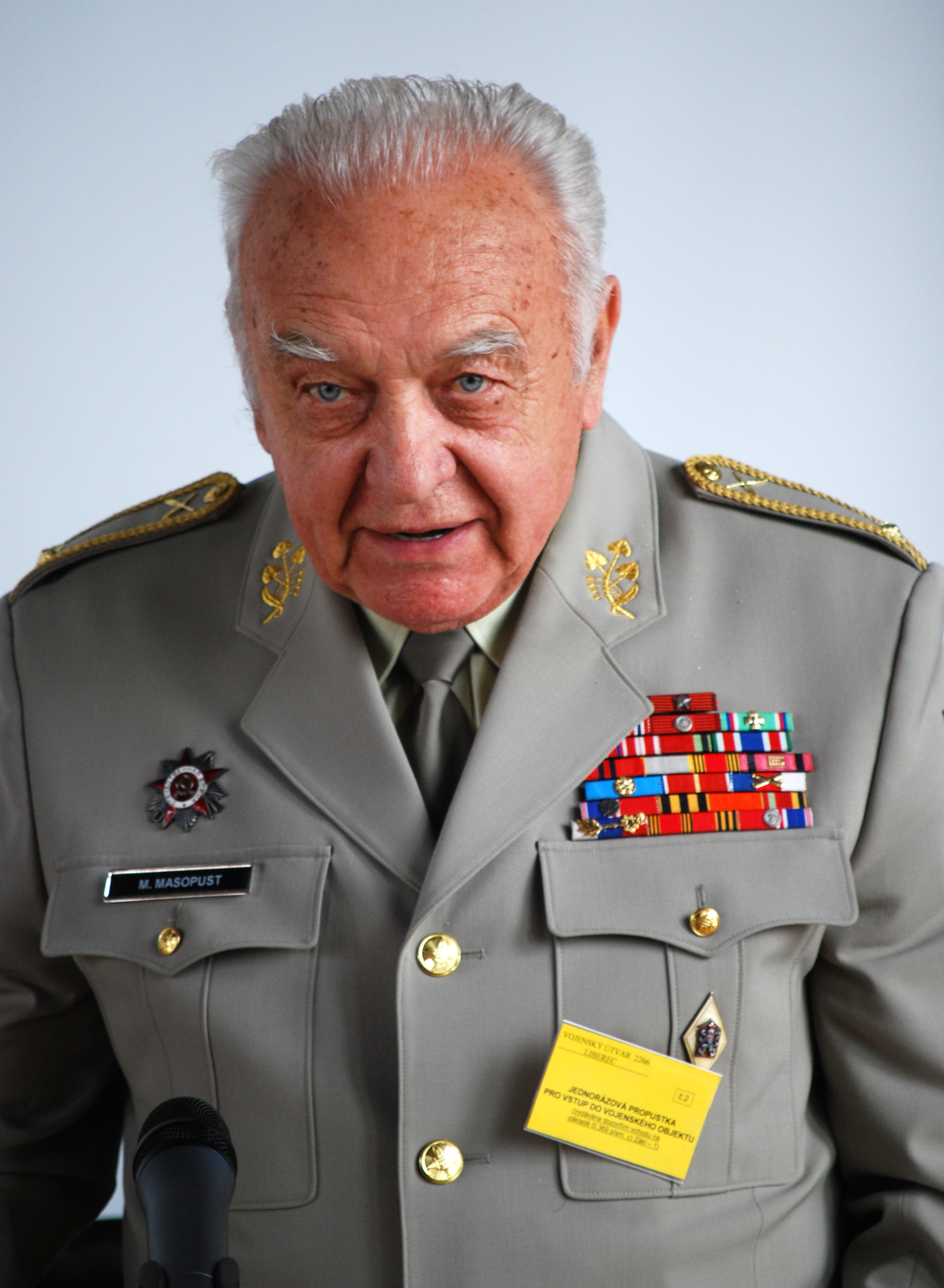
- Masopust in 2009
- Born: 26 September 1924; Český Straklov, Poland
- Died: 4 January 2026 (aged 101)
- Military career
- Rank: Lieutenant general
- Unit: 1st Czechoslovak Army Corps
- Conflicts: World War II; Battle of the Dukla Pass; Slovak National Uprising
- Other work: Vice-president of the Czechoslovak Association of Legionaries (2002–2004)

Miloslav Masopust (26 September 1924 – 4 January 2026) was a general of the Czechoslovak Army Corps in the Soviet Union.

== Early life ==
Masopust was born on 26 September 1924, in Český Straklov in Volhynia, Dubno district. At the time, the city was part of Western Ukraine, which was occupied by Poland. Masopust attended a Polish grammar school until the Soviet Union occupied the region in 1939. During the German-Soviet invasion of Poland, Masopust witnessed a German pilot, who piloted a Czechoslovak aircraft, bomb train transports full of refugees and wounded soldiers.

Shortly after the occupation began, the Soviets disbanded grammar schools and replaced them with ten-year schools. Ukrainian grammar schools were re-established when the Nazis invaded in 1941. Masopust continued his education at the Simeni Petljura Grammar School until it was closed down nine months after it was reestablished. He was able to find a job in a meat factory and avoided forced labor.

When the Nazis invaded, they set up a ghetto in Dubno where they sent all the Jews in the Western Ukraine. Eventually, after robbing them of their possessions, the Nazis transported the inhabitants to the site of an unfinished Soviet airfield near Dubno. After undressing them and forcing them into the pits designated for the construction of hangars, they were executed. Those who managed to escape the pits to a nearby village were eventually slaughtered along with the families housing them.

== Czechoslovak Army Corps ==
By February 1944, the Soviets were headquartered in Volhynia (now Northwest Ukraine) and locked in a stalemate with the Germans fortified behind the River Ikva near Dubna on high ground. Masopust crossed over the lines and joined the Czechoslovak army corps. He was trained and assigned as a squad leader of a squad of machine gunners.

After he was wounded at Krosno, he was sent to a vehicle operation course and assigned to the 5th Artillery Regiment, with whom he participated in the Slovak National Uprising as a supply troop commander.

== Postwar ==
After the war, Masopust briefly worked as an administrator on an agricultural farm with his father. In 1947, he applied to the Military Academy and served in leadership positions within artillery units. He ended his service with the rank of brigadier general. He served as the vice-president of the Czechoslovak Association of Legionaries from 2002 to 2004. In 2015, at age 91, he married his second wife. He turned 100 on 26 September 2024, and died on 4 January 2026, at the age of 101.
