= University College of Business in Prague =

Private College of Business in Prague
- Vysoká škola obchodní v Praze, o.p.s.
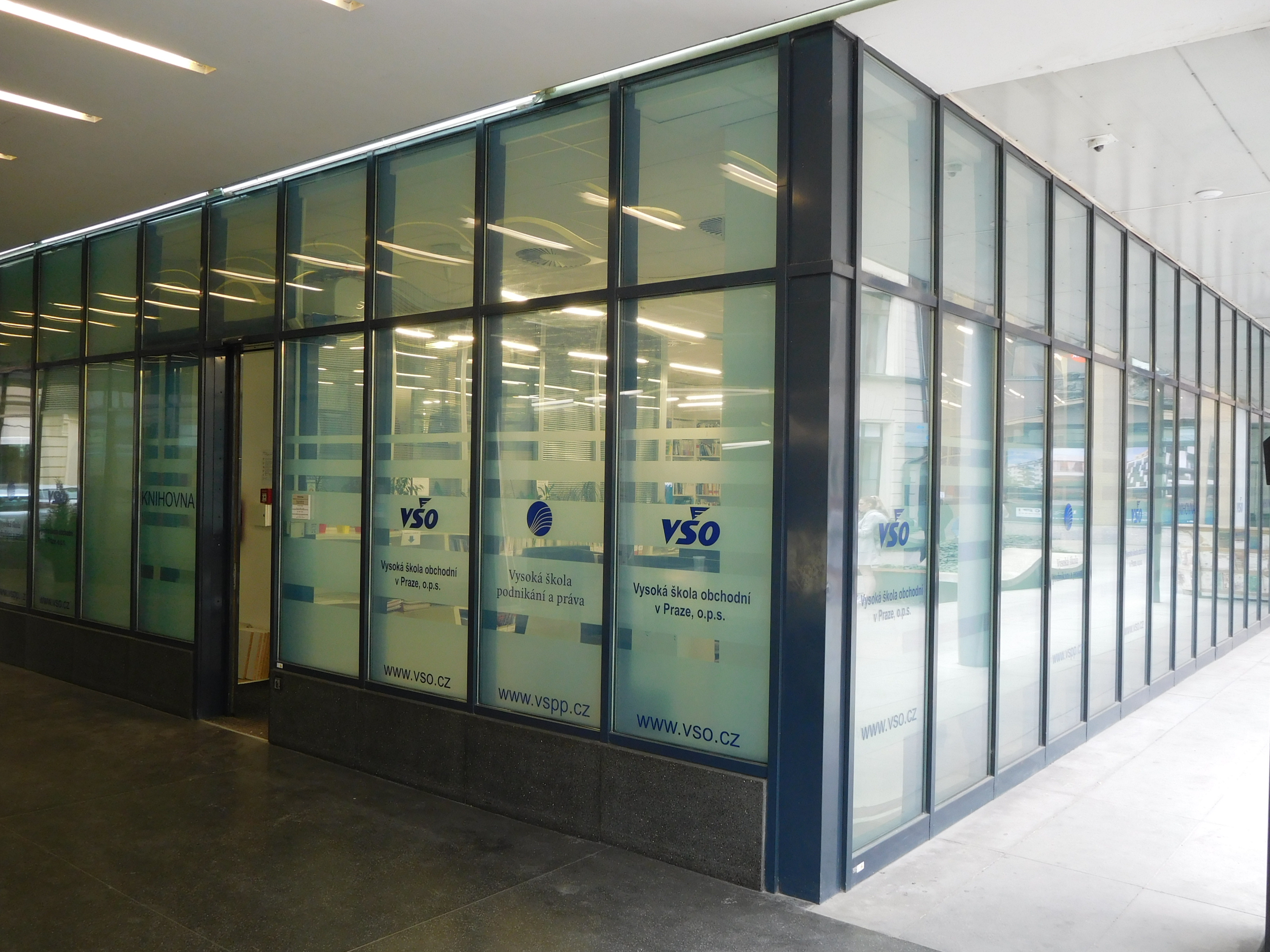
- The college library in the Spálená-Vladislavova passage
- Type: Private
- Established: 2000
- Rector: doc. Ing. Jindřich Ploch, CSc.
- Location: Spalená 76/14, 110 00 Prague, Czech Republic; 50°4′50.14″N 14°25′11.73″E
- Website: www.vso.cz

The Private College of Business in Prague (Czech: Vysoká škola obchodní v Praze, abbreviated VŠO Praha) is a not-for-profit private university in Prague, Czech Republic. It has been a private higher education institution with the accredited study programmes of International Territorial Studies and Economy and Management in Transport and Communications since 2000.

The University College of Business (VŠO) is a member of distinguished European organizations active in the fields of tourism, air transport and education, and is a partner of a number of European universities.
