= Božena Jirků =

Czech journalist and editor (1947–2026)

Božena Jirků (19 September 1947 – 22 March 2026) was a Czech journalist and editor who was executive director of the Charter 77 Foundation from 2002 to 2026. She died on 22 March 2026, at the age of 78.
