= Vladimír Liščák =

Czech sinologist (1954–2026)

Vladimír Liščák (9 February 1954 – 20 February 2026) was a Czech sinologist.

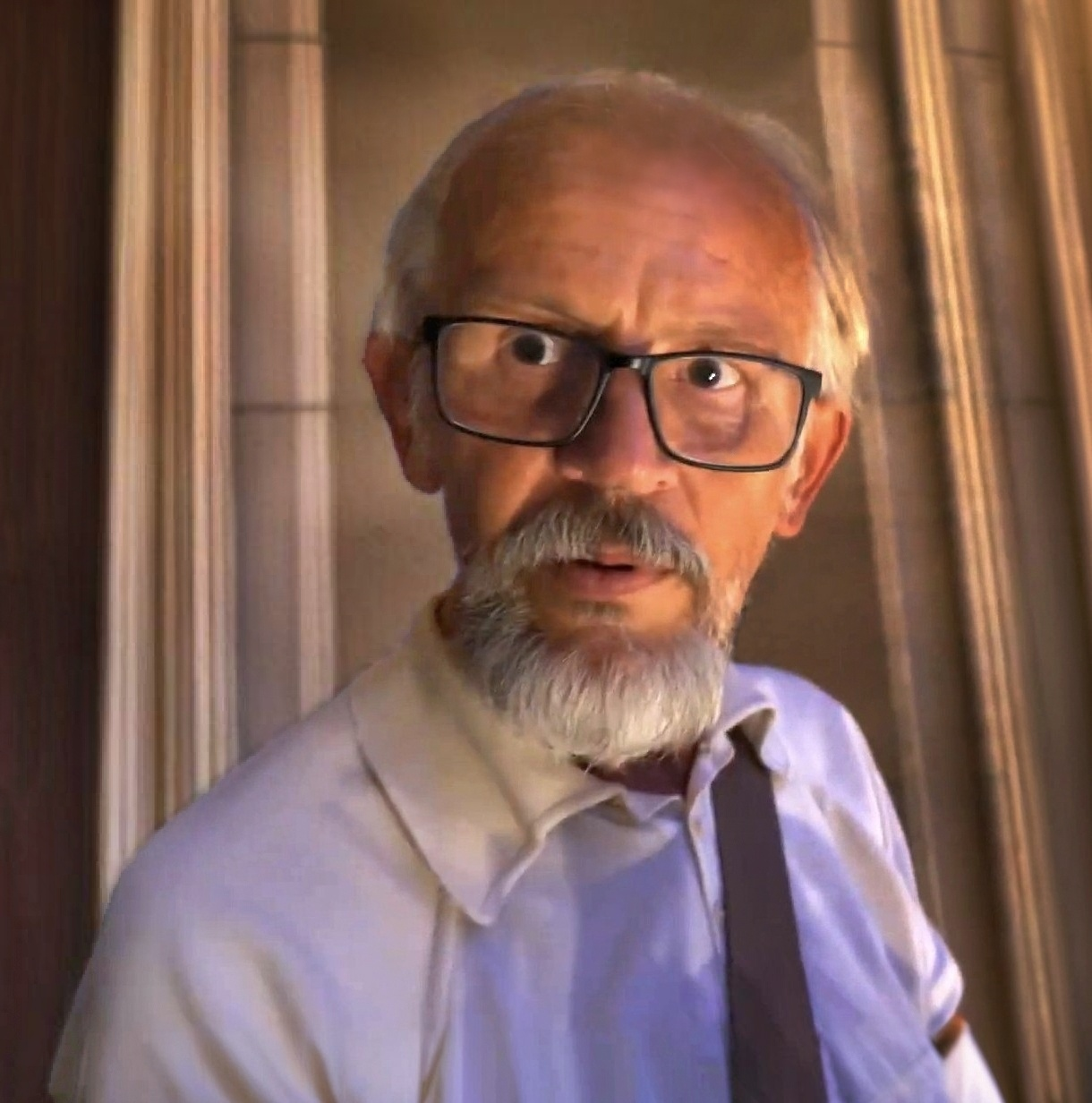
Liščák in 2024

== Life and career ==
Liščák was born on 9 February 1954. He was a researcher at the East Asia Department of the Oriental Institute of the Czech Academy of Sciences. He published a number of books during his life.

From 2001, Liščák was a member of the Nomenclature Commission of the Czech Chamber of Commerce. He was a co-author of most of the publications in the series Geographical Nomenclature Lists of the United Nations – Czech Republic and the head of the authorial team for publications devoted to the names of states.

Liščák died after suffering a fall on 23 February 2026, at the age of 72.
