= Josef Jařab =

Czech academic and politician (1937–2023)

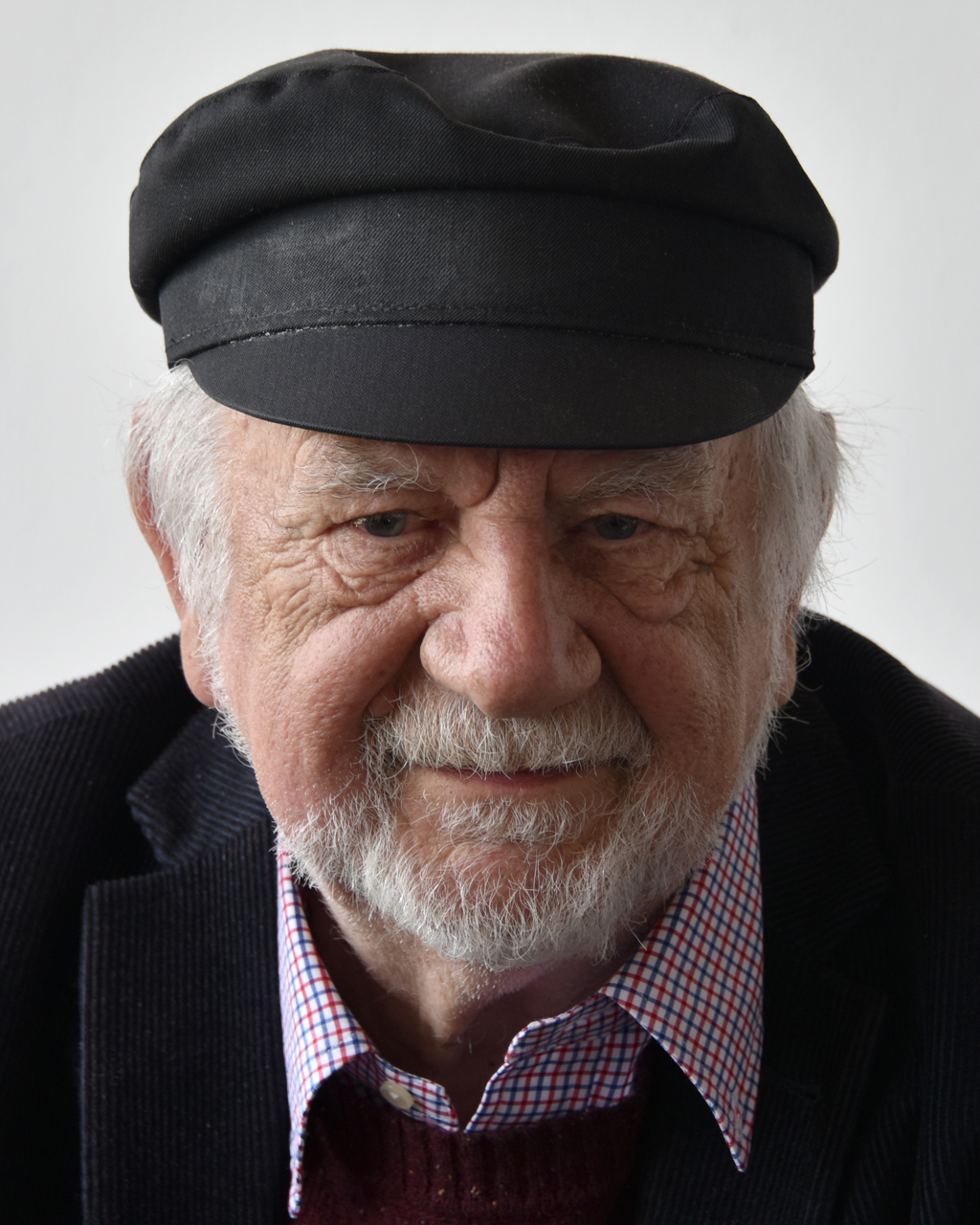
- Jařab in 2019

Member of the Senate of the Czech Republic
- In office 19 November 2000 – 19 November 2006
- Preceded by: Jan Voráček
- Succeeded by: Václav Vlček
- Constituency: Senate District No. 68 – Opava
- In office 23 November 1996 – 23 November 1998
- Preceded by: position established
- Succeeded by: František Mezihorák
- Constituency: Senate District No. 61 – Olomouc

Rector of Palacký University Olomouc
- In office 19 January 1990 – 31 January 1997
- Preceded by: Jaromír Kolařík
- Succeeded by: Lubomír Dvořák

Personal details
- Born: 26 July 1937 Kravaře, Czechoslovakia
- Died: 3 May 2023 (aged 85) Olomouc, Czech Republic
- Party: ODA
- Occupation: Professor

Josef Jařab (26 July 1937 – 3 May 2023) was a Czech academic and politician. Rector of and professor at Palacký University Olomouc, and a member of the Civic Democratic Alliance, he served in the Senate from 1996 to 1998 and again from 2000 to 2006.

In 2018 he was awarded The VIZE 97 Prize and Czech President Petr Pavel awarded him the Medal of Merit. Jařab died in Olomouc on 3 May 2023, at the age of 85.

== See also ==
- List of presidents and rectors of Central European University
