= 2025 in Taiwan =

- Decades: 2000s; 2010s; 2020s
- See also: Other events of 2025; History of Taiwan • Timeline • Years

Events from the year 2025 in Taiwan, Republic of China. This year is numbered Minguo 114 according to the official Republic of China calendar.

According to the directorate general of statistics, the economy grew 8.6% this year, the fastest growth since 2010, largely attributed to the AI boom.

== Incumbents ==
=== Government ===
The national government, elected in 2024, continues.

- President: Lai Ching-te
- Vice President: Hsiao Bi-khim
- Premier: Cho Jung-tai
- Vice Premier: Cheng Li-chun
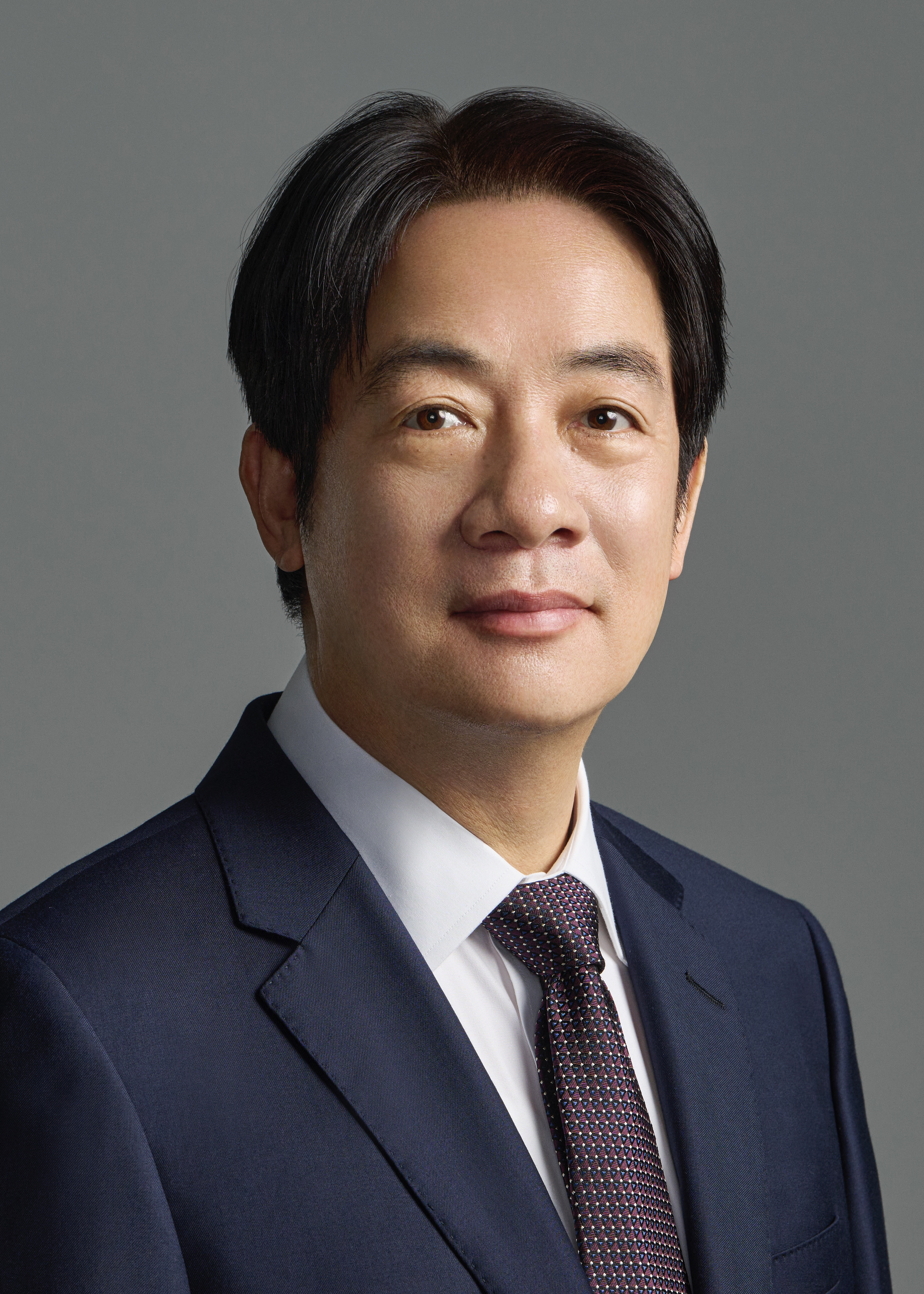
Lai Ching-te

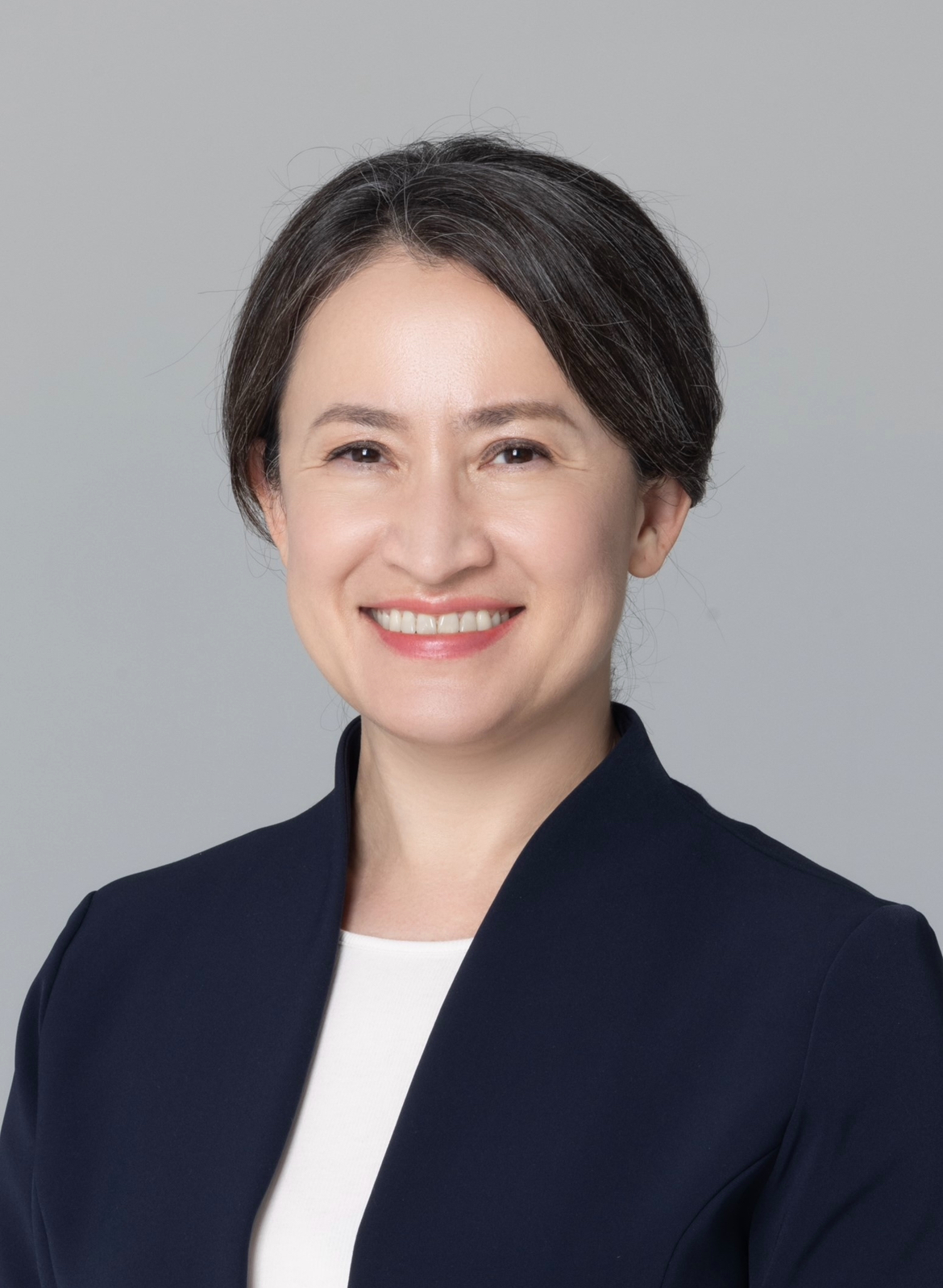
Hsiao Bi-khim

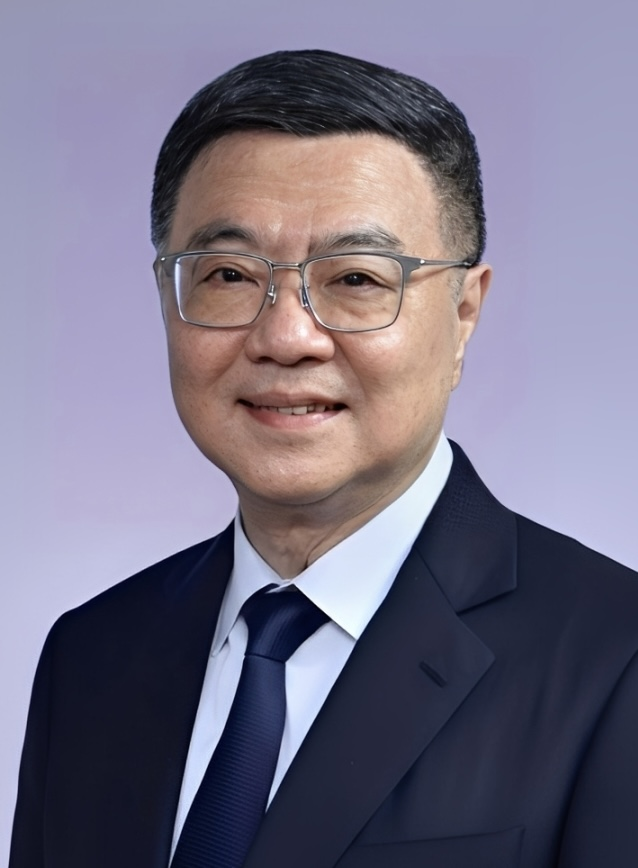
Cho Jung-tai

== Events ==
=== January ===
- 16 January – Huang Lin-kai becomes the first person to be executed in Taiwan since 2020 after having been convicted for the 2013 rape and murder of his ex-girlfriend and the murder of her mother.
- 21 January –
  - A magnitude 6.4 earthquake hits Chiayi County, injuring 44 people.
  - An officer of the Republic of China Air Force dies after being sucked into a fighter jet engine in Ching Chuan Kang Air Base, Taichung.
- 23 January –
  - The government announces plans to cull 120,000 green iguanas nationwide, citing their impact on the agricultural sector.
  - President Lai signs into law a bill requiring ten justices to constitute a quorum at the Constitutional Court.
- 31 January – The government bans employees in the public sector and key infrastructure facilities from using the Chinese artificial intelligence application DeepSeek, citing national security concerns.

=== February ===
- 4 February – The Hsinchu District Court sentences nine people to up to ten years' imprisonment over the discovery of a cannabis-growing operation in Hsinchu County that becomes the largest such operation uncovered in Taiwan, with nearly 6,000 cannabis plants and related products valued at NT$2 billion (US$60.81 million) recovered.
- 5 February – A 73-year old man is arrested in Kaohsiung on suspicion of killing three women in a suspected serial murder.
- 13 February – 2025 Taichung Shin Kong Mitsukoshi gas explosion: Four people are killed in a gas explosion at a department store in Taichung.
- 15 February –
  - An T-BE5A Brave Eagle training aircraft of the Republic of China Air Force crashes off the coast of Taitung. The pilot is rescued.
  - Acting Taiwan People's Party chair Huang Kuo-chang is elected in an internal by-election to lead the party and fill out the unexpired term of his predecessor, Ko Wen-je, until 2026.
- 21–25 February – The Taipei Dome hosts Pool A of the World Baseball Classic 2025 Qualifiers.
- 22 February – Amid unprecedented overcrowding in emergency rooms, the Taiwan Society of Emergency Medicine calls on the government to act.
- 25 February –
  - TPP lawmaker Wu Chun-cheng resigns from the Legislative Yuan amid allegations of conflict of interest in supporting a bill seeking to address aging through industrial development.
  - The Taiwan-Penghu No. 3 submarine communications cable linking Taiwan island and Penghu County is severed, prompting the detention of a Togolese-flagged vessel and its Chinese crew by Taiwanese authorities after they were spotted in the vicinity of the area were the cable was cut.
- 26 February –
  - EVA Air imposes a ban on passengers using or charging power banks and spare lithium batteries on flights beginning on 1 March.
  - The Disciplinary Court convicts former ambassador Michael Hsu of workplace sexual harassment when he was head of the Taipei Economic and Cultural Office in the Philippines from 2018 to 2023 and sentences him to an employment ban of three years and a fine of NT$500,000 (US$15,241).

=== March ===
- 3 March – US President Donald Trump and TSMC's CEO announce a new $100 billion investment to build chip manufacturing facilities in the United States. The investment requires approval by the Taiwanese government.
- 12 March – Chung Wen-chih absconds after failing to report to police following his sentencing to 30 years and five months in prison for securities fraud, from which he was accused of profiting NT$400 million.
- 13 March – In a speech, President Lai labels China a "foreign hostile force" and announces a set of new national security measures, including plans to reinstate a peacetime military court system.

=== April ===
- 1 April – China conducts military drills off Taiwan's coasts as a warning against Taiwan independence and as "punishment for the Lai Ching-te administration's rampant 'pro-independence' provocations".
- 7 April – Taiwan's benchmark stock market index drops by 9.7%, the largest one-day percentage fall in history.
- 9 April – US tariffs of 32% on imports from Taiwan, except semiconductors, take effect.
- 10 April – The US lowers a 32% tariff on imports from Taiwan to 10%, as part of a tariff pause for most countries.
- 30 April — Somalia imposes an entry ban on Taiwanese nationals due to Taiwan opening "unauthorized offices", prompting a reciprocal response by Taiwan on Somali nationals.

=== May ===
- 17–30 May – 2025 Summer World Masters Games
- 19 May – Three people are killed in a car-ramming at an intersection in New Taipei City.

=== June ===
- 11 June – A M_{L} 6.4 earthquake shakes the eastern coast, with shaking felt across the island and in parts of Penghu. No casualties are reported.
- 12 June – A Chinese ship captain is convicted and sentenced to three years' imprisonment by the Tainan District Court for damaging an undersea cable connecting the Taiwanese mainland to Penghu.
- 23 June – Fares on the Taiwan Railway increase for the first time in 30 years.

=== July ===
- 4 July – The Republic of China Air Force retires its fleet of F-5 fighter jets after 60 years in operation.
- 6 July – Typhoon Danas makes landfall near Budai, Chiayi County, killing two people and injuring 502 others.
- 12 July – Taiwan deploys U.S.-supplied HIMARS rocket systems in Taichung during their first use in the annual Han Kuang Exercise.
- 21 July – One person is killed in a car accident on Provincial Highway 9 in Hualien County, which is partly blamed on the effects of Tropical Storm Wipha.
- 25 July – 3 August – Tainan hosts the 2025 U-12 Baseball World Cup. The Chinese Taipei national under-12 baseball team finishes fourth.
- 26 July – 2025 Taiwanese recall votes: Recall elections are held in 24 electoral districts of the Legislative Yuan held by the Kuomintang. All nominated MPs are retained in office.

=== August ===
- 8 August – The first case of chikungunya in Taiwan is detected in a woman who had traveled to a virus-affected area in Foshan, China.
- 13 August – Typhoon Podul makes landfall over Taitung County, leaving one person missing and injuring 112 others.
- 19 August – Huang Chung-wei, the son of former DPP lawmaker Huang Jen-shu, is sentenced by the Kaohsiung District Court to two years' imprisonment for selling fuel to North Korea in violation of United Nations sanctions and the Counter-Terrorism Financing Act.
- 23 August –
  - 2025 Taiwanese recall votes: Recall elections are held in seven electoral districts of the Legislative Yuan held by the Kuomintang. All nominated MPs are retained in office.
  - 2025 Taiwanese referendum: A proposal by the Taiwan People's Party, with the support of the Kuomintang, to extend the operations of the Maanshan Nuclear Power Plant fails in a referendum after the number of affirmative votes fails to reach the 25% threshold needed for it to pass.
- 24 August – Taiwan wins its first Little League World Series title since 1996 after defeating Nevada 7-0 in the final held at South Williamsport, Pennsylvania, United States.
- 27 August – A magnitude 5.3 earthquake hits Yilan County, causing a ceiling collapse at the National Taiwan Normal University in Taipei.

=== September ===
- 13 September – The Chinese aircraft carrier Fujian sails through the Taiwan Strait for the first time, accompanied by two guided-missile destroyers en route to the South China Sea for training and scientific experiments.
- 23 September – The Matai'an Creek Barrier Lake in Hualien County overflows during the onslaught of Typhoon Ragasa, causing flooding in Guangfu Township and killing at least 18 people.
- 25 September – Four people, including a former aide of president Lai, are sentenced to up to 10 years' imprisonment on charges of spying for China.

=== October ===
- 1 October – Digital activist Audrey Tang is awarded the Right Livelihood Award for her role in "advancing the social use of digital technology to empower citizens, renew democracy and heal divides".
- 19 October – Cheng Li-wun wins 2025 Kuomintang chairmanship election.
- 21 October – The first cases of African swine fever in Taiwan are recorded at a pig farm in Taichung, resulting in the culling of 195 pigs and a five-day nationwide ban on the transport and slaughter of the animals.

=== November ===
- 11 November – Chiang Han-sun, a former president of Fu Jen Catholic University in New Taipei, is injured in a stabbing at Fu Jen Catholic University Hospital.
- 13 November – Former Keelung City Councilor Han Liang-chi is sentenced to seven years' imprisonment for corruption after fraudulently obtaining property and misappropriating public funds of over NT$6.58 million (US$211,590).

=== December ===
- 4 December – The government announces that it will block access to the Xiaohongshu app for one year, citing cybersecurity risks and fraud cases on the app.
- 15 December – In an unprecedented move, Premier Cho Jung-tai refuses to enact a local revenue-sharing law passed by the Legislative Yuan.
- 19 December –
  - 2025 Taipei stabbings: A man carries out a knife and smoke bomb attack in Taipei, killing three people and injuring six others. The attacker dies after falling from a building.
  - Five judges of the Constitutional Court declare amendments to the Constitutional Court Procedure Act to be unconstitutional. The amendments passed by the legislature requires ten judges to constitute a quorum. Three of the eight sitting judges denounce the ruling as invalid.
- 24 December – A magnitude 6.0 earthquake hits off the coast of Taitung County, causing ceilings of a school and a store to collapse, walls to crack at a prison, and a fire to start at a building in Taitung City.
- 26 December – The Legislative Yuan launches impeachment proceedings against President Lai Ching-te.
- 27 December – A magnitude 7.0 earthquake off the coast of Yilan City.
- 29–30 December – China conducts live fire military drills, code-named "Justice Mission 2025", around Taiwan.

== Holidays ==
- 1 January – New Year's Day and Republic Day
- 25 January – 2 February – Chinese New Year
- 28 February – Peace Memorial Day
- 5 April – Children's Day and Tomb-Sweeping Day
- 1 May – Labour Day
- 31 May – Dragon Boat Festival
- 28 September – Confucius' Birthday
- 6 October – Mid-Autumn Festival
- 10 October – National Day
- 25 October – Retrocession Day
- 25 December – Constitution Day

== Deaths ==
- 7 January – Cheng Yu-cheng, 78, politician, member of the Legislative Yuan (1981–1987, 1990–1993, 2002–2005), heart attack.
- 8 January – Lin Cheng-fong, 75, politician, member of the Legislative Yuan (2005–2008) and mayor of Guishan City (1998–2005).
- 9 January – Lee Ching-tai, 82, Taiwanese–American physician and activist, president of the Formosan Association for Public Affairs (2006–2007).
- 14 January
  - Chen Ching-Po, Taiwanese–Japanese professional golfer, 93, sepsis.
  - Li Kuei-hsien, 87, poet.
- 16 January
  - Hsieh Shih-chien, 72, airline executive, president (since 2016) and chairman (since 2019) of China Airlines.
  - Huang Lin-kai, 32, convicted murderer and rapist, execution by shooting.
- 25 January – Huang Mao-zong, 81, judge, justice of the Judicial Yuan (2008–2016).
- 2 February – Barbie Hsu, 48, actress, pneumonia.
- 5 February – Cecilia Koo, 104, philanthropist and centenarian.
- 21 February – Kuo-ch'ing Tu, 83, poet and translator.
- 14 March – Chang Chen-huan, 65, actor (body discovered on this date).
- 24 March – Kuo Yao-chi, 69, politician, minister of the Public Construction Commission (2002–2005) and Transportation and Communications (2006), aortic dissection.
- 4 May – Hsu Li-nung, 106, military officer, minister of the Veterans Affairs Council (1987–1993).
- 3 June – Lin Cheng-chieh, 72, politician, member of the Legislative Yuan (1990–1996)
- 9 June – Wang Hsing-ching, 78, journalist, political commentator and cultural critic.
- 11 June – Stella Chen, 75, journalist and politician, member of the Legislative Yuan (1993–1995), cancer.
- 14 July – Chang Jung-lin, 40, pool player.
- 23 July – Paul Chiu, 83, economist and politician, finance minister (1996–2000) and vice premier (2008–2009). (death announced on this date)
- 4 August – Cho-yun Hsu, 95, Taiwanese-American historian.
- 18 August – Lin Chia-cheng, 73, politician, Minister of Examination (2004–2008) and the Research, Development and Evaluation Commission (2000–2004). (death announced on this date)
- 3 September – Cheng Ching-mao, 92, sinologist.
- 16 September – Ting Mao-shih, 99, diplomat, foreign minister (1987–1988).
- 18 September – Tjaikung Ruveljeng, 58, physician, cancer.
- 26 September – Chen Chien-jen, 86, politician, MP (1993–1996), minister of foreign affairs (1999–2000), and representative to the United States (2000–2004).
- 27 September – Chang Chun-hsiung, 87, politician, premier (2000–2002, 2007–2008), vice premier (2000–2008), and twice MP.
- 7 October – Yen Cheng-kuo, 50, actor (My Native Land, Growing Up, A Summer at Grandpa's).
- 14 October – Na Tang, 59, actress and yogi, lung cancer.
- 22 October – Emman Atienza, 19, Filipino–Taiwanese social media personality and mental health advocate, suicide by hanging.
- 31 October – Stanley Fung, 81, Hong Kong–Taiwanese actor (Lucky Stars).
- 13 November – Edgar Lin, 87, biologist, diplomat, and politician, MP (1992–1996), representative to the United Kingdom (2004–2007), and minister of environment (2000–2001).
- 17 November – Chen Yao-chang, 76, hematologist.
- 5 December – Chen Chin-hsing, 90, politician, MP (2002–2005), county magistrate of Hsinchu (1981–1989).
- 8 December – Lee Wen-pin, 97, cardiologist.
- 14 December - Yang Hsien, 75, folk singer, complications from a stroke.
- 30 December – Denny Tsao, 66, singer and actor (Westgate Tango).
- 31 December – Lin Chih-hsin, 89, artist.
