= 2026 in Taiwan =

- Decades: 2000s; 2010s; 2020s
- See also: Other events of 2026: History of Taiwan; Timeline; Years

Events from the year 2026 in Taiwan, Republic of China. This year is numbered Minguo 115 according to the official Republic of China calendar.

== Incumbents ==
=== Government ===
The national government, elected in 2024, continues.

- President: Lai Ching-te
- Vice President: Hsiao Bi-khim
- Premier: Cho Jung-tai
- Vice Premier: Cheng Li-chun
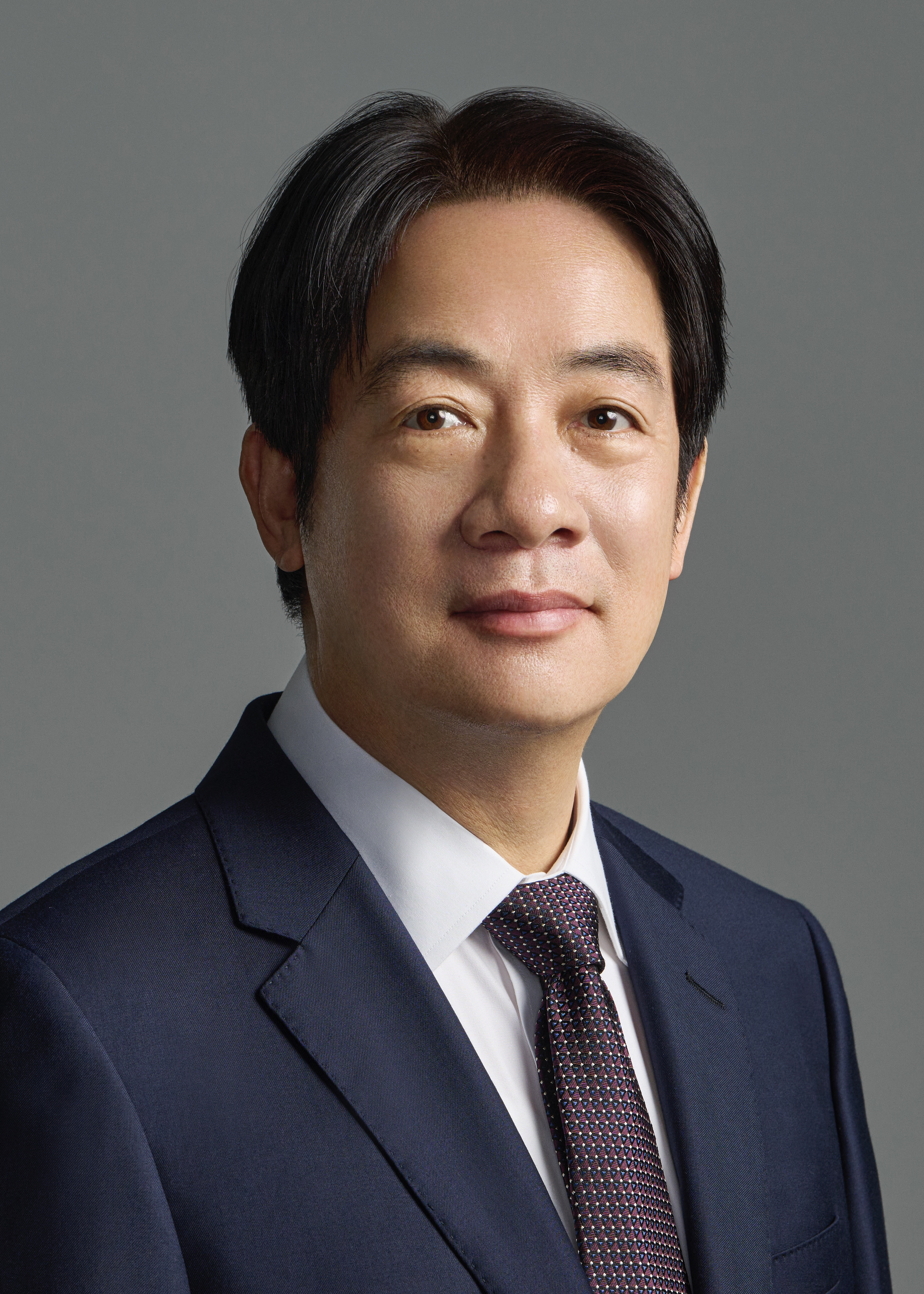
Lai Ching-te

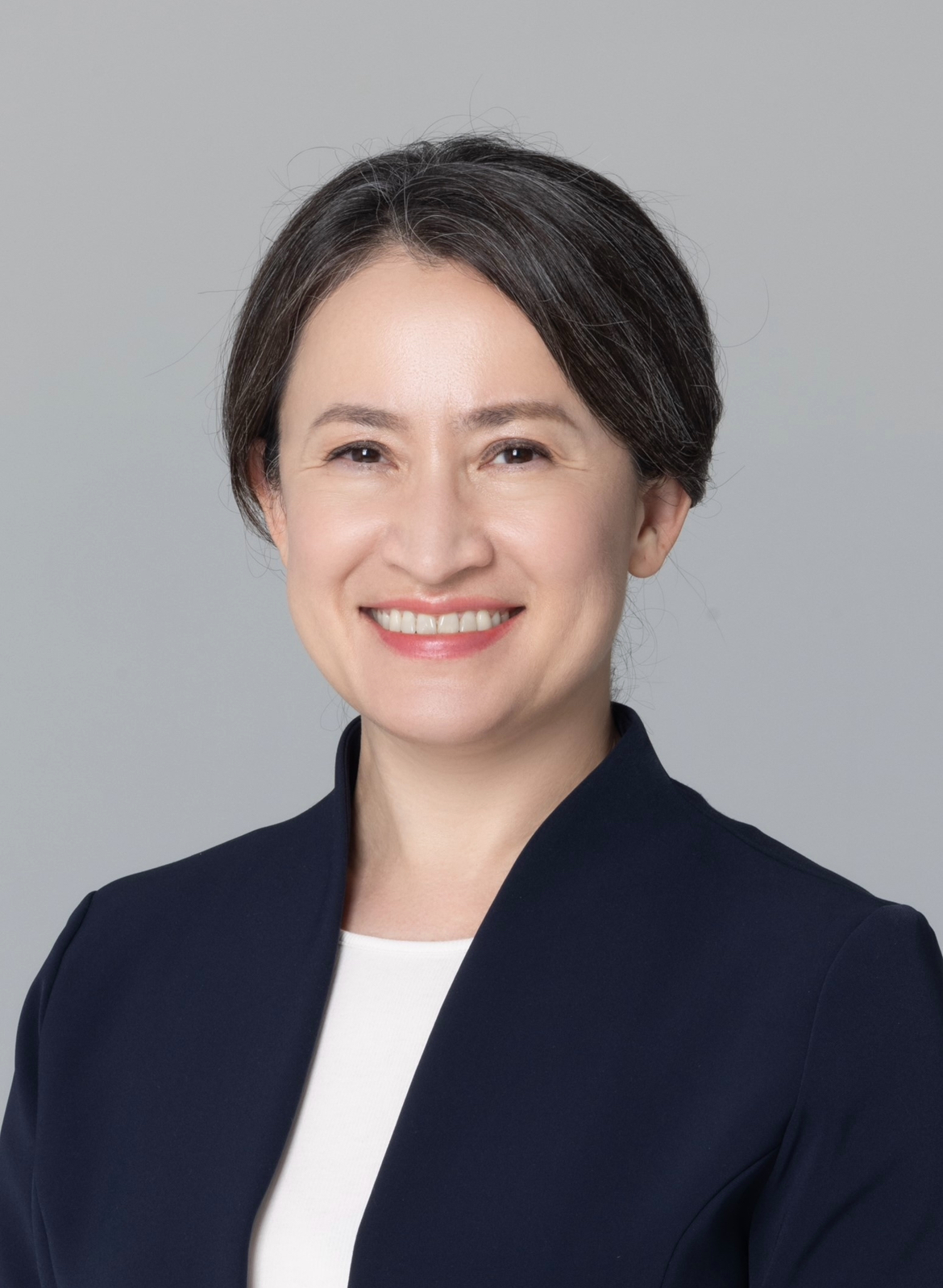
Hsiao Bi-khim

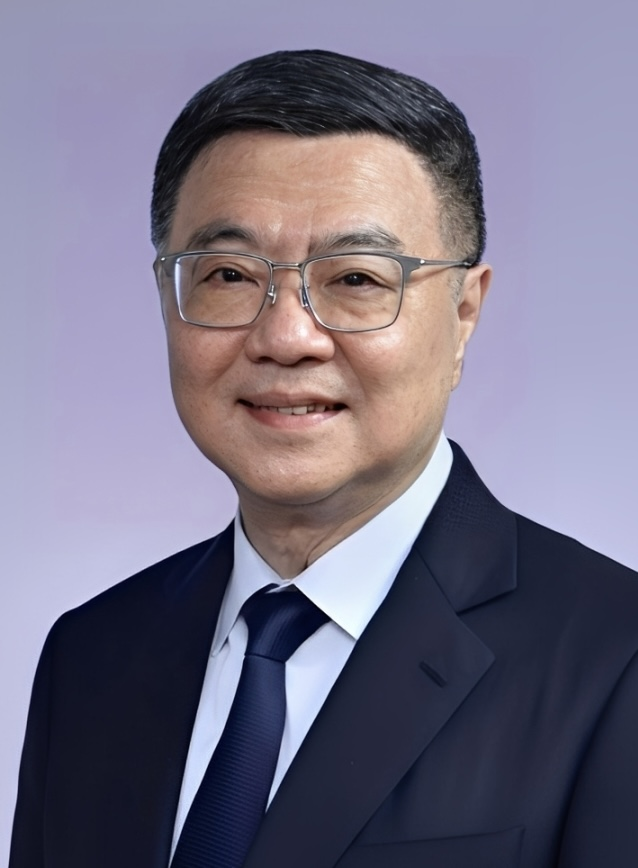
Cho Jung-tai

== Events ==
=== January ===
- 6 January – The Republic of China Air Force loses contact with the pilot of an F-16V fighter jet flying a routine training mission off Hualien County.
- 16 January – Taiwan and the United States sign a trade agreement for Taiwanese semiconductor and technology companies to invest US$250 billion in the US economy in return for the United States reducing its tariffs on Taiwanese exports from 20 to 15 percent.
- 17 January – A journalist is detained by a court in Ciaotou District on suspicion of bribing military officials to release sensitive information to individuals from mainland China.
- 25 January – Skyscraper Live (2026): American climber Alex Honnold becomes the first person to ascend Taipei 101 without using a rope or other protective equipment.
- 28 January – Control Yuan president, Chen Chu, resigns. She has been on leave since late 2024.

=== February ===
- 10 February – Prosecutors raid legislator Kao Chin Su-mei's office and summon her for questioning on suspicion of misappropriating her aides' salaries.
- 12 February – Taiwan agrees to remove or reduce 99% of its tariffs as part of a trade agreement with the United States.

=== March ===
- 4 March – Taiwanese prosecutors indict 62 people, including Chen Zhi, for their alleged links to the Prince Group, a multinational criminal network that operates scam centers in Cambodia. They also charge 13 companies with offences related to the criminal organization and money laundering.
- 26 March – The Taipei District Court sentences former Taipei mayor and presidential candidate Ko Wen-je to 17 years in prison for bribery charges.

=== April ===
- 23 April – Ocean Affairs Minister Kuan Bi-ling makes a visit to Taiping Island in the disputed Spratly Islands to oversee exercises by the Coast Guard Administration.
- 27 April – The Intellectual Property and Commercial Court sentences five people, including a former Tokyo Electron and TSMC employee, to up to 10 years' imprisonment and imposes a fine of NTD 150 million ($4.8 million) to Tokyo Electron for the transfer of trade secrets from TSMC to Tokyo Electron.

=== May ===
- 2 May – President Lai Ching-te arrives in Eswatini as part of a long-delayed visit marred by multiple African states refusing entry to their airspace for transit purposes.
- 19 May – Taiwan Travelogue, a novel written by Taiwanese writer Yang Shuang-zi and translated by Taiwanese-American Lin King, becomes the first work translated from Mandarin Chinese to win the International Booker Prize.

=== June ===
- 2 June – A T-34 Mentor trainer aircraft of the Republic of China Air Force crashes at Gangshan Air Force Base in Gangshan District, killing its two pilots.
- 9 June – Two people are killed in a gas explosion at a residential building in Hsinchu.
- 28 June – Six people are reported killed in flooding and landslides caused by Typhoon Mekkhala.

=== July ===
- 1 July — US President Donald Trump deploys the Navy-Marine Expeditionary Ship Interdiction System and Marine Air Defence Integrated System in the Luzon Strait and southern Japanese islands as part of the US military's regional war plan to defend Taiwan and deter a future Chinese invasion.
- 1 July — A massive recall of edible oil products manufactured by Central Union Oil Corporation is conducted. The products are found to contain excessive levels of benzopyrene during internal testing.
- 9 July — A massive fire breaks out at a metal factory in the Zhongli District of Taoyuan.
- 16 July – Papua New Guinea closes the Taipei Economic Office in Port Moresby, citing a desire to improve relations with mainland China.
- 24 July – The United States imposes a 10% tariff on Taiwan, citing the presence of alleged forced labor in the supply chain.

=== August ===
- 11 August – A court in New Taipei City sentences a woman who advocated for spouses born in mainland China to seven years' imprisonment for collusion with Beijing to influence political affairs in Taiwan.

=== October ===
- 24 October – Typhoon Champi hits Taiwan, killing one person and injuring more than 500.

=== November ===
- 4 November – A fire at a Panasonic factory in Hsinchu County kills two people and leaves five others injured.
- 17 November – Two Russian military aircraft briefly enter Taiwan's air defence identification zone, forcing the Republic of China Armed Forces to scramble fighter jets.
- 28 November – 2026 Taiwanese local elections

== Holidays ==
- 1 January – New Year's Day and Republic Day
- 16 – 20 February – Lunar New Year
- 28 February – Peace Memorial Day
- 4 April – Children's Day
- 5 April – Tomb-Sweeping Day
- 1 May – Labour Day
- 19 June – Dragon Boat Festival
- 25 September – Mid-Autumn Festival
- 10 October – National Day

== Deaths ==
- 9 January – Yao Chiang-lin, 75, politician, MNA (2005).
- 10 January – Lu Hsin-min, 85, politician, MLY (1993–2005).
- 13 January – Hun Yuan, 81, religious leader, founder of Weixinism.
- 2 February – Yuan Wei-jen, 57, singer-songwriter.
- 3 February – Wu Tun, 77, Bamboo Union member.
- 12 February –
  - Alfred Chen, 88, business executive and politician, MLY (2004–2005).
  - Fan Tsung-pei, 65, cellist and composer.
- 16 February – King Liu, 91, business executive, founder of Giant Bicycles.
- 20 February – Lee Yi-ting, 71, politician, MLY (2008).
- 27 March – Henry Lee, 87, forensic scientist and biochemist.
- 24 May – Timothy Yang, 83, minister of foreign affairs (2009–2012) and secretary-general to the president (2012–2015).
- 26 May – Samuel Yin, 75, conglomerate industry executive, founder of the Tang Prize.
- 26 July – Wang Kai, 43, actor.
- 31 July – Frank Huang, 76, business executive.
