= East Asian religions =

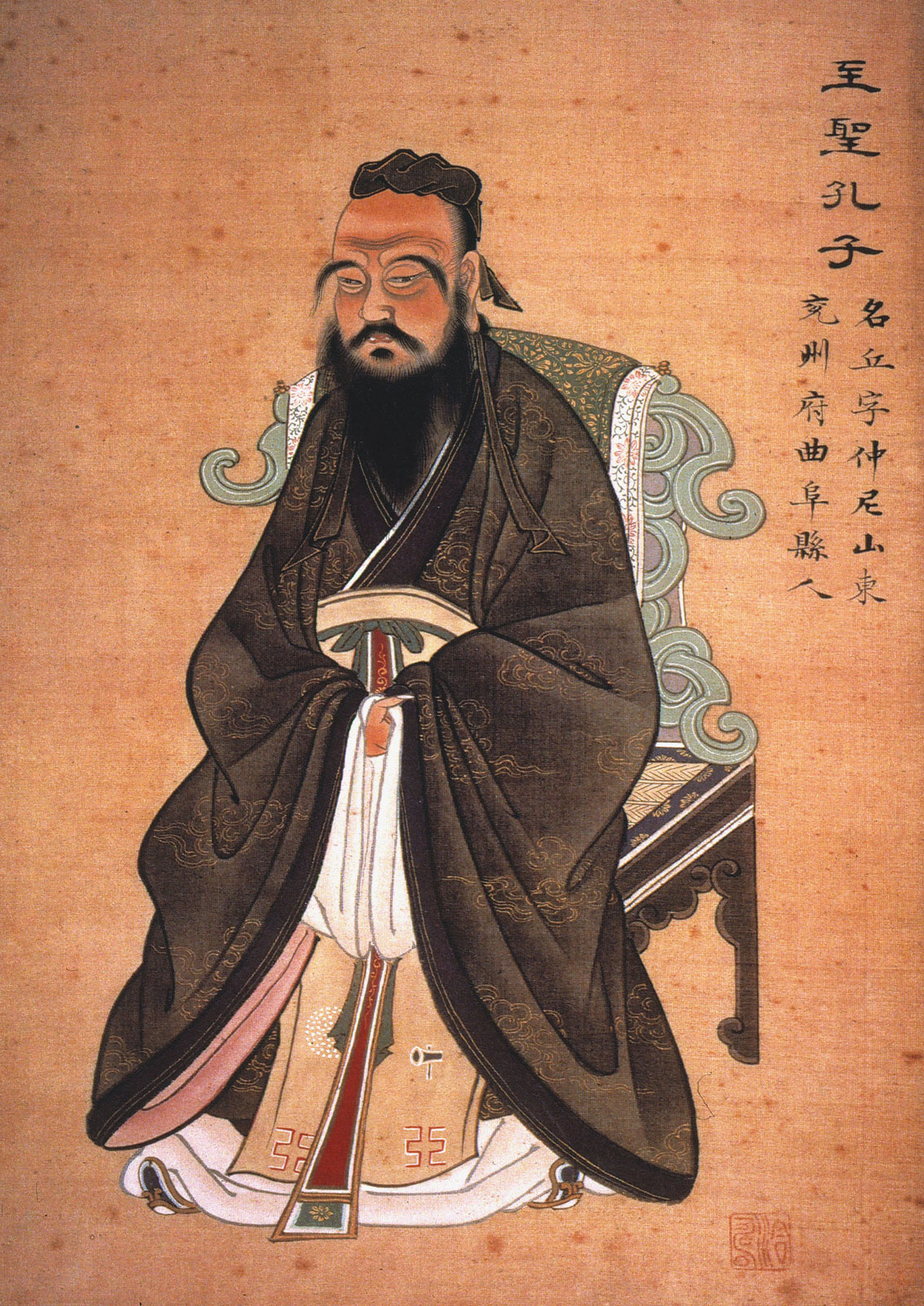
Confucius, filial piety encourage ancestor worship and further promote folk religion.

In the study of comparative religion, the East Asian religions, form a subset of the Eastern religions which originated in East Asia.

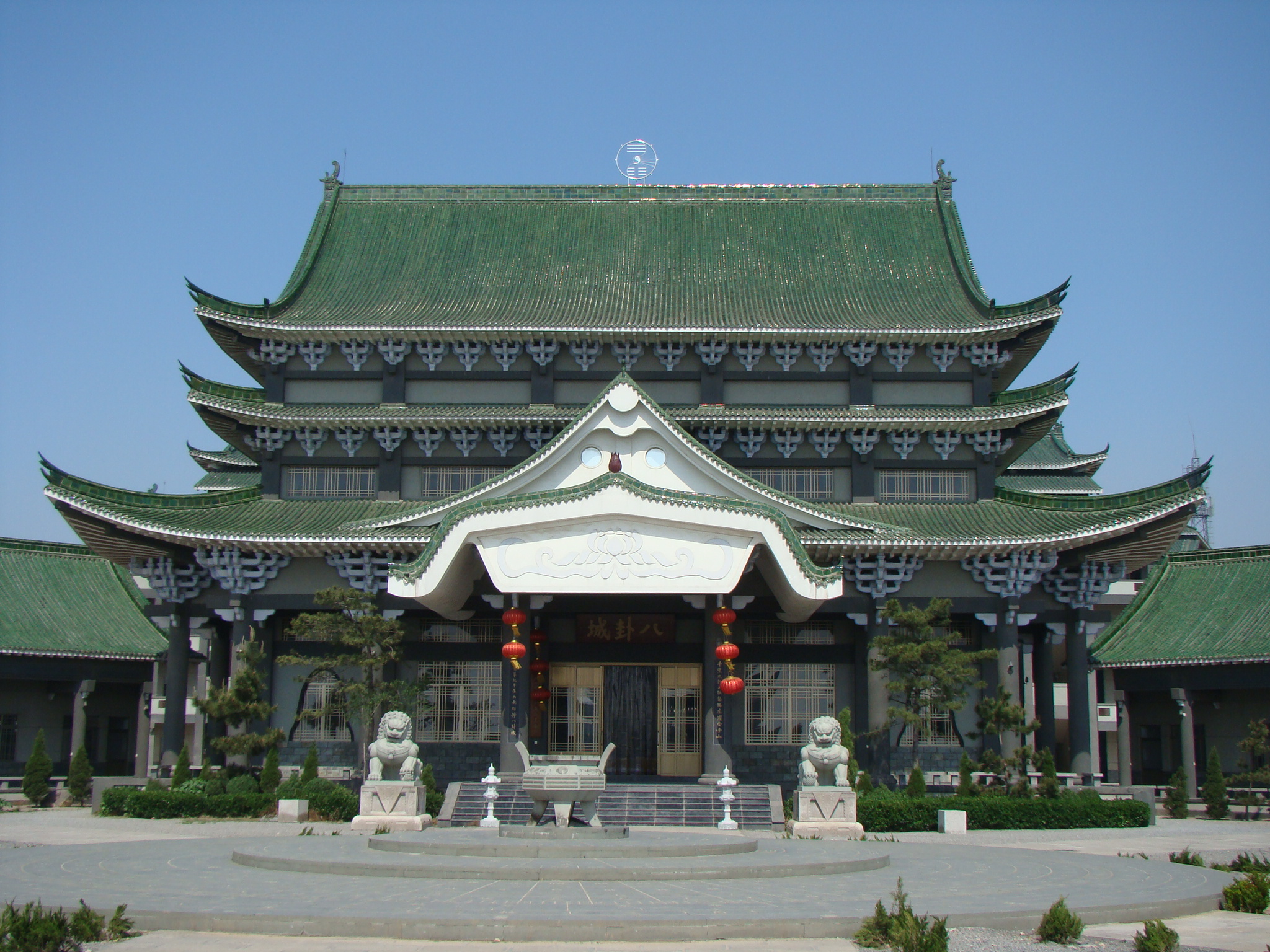
Main hall of the City of the Eight Symbols in Qi County, Hebi, the headquarters of the Weixinist Church in Henan. Weixinism is a Chinese salvationist religion.

This group includes Chinese religion overall, which further includes ancestor veneration, Chinese folk religion, Confucianism, Taoism and popular salvationist organisations (such as Yiguandao and Weixinism), as well as elements drawn from Mahayana Buddhism that form the core of Chinese and East Asian Buddhism at large. The group also includes Shinto and Tenrikyo of Japan, and Korean Shamanism, all of which combine shamanistic elements and indigenous ancestral worship with various influences from Chinese religions. Chinese salvationist religions have influenced the rise of Japanese new religions such as Tenriism and Korean Jeungsanism; as these new religious movements draw upon indigenous traditions but are heavily influenced by Chinese philosophy and theology. All these religious traditions generally share core concepts of spirituality, divinity and world order, including Tao ('way') and De ('virtue').

The Shang dynasty of ancient China worshipped their ancestor, Shangdi ('Highest emperor'). The Shang dynasty was defeated by the Zhou dynasty, whose deity, Tian ('Heaven'), emphasized virtue. However, rather than replacing or excluding Di, Tian spared Shangdi and encouraged ancestor worship instead. This symbolizes how Confucianism, while emphasizing virtue and condemning barbarism, did not replace existing beliefs and traditions.

Early Chinese philosophy proposed its own concept of Tao (the Way) to define virtue. The Hundred Schools of Thought, the ancient Chinese philosophical movement that sought to articulate the Tao, eventually consolidated into Confucianism and Taoism. Together with Buddhism arrived from India, these traditions came to be regarded as the Three Teachings or Three Ways, fostering a pluralistic religious framework across East Asia. Consequently, while terms incorporating Tao—such as Shinto, Pungryudo—appear throughout the East Asian religious landscape. East Asian religions include many theological stances, including polytheism, nontheism, henotheism, transtheism, pantheism, panentheism and agnosticism.

The place of East Asian religions among major religious groups is comparable to the Abrahamic religions found across the classical world, and Indian religions across the Indian subcontinent, Tibetan Plateau and Southeast Asia.

== Terminology ==
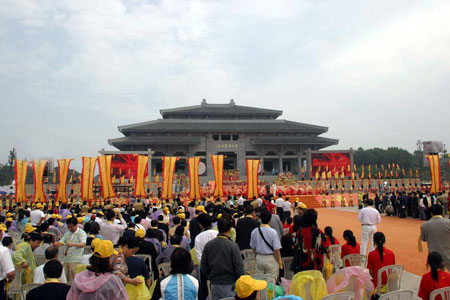
Worship ceremony at the Great Temple of Yandi Shennong in Suizhou, Hubei – an example of Chinese folk religion

Despite a wide variety of terms, the traditions described as "Far Eastern religions", "East Asian religions" or "Chinese religions" are recognized by scholars as a distinct religious family.

Syncretism is a common feature among East Asian religions, often making it difficult to recognize individual faiths from one another: practitioners frequently draw on multiple traditions at once, and deities, rituals, and doctrines are shared, adapted, and transformed across religious boundaries rather than confined or bound to a single system. Further complications arise due to the inconsistent use of many terms. For example, "Tao religion" is used for both Taoism itself and for the many Tao-based new religious movements that have emerged.

Similarly, "Far Eastern religion" or "Taoic religion" may refer only to faiths incorporating the concept of Tao, may include Chan and Japanese Buddhism, or may inclusively refer to all Asian religions.

== Philosophy ==
=== Confucianism ===
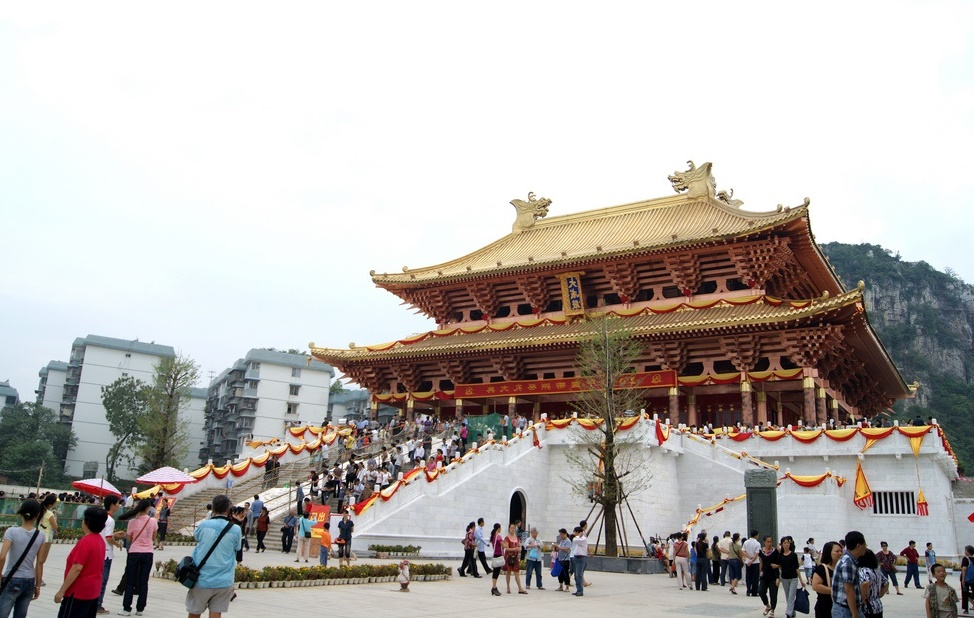
Temple of Confucius in Liuzhou, Guangxi.

Confucianism is a complex system of moral, social, political thought, influential in the history of East Asia. It is commonly associated with legalism, but actually rejects legalism for ritualism. It also endorses meritocracy as the ideal of nobility. Confucianism includes a complicated system governing duties and etiquette in relationships. Confucian ethics focus on familial duty, loyalty and humaneness.

Confucianism recognises the existence of ancestral spirits and deities, advocating paying them proper respect. Confucian thought is notable as the framework upon which the syncretic Neo-Confucianism was built.

Neo-Confucianism was developed in reaction to Taoism and Chan Buddhism. It was formulated during the Song dynasty, but its roots may be traced to scholars of the Tang dynasty. It drew from Buddhist religious concepts and Taoist yin yang theory, as well as the Yijing, and placed them within the framework of classic Confucianism. Despite Neo-Confucianism's incorporation of elements of Buddhism and Taoism, its apologists decried Nirvana and Xina('immortal').

At the same time, however, Neo-Confucianism encouraged ancestor worship and, by extension, fostered the development of local or indigenous religions. Japan actively supported indigenous beliefs to refine Shinto, while China condemned Taoism yet simultaneously sponsored and supported it. In contrast, the Joseon dynasty in Korea uniquely condemned native shamanism and sought to exclude local religions. As a result, Korean shamanism largely faded in Korea, paving the way for the entry and spread of Christianity.

These differences stemmed from how each dynasty approached the Hua–Yi distinction. Hua–Yi distinction refers to a worldview that strictly distinguishes between Sinic civilization and barbarianism; based on this distinction, religions and customs were categorized as either orthodox or heterodox, with the latter being actively suppressed. China considered Chinese folk religion and Taoism to be within the realm of shine and treated them as orthodox. Japan’s Huayi thought, as well as the concepts of Sinocentrism in Vietnam and Goryeo dynasty in Korea, viewed their respective lands as alternative centers of civilization, regarding their own native customs as orthodox. In contrast, Joseon’s Sojunghwa ideology viewed native Korean customs as barbarian, striving to replace them with Chinese Neo-Confucianism to establish Joseon as the true successor to Sinic civilization. Based on this ideological framework, Goryeo's shamanic traditions came to be branded as heterodox and were systematically oppressed.

Neo-Confucianism was an officially endorsed philosophy for over five centuries, deeply influencing all of East Asia.

== Religions ==
=== Chinese folk religion ===
Chinese folk religion comprises a range of traditional religious practices of Chinese, including the Chinese diaspora. This includes the veneration of shen ('spirits') and ancestors, and worship devoted to deities and immortals, who can be deities of places or natural phenomena, of human behaviour, or progenitors of family lineages. Stories surrounding these gods form a loose canon of Chinese mythology. By the Song dynasty (960–1279), these practices had been blended with Buddhist, Confucian, and Taoist teachings to form the popular religious system which has lasted in many ways into the present day.

==== Taoism ====
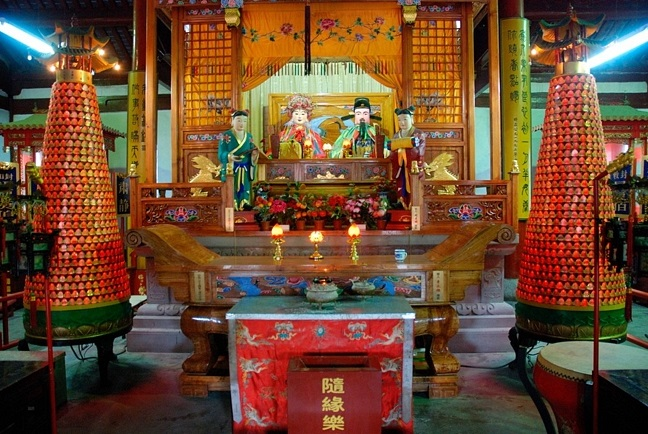
Altar to Shangdi (上帝 "Highest Deity") and Doumu (斗母 "Mother of the Great Chariot"), together representing the principle of the universe in masculine and feminine form in some Taoist cosmologies, in the Chengxu Temple of Zhouzhuang, Jiangxi.

The Tao may be roughly defined as the flow of reality, of the universe, or the force behind the natural order. Believed to be the influence that keeps the universe balanced and ordered, the Tao is associated with nature, due to a belief that nature demonstrates the Tao. It is often considered to be the source of both existence and non-existence.

The Tao is often associated with a "virtue" of being, the de or te. This is considered the active expression of Tao. Generally, those religions closer to Taoism explain de as "integrity" or "wholeness", while those faiths closer to Confucianism express this concept as "morality" or "sound character".

The concepts of Tao and de are shared by both Taoism and Confucianism. The authorship of the Tao Te Ching, the central book of Taoism, is assigned to Laozi, who is traditionally held to have been a teacher of Confucius. However, some scholars believe that the Tao Te Ching arose as a reaction to Confucianism. Zhuangzi, reacting to the Confucian-Mohist ethical disputes casts Laozi as a prior step to the Mohists by name and the Confucians by implication. However, secular scholars usually consider Laozi and Zhuangzi to have been mythological figures.

Early Taoist texts reject Confucian emphasis on rituals and order, in favour of an emphasis on "wild" nature and individualism. Historical Taoists challenged conventional morality, while Confucians considered society debased and in need of strong ethical guidance.

Taoism consists of a wide variety of religious, philosophical and ritual orders. There are hermeneutic (interpretive) difficulties in the categorisation of Taoist schools, sects and movements.

Taoism does not fall strictly under an umbrella or a definition of an organised religion like the Abrahamic traditions, nor can it purely be studied as a variant of Chinese folk religion, as much of the traditional religion is outside of the tenets and core teachings of Taoism. Robinet asserts that Taoism is better understood as a way of life than as a religion, and that its adherents do not approach or view Taoism the way non-Taoist historians have done.

In general, Taoist propriety and ethics place an emphasis on the unity of the universe, the unity of the material world and the spiritual world, the unity of the past, present and future, as well as on the Three Jewels of the Tao (love, moderation, humility). Taoist theology focuses on doctrines of wu wei ("non-action"), spontaneity, relativity and emptiness.

Traditional Chinese Taoist schools accept polytheism, but there are differences in the composition of their pantheon. On the popular level, Taoism typically presents the Jade Emperor as the head deity. Professionalised Taoism (i.e. priestly orders) usually presents Laozi and the Three Pure Ones at the top of the pantheon.

Worship of nature deities and ancestors is common in popular Taoism, while professional Taoists put an emphasis on internal alchemy. The Tao is never an object of worship, being treated more like the Indian concept of atman.

=== Shinto ===
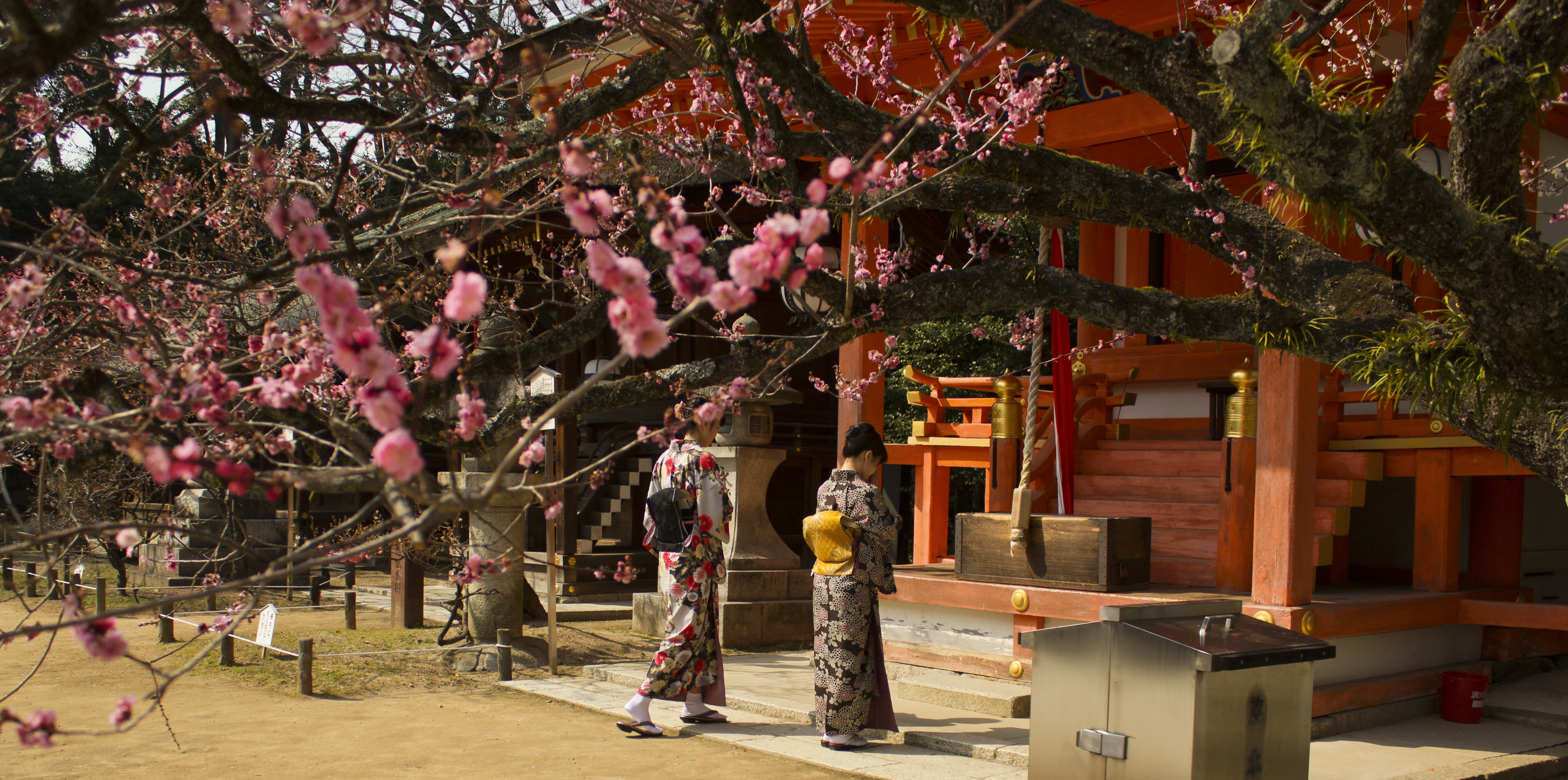
Two women praying in front of a Japanese Shinto shrine.

Shinto, japanese folk religion is the ethnic religion of Japan. Shinto literally means "Way of the gods". Shinto practitioners commonly affirm tradition, family, nature, cleanliness and ritual observation as core values.

Ritual cleanliness is a central part of Shinto life. Shrines have a significant place in Shinto, being places for the veneration of the kami (gods or spirits). "Folk", or "popular", Shinto features an emphasis on shamanism, particularly divination, spirit possession and faith healing. "Sect" Shinto is a diverse group including mountain-worshippers and Confucian Shinto schools.

=== Vietnamese folk religion ===
Vietnamese folk religion is a group of spiritual beliefs and practices adhered to by the Vietnamese people. About 86% of the population in Vietnam are reported as irreligious, but many among them practice folk religious traditions.

=== Korean shamanism ===
Korean shamanism, Musok(巫俗,shaman mores) is Korea’s native folk religion. Centered on ancestral veneration and ritual offerings, it addresses and resolves grief through shamanic rites (gut) accompanied by communal music and dance. Over time, it integrated elements of Confucianism, Buddhism, and Daoism, giving rise to Silla and Goryeo’s Pungryudo ('way of elegant mores') ideals.

=== Religious Confucianism ===
Religious Confucianism refers to the form of practicing Confucianism as a faith. In East Asia, Religious Confucianism was rare and was primarily observed by the sadaebu, the ruling group of Korea's Joseon dynasty. Driven by their faith in religious Confucianism, they oppressed their folk religion. Today, it can be found in Korea and Indonesia.

== Interaction with Buddhism ==
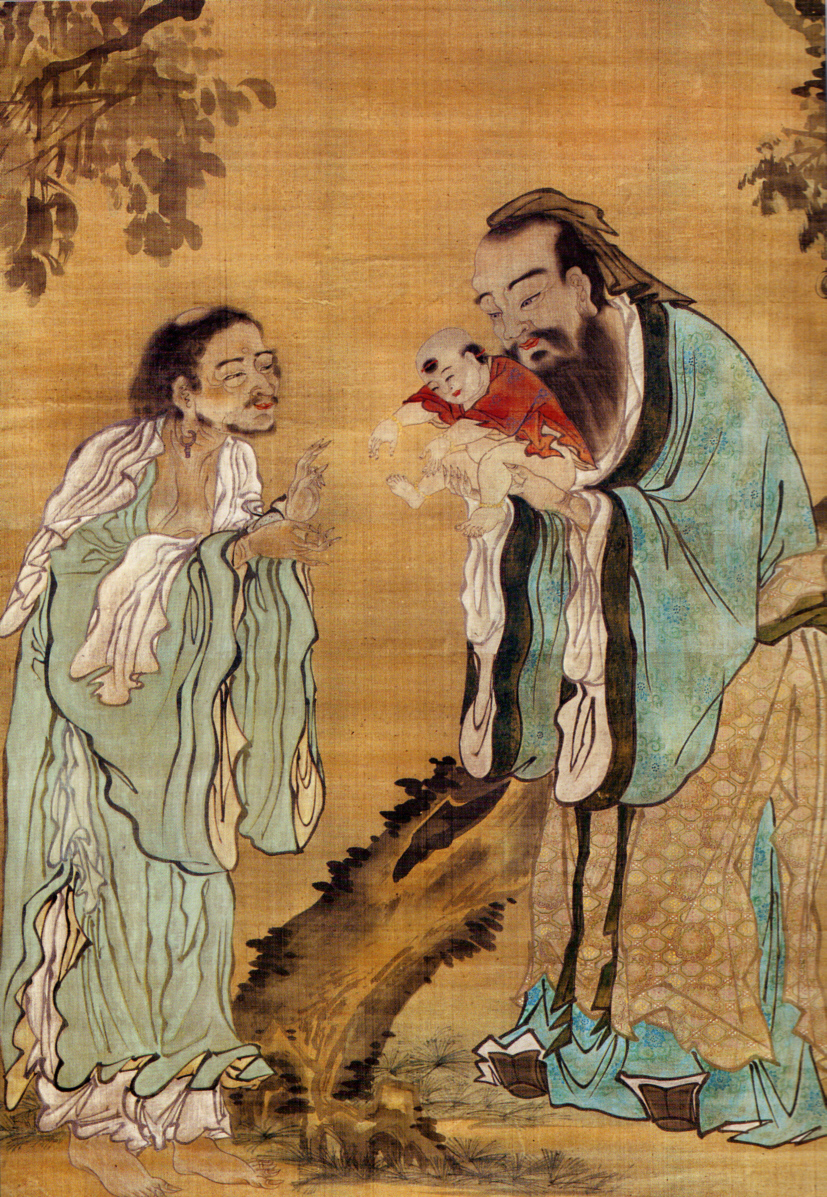
A painting of Confucius presenting a young Buddha to Laozi.

The entry of Buddhism into China from the Indian subcontinent was marked by interaction and syncretism with Taoism in particular. Originally seen as a kind of "foreign Taoism", Buddhism's scriptures were translated into Chinese using the Taoist vocabulary. Chan Buddhism was particularly modelled after Taoism, integrating distrust of scripture, text and even language, as well as the Taoist views of embracing "this life", dedicated practice and the "every-moment". In the Tang period Taoism incorporated such Buddhist elements as monasteries, vegetarianism, prohibition of alcohol, the doctrine of emptiness, and collecting scripture into tripartite organisation. During the same time, Chan Buddhism grew to become the largest sect in Chinese Buddhism.

The Buddha's "Dharma" seemed alien and amoral to conservative and Confucian sensibilities. Confucianism promoted social stability, order, strong families, and practical living, and Chinese officials questioned how monastic lifestyle and personal attainment of enlightenment benefited the empire. However, Buddhism and Confucianism eventually reconciled after centuries of conflict and assimilation.

Ideological and political rivals for centuries, Taoism, Confucianism, and Buddhism deeply influenced one another. They did share some similar values. All three embraced a humanist philosophy emphasising moral behavior and human perfection. In time, most Chinese people identified to some extent with all three traditions simultaneously. This became institutionalised when aspects of the three schools were synthesised in the Neo-Confucian school.

== See also ==
- Buddhist ethics
- Edo neo-Confucianism
- List of religions
- Religion in China
- Religion in Japan
- Religion in Taiwan
- Religion in Vietnam
- Religion in Korea
- Shinbutsu-shūgō
- Three teachings
