= 2027 in Taiwan =

- Decades: 2000s; 2010s; 2020s
- See also: Other events of 2027; History of Taiwan • Timeline • Years

Events from the year 2027 in Taiwan, Republic of China. This year is numbered Minguo 116 according to the official Republic of China calendar.

== Events ==
=== Predicted and scheduled ===
- 25 April–1 May – 2027 Men's Ice Hockey World Championships Division III Group A in Taichung
- July – 2027 International Chemistry Olympiad
- 7–13 November – 2027 Women's Ice Hockey World Championships Division II Group A in Taipei

== Holidays ==
- 1 January – New Year's Day and Republic Day
- 5 – 10 February – Lunar New Year
- 28 February – Peace Memorial Day
- 4 April – Children's Day
- 5 April – Tomb-Sweeping Day
- 1 May – Labour Day
- 9 June – Dragon Boat Festival
- 15 September – Mid-Autumn Festival
- 10 October – National Day
