= Lin Cheng-fong =

Taiwanese politician (1949–2025)

Lin Cheng-fong MLY
- 林正峰

Member of the Taoyuan City Council
- In office 25 December 2014 – 25 December 2022
- Constituency: Guishan District

Member of the Legislative Yuan
- In office 1 February 2005 – 31 January 2008
- Constituency: Taoyuan County

Mayor of Guishan City
- In office 1 March 1998 – 31 January 2005
- Preceded by: Tseng Chung-yi
- Succeeded by: Lu Hsueh-chi

Member of the Taoyuan County Council
- In office 1 March 1990 – 1 March 1998
- Constituency: Guishan City

Personal details
- Born: 1 December 1949 Taoyuan County, Taiwan
- Died: 8 January 2025 (aged 75)
- Party: Kuomintang
- Occupation: Politician

Lin Cheng-fong (Chinese: 林正峰; 1 December 1949 – 8 January 2025) was a Taiwanese politician.

== Life and career ==
Lin was raised in Guishan, Taoyuan, where he attended elementary school. He then enrolled at Wu-Ling Junior High School before graduating from Taoyuan Municipal Taoyuan Senior High School.

Lin was a member of the Guishan Farmers' Association and led the Shoushanyan Guanyin Temple. He was elected to the Guishan Township Council, then served on the Taoyuan County Council for two terms, from 1990 to 1998. He won the township's mayoral election later that year, and was reelected in 2002. Lin contested the 2004 legislative election as a Kuomintang candidate, and was seated to the Legislative Yuan as a representative of Taoyuan County. While a member of the Legislative Yuan, Lin drew attention to a budget proposed in 2005 for flood prevention. In 2007, the Liberty Times reported that Lin was considering leaving the Kuomintang, which he denied. After Taoyuan became a special municipality in 2014, he was elected to the first convocation of the Taoyuan City Council. During his first term, Lin raised questions about New Taipei residents dumping trash in Taoyuan. He was reelected to the Taoyuan City Council in 2018 and stepped down in 2022.

Lin was diagnosed with amyotrophic lateral sclerosis during his second term on the Taoyuan City Council, and died on 8 January 2025, at the age of 75. The next day, public visitation began, with the memorial service scheduled for 25 January 2025.
