= Hun Yuan =

Taiwanese new religious movement founder (1944–2026)

Grand Master Hun Yuan
- 混元禪師
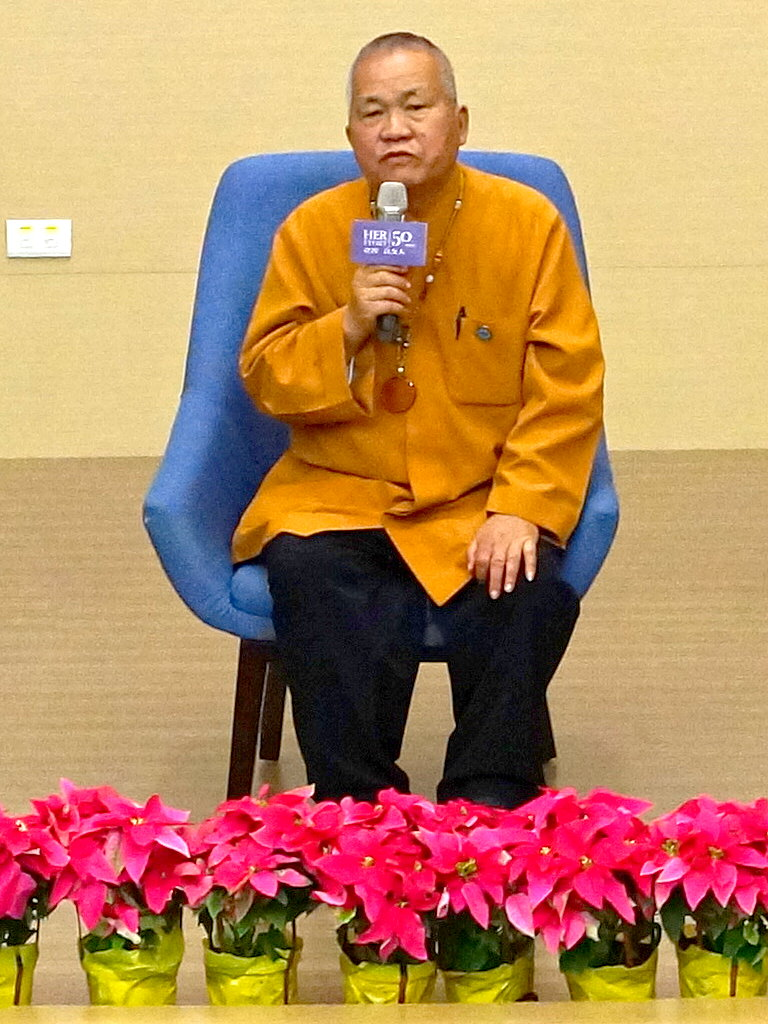
- Hun Yuan in 2021
- Born: Chang Yi-Jui; 2 February 1944; Zhongliao, Nantou, Taiwan, Japan
- Died: 13 January 2026 (aged 81)
- Known for: Founder of Weixinism

Chang Yi-Jui (2 February 1944 – 13 January 2026), later known as Grand Master Hun Yuan, was the founder of Weixinism, also known as Weixin Shengjiao, a Taiwanese new religious movement. He also authored several books on I Ching and Feng Shui, and was a painter. Before becoming a religious leader, he founded a land surveying company and taught engineering measurement. He also established I Ching University to teach I Ching and Feng Shui.

== Background ==
Chang Yi-Jui was born on 2 February 1944 in Zhongliao Township, Nantou County, Taiwan. For the first thirty-eight years of his life, he was not particularly interested in religion, although he developed an early interest in the traditional Chinese I Ching and Feng Shui. In 1963, he graduated at the Land Survey Department of Kuang-Hwa Senior Industrial Vocational High School in Taichung City, Taiwan. He remained in the School as a teacher of engineering measurement. He was also the founder of Zhong Xin Measuring Ltd., known as the first company of land surveying in Taiwan.

His business career came to an unexpected halt in 1982, when Chang fell seriously ill. He attributed his seemingly miraculous recovery to a divine intervention, and decided from then on to consecrate his life to religion. He claimed to have received revelations from Guiguzi, a name indicating a book of military strategy written between the late Warring States period and the end of the Han Dynasty and by extension its real or mythological author, later deified in Chinese folk religion. Chang then went to a pilgrimage to Mount Dawu, in Taitung County, Taiwan, accompanied by some friends. On the mountain, he claimed to have received a new revelation. He reported that the Jade Emperor, a popular character in Chinese folk religion, admonished him “never to be selfish” and to “encourage people for self-cultivation.

In 1983, Chang started putting his vow to devote his life to religion into practice. He opened a family hall called Yi Yao She in Taichung City, where he started teaching I Ching and offering divination services to the followers he had gathered. One year later, Yi Yao She was renamed Shennong Temple and Chang claimed to have received the Buddhist name and title “Grand Master Hun Yuan” by divine revelation. He claimed to be mystically united with the Bodhisattva Wang Chan Lao Zu, who had once incarnated on Earth as Guiguzi, and to receive regular revelations from him.

In 1987, martial law in Taiwan was lifted, and Grand Master Hun Yuan was allowed to expand its activities and eventually to legally register a movement known as Weixin Shengjiao, or Weixinism, literally “Sacred Teachings of the Heart (or Mind) Only.” The movement opened its new and larger headquarters in 1987 in Nantou County, where the Hsien Fo Temple was inaugurated. Eventually, it was followed by 42 branch temples, where religious rituals are performed and courses of I Ching and Feng Shui are offered on a regular basis. In 1993, Hun Yuan hold what he called the 99 Days Chanting Ceremony and taught his first research classes on I Ching and Feng Shui. The book Feng Shui World View, published in 1995, made Hun Yuan known to a larger public in Taiwan. In the same year, the convention “Propagating the Dharma of Feng Shui for the Home” at Linkou Stadium, Taipei, drew a crowd of 36,000.

Hun died on 13 January 2026, at the age of 81.

== Weixinism ==
Hun Yuan is primarily known as the founder and leader of Weixinism or Weixin Shengjiao, a Taiwanese new religion with a presence among the Chinese diaspora in other countries and with some Western followers in the United States, Canada, Australia, and Spain; its global membership is "about 300,000, with a larger audience estimated by Taiwan's Ministry of Internal Affairs at 1,000,000". Weixin Shengjiao has been described as an institutionalization of traditional Chinese folk religion, centered on the worship of Guiguzi and of the Three Chinese Ancestors, the Yellow Emperor, Yandi and Chiyou, and on the divulgation of I Ching and Feng Shui as systems of practical and not only philosophical wisdom.

The canon of Weixin Shengjiao includes scriptures of Buddhism, Confucianism, and Taoism, as well as the large corpus of revelations Hun Yuan claims to receive from Guiguzi, collected in the sixteen volumes of the Apocalypse Sutra. All the speeches and writings, and in fact all the daily utterances, of Hun Yuan, are collected in the Weixin Dao Zang, which, by 2017, had reached the extraordinary size of more than 18,000 volumes. In addition, Hun Yuan is the author of several volumes popularizing I Ching and Feng Shui. One, collecting his Yang House Feng Shui Lectures, was translated into English in 2016 with the title Gui Gu Zi Heart Dharma in Taiwan: Yang House Feng Shui Lectures.

== Education facilities ==
In 1996, Hun Yuan founded a continuing education facility known as I Ching University, while the parallel institution Weixin College served as an academic facility for the study of I Ching and Feng Shui and was accredited as a university by the Ministry of Education (Taiwan) in 2013. In 2015, I Ching University stated that, from its foundation, it had completed twenty-three year-long courses, and the number of its students had exceeded sixty thousand. In 2016, I Ching University started acknowledging “pingxin virtuous fellows,” i.e. students who had studied there for 24 years.

== Television programs ==
In 1997, Hun Yuan started what would become a long career as teacher of I Ching and Feng Shui via television. He became a familiar face to Taiwanese television viewers, and in 1998 presented his ideas overseas through his first international tour.

== Humanitarian activities ==
In 1996, Hun Yuan founded the “Pure Land in This World Chinese Merit Foundation.” Its original aim was to propagate I Ching and Feng Shui. In 1999, however, the devastating 1999 Chi-Chi earthquake struck Taiwan. Hun Yuan mobilized the members of the Foundation and sent them to the afflicted areas. They taught how to rebuild anti-seismic public buildings and homes by using the principles of Feng Shui and also provided help to affected families. The movement reported that the number of Taiwanese families that received help from the Foundation exceeded three thousand. In 2012, the name of the Foundation was changed to “Weixin Shengjiao Merit Foundation.” According to the movement, the current number of members is around sixty thousand.

== Relations between Taiwan and China ==
In 2001, with the stated aim of improving the relationships between Taiwan and China, Hun Yuan organized in Taipei what became the first of a series of annual conferences on Guiguzi, featuring scholars from the two sides of the Taiwan Strait and reached an agreement with the authorities of the Chinese province of Henan to build there a Town of Chinese Culture, or City of Eight Trigrams (a name derived from the I Ching), featuring several temples.

In 2003, Hun Yuan established the Gui Gu Zi Academic and Research Association, whose stated aim is to trace the origins and foundations of Chinese culture. In particular, the Association compiled a list of 15,615 Chinese family clan names, 917 names of emperors who ruled in China, and 3,762 wars which plagued Chinese history. For Hun Yuan, collecting these names does not serve a purely scholarly purpose but also a religious one. In 2004, he organized in the Linkou Stadium, Taipei, the first “Unified Ancestor Worship Ceremony for Chinese in the 21st Century,” honoring all the ancestors of the Chinese peoples, particularly those who had died in different wars. Crowds in excess of 30,000 attend these ceremonies held each year on January 1; Presidents of the Republic of Taiwan and other senior political leaders have also participated in the events.

In 2012, Wu Ching-ji, then Taiwan's Minister of the Education, announced during a conference on Feng Shui that Hun Yuan had been nominated as a candidate for the 2013 Nobel Peace Prize (which was finally awarded to the Organisation for the Prohibition of Chemical Weapons).

== Artistic production ==
Hun Yuan, The Stable Nation of the Golden Dragon

Hun Yuan was also a prolific painter. Although rooted in the tradition of Chinese calligraphy and ink wash painting, his large works, often depicting dragons, are realized in a distinctive style. He often demonstrated publicly how they are produced in a few seconds with a single brush stroke applying black ink to Xuan paper. All branch temples of Weixin Shengjiao store paintings by Hun Yuan, but the largest collection is now at Weixin Museum, a museum that is part of Weixin Shengjiao's headquarters in Nantou County. Critics, and the movement itself, regard as most significant the 108 pieces of dragon-shaped ruyi ("auspicious," literally “everything goes as one wishes”) calligraphy, including the frequently reproduced The Stable Nation of the Golden Dragon.

Hun Yuan also produced designs for building and gardens. The movement reported that the landscape design of the Hsien Fo Temple was based on a project by Hun Yuan, who insisted that the layout of the buildings should correspond with the shape of the nearby mountains to create a feeling of harmonious unity, based on both Feng Shui and Zen. According to the movement, Hun Yuan also supplied designs for the two Eight Trigrams Holy Cities that Weixin Shengjiao is building in Henan, China and in Nantou County, Taiwan.

== See also ==
- Weixinism
- Chinese folk religion
- Chinese salvationist religions
- Hunyuanvideo A generative AI video model by Tencent

== Hun Yuan's works translated into English ==
- The New Religion of the World Taiwan Weixin Shengjiao (2016). Guoxing (Taiwan): Weixin Shengjiao Hsien-Fo Temple of Chan-Chi Mountain; New Taipei City (Taiwan): Weixin Shengjiao Charity Foundation; and Guoxing Township, Nantou County (Taiwan): Weixin Shengjiao College.
- Gui Gu Zi Heart Dharma in Taiwan: Yang House Feng Shui Lectures (2016). Guoxing Township, Nantou County (Taiwan): Weixin Shengjiao Chan Chi Mountain Hsien Fo Temple. ISBN 978-986-7007-61-2.
