= Huang Mao-zong =

Taiwanese judge (1944–2025)

- 黃茂榮

Justice of the Judicial Yuan
- In office 1 November 2008 – 31 October 2016

Personal details
- Born: 11 January 1944
- Died: 25 January 2025 (aged 81)
- Party: Independent
- Education: National Taiwan University (LLB, LLM); University of Tübingen (JD)
- Occupation: Legal scholar Judge

Huang Mao-zong (Chinese: 黃茂榮; 11 January 1944 – 25 January 2025) was a Taiwanese judge.

Huang earned a Bachelor of Laws degree at the National Taiwan University College of Law and pursued further legal studies at the University of Tübingen. Huang later returned to the NTU College of Law as faculty, and attained a distinguished professorship. An independent, he served as a justice of the Judicial Yuan from 2008 to 2016.

Huang died on 25 January 2025, at the age of 81.
