= Kuo-ch'ing Tu =

Taiwanese poet and scholar (1941–2025)

Kuo-ch'ing Tu (Chinese: 杜國清; pinyin: Du Guoqing; 1941 – 21 February 2025) was a Taiwanese poet, scholar, translator, critic, and professor. He was a Professor Emeritus in the East Asian Languages and Cultural Studies Department at the University of California, Santa Barbara, where he held the Lai Ho and Wu Cho-liu Endowed Chair from its establishment in 2003 until his retirement in 2020. He was also founder and director of the Center for Taiwan Studies. In 1996, he founded the biannual journal Taiwan Literature: English Translation Series《台灣文學英譯叢刊》, and remained its editor.

== Life and career ==
Tu was born in Taichung, Taiwan in 1941. He graduated from National Taiwan University in 1963 with an English Literature degree and earned a Master of Arts in Japanese literature from Kwansei Gakuin University in 1970. He obtained his Ph.D. in Chinese Literature from Stanford University in 1974. His research interests have included Taiwanese Literature, Chinese literature, Chinese literary theories, comparative literature, and international literatures in Chinese.

As a literary scholar, he published several volumes of collected essays and one monograph in English, a study of the Tang dynasty poet, Li He, based on his Ph.D. dissertation. Tu's reputation as a translator was established in the 1960s and 70s with his renderings of Modernist verse and literary theory, particularly the work of T. S. Eliot and Charles Baudelaire. His translation of Les Fleurs du Mal remains a standard reference in the Chinese-speaking world. He also introduced James J. Y. Liu's English language studies of Chinese poetics by translating them into Chinese. Among contemporary Chinese-language poets, Tu Kuo-ch'ing was considered one of the most daring and honest with regard to matters of love and Eros, however his poetic oeuvre was highly diverse and his influence not limited to the expression of love with passion.

Tu Kuo-ch'ing published twenty-five collections of poetry, including editions published in Japan, China, and Korea. In his largest anthology, Light Shines Through the World of Dust, Illuminating the Myriad Objects光射塵方，圓照萬象 (2017), the verses are divided into three major categories and a total of eleven subcategories. The first major category “The Substance of Things” 體物篇carries on the long tradition of exposition on the nature of “things” or “objects in Chinese poetry. “Substance of Things” poems also find resonance in the “New Objectivity” school of Modernism which advocates for artistic engagement with the realities of life rather than with emotions or purely aesthetic experience.

A second major mode of poetic expression is what Tu refers to as “Following Emotions” 緣情. This term derives from the classical expression “following the emotions to depict a scene” 緣情寫景 and implies that the poet feels emotions which are then projected unto external objects or scenery. Tu's verse in this mode relate to places from his youth or that he visited, especially in his extensive travels in Taiwan, China, Japan and North America. He also includes pieces composed in response to events in his life, or in the current news. Most notably, however, Tu considers that his extensive list of love-related verse belongs in this category.

Tu also makes use of verse as a medium of academic discourse. He gathers such work under the general heading of “Poetic Art” 詩藝篇. These works tend to be more intellectual than emotional. They include explorations of mythology, history and psychology as well as matters of more purely academic interest, such as poetics and literary theory.

Tu Kuo-ch’ing made a substantial contribution to poetic theory and practice by combining Eastern traditions with Western Modernist notions. His familiarity with T.S. Eliot and Charles Baudelaire inclined Tu towards the principles of Western Modernism. At the same time, he followed the lead of Japanese Modernist Nishiwaki Junzaburo in fusing European aesthetics with Eastern religious philosophy, especially the mysticism of Huayan (Flower Garland) Buddhism. Tu's familiarity with classical Chinese poetics, especially the work of medieval literary theorist, Liu Xie 劉勰, author of The Literary Mind and the Carving of Dragons 文心雕龍, allowed him to connect basic compositional devices such as the use of metaphor and symbolism with the long tradition of Chinese language verse. In these various ways, Tu Kuo-ch’ing's verse and criticism have played a central role in defining Modernist poetics in the post-WWII Chinese speaking world.

He co-edited Taiwan Literature: English Translation Series, and other CTS publications.

Tu retired in 2021 and was appointed Professor Emeritus. He died on 21 February 2025, at the age of 83.

== Works ==
=== Collections of poems and essays ===
- Wa ming ji [Voices of Frogs]. Taipei: Modern Literature Magazine, 1963.
- Dao yu hu [The Isle and the Lake]. Taipei: Li Poetry Society, 1965.
- Xuebeng [Avalanche]. Taipei: Li Poetry Society, 1972.
- Yi ying ji [Collected Poems Echoing Chen Ch'ien Wu: Images of a Youthful Woman]. Taipei: Li Poetry Society, 1974.
- Wang yue [Gazing at the Moon]. Taipei: Taiwan Elite Books, 1978.
- Li He [Li Ho] (Twayne's World Authors Series). Boston: Twayne Publishers, 1979.
- Xixie Shunsanlang de shi yu shixue [Nishiwaki Junzaburō's Poetry and Poetics]. Kaohsiung: Chunhui chubanshe, 1980.
- Xin yun ji [Heart-Cloud Collection]. Taipei: China Times Publishing Company, 1983.
- Xun mei de youhun [A Tormented Soul Martyred for Beauty]. Taipei: Li Poetry Society, 1986.
- Qingjie ji [A Lover's Doom: A Collection]. Taipei: Li Poetry Society, 1990.
- Qingjie [A Lover's Doom]. Beijing: China Federation of Literary and Art Circles Publishing Company, 1991.
- Du Guoqing zuopin xuanji [Selected Works of Du Guoqing]. Taichung: Taichung Cultural Center, 1991.
- Wuwangcao [Forget-me-not]. Beijing: People's Literature Publishing House, 1992.
- Dui wo, ni shi weixian de cunzai [To Me, You Are a Dangerous Existence]. Beijing: China Wenlian Publishing Company, 1996.
- Ai ran wu meng [Love Imbued with Desire: Five Dreams]. Taipei: Guiguan Publishing Company, 1999.
- Yu yan ji: Jinse wuduan wushi xian [Jade Smoke Collection: Fifty Variations on Li Shangyin's Songs of the Ornamented Zither]. Taipei: National Taiwan University Press, 2009.
- Shan he lüe ying [A Sweeping View of China's Mountains and Rivers]. Taipei: National Taiwan University Press, 2009.
- Taiwan shiren xuanji: Du Guoqing ji [Selected Works of Taiwan Poets: Tu Kuo-ch'ing]. Tainan: National Museum of Taiwan Literature, 2010.
- Shilun • shiping • shilun shi [Poetics, Poetic Critiques, and Poems of Poetics]. Taipei: National Taiwan University Press, 2010.
- Xila shenxuanqu [Lyrics on Greek Mythology]. Seoul: Baum Communications, 2014.
- Taiwan wenxue yu shihua wenxue [Taiwan Literature and World Literatures of Chinese]. Taipei: National Taiwan University Press, 2015.
- Guang she chen fang • yuan zhao wanxiang: Du Guoqing de shiqing shijie [Radiance Penetrates the Dusty Realm, Illuminating All Phenomenon: The Poetic World of Tu Kuo-ch'ing]. Taipei: National Taiwan University Press, 2017.

=== Collected essays ===
- Tui chuang wang yue: Du Guoqing sanwen ji [Pushing Open the Window, Gazing at the Moon: Du Guoqing's Prose Collection]. Taipei: National Taiwan University Press, 2019.

=== Translations in Chinese ===
- Ai Lüete wenxue pinglun xuanji [Collected Essays of T. S. Eliot]. Taipei: Taiwan Tianyuan Book Company, 1969.
- Shixue [Poetics], by Nishiwaki Junzaburō. Taipei: Taiwan Tianyuan Book Company, 1969.
- Riben xiandaishi jianshang [Appreciation of Modern Japanese Poetry]. Taipei: Issues #41-58, Li Poetry Magazine, February 1971-December 1973.
- Shi de xiaoyong yu piping de xiaoyong [The Use of Poetry and the Use of Criticism], by T. S. Eliot. Taipei: Pure Literature Publishing Company, 1972.
- E zhi hua [Flowers of Evil], by Baudelaire. Taipei: Pure Literature Publishing Company, 1977.
- Zhongguo shixue [The Art of Chinese Poetry], by James J. Y. Liu. Taipei: Youshi wenhua shiye chuban gongsi, 1977.
- E zhi hua [Flowers of Evil], by Baudelaire. Taipei: National Taiwan University Press, 2011.
- Zhongguo wenxue lilun [Chinese Theories of Literature], by James J. Y. Liu. Taipei: Linking Publishing Company, 1981.
- Mi Luoshu shixuan [Selected Poems of Czesław Miłosz]. Taipei: Vista Publishing Company, 1982.
- Zhongguo wenxue lilun [Chinese Theories of Literature], by James J. Y. Liu. Jiangsu: Jiangsu Education Press, 2006.

=== Translations in Korean ===
- Wangxiang [Nostalgia], 100 poems by Kuo-ch'ing Tu translated into Korean by Kim Sang-Ho. Seoul: Baum Communications, 2014.

=== Translations in Japanese ===
- Girisha shingenkyoku [The Greek Divine Lyrics], 64 poems translated into Japanese by Sadako Ikegami. Tokyo: Shichōsha, 2011.

== Studies on Kuo-ch'ing Tu's works ==
- Xunmei de lüren: Du Guoqing lun [A Traveler in Search of Beauty: A Study of Du Guoqing], by Wang Jingshou, Bai Shurong, Yang Zhengli. Beijing: Peking University Press, 1994.
- Ai de mitu: Du Guoqing qingshi lun [The Secret Map of Love: A Study of Du Guoqing's Love Poems], by Wang Zongfa, Ji Birui, and Wang Jingshou. Beifang Wenyi Chubanshe, 1994.
- Zuoye xingchen zuoye feng: yu yan ji zonglun [The Stars and Wind of Last Night: A Comprehensive Study on the Jade Smoke Collection], by Wang Zongfa. Anhui: Anhui University Press, 1998.
- Xunmei de lüren—Du Guoqing lun [A Traveler in Search of Beauty: A Study of Du Guoqing], by Wang Jingshou, Bai Shurong, Yang Zhengli. Taipei: Guiguan Publishing Company, 1999.
- Ai de mitu: Du Guoqing qingshi lun [The Secret Map of Love: A Study of Du Guoqing's Love Poems], by Wang Zongfa, Ji Birui, and Wang Jingshou. Taipei: Guiguan Publishing Company, 1999.
- Aiyu bo yang de shi jiao liliang—shilun Du Guoqing qingshi ji "airanwumeng" [The Poetic Effect of Eros Rising: On the Erotic Writing in Tu Kuo-ch'ing's Love Imbued with Desire: Five Dreams], translated by John Balcom. Taipei: Graduate Institute of Taiwan Literature, National Taiwan University Press, 2017.
- "Ke" cong hechu lai?—lun Du Guoqing "Shan he lüe ying" li de kuaguo jingyan yu wenhua ganhuai [Where Does the "Visitor" Come from? – On the Multinational Experience and Cultural Memory in Tu Kuo-ch'ing's Glimpses of Mountains and Rivers], translated by Ivan Yung-chieh Chiang. National Taiwan University Press, 2018.
- Du Guoqing "yi shi lunshi" de shixue guandian [The Poetics of Tu Kuo-ch'ing's "Poems about Poetry"], translated by John Balcom, National Taiwan University Press, 2019.
- Taiwan Literature: English Translation Series: Special Issue on Tu Kuo-ch'ing (台灣文學英譯叢刊，杜國清專輯）, edited by Terence Russell，#44，July 2019.
- "Introduction to the Special Issue on Tu Kuo-ch’ing" by Terence Russell in Taiwan Literature: English Translation Series: Special Issue on Tu Kuo-ch'ing, edited by Terence Russell, #44，July 2019. Pp.xvii-xxvi.
