= Sanxia car attack =

2025 motor vehicle incident in Taiwan

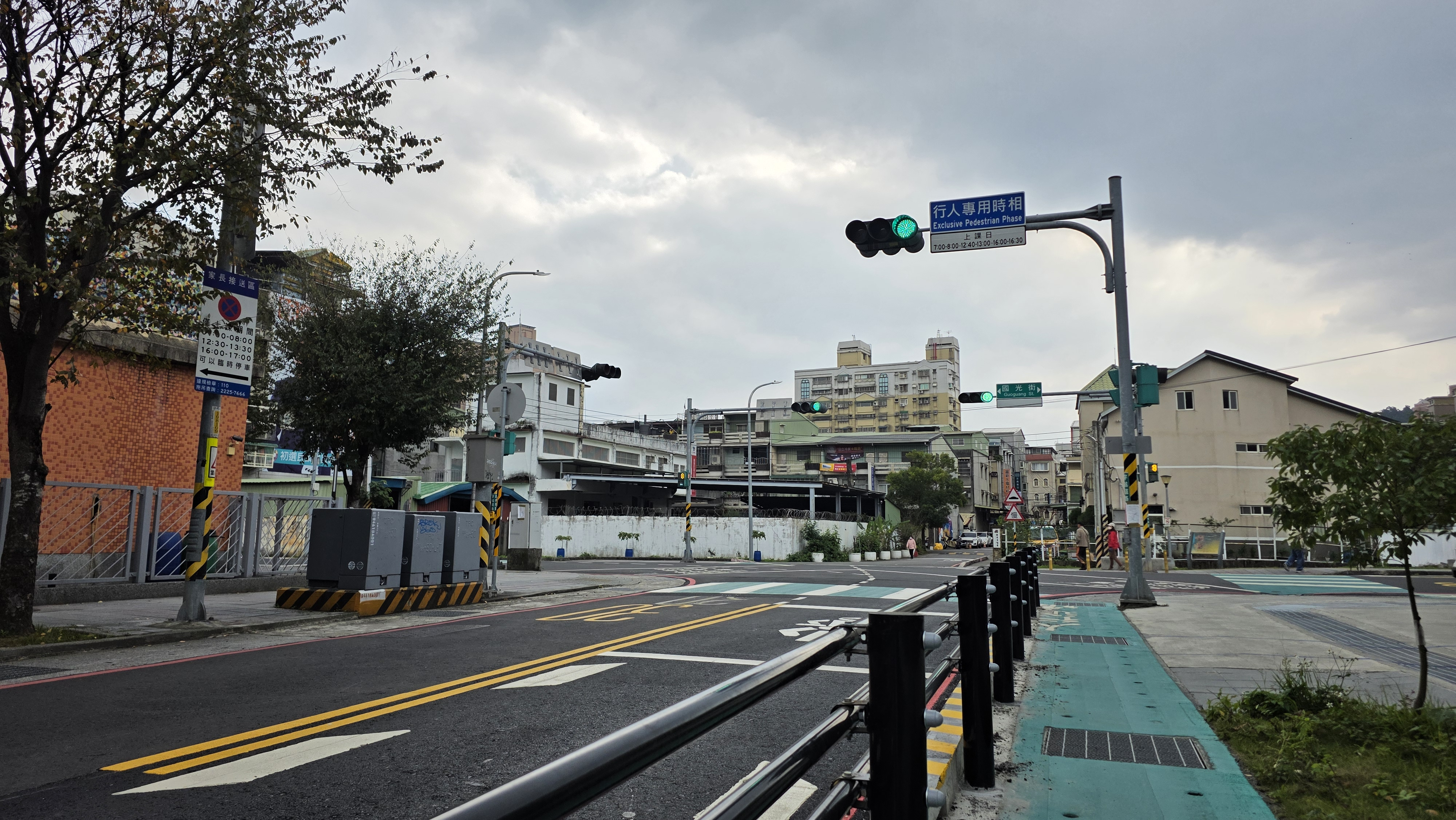
- The accident occurred at the intersection of Guocheng Street and Guoguang Street, nearby Beida Elementary School. (shot on January 8, 2026)

- Schematic map of the crash route and vicinity
- Location: 24.9392683°N 121.3725898°E; Guocheng street, Sanxia, New Taipei, Taiwan (Nearby Bei Da Elementary School)
- Date: May 19, 2025; 17 months ago c. 4:04 p.m. (UTC+8)
- Attack type: Vehicle-ramming attack
- Deaths: 4 (including the perpetrator)
- Injuries: 11
- Accused: Yu Wenzheng

The Sanxia car attack (Chinese: 新北市三峽區汽車衝撞攻擊事件) (Note: This incident is titled "A Passenger Car Colliding with Motorcycles and Pedestrians along Guocheng Street in Sanxia District of New Taipei City" by the Taiwan Transportation Safety Board (TTSB).) was a vehicle-ramming attack that occurred at approximately 4:04 p.m. on May 19, 2025, near the main entrance of Bei Da Elementary School (北大國小) on Guocheng Street (國成街) in Sanxia District (三峽區), New Taipei City (新北市), Taiwan. As of May 31, the incident has resulted in four deaths and eleven injuries.

== Incident ==
At approximately 4:04 p.m. on May 19, 2025, the suspect, Yu Wen-cheng (余文正), made a left turn at an intersection. After striking a traffic island and reversing into a vehicle behind him, he turned left again and entered Guocheng Street (國成街) in Sanxia District. Over the next 8 seconds, Yu drove at high speed without honking or stopping, sideswiping a cyclist and then plowing into multiple road users—including scooter riders, students, and pedestrians—at the intersection of Guocheng Street and Guoguang Street (國光街). He continued into Lane 132, Fuxing Road (復興路132巷), where he struck more pedestrians. The incident resulted in four deaths and eleven injuries.

After the crash, local shopkeepers, traffic patrol volunteers, teachers, and students rushed to the scene to assist, directing traffic, aiding the injured, and performing CPR on those who had no vital signs, trying to make use of the golden hour for emergency treatment.

Four individuals were without vital signs before arriving at the hospital. They included a 40-year-old woman surnamed Hung (洪), a scooter rider waiting at a red light, and three female students from Sanxia Junior High School (新北市立三峽國民中學): two 12-year-old girls surnamed Chang (張) and Wu (吳), and a 13-year-old girl surnamed Liu (劉). All three students were classmates. The girl surnamed Chang was successfully resuscitated by the medical team at Tucheng Hospital (新北市立土城醫院). The remaining three were declared dead after failed emergency treatment at the hospital. After undergoing two surgeries and 12 days of treatment in intensive care, Yu Wen-cheng was pronounced dead at 7:20 a.m. on May 31.

== Suspect ==
The perpetrator was Yu Wen-cheng (余文正), aged 78, a resident of Longxue Borough (龍學里), Sanxia District. He was a graduate of Tatung University and had worked for decades at Tatung Company, where he held executive positions, including board director, corporate representative, general manager of overseas subsidiaries, and board member of Elitegroup Computer Systems. He also served as a supervisor on the board of Tatung University.

Former colleagues at Tatung stated that Yu's demeanor would change significantly when driving—he often became anxious, irritable, and exhibited signs of road rage.

Yu was admitted to Far Eastern Memorial Hospital following the crash, where he remained in a coma under intensive care. He underwent multiple surgeries before dying of multiple organ failure at 7:20 a.m. on May 31.

== Aftermath ==
After colliding with a bicycle and hitting three standard heavy motorcycles and several pedestrians at the intersection of Guocheng Street (國成街) and Guoguang Street (國光街), Yu Wen-cheng continued driving along Lane 132, Fuxing Road (復興路132巷), where he again struck pedestrians before crashing into a traffic island and coming to a stop. The injured and out-of-hospital cardiac arrest (OHCA) patients were transported or made their way to En Chu Kong Hospital (恩主公醫院), Tucheng Hospital (土城醫院), and Far Eastern Memorial Hospital (亞東醫院) for treatment.

On the afternoon of May 20, 2025, the New Taipei District Prosecutors' Office (新北地檢署) conducted autopsies on the three deceased victims, confirming that all had died from internal organ rupture caused by blunt force trauma.

On May 31 at 7:20 a.m., Yu Wen-cheng was pronounced dead at Far Eastern Memorial Hospital after succumbing to severe injuries and multiple organ failure, despite medical intervention.

=== Judicial investigation ===
The Taiwan Transportation Safety Board(TTSB) classified the event as a major road accident and launched a formal investigation into the case. On May 20, 2025, the TTSB successfully retrieved the event data recorder (EDR) from Yu's vehicle.

On July 14, 2025. the New Taipei District Prosecutors' Office concluded its investigation into the incident. After examining the vehicle condition, Yu's health, and dashboard footage, prosecutors determined that the vehicle was functioning properly, and Yu was not under the influence of alcohol or drugs. Although Yu suffered from chronic illnesses, there was no evidence that his condition impaired his consciousness at the time. Investigators found that Yu had accelerated to over 100 km/h without braking or warning, despite driving through a densely populated school zone during student dismissal hours.

Prosecutors concluded that Yu's actions constituted "oblique intent to kill" (不確定殺人故意), a legal concept under Taiwan's criminal code indicating conscious disregard for life-endangering consequences. However, due to Yu's death from injuries sustained in the crash, no indictment was issued, and the case was closed under Taiwan's Criminal Procedure Code.

=== Government response ===
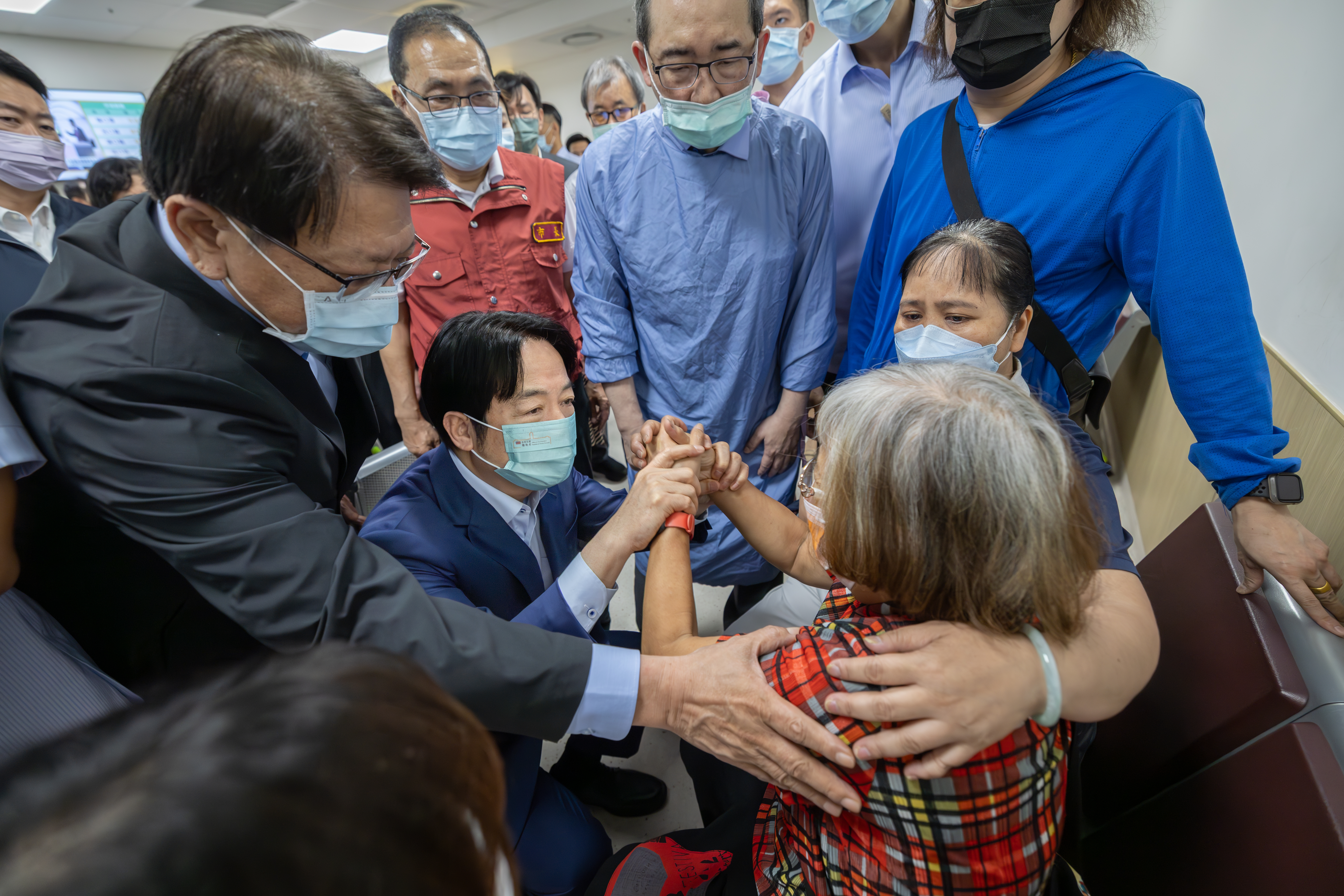
President William Lai (賴清德) visits victims' families at the hospital.

On the afternoon of May 19, New Taipei City Mayor Hou You-yi (侯友宜) rushed to the hospital to visit the injured, stating that "saving lives is the top priority" and emphasizing that treating the victims was the immediate task at hand. Mayor Hou also instructed the police to form a special investigation task force and ordered a thorough investigation into the incident. That evening, President William Lai and Premier Cho Jung-tai visited several hospitals to express condolences and meet with the injured and their families. They were accompanied by Minister of Education Cheng Ying-yao and Legislator Su Chiao-hui. Some family members of the victims petitioned the president directly, calling on the government to address the potential traffic hazards posed by elderly drivers and to propose legal reforms to prevent similar tragedies in the future.

Executive Yuan Spokesperson Lee Hui-chih (李慧芝) later stated that Premier Cho was deeply saddened by the incident and had instructed the Ministry of Health and Welfare (衛生福利部) to launch an emergency medical response project. Relevant government resources were mobilized to treat the injured, and all agencies were ordered to assist the families and promptly determine the cause of the crash.

On May 20, during a New Taipei City Council session, Councilor Lee Yu-hsiang (李宇翔) questioned whether Yu Wen-cheng (余文正) — who had been recognized as a Model Father of Sanxia District (三峽區模範父親) in 2022 — should have his honorary status revoked. In response, the New Taipei City Department of Social Welfare (社會局) announced that Yu no longer met the criteria for such recognition and that his Model Father title would be immediately rescinded. That same morning, President William Lai also addressed the nation during a speech marking the first anniversary of his inauguration. Before beginning his formal remarks, he expressed his concern over the tragic incident that had occurred the previous day.

=== Political reactions and proposed reforms ===
On May 20, during a plenary session of the Legislative Yuan, Vice President of the Legislative Yuan Johnny Chiang called for a one-minute silent tribute from all legislators to mourn the victims.

Legislative caucuses from all major political parties called for traffic policy reform. Democratic Progressive Party Legislator Rosalia Wu stated that the party caucus had already begun studying ways to improve policies concerning elderly drivers. The party planned to hold public hearings to gather opinions from various sectors, including reforms to license renewal, driver education, and training programs.

The DPP also proposed incentives such as subsidies for refresher courses or re-education programs to encourage elderly drivers to undergo proper training.

Kuomintang Legislator Chen Yu-jen (陳玉珍) suggested a comprehensive review of the "Road Safety Project (道安專案)", calling for strengthened regulations on elderly, drunk, and drug-impaired driving. She advocated for stricter license renewal thresholds for seniors, including evaluations of vision and reaction time, to prevent future tragedies. She also recommended that the government plan alternative transportation options, such as taxi subsidies or community shuttles, to ensure both safety and convenience.

On May 21, 2025, a joint press conference titled "No More Going Through the Motions: Mandatory Retraining and Elimination of Dangerous Drivers" was held in front of the Executive Yuan (行政院) by leaders of multiple parties and civic groups. Participants included New Power Party Chairwoman Wang Wan-yu , Secretary-General Lin Yi-hsuan (林邑軒), Taiwan Statebuilding Party Secretary-General Wu Hsin-tai (吳欣岱), Taiwan Obasang Political Equality Party Secretary-General Ho Yu-jung (何語蓉), and Green Party Taiwan Co-Convener Wang Yen-han (王彥涵). The conference strongly criticized the Executive Yuan and the Ministry of Transportation and Communications (交通部) for their handling of the case.

=== Civil society response ===
Chen Kai-ning (陳愷寧), chairperson of the Zero Pedestrian Deaths Alliance (行人零死亡推動聯盟), issued a public statement urging the government to treat the matter with urgency. He called for a swift investigation, systemic reforms, and a reevaluation of current driver's license testing standards.

=== Protests and public actions ===
Chen Kai-ning of the Zero Pedestrian Deaths Alliance announced plans to organize a public protest on May 25, calling for the public to gather outside the Ministry of Transportation and Communications to demand reforms to both the licensing and retraining systems for drivers.

The Pedestrian Rights Advocacy Group (還路於民行人路權促進會) announced a petition campaign to the Executive Yuan (行政院), scheduled for May 22 or 23, and a commemorative event at the accident site.

On May 21, it was confirmed that the Zero Pedestrian Deaths Alliance (行人零死亡推動聯盟) and the Next Generation Human-Centered Transportation Association (下一代人本交通促進會) would jointly organize a demonstration on May 24 titled "Protect the Next Generation: Traffic Engineering Reform and Mandatory Driver Retraining."

Additionally, the Pedestrian Rights Advocacy Group organized two events: a petition action at the Executive Yuan on May 22, titled "Sanxia Crash Petition: Protect Our Families Together," and a memorial event on May 24 titled "Moment of Silence for Traffic Victims – White Paper Crane Tribute."

== Impact ==
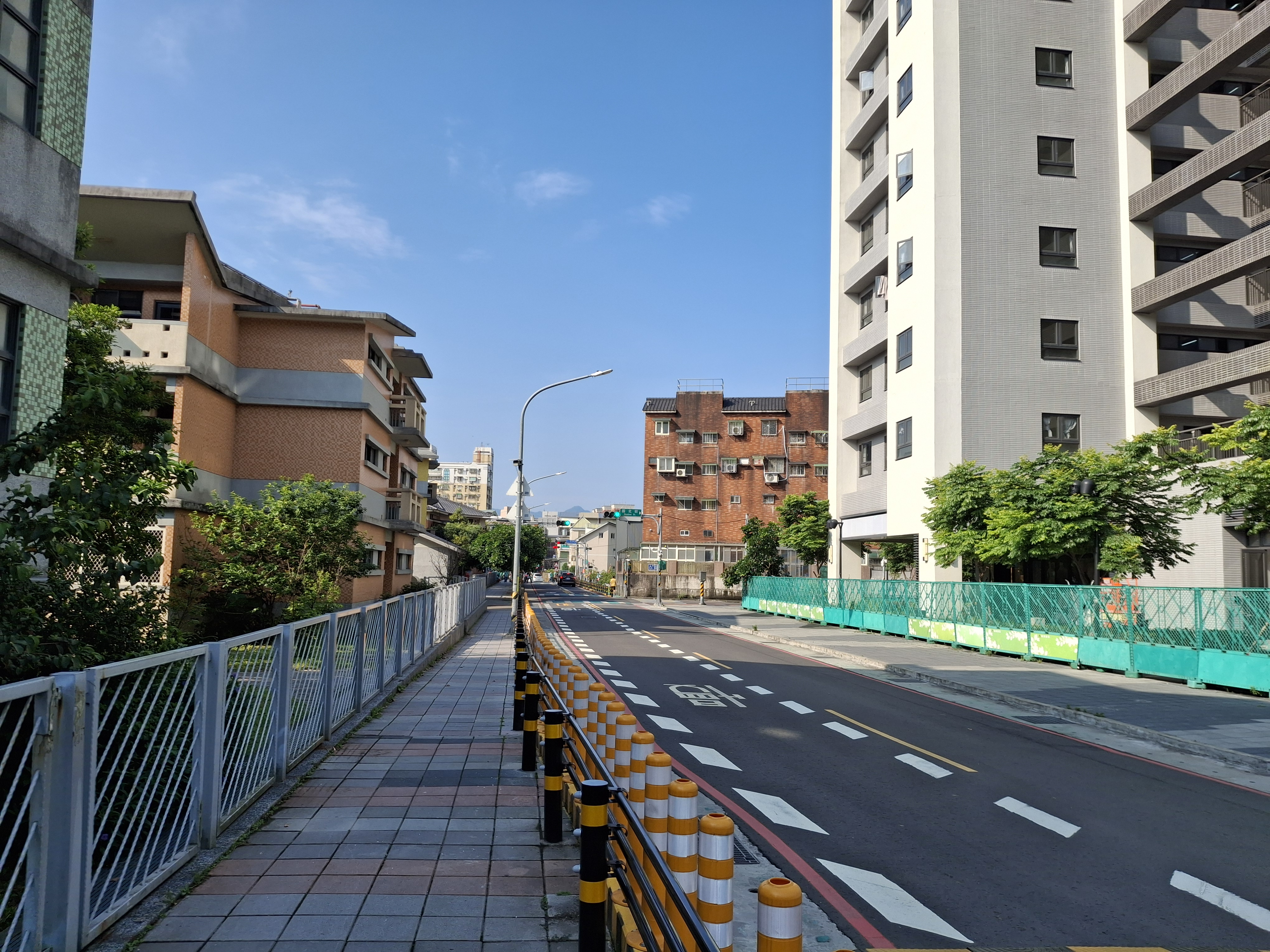
Road safety improvements on Guocheng Street, including visual chevron speed reduction markings and physical pedestrian guardrails, etc.

On May 20, the Ministry of Transportation and Communications held a press conference announcing plans to reform elderly driver management regulations. The reforms include: lowering the age threshold for license renewal, introducing additional testing requirements, and offering TPASS public transportation subsidies for drivers over the age of 70 who voluntarily surrender their licenses. These measures are expected to take effect in 2026. In addition, the ministry plans to increase the difficulty of the licensing exam. True-or-false questions will be removed and replaced entirely with multiple-choice questions of increased complexity. Regarding unlicensed driving, penalties will be strengthened. Repeat offenders may face unlimited fines, and the ministry is considering vehicle impoundment or license plate suspension as additional deterrents.

== Memorials and tributes ==
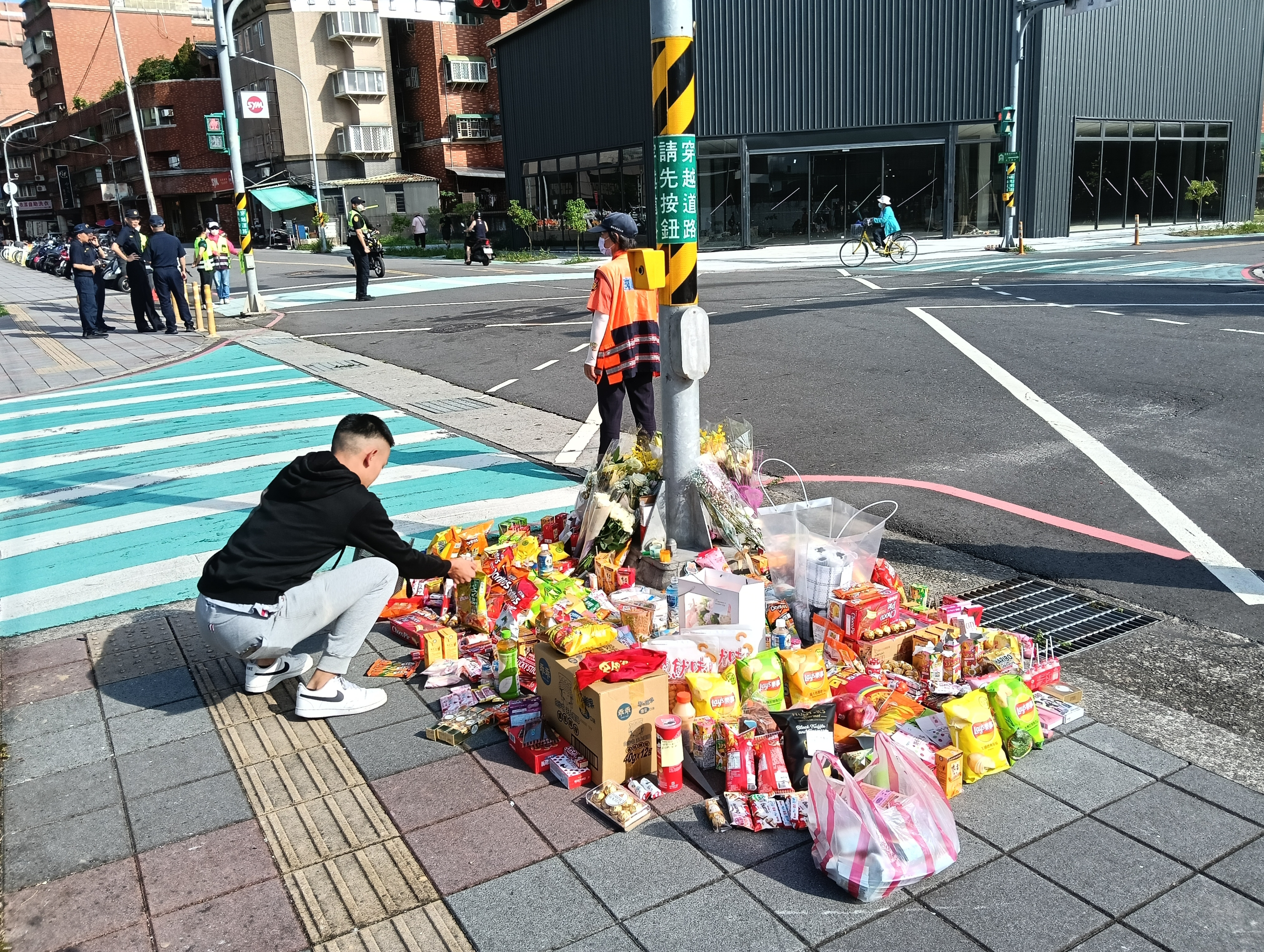
A public memorial formed spontaneously at the accident site on May 20.

The incident shocked Taiwanese society. In the days following the accident, large numbers of citizens visited the site to pay their respects. They left offerings such as snacks, flowers, stuffed animals, and new school uniforms to honor the memory of the victims and pray for peace. Locals have since referred to the incident as the "519 Incident (519事件)", marking the date as a moment of somber remembrance.
