= Lu Hsin-min =

Taiwanese politician (1940–2026)

- 呂新民

Member of the Legislative Yuan
- In office 1 February 1993 – 31 January 2005

Mayor of Bade
- In office 1 March 1986 (Note: Acting on behalf of Lee Shih-shui until 1 March 1990) – 1 March 1994
- Preceded by: Lee Shih-shui
- Succeeded by: Lee Chin-shui

Personal details
- Born: 30 November 1940 Hachikai, Tōen District, Shinchiku Prefecture, Taiwan, Japan
- Died: 10 January 2026 (aged 85)
- Party: Kuomintang; Non-Partisan Solidarity Union
- Education: National Taiwan Normal University
- Occupation: Schoolteacher

Lu Hsin-min (Chinese: 呂新民; 30 November 1940 – 10 January 2026) was a Taiwanese politician. A member of the Kuomintang and the Non-Partisan Solidarity Union, he served in the Legislative Yuan from 1993 to 2005.

Lu Hsin-min's father Lu Chang-you served as mayor of Bade Township. The younger Lu’s public service career also began in Bade, as the township office’s secretary, before he was also elected mayor.

He was then elected to the Legislative Yuan for four terms, from 1993 to 2005. In June 2002, Lu was one of four Kuomintang legislators suspected to have voted for Yao Chia-wen, a member of the Democratic Progressive Party, as President of the Examination Yuan. Having defied the party three times during the legislative session, he was promptly expelled from the Kuomintang. Lu joined a caucus of independent lawmakers later that year, and was considered for the position of deputy caucus convener. In January 2017, president Tsai Ing-wen appointed Lu as one of her national policy advisors.

Lu died on 10 January 2026, at the age of 85. He was married to Chen Ying-chao.
