= Weixinism =

Chinese salvationist religion

- 唯心聖教
- Scripture: Collection of scriptures from the Chinese religio-philosophical tradition; Apocalypse Scriptures and Weixin Canon by Grand Master Hun Yuan
- Founder: Grand Master Hun Yuan (1944–2026)
- Members: 300,000 core members, estimated 1 million more followers.
- Official website: http://cjs.tw/

Weixinism (Chinese: 唯心教; pinyin: Wéixīnjiào), institutionally also known by the extended title of Holy Church of the Heart-Only (Chinese: 唯心聖教; pinyin: Wéixīn Shèngjiào) is one of the Chinese salvationist religions founded in Taiwan in the late 20th century. It was founded in 1984 in Taichung by Grand Master Hun Yuan. Its global core membership is about 300,000, with a larger audience estimated by Taiwan's Ministry of Internal Affairs at 1,000,000. The church has quickly spread to mainland China since the early 2000s, where it functions as a platform for joint initiatives of mainland Chinese and Taiwanese governments for the renewal of Chinese culture. It has also developed as a worldwide religious movement, attracting followers not only from the Chinese diaspora, but also communities of other races, including East Asians and even Westerners.

Weixinism operates a synthesis and reproposition for the modern times of ancient Chinese religion and philosophy, primarily focused on the "orthodox lineages of Yijing and fengshui", and worship of the "Three Great Ancestors" (Huangdi, Yandi and Chiyou). It has been defined as a form of institutionalization of Chinese folk religion.

== Founding ==
Weixinism was founded in the 1980s, in a context where the end of martial law in Taiwan, with the consequent affirmation of freedom of religion, allowed several new religious movements to operate openly and eventually to gain legal recognition. At the same time, in the aftermath of the Cultural Revolution in the mainland, several local new religious movements presented themselves as the guardians of Chinese "orthodoxy" in religious beliefs, intended as the genuine religious and cultural tradition that had developed throughout centuries of Chinese history.

Among the most successful of such movements was Weixinism, which was founded as the result of the mystical experiences of Chang Yi-Jui, born in Zhongliao, Nantou, Taiwan, in 1944, and later known as Grand Master Hun Yuan. Before falling seriously ill in 1982, Chang, who operated a land survey company in Taiwan, was not particularly religious, although he had been interested for years in Yijing and fengshui. He attributed his recovery to a miraculous intervention and vowed to dedicate his remaining life to spirituality.

He claimed to have received messages both from the Jade Deity, one of the representations of the supreme God, and from Guiguzi, a name that indicates both a group of writings compiled between the late Warring States period and the end of the Han dynasty and their author, later deified in Chinese folk religion. Feeling he was now mystically united with Guiguzi, Chang opened a small worship hall in Taichung and started gathering followers. In 1984, he renamed the hall Shennong Temple and claimed to have received by divine revelation the name and title of Grand Master Hun Yuan. In 1987, he registered his movement as Weixinism, a name meaning "Heart(or Mind)-Only" teaching.

In 1989, the headquarters were moved to larger facilities in Nantou County, in a complex known as the Hsien Fo Temple. The movement's growth led to the establishment of some forty branch temples in Taiwan, and overseas branches in China, Japan, Vietnam, Australia, the United States, Canada, and Spain. A variety of temples, including a large headquarters complex known as the "City (or Temple) of the Eight Symbols" on Yumen Mountain in Henan, have been built in mainland China since 2001. Another headquarters complex has been built in 2008 in Nantou City, Taiwan.

Taiwanese scholar Liu Hsiu-Yi has argued that members join Weixinism because of four different motivations: problem-solving, learning doctrines, social networking, and personal religious experiences. Some believe the religion may help them solve practical problems in the fields of health and careers; others are interested in Weixinist theology; some join because they have relatives and friends in the movement; and some claim they had a deep spiritual experience when they first met Grand Master Hun Yuan.

== Education and society ==
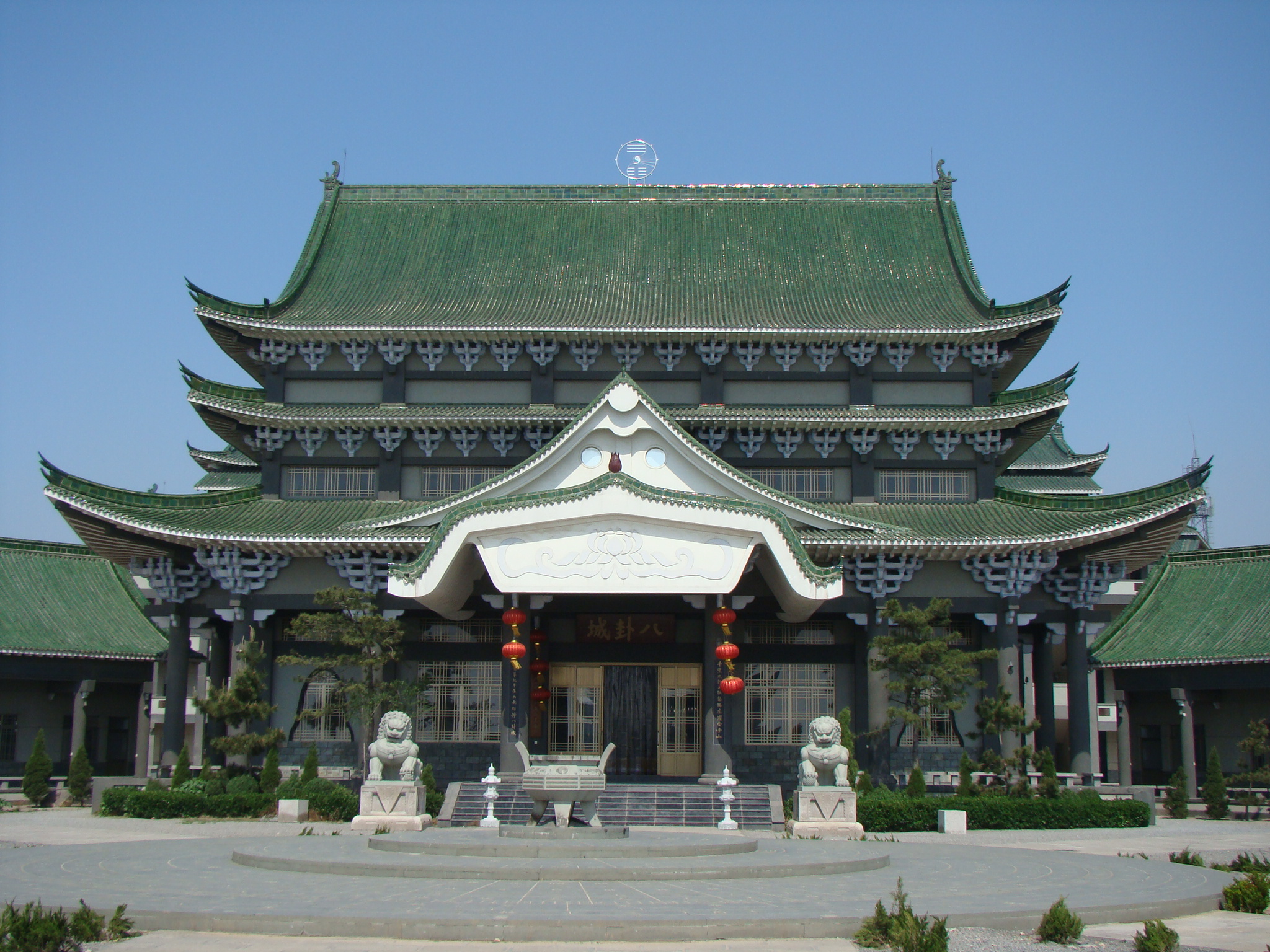
The City of the Eight Symbols in Qi, Hebi, is the headquarters of the Weixinist Church in Henan, mainland China.

Weixinism's success is largely due to it having emerged as a leading provider of courses on Yijing and fengshui, two systems that are immensely popular both in Taiwan and in China and among the international Chinese diaspora, and increasingly interest Westerners as well. Academic courses are offered through the Weixinist College, which has been accredited in 2013 by the Ministry of Education of Taiwan, while the I Ching University proposes "lifelong learning" seminars and coordinates courses offering Yijing teaching to children. Two million children have attended such courses between their launching in 1996 and 2016. Weixinism has also organized a number of academic conferences, featuring scholars from Taiwan, mainland China, Korea, and the West.

The church's educational effort also includes the publication of several books by Grand Master Hun Yuan and the daily television programs View All Perspectives of I Ching – Feng Shui (1998), Everybody Comes to Learn I Ching (1998), and Feng Shui of My Home (digital, 2004), as well as the group's own TV channel, Wei Xin TV. The Weixinist Church insists that Yijing should be taught not only as a philosophical system, but as a practical tool for divination, and that fengshui goes beyond the harmonious arrangement of buildings and furniture, and is in fact a complete system teaching how to live in harmony with nature.

Weixinism's notion of fengshui also motivated the movement to establish in 1999, in the aftermath of the devastating 1999 Chi-Chi earthquake, the I Ching and Feng Shui Interest Circle, which later evolved into the Feng Shui Interest Circle Service Team. The organization offers advice on how to build anti-seismic buildings according to the principles of fengshui, but also helps needy families in both Taiwan and mainland China. Other programs are aimed at improving the conditions in Taiwanese factories and other workplaces by applying the principles of fengshui there.

Weixinism worships Guiguzi who, according to the tradition, operated the first school of diplomacy in the world. One of the main activities of the movement is the promotion of initiatives for the spiritual reconciliation of Taiwan and mainland China, which is seen as a pre-condition for the solution of political problems. The Taiwan Weixin Association for World Peace has been established in 2009. Its goals go beyond local problems in Taiwan and include the promotion of world peace through the healing of grievances and resentments deriving from centuries of war and conflict.

== Doctrines ==
Weixinist theology is rooted in a mythical history of Chinese culture and civilization, largely derived from the tradition of Chinese folk religion. This history starts with the Kunlun. The Kunlun civilization is said to have flourished in remote times at the beginning of human history. Kunlun's wisdom was inherited by Fuxi, a king in the third millennium BCE and reputedly the originator of the Yijing, and transmitted by him through Jiutian Xuannü, the goddess of longevity incarnated on Earth, to the Three Ancestors of China: the Yandi ("Flame God"), the Huangdi ("Yellow God") and Chiyou.

The latter, Chiyou, is regarded in Chinese folk religion as an enemy against whom the Flame and Yellow Emperors had to fight. One of the peculiarities of Weixinism is its rehabilitation of Chiyou. He is regarded as the ancestor of China's ethnic minorities and the healing of the wounds left by the conflicts and wars that accompanied Chinese history requires, according to the movement, that Chiyou be worshiped as equal in dignity to the Yan and Yellow Emperors.

Guiguzi, according to Weixinist doctrines, was the legitimate heir of the Three Emperors. The awakened being Wang Chan Lao Chu incarnated in Guiguzi and is now mysteriously united with Grand Master Hun Yuan. The unbroken line connecting Kunlun to present-day Weixinism through the Three Ancestors and Guiguzi should guarantee that the movement embodies the most traditional Chinese "orthodoxy". The Three Ancestors are said to be at the origins also of the Japanese, Vietnamese, and Korean earliest royal families, thus incorporating a good part of the Far East within the same lineage.

The revelation of Guiguzi to Grand Master Hun Yuan and the latter's writings, also said to be inspired by Guiguzi, form a large corpus. It includes sixteen Apocalypse Scriptures and more than 18,000 volumes of speeches, writings, and comments of Grand Master Hun Yuan. Most of what he says is faithfully recorded by his followers and included in these collected works, known as the Weixin Canon.

== Rituals ==
Taiwanese scholars have interpreted Weixinism as an institutionalized form of traditional, non-institutional Chinese folk religion. Ritual, including chanting, is central in the movement. It includes daily ritual services at the headquarters and in the branch temples, as well as larger and more elaborate ceremonies. The movement believes that the systematic chanting of mantras by its members has averted or alleviated a number of world catastrophes.

Starting in 2004, the Weixinist Church has organized each year on January 1 in Taipei's Linkou Stadium the "Unified Ancestor Worship Ceremony for Chinese in the 21st Century", to bring peace to the souls of all ancestors, particularly those who perished in the many wars fought during Chinese history. These ceremonies draw crowds in excess of 30,000 each year. Presidents of the Republic of China, cabinet ministers, and other political leaders have also participated. Weixinism believes that ancestor worship ceremonies have a crucial role in promoting world peace and ushering in a future millennial era without conflicts that would last for 5,000 years.

== See also ==
- Chinese folk religion
- Chinese salvationist religions
