= Peace Memorial Day =

National holiday in Taiwan

- Also called: 228 Peace Day, February 28 Peace Memorial Day
- Observed by: Taiwan
- Type: National
- Observances: Taiwanese history, transitional justice, and progress
- Date: 28 February
- Frequency: Annual
- First time: 1995; 30 years ago
- Related to: February 28 incident

Peace Memorial Day (Chinese: 和平紀念日), also known as 228 Memorial Day (Chinese: 二二八紀念日), is a public holiday in Taiwan for honoring and mourning the victims and families of the February 28 incident in 1947. Proposals to establish Peace Memorial Day as a holiday began in the early 1990s. It was passed as a national memorial day in 1995 and as an official public holiday in 1997.

A couple years after the Kuomintang government took over the administration of Taiwan from Japan, rampant corruption and heightened inflation led to a general dissatisfaction with the new government. The February 28 incident in 1947 began the Chiang Kai-shek-led government's mass killing of civilians, which continued into a period of political persecution known as White Terror. The imposition of martial law became one of the longest in world history.

In February 1987, before martial law was lifted, the 228 Peace Day Association was formed by members of the Taiwan Association for Human Rights and various other human rights groups. On 28 February 1995, 48 years after the 1947 incident, President Lee Teng-hui made a public apology to families of victims and the whole country on behalf of the government. On 23 March 1995, the February 28 Incident Disposition and Compensation Act was passed in the Legislative Yuan, and Peace Memorial Day was officially recognized as an annual memorial day. In 1997, an amendment to the act, proposed by legislator Lin Kuang-hua, to elevate Peace Memorial Day to an official holiday was passed.

== See also ==
- 228 Hand-in-Hand rally
- Cheng Nan-jung
