= Deaths in March 2026 =

The following is a list of notable deaths in March 2026.

Entries for each day are listed alphabetically by surname. A typical entry lists information in the following sequence:

- Name, age, country of citizenship at birth, subsequent country of citizenship (if applicable), reason for notability, cause of death (if known), and reference.

== March 2026 ==
=== 1 ===
- Eugènia Balcells, 82, Spanish visual artist, cancer.
- Jeelani Bano, 89, Indian writer.
- Mark Bittner, 74, American writer, heart attack.
- Jacopo Camagni, 48, Italian illustrator and comics artist, complications from heart surgery.
- Vasile Constantin Mao, 88, Romanian rugby union coach and academic.
- John V. Cox, 95, American Marine Corps major general.
- Davíð Oddsson, 78, Icelandic politician, prime minister (1991–2004), minister for foreign affairs (2004–2005), and mayor of Reykjavík (1982–1991).
- Dagfinn Føllesdal, 93, Norwegian-born American academic and philosopher.
- Andrzej Gąsienica-Józkowy, 79–80, Polish mountain rescuer.
- Kermit Gosnell, 85, American serial killer.
- Suzanne Gunzburger, 86, American activist.
- Vyacheslav Klepikov, 76, Ukrainian nuclear physicist.
- Yuri Korolev, 91, Russian ice hockey player (Severstal Cherepovets) and administrator.
- Slavcho Krumov, 50, Bulgarian politician, MP (2023–2024).
- Margaret Aliyatul Maimunah, 47, Indonesian women's rights activist.
- Rino Marchesi, 88, Italian football player (Fiorentina, national team) and manager (Juventus).
- Christine Johnson McPhail, 80, American academic administrator, president of St. Augustine's University (2021–2023), cancer.
- Käthe Menzel-Jordan, 109, German architect.
- Arnaud Nguefack, 38, Cameroonian journalist.
- Clément Oubrerie, 59, French comics artist (Aya de Yopougon).
- Neville Peat, 78, New Zealand natural history writer and photographer.
- Josep Perarnau, 97, Spanish theologian.
- Bob Power, 74, American record producer and audio engineer.
- Patricia Schady, 47–48, British astrophysicist.
- Lubomír Šik, 98, Czech regional historian.
- Mike Smith, 59, Scottish cricketer (national team).
- Kenith Trodd, 90, British television producer (Pennies from Heaven).
- Jonathan Tyler, 85, British political activist and academic.
- Alexander Tzonis, 88, Greek-French architect.
- Georgi Velinov, 68, Bulgarian footballer (Cherno More, CSKA Sofia, national team).
- Gary Walker, 83, American musician (The Standells, The Walker Brothers), stroke.
- Wong Kiew-kit, 81, Malaysian martial artist.
- Yukkie B, 56, Dutch rapper, kidney cancer.
- Vadim Zelichenok, 70, Russian track and field coach.

=== 2 ===
- José Luis Álvarez, 65, Chilean footballer (Deportes La Serena, Colo-Colo, national team), complications from liver cancer.
- Natale Amodeo, 92, Italian politician, deputy (1979–1992).
- Jimmy Anderson, 93, American artist, musician and Christian preacher.
- Jahanara Arzu, 93, Bangladeshi poet.
- Kevin Ashcroft, 81, English rugby league player (Leigh, Warrington) and coach (Salford).
- Mahendra Bohra, 79, Indian film producer (Tejaa, Hume Tumse Pyaar Kitna).
- Jack Chambers, 87, Canadian linguist.
- Alice Chien Chang, 75, Taiwanese molecular biologist and neuroscientist.
- Sidney Dorsey, 86, American sheriff and convicted murderer.
- Umar Dzhabrailov, 67, Russian banker and politician, senator (2004–2009), suicide by gunshot.
- Len Garry, 84, English musician (The Quarrymen), pneumonia.
- Andrew Gunn, 58, Canadian film producer (Freaky Friday, Sky High, Cruella), complications from amyotrophic lateral sclerosis.
- Ivan Hall, 93, British architectural historian.
- Douglas Hambidge, 98, British-born Canadian Anglican clergyman, bishop of Caledonia (1969–1980) and New Westminster (1980–1993).
- Stephen Hibbert, 68, American actor (Pulp Fiction, True Jackson, VP) and television writer (Late Night with David Letterman), heart attack.
- Joe Hutchison, 88, American politician.
- Pat Hyland, 84, Australian jockey and horse trainer.
- Nikolay Kolyada, 68, Russian playwright, actor, and stage director, double pneumonia.
- Timothy D. Leonard, 86, American politician and jurist, member of the Oklahoma Senate (1979–1988), judge of the U.S. District Court for the Western District of Oklahoma (since 1992).
- Daniel Migliore, 90, American theologian.
- Yanar Mohammed, 66, Iraqi women's rights activist, shot.
- Hélène Mouchard-Zay, 85, French academic and writer.
- Ong Kok Hai, 80, Malaysian microbiologist.
- Kohei Otsuka, 66, Japanese politician, member of the House of Councillors (2001–2024), heart failure.
- Chase Pistone, 42, American racing driver.
- Pockets Warhol, 33, Canadian capuchin monkey artist.
- Billy Rafter, 96, American stock car driver.
- John Resman, 70, American politician, member of the Kansas House of Representatives (since 2017).
- Benedetto Santapaola, 87, Italian gangster.
- Try Sutrisno, 90, Indonesian military officer and politician, vice president (1993–1998), commander of the Armed Forces (1988–1993), and chief of staff (1986–1988).
- Kurt Strauss, 95, German-born British electrical engineer.
- Terry Tobacco, 90, Canadian Olympic runner (1956, 1960).
- Slava Tsukerman, 85, Russian film director, screenwriter and producer (Liquid Sky).
- Mike Vernon, 81, English record producer ("Albatross", "Hocus Pocus"), music executive and recording studio owner (Chipping Norton Recording Studios).
- Janardan Waghmare, 91, Indian educationist and politician, MP (2008–2014).
- Diamond Dave Whitaker, 88, American poet and activist.

=== 3 ===
- Alfredo Bengzon, 90, Filipino physician, secretary of health (1986–1992).
- Roy Book Binder, 82, American blues musician.
- Vijay Crishna, 81, Indian actor (Devdas, Chain Kulii Ki Main Kulii, Guzaarish).
- Patrick Dewolf, 75, French film director and screenwriter (Tandem).
- Sergey Duvakin, 97, Russian politician, chairman of the executive committee of the Jewish Autonomous Oblast (1971–1985).
- Ted Emery, 78–79, Australian television director (Countdown, Fast Forward, Kath & Kim), cancer.
- David Eugene Fellhauer, 86, American Roman Catholic prelate, bishop of Victoria in Texas (1990–2015).
- Tim Gerresheim, 87, German fencer, Olympic bronze medalist (1960).
- Alvin Greene, 48, American politician, pneumonia.
- Nancy Grewal, 45, Indian-born Canadian influencer and activist, stabbed.
- Gustav Gunsenheimer, 91, German composer and church music director.
- Robert Hinkle, 95, American stuntman (Bronco Buster) and actor (Hud, Gunsmoke), fall.
- Masako Ikeda, 87, Japanese voice actress (Galaxy Express 999, Aim for the Ace!, Kingdom Hearts Birth by Sleep).
- Patrice Jeener, 81, French artist and copper engraver.
- Unni-Lise Jonsmoen, 89, Norwegian illustrator and children's writer.
- Zsolt Kerestely, 91, Romanian composer and conductor.
- Muhammad al-Khuli, 88, Syrian military officer, chief of the air force intelligence directorate (1970–1987) and the air force (1994–1999).
- Carol Kitman, 96, American photographer.
- Bernard Launois, 95, French film director (Devil Story).
- Mujahid, 30, American Thoroughbred racehorse.
- Klaus Müller, 81, German Marxian economist and academic.
- Fernando Ónega, 78, Spanish journalist, speechwriter (Puedo prometer y prometo), and presidential communications director.
- Celeste Raspanti, 97, American playwright.
- Bob Rosenfarb, 74, American television producer and writer (Step by Step, Who's the Boss?, Head of the Class).
- Peter Schneider, 85, German writer (Berlin Now).
- Valentin Shcherbakov, 89, Russian politician, member of the Soviet of the Union (1979–1984).
- Danièle Sicot-Coulon, 90, French Olympic gymnast (1956, 1960).
- Yoshiharu Tsuge, 88, Japanese manga artist (Nejishiki), aspiration pneumonia.
- K. P. Unnikrishnan, 89, Indian politician, MP (1971–1996).
- Eugenio Viale, 86, Italian politician, deputy (2001–2006).
- Gabriele Vianello, 87, Italian basketball player (Olimpia Milano, Reyer Venezia, Varese).
- László Vincze, 74, Hungarian politician, MP (1998–2014). (death announced on this date)
- Andrew Watson, 64, British Anglican clergyman, bishop of Aston (2008–2014) and Guildford (since 2014), member of the House of Lords (since 2022), pancreatic cancer.
- Andrea Weiss, 60, American rabbi, cancer.
- Valentyna Yeshchenko, 79, Ukrainian politician, deputy (1990–1994).

=== 4 ===
- Catherine C. Blake, 75, American jurist, chief judge (2014–2017) and judge (since 1995) of the U.S. District Court for the District of Maryland.
- Clive Byers, 68, British bird watcher.
- John Cadman, 91, British Olympic field hockey player (1964) and cricketer (Suffolk).
- Janusz Cegliński, 76, Polish Olympic basketball player (1972).
- Dennis Cometti, 76, Australian sports commentator, football player and coach (West Perth).
- Lyle Conway, American actor, puppeteer and designer. (death announced on this date)
- Jacky Cupit, 88, American golfer.
- Vasilios Daniil, 87, Greek football manager (Panathinaikos, Olympiacos Volos, national team).
- Ahmed Ibrahim Darwish, 83, Egyptian writer and poet.
- Luis del Castillo Estrada, 90, Uruguayan Roman Catholic prelate, auxiliary bishop of Montevideo (1988–1999) and bishop of Melo (1999–2009).
- Rosario Di Vincenzo, 84, Italian footballer (Inter Milan, Genoa, U.C. Sampdoria).
- Anis Djaad, 51, Algerian film director and screenwriter (La Vie d'après).
- Michael Donovan, 72, Canadian voice actor (Adventures of Sonic the Hedgehog, X-Men: Evolution, The Elder Scrolls V: Skyrim).
- Hélène Dorlhac, 90, French doctor and politician.
- H. K. Dua, 88, Indian journalist (Hindustan Times, The Tribune), MP (2009–2015).
- Ronnie Eldridge, 95, American politician, member of the New York City Council (1989–2001).
- Lou Holtz, 89, American Hall of Fame college football coach (Notre Dame Fighting Irish, Arkansas Razorbacks, NC State Wolfpack) and sportscaster.
- Toshikazu Kawasaki, 70, Japanese paperfolder and origami theorist, injuries sustained in a house fire.
- Georg Koch, 54, German footballer (Fortuna Düsseldorf, MSV Duisburg, 1. FC Kaiserslautern), pancreatic cancer.
- Mosiuoa Lekota, 77, South African politician and anti-Apartheid activist, minister of defence (1999–2008) and premier of the Free State (1994–1996), cancer.
- Philip Low, 78, American chemist.
- Victoria MacKenzie-Childs, 77, American ceramic artist, co-founder of MacKenzie-Childs.
- Timothy A. McDonnell, 88, American Roman Catholic prelate, auxiliary bishop of New York (2001–2004) and bishop of Springfield of Massachusetts (2004–2014), cancer.
- Richard Menschel, 92, American investment banker (Goldman Sachs), brain cancer.
- Russell W. Meyer Jr., 93, American aviation executive, CEO of Grumman (1966–1974) and Cessna (1975–2000, 2002–2004).
- V. R. Muthu, 72, Indian sesame oil industry executive, chairman of Idhayam (since 1987).
- Ana Luisa Peluffo, 96, Mexican actress (Las señoritas Vivanco, The Phantom of the Operetta, Paper Flowers).
- Mouta Penda, Cameroonian comedian.
- Soli Philander, 65, South African actor (Devil's Peak), director and television presenter, cancer.
- Boris Podkorytov, 77, Kyrgyzstani football player (Alga Frunze, Lokomotiv Moscow) and manager (national team).
- Bernard Rands, 92, British-American composer.
- Ari Salin, 79, Finnish Olympic hurdler and sprinter (1972).
- Song Ping, 108, Chinese politician, head of the organization department (1987–1989), state councillor (1983–1988), and governor of Gansu (1977–1979).
- Sheik Mahaboob Subhani, 71, Indian nadaswaram player.
- William Thoresson, 93, Swedish gymnast, Olympic champion (1952).
- Joseph T. Threston, 90, American Navy systems engineer.
- Philip Trusttum, 85, New Zealand figurative expressionist artist.
- Ekaterina Vedunova, 45, Russian actress (Sklifosovsky), traffic collision.
- Chris Wheeler, 52, English chef.
- David Wilde, 75, English cricketer (Derbyshire).

=== 5 ===
- Reinaldo Aleluia, 53, Brazilian footballer (Bahia, Espérance, Ceará), cardiorespiratory arrest.
- Cecil L. Alexander, 90, American politician, member of the Arkansas House of Representatives (1963–1979).
- Alfredo Carnovali, 88, Argentine Olympic water polo player (1960).
- David Chivers, 81, British primate biologist.
- Bobby Cummines, 74, English gangster.
- Maurice J. Freedman, 86, American librarian, president of the American Library Association (2002–2003).
- Pedro Friedeberg, 90, Italian-born Mexican visual artist.
- Antoine Ghandour, 83, Lebanese writer.
- Keith Gillhouley, 91, English cricketer (Yorkshire, Nottinghamshire).
- Alexander Guts, 78, Russian mathematician.
- H. H. Hamid, 83, Indian Olympic footballer (1960).
- Bob Harlan, 89, American football executive (Green Bay Packers).
- Sir Tony Hoare, 92, British computer scientist (Quicksort, Quickselect, Hoare logic).
- Jerzy Józefiak, 88, Polish politician, MP (1989–1991).
- Uladzimir Karyzna, 87, Belarusian poet (national anthem).
- András Katona, 88, Hungarian water polo player, Olympic bronze medallist (1960).
- Yonehiko Kitagawa, 94, Japanese voice actor (Kinnikuman, Tiger Mask, Sally the Witch), pneumonia.
- Bernard Lafayette, 85, American civil rights activist, heart attack.
- Marguerite Lamour, 69, French politician, mayor of Ploudalmézeau (2001–2025) and deputy (2002–2012).
- Jane Lapotaire, 81, English actress (Piaf, Love Hurts, Rebecca), Tony Award winner (1981).
- Joan Leitzel, 89, American mathematician.
- António Lobo Antunes, 83, Portuguese novelist (The Land at the End of the World, Fado Alexandrino).
- Jacques Michel, 84, Canadian musician and songwriter.
- Edward R. Murphy, 88, American naval officer.
- Joaquín Palacín, 51, Spanish politician, member of the Cortes of Aragon (since 2011).
- Corey Parker, 60, American actor (Biloxi Blues, Friday the 13th: A New Beginning, Will & Grace), cancer.
- Eigra Lewis Roberts, 86, Welsh writer, playwright and poet.
- Mihail Secichin, 82, Moldovan pianist, director of Maria Bieșu National Opera and Ballet Theatre (1990–1992).
- Eli Shamir, 91, Israeli mathematician and computer scientist.
- Graham Sissons, 91, English footballer (Walsall, Birmingham City, Peterborough United).
- Jānis Streičs, 89, Latvian film director (A Limousine the Colour of Midsummer's Eve, Cilvēka bērns).
- Ron Twilegar, 86, American politician.
- Masaru Urata, 100, Japanese politician, member of the House of Councillors (1983–1989, 1992–1998).
- Sandy Wernick, 86, American film and television producer (ALF, Happy Gilmore, Def Comedy Jam).
- Albert Zuckerman, 94, American literary agent.

=== 6 ===
- Gerda Antti, 96, Swedish writer.
- Narayan Bareth, 68, Indian journalist and political analyst, cardiac arrest.
- Rolf Birkhölzer, 76, German football player (1. FC Köln, KSV Hessen Kassel) and manager (FSV Frankfurt).
- Katherine Dewar, 82, Canadian nurse and historian.
- Aleksandr Dulichenko, 84, Russian-Estonian Esperantist, linguist and Slavic microlanguages expert.
- Gyula Gobby Fehér, 82, Serbian writer.
- Francisco Fernández Carvajal, 88, Spanish Roman Catholic priest and writer.
- Pasquale Fiore, 72, Italian footballer (Napoli, Udinese).
- Franco Vito Gaiezza, 66, Italian musician and writer, heart attack.
- Thomas Gentille, 89, American jewelry designer.
- Giorgio Gosetti, 70, Italian film critic, journalist and essayist, founder of the Giornate degli Autori.
- Colleen Hanabusa, 74, American politician, member of the U.S. House of Representatives (2011–2015, 2016–2019), cancer.
- Nathan Healey, 76, New Zealand runner, brain injuries sustained in a cycling accident.
- André Kabile, 87, French footballer (Nîmes Olympique).
- Nikolay Kondakov, 76, Russian politician, MP (1994–1996).
- William C. Leary, 87, American politician, member of the Connecticut House of Representatives (1967–1973).
- Jan Lenferink, 80, Dutch radio and television presenter.
- Antonio Marsina, 80, Italian actor (Keoma, Vatican Conspiracy, Tornado: The Last Blood).
- Lolo Matalasi Moliga, 78, American Samoan politician, governor of American Samoa (2013–2021).
- Thaddeus Mosley, 99, American sculptor.
- Govind Parmar, 72, Indian politician, Gujarat MLA (1995–2003, since 2017).
- Patrick Pasculli, 78, American politician, mayor of Hoboken, New Jersey (1988–1993).
- Antonio Puddu, 81, Italian boxer.
- Alan Ridge, 91, Australian politician, Western Australia MLA (1968–1980).
- Jennifer Runyon, 65, American actress (Another World, Ghostbusters, Charles in Charge), cancer.
- Norma C. Russell, 88, American politician, member of the South Carolina Senate (1981–1983).
- Ingrid Schmithüsen, 66, German operatic soprano.
- Tsutomu Shibayama, 84, Japanese anime director (Doraemon), lung cancer.
- Tierney Thys, 59, American marine biologist and science educator.
- Christos Valavanidis, 81, Greek actor (The Wretches Are Still Singing, Loafing and Camouflage, Crying... Silicon Tears) and poet.
- Hans Wagner, 62, German-born Dutch politician, MP (2006).

=== 7 ===
- Vidi Aldiano, 35, Indonesian singer-songwriter, kidney cancer.
- Eduard Apalkov, 56, Russian footballer (Dynamo Stavropol, Belshina Bobruisk).
- Abolghasem Babaeian, Iranian government official, head of the Supreme Leader's military office and chief of staff of the Khatam al-Anbiya Central Headquarters, airstrike.
- Sadok Belaïd, 87, Tunisian jurist and academic.
- Marie-Christine Boutonnet, 77, French politician, MEP (2014–2019).
- David Brigati, 85, American singer (Joey Dee and the Starliters, The Rascals).
- Rostyslav Chapiuk, 88, Ukrainian politician, MP (1994–1998).
- Nick Ciancio, 79, Australian Olympic weightlifter (1972).
- Constantin Cojocariu, 60, Romanian rugby union player (Știința Baia Mare, national team).
- Jamie Dunn, 75, Australian puppeteer (Agro), voice actor and radio host.
- James Garbarino, 78, American academic and psychologist (Lost Boys: Why Our Sons Turn Violent and How We Can Save Them).
- Rose Marie Heck, 93, American politician, member of the New Jersey General Assembly (1991–2004).
- Susan Henry, 79, American academic.
- Eddie Illingworth, 87, Australian cricketer (Victoria).
- Samir Karabašić, 59, Bosnian Olympic canoeist (1996).
- Ed Learn, 90, Canadian football player (Montreal Alouettes, Toronto Argonauts).
- Lynell Marchese Zogbo, 78, American linguist.
- Country Joe McDonald, 84, American singer (Country Joe and the Fish) and songwriter ("I-Feel-Like-I'm-Fixin'-to-Die Rag"), complications from Parkinson's disease.
- Augie Meyers, 85, American musician (Sir Douglas Quintet, Texas Tornados).
- Troy Murray, 63, Canadian ice hockey player (Chicago Blackhawks, Winnipeg Jets, Colorado Avalanche) and broadcaster, Stanley Cup champion (1996), cancer.
- Cameron Ontko, 33, American football player (BC Lions), ruptured ulcer.
- Vicente Paniagua, 78, Spanish basketball player (Real Madrid, national team).
- Verdena Parker, 90, American last fluent speaker of the Hupa language.
- Ninel Petrova, 101, Russian ballet dancer.
- Judith Rapoport, 92, American psychiatrist.
- Matt Salter, 49, English rugby union (Bristol) and rugby league (London Broncos) player.
- Nuno Morais Sarmento, 65, Portuguese politician, minister of the presidency (2002–2005), MP (2005–2009).
- Paul Seed, 78, British television director (House of Cards, Auf Wiedersehen, Pet) and actor (Coronation Street), cancer.
- Mahendra Pal Singh, 85, Indian legal scholar.
- Sheldon Weinig, 98, American businessman, founder of Materials Research Corporation.

=== 8 ===
- Syed Muhammad Naquib al-Attas, 94, Malaysian philosopher.
- B. Wongar, 94, Serbian writer and photographer (Totem and Ore).
- Hans-Georg Backhaus, 96, German Marxist economist and philosopher.
- Maricla Boggio, 88, Italian writer.
- Philip Bourne, 72, Australian bioinformatician and writer, mesothelioma.
- Antonio Camps, 87, Spanish football player (Espanyol, Catalonia national team) and manager (Sants).
- Lutfiya al-Dulaimi, 87, Iraqi writer.
- Zeph Ellis, 37, British rapper.
- Curzia Ferrari, 96, Italian writer.
- Matt Gallagher, 52, English rugby union player (Coventry R.F.C.), complications from motor neurone disease.
- Micky Hammon, 68, American politician.
- Mohamed Hansal, 78, Algerian football referee.
- David Keene, 80, American political consultant, chair of the American Conservative Union (1984–2011) and president of the National Rifle Association of America (2011–2013), pancreatic cancer.
- Walid Khalidi, 100, Palestinian historian.
- Sir Anthony Leggett, 87, British-American theoretical physicist, Nobel Prize laureate (2003).
- Arturo López, 90, Bolivian footballer (Chaco Petrolero, national team).
- Slavoljub Marjanović, 71, Serbian chess Grandmaster.
- Fahad Al-Mejmed, 33, Kuwaiti footballer (Al Qadsia SC, Al-Salmiya SC, national team).
- Mantana Morakul, 102, Thai singer and actress.
- William Norvel, 90, American Catholic priest.
- R. Parthasarathy, 91, Indian poet and translator.
- David Rokni, 94, Israeli colonel.
- Sam Scarber, 76, American actor (The Karate Kid, Over the Top) and football player (San Diego Chargers).
- Ray Schoenke, 84, American football player (Dallas Cowboys, Washington Redskins), cancer.
- Jerzy Szymanek, 88, Polish politician, MP (1972–1985).
- Abdullah Tari, 86, Indian Islamic scholar and political activist.

=== 9 ===
- Umberto Allemandi, 88, Italian publisher.
- Richard Bozulich, 90, American Go player.
- Alexander Butterfield, 99, American Air Force officer and presidential assistant (Richard Nixon), administrator of the FAA (1973–1975), key figure in the Watergate scandal.
- Amy Carr, 34, English footballer (Reading, Northern Illinois Huskies, IL Sandviken), brain tumour.
- Tamal Roy Chowdhury, 80, Indian actor (Challenge, Chander Pahar, Bindaas), cardiac arrest.
- Patricia Clarke, 99, Australian writer, historian and journalist.
- Alistair Cochran, 89, Scottish-born American immunologist and pathologist.
- Merrill Cook, 79, American politician, member of the U.S. House of Representatives (1997–2001).
- Mario D'Acquisto, 95, Italian politician.
- Tommy DeCarlo, 60, American singer (Boston), brain cancer.
- Oleksandr Dovhach, 52, Ukrainian military pilot, Hero of Ukraine (2025).
- Pierre el-Rahi, 50, Lebanese Maronite priest, airstrike.
- Blake Emmons, 81, Canadian country singer and television host (Funny Farm, Chain Reaction).
- Engin Fırat, 55, Turkish football manager (Saipa, Moldova national team, Kenya national team), heart attack.
- Gerard Gaynor, 104, American electrical engineer.
- Wylie Gibbs, 103, Australian politician, MP (1963–1969).
- Martin Gugino, 81, American peace activist (Buffalo police shoving incident).
- César Gutiérrez Peña, 69, Peruvian mechanical engineer.
- Heorhij Halenčanka, 89, Belarusian historian.
- Klaus Kribben, 88, German politician, member of the Landtag of Schleswig-Holstein (1975–1996).
- Alisa Kurdian, 82, Armenian cinematographer.
- Allan Legere, 78, Canadian serial killer.
- Rauno Lehtiö, 84, Finnish Olympic ice hockey player (1964).
- Jacqueline Lemay, 88, Canadian singer.
- Yukie Maeda, 52, Japanese voice actress (Love Hina, Shin Koihime Musō, Transformers: Armada).
- Ernie Mills, 91, American decoy maker.
- Mauricio Nanni, 46, Uruguayan footballer (Montevideo Wanderers, national team), cancer.
- Sergei Nekrasov, 53, Russian footballer (Dynamo Moscow, Khimki, national team).
- Festus Onigbinde, 88, Nigerian football manager (national team).
- K. N. Panikkar, 89, Indian historian.
- Leoš Šimánek, 79, Czech-German-Canadian traveler and writer.
- Phil Summerill, 78, English footballer (Birmingham City, Millwall, Huddersfield Town).
- Wang Jinshan, 81, Chinese politician, party secretary (2007–2010) and governor of Anhui (2003–2007).
- Willie Anthony Waters, 74, American opera conductor and artistic director (Connecticut Opera).

=== 10 ===
- Mohiuddin Ahmed, 75, Bangladeshi politician, MP (1986–1988), pneumonia.
- Anna Asheshov, 84, British Olympic alpine skier (1964).
- José Antônio Bacchim, 67, Brazilian teacher and politician.
- Allen Bell, 92, American Olympic cyclist (1956, 1960).
- Derek Bellotti, 79, English footballer (Southend United, Gillingham, Swansea City).
- Gérard Besnard, 80, French racing cyclist.
- IJf Blokker, 95, Dutch actor (De Fred Haché Show, Zeg 'ns Aaa, Van Oekel's Discohoek), musician and presenter.
- Rebecca Chance, 59, British novelist and journalist.
- Betty Christian, 83, Pitcairn Islands politician.
- Abdulwahab Darawshe, 82, Israeli politician, MK (1984–1999).
- Alfredo Bryce Echenique, 87, Peruvian writer (A World for Julius, Huerto cerrado).
- Pascal Edoh Agbove, 55, Togolese businessman and civil servant.
- Biren Sing Engti, 81, Indian politician, MP (2004–2019).
- Luc Giard, 69, Canadian cartoonist and artist.
- Susan Haack, 80, British philosopher.
- Michael Hague, 77, American illustrator (The Hobbit, Alice's Adventures in Wonderland).
- Zdeněk Hummel, 79, Czech basketball player (USK Praha, Slovan Orbis Praha BK, Czechoslovakia national team) and coach.
- Alojz Ihan, 64, Slovenian immunologist and poet.
- Valeriu Irimescu, 85, Romanian rugby union player (Paris Université Club, Sporting Club d'Angoulême, national team).
- Lloyd Jones, 74, Welsh novelist.
- Kim Yong-chae, 93, South Korean politician, mayor of the Nowon District (1996–1998).
- Orhan Kaynak, 56, Turkish football player (Beşiktaş, Trabzonspor, national team) and manager, heart attack.
- László Kiss, 75, Hungarian judge, justice of the constitutional court (1998–2016).
- Hermann Kulke, 87, German Indologist.
- Lee Sang-hee, 80, South Korean general and politician, minister of national defense (2008–2009).
- Moon Yong-joo, 93, South Korean politician, MP (1981–1985).
- Giorgos Panousopoulos, 84, Greek film director (Mania, Love Me Not?, Testosterone), cinematographer and screenwriter.
- Raúl del Pozo, 89, Spanish journalist.
- Viktor Shreyder, 74, Russian politician, MP (2011–2021).
- Matt Snell, 84, American football player (New York Jets).
- Thakkali Srinivasan, 72, Indian film director (Jenma Natchathram, Witness, Aduthathu) and musician.
- Melvin Steinberg, 92, American politician, lieutenant governor of Maryland (1987–1995) and member of the Maryland Senate (1967–1987).
- Fumiko Takeshita, 69, Japanese novelist.
- Luc Van der Kelen, 77, Belgian journalist.
- Zalek, 30, Colombian reggaeton singer, traffic collision.

=== 11 ===
- Jean-François Boclé, 54, French artist.
- Jim Cadile, 85, American football player (Chicago Bears).
- Ron Delany, 91, Irish middle-distance runner, Olympic champion (1956).
- Valentin Gneushev, 74, Russian circus director (Cirque du Soleil, Moscow State Circus) and choreographer.
- Jan Holmlund, 68, Swedish Olympic ski jumper (1980).
- Michel Hulin, 90, French philosopher.
- Jeong Chi-geun, 94, South Korean politician, minister of justice (1982).
- Niaz Ahmed Jhakkar, 71, Pakistani politician, MNA (2002–2007, 2018–2023).
- Gladys Kokorwe, 78, Botswanan politician, speaker of the National Assembly (2014–2019).
- Lewis Lehrman, 87, American banker and politician, complications from Parkinson's disease.
- Nev MacEwan, 91, New Zealand rugby union player (Wellington, national team).
- Luciano Magnalbò, 82, Italian politician, senator (1996–2006).
- Jesús Malavé, 60, Venezuelan sprinter.
- Marcelino Miyares Sotolongo, 88, Cuban-American politician and marketing executive.
- Salih Muslim, 75, Syrian Kurdish politician, kidney failure.
- Catherine Nolan, 67, American politician, member of the New York State Assembly (1985–2022), cancer.
- Judy Pace, 83, American actress (Peyton Place, The Young Lawyers, Brian's Song).
- Wendy Playfair, 99, Australian actress (Prisoner).
- Kiril Pop Hristov, 58, Macedonian actor (Bal-Can-Can), heart attack.
- Kavuri Samba Siva Rao, 82, Indian politician, MP (1984–2014) and minister of textiles (2013–2014).
- Jesse Roth, 91, American endocrinologist.
- Serena's Song, 33, American Thoroughbred racehorse.
- Henryk Stroniarz, 89, Polish football player (Cracovia, national team) and manager (Stal Mielec).
- Patrick Trémège, 71, French politician, deputy (1995–1997).
- Natalya Vetoshnikova, 104, Russian tennis player.
- Gary Wagner, 85, American baseball player (Philadelphia Phillies, Boston Red Sox).
- Marina Yusoff, 84, Malaysian politician, lawyer and businesswoman.

=== 12 ===
- Daniel Amey, 84, American application engineer.
- Ernie Anastos, 82, American news anchor (WABC) and talk show host, pneumonia.
- Tony Balsamo, 89, American baseball player (Chicago Cubs).
- Hussein Bazzi, 38, Lebanese academic (Lebanese University), airstrike.
- Enrica Bonaccorti, 76, Italian television presenter (Non è la Rai) and actress (Your Vice Is a Locked Room and Only I Have the Key, The Sensual Man), pancreatic cancer.
- Tom Brown, 89, American Hall of Fame football player (BC Lions).
- Asim Bukhari, 76, Pakistani actor (Badmash Gujjar).
- John F. Burns, 81, British journalist (The New York Times), pneumonia.
- Bruno Contrada, 94, Italian police and intelligence officer.
- Francine Descarries, 84, Canadian sociologist and academic.
- Brian Doherty, 57, American journalist (The Washington Post, The Wall Street Journal) and author (Radicals for Capitalism), fall.
- Al Festa, 68, Italian film director, composer and screenwriter.
- Jorie Lueloff Friedman, 85, American news anchor (WMAQ).
- Rennie Fritchie, Baroness Fritchie, 83, British life peer, member of the House of Lords (2005–2024).
- Anastasios Gonis, 99, Greek politician, MP (1993–1996).
- Harimurali, 27, Indian actor (Rasikan, Amar Akbar Anthony, Annan Thampi), suicide.
- Petro Hasiuk, 75, Ukrainian politician, MP (2006–2012).
- Guillaume Houphouët-Boigny, 88, Ivorian banker.
- Keith Ingham, 88, English jazz pianist.
- Kevin Kiely, 64, Irish politician, mayor of Limerick (2009–2010), complications from Parkinson's disease.
- Valeri Kirss, 80, Estonian media personality and lawyer.
- Patrick Lemasle, 73, French politician, deputy (1997–2017).
- Donald Liao, 96, Hong Kong civil servant and architect, secretary for housing (1980–1985) and district administration (1985–1989).
- Antón Louro, 73, Spanish politician, member of the Parliament of Galicia (1997–2004), deputy (2004–2009).
- Bernt Mæland, 67, Norwegian footballer (Bryne, Viking).
- Margareta Magnusson, 91, Swedish artist and essayist, advocate of Swedish death cleaning.
- Trevor McMahon, 96, New Zealand cricketer (Wellington, national team).
- Boubacar Ould Messaoud, 80, Mauritanian human rights activist.
- John H. Morrison, 92, American lawyer.
- Dame Jenni Murray, 75, English journalist and broadcaster (Woman's Hour).
- Kendall Myers, 88, American convicted spy, cancer.
- Jacques Revel, 83, French historian.
- David Sage, 85, American actor (The Birdcage, Campus Cops, Highway to Heaven).
- Fahd bin Mahmoud al Said, 85, Omani politician, deputy prime minister (since 1979).
- Peeter Simm, 73, Estonian film director (Georg, On the Water).
- Andrei Socaci, 59, Romanian weightlifter, Olympic silver medallist (1984).
- Robert Trivers, 83, American evolutionary biologist.
- Joachim Wanke, 84, German Roman Catholic prelate, auxiliary bishop (1980–1994) and bishop (1994–2012) of Erfurt.
- Elsa Wolliaston, 80, Jamaican-born French dancer and choreographer, cancer.

=== 13 ===
- John Alford, 54, British actor (Grange Hill, London's Burning), singer and convicted sex offender.
- Nick Baker, 88, American politician, member of the Kentucky Senate (1970–1978).
- Jacques Basler, 84, Swiss sculptor.
- Giovanni Bolzoni, 88, Italian footballer (Sampdoria, Genoa, Napoli).
- Billy Campbell, 81, Northern Irish footballer (Dundee, Motherwell, national team).
- Phil Campbell, 64, Welsh guitarist (Motörhead, Persian Risk, Phil Campbell and the Bastard Sons), complications from surgery.
- H. J. Dora, 83, Indian police officer.
- Paul R. Ehrlich, 93, American biologist, environmentalist, and author (The Population Bomb), cancer.
- Envoi Allen, 12, French Thoroughbred racehorse, heart attack.
- David Evans, 85, British applied mathematician.
- Richard Evans, 91, American brigadier general.
- Rosina Fernhoff, 94, American actress (A Novel Romance, Studio One, Spring Street).
- Ralf Friberg, 89, Finnish journalist (Hufvudstadsbladet), politician, and MP (1970–1979).
- Ann Gluckman, 98, New Zealand educator.
- Shujaat Hashmi, 75, Pakistani actor (Waris, Khaak Aur Khoon, Wadda Khan), heart attack.
- William Alvin Howard, 99, Canadian-born American mathematician.
- Sultan Ali Keshtmand, 90, Afghan politician, chairman of the Council of Ministers (1981–1988, 1989–1990).
- Marian Kielec, 84, Polish footballer (Pogoń Szczecin, national team).
- Madhu Malhotra, 72, Indian actress (Vishwanath, Satte Pe Satta, Qayamat).
- Billy McCullough, 90, Northern Irish footballer (Arsenal, Millwall, national team).
- İlber Ortaylı, 78, Turkish historian.
- John M. Perkins, 95, American Christian preacher, civil rights activist, and author.
- Hjálmar H. Ragnarsson, 73, Icelandic composer.
- Enric Reyna, 85, Spanish football executive, acting president of FC Barcelona (2003).
- Zsigmond Ritoók, 96, Hungarian classical philologist.
- Ron Roberts, 83, English footballer (Wrexham, Tranmere Rovers, Stafford Rangers), cancer.
- Shyyell Diamond Sanchez-McCray, 42, American drag performer and activist, shot.
- Fatma Sarhan, 97, Egyptian singer.
- John A. Shaud, 92, American Air Force general, chief of staff of the Supreme Headquarters Allied Powers Europe (1988–1991), complications from a stroke.
- Doug Shively, 88, American football coach (New Orleans Saints, Atlanta Falcons, Houston Oilers).
- Eili Sild, 83, Estonian actress (Devil with a False Passport).
- Gordon Wallace, 82, Scottish football player (Dundee, Montrose) and manager (Raith Rovers).
- Roger S. Wieck, 74, American art historian (Morgan Library and Museum), cancer.
- Wolfredo Wildpret de la Torre, 92, Spanish botanist.
- Phil Wise, 76, American football player (New York Jets, Minnesota Vikings).
- Siti Norma Yaakob, 85, Malaysian jurist, chief judge of Malaya (2004–2006).

=== 14 ===
- Lyudmila Arinina, 99, Russian actress (A Teacher of Singing, Waiting for Love, Guest from the Future).
- Volodymyr Babayev, 74, Ukrainian scholar and politician, governor of Kharkiv Oblast (2010).
- Jochen Bachfeld, 73, German boxer, Olympic champion (1976).
- Roy R. Barrera Sr., 99, American politician and activist, secretary of state of Texas (1968–1969).
- József Benke, 88, Hungarian historian.
- Jens Blauert, 87, German scientist (psychoacoustics).
- Lamberto Cardia, 91, Italian politician, secretary of the council of ministers (1995–1996).
- Amelia Casadei, 96, Italian politician, deputy (1976–1979), member of the Regional Council of Veneto (1985–1990).
- Brian Clarke, 87, British author, journalist and angler, chest infection.
- Lovorka Čoralić, 58, Croatian historian.
- Gemma Cuervo, 91, Spanish actress (Vente a Alemania, Pepe, Two Men and Two Women Amongst Them, Aquí no hay quien viva).
- Francine Demichel, 87, French academic and jurist.
- Jack Dennis, 94, American computer scientist.
- Noureddine Djoudi, 92, Algerian diplomat.
- Paulo Fernando, 58, Brazilian politician, four-time deputy.
- Nikolay Garo, 88, Russian production manager, producer and actor.
- Paul Geremia, 81, American blues musician.
- Jürgen Habermas, 96, German philosopher and sociologist (The Theory of Communicative Action, The Structural Transformation of the Public Sphere, Knowledge and Human Interests).
- Willy Hillen, 82, Dutch Olympic sport shooter (1972, 1976).
- Odd Holten, 85, Norwegian politician, MP (1989–2005).
- Serge Mathieu, 90, French politician, deputy (1973–1976), senator (1977–2004).
- Sergio Merusi, 83, Italian politician and economist, mayor of Novara (1993–1997).
- Shigeaki Mori, 88, Japanese historian and atomic bomb survivor.
- Henry Nwosu, 62, Nigerian football player (New Nigeria Bank, national team) and manager (Gateway United).
- Barbara Hatch Rosenberg, 97, American molecular biologist.
- Christopher A. Sims, 83, American economist, Nobel laureate (2011), fall.
- Steve Thel, 71, American academic and lawyer.
- Birte Weiss, 84, Danish politician, minister of the interior (1993–1997).
- Hugh Winsor, 87, Canadian journalist (The Globe and Mail), stroke.
- Andrew B. Wittkower, 91, British-born Canadian-American physicist.
- Phil Woolas, 66, British politician, MP (1997–2010), brain cancer.
- Jordan Wright, 33, British reality television personality (The Only Way Is Essex, Ex on the Beach).
- Beauty Zibula, 65, South African politician, MP (2019–2024).

=== 15 ===
- Andy Alaszewski, 76, British academic.
- Napoleón Becerra, 61, Peruvian trade unionist and politician, presidential candidate (2026), traffic collision.
- Abdulrahman Al-Bishi, 43, Saudi Arabian footballer (Al-Nassr, national team), complications from amyotrophic lateral sclerosis.
- Matt Clark, 89, American actor (In the Heat of the Night, The Outlaw Josey Wales, The Jeff Foxworthy Show), complications from spinal surgery.
- Ken Cole, 82, Australian Olympic basketball player (1964) and coach.
- Alessandro Cortese de Bosis, 99, Italian academic, diplomat and writer.
- Len Deighton, 97, British spy novelist and illustrator (The IPCRESS File, An Expensive Place to Die, XPD).
- Bill Dempsey, 83, Australian footballer (West Perth).
- William C. Dietz, 80, American science fiction writer (Halo: The Flood).
- Valter Farina, 72, Italian professional poker player.
- Raymond Finney, 84, American politician, member of the Tennessee Senate (2004–2008).
- Jim Fleeting, 70, Scottish football player (Ayr United, Clyde) and manager (Kilmarnock).
- Paul Guest, 87, Australian Olympic rower (1960, 1964, 1968).
- James M. Houston, 103, British-born Canadian theologian.
- Patricia Jacobs, 91, Scottish geneticist, major contributor to research of Jacobs syndrome, stroke.
- Sam Kieth, 63, American comic book artist and writer (The Maxx, Zero Girl), complications from Lewy Body dementia.
- Attila Lőte, 91, Hungarian actor (Sunshine).
- Irmeli Mäkelä, 83, Finnish pop singer.
- Egidio Marzona, 81, Italian art collector.
- Lee Morrison, 94, Canadian politician, MP (1993–2000).
- Cinzia Oscar, 63, German-Italian singer and stage actress.
- Richard Randriamandrato, 67, Malagasy diplomat, minister of economy (2019–2021) and foreign affairs (2021).
- Jamal Rayyan, 72, Palestinian news anchor (Al Jazeera).
- Ibrar Hussain Rizvi, Pakistani footballer (Wohaib, Pakistan Police, national team).
- Bruno Salomone, 55, French actor (Fais pas ci, fais pas ça, Madeleine Collins, Tamara).
- Andriy Serdyuk, 87, Ukrainian medical scientist, minister of healthcare (1996–1999).
- Shoshana Strook, 34, Israeli activist.
- Samih Tabila, 75, Palestinian politician, minister of transport and communications (2015–2019), mayor of Nablus (2015–2017, 2019–2021).
- Wakashimazu Mutsuo, 69, Japanese sumo wrestler, pneumonia.
- Mariusz Wideryński, 74–75, Polish photographer.
- Eugeniusz Wyzner, 94, Polish politician.

=== 16 ===
- Marcelo Araujo, 78, Argentine sports journalist and commentator (Fútbol de Primera).
- Navnindra Behl, 76, Indian actress (Ishqbaaaz, Hotel Salvation, Khufiya) and director.
- Paul Black, 95, British educational researcher.
- Joan Blackman, 87, American actress (Blue Hawaii, Kid Galahad, Peyton Place).
- Jamie Blanks, 54, Australian film director (Urban Legend, Valentine) and composer (Storm Warning).
- Yves Chevallard, 79, French mathematician.
- Buddy Childers, 87, American politician, member of the Georgia House of Representatives (1974–2004).
- Jack Crabtree, 90, American football player (Philadelphia Eagles, Denver Broncos).
- Jean Delas, 86, French publisher.
- Gene Derfler, 101, American politician, member of the Oregon House of Representatives (1988–1994), president (2001–2003) and member (1994–2003) of the Oregon Senate.
- John Galas, 53, American soccer coach (Lane United, Tucsom), synovial sarcoma.
- Elza Goeva, 97, Bulgarian painter.
- Andrey Golikov, 80, Russian actor.
- Sally Grace, 74, English actress (Mr. Bean: The Animated Series, Coronation Street, Ghost Story), cancer.
- James N. Hardin Jr., 87, American Germanist.
- E. Grady Jolly, 88, American jurist, judge of the U.S. Court of Appeals for the Fifth Circuit (since 1982).
- Dolores Keane, 72, Irish folk singer (De Dannan).
- Friederun Köhnen, 83, German television chef and food industry executive.
- Bettina Köster, 66, German singer, musician and composer.
- Thomas S. Langner, 102, American sociologist.
- Sergey Maksimenko, 71, Belarusian physicist.
- Ernő Mészáros, 90, Hungarian air chemist and meteorologist.
- Bjørn Nilsen, 91, Norwegian poet, journalist and television producer, chair of the Norwegian Authors' Union (1975–1977).
- Alfred J. Noll, 66, Austrian politician, member of the National Council (2017–2019).
- Juan Ochagavía Larraín, 97, Chilean academic and Jesuit theologian.
- Eric Overmyer, 74, American television writer and producer (Bosch, Law & Order, The Wire).
- Wayne Perkins, 74, American guitarist, stroke.
- Ove Pihl, 87, Swedish painter and art director.
- Monroe Price, 87, American academic.
- Orion Samuelson, 91, American agriculture broadcaster (WGN).
- Kiki Shepard, 74, American television host (Showtime at the Apollo), heart attack.
- Csaba Siklós, 84, Hungarian politician, MP (1990–1994). (death announced on this date)
- Vladimír Stránský, 78, Czech ice hockey player (HC Vítkovice, HC Zlín).
- Daniel Aweyue Syme, Ghanaian politician.
- Marek Trombski, 88, Polish politician and scientist.
- Bob Tullius, 95, American racing driver (IMSA).
- Elisabeth Waldo, 107, American violinist and composer.
- Yuk L. Yung, 79, Chinese-born American planetary scientist.

=== 17 ===
- Doug Camilli, 89, American baseball player (Los Angeles Dodgers, Washington Senators).
- Alicia Caro, 95, Colombian-Mexican actress (Dos pesos dejada, Daughter of Deceit, Chucho the Mended).
- Lorena Clare Facio, 82, Costa Rican equestrian, first lady (1998–2002), pancreatic cancer.
- John Coley, 91, New Zealand painter.
- Aníbal Cristobo, 54, Argentine poet.
- Jakub Derech-Krzycki, 56, Polish politician, MP (2001–2005).
- László Gallé, 83, Hungarian biologist.
- G. M. Fazlul Haque, 83, Bangladeshi politician, MP (1996–2006).
- Tony Gould, 87, British journalist (New Society, New Statesman). (death announced on this date)
- Ilia II of Georgia, 93, Georgian Orthodox hiearch, Catholicos-Patriarch of All Georgia (since 1977), gastrointestinal bleeding.
- Nicholas Haysom, 73, South African diplomat, special representative of the Secretary-General (since 2021) and head of the UN Mission in South Sudan (since 2016).
- Rainelle Krause, 37, American soprano.
- Aleksandra Kurczab-Pomianowska, 85, Polish actress and translator.
- Ali Larijani, 67, Iranian politician, twice secretary of the Supreme National Security Council, speaker of the Parliament (2008–2020), and minister of culture (1992–1994), airstrike.
- Albert Lowagie, 96, Belgian Olympic sprinter (1952).
- Dan Lynch, 96, American politician.
- Sir Anthony Mason, 100, Australian jurist, chief justice (1987–1995), judge of the Supreme Court of New South Wales (1969–1972) and the High Court (1972–1987).
- Mark McLane, 56, Canadian politician, Prince Edward Island MLA (since 2021).
- Carl Poelker, 82, American athletics coach.
- Slava Racheva, 87, Bulgarian actress and puppeteer.
- Zlatko Šimenc, 87, Croatian water polo player, Olympic silver medallist (1964).
- Gholamreza Soleimani, 61–62, Iranian military officer, commander of the Basij (since 2019), airstrike.
- Larry Stahl, 84, American baseball player (Kansas City Athletics, New York Mets, San Diego Padres).
- Shams Sumon, 59, Bangladeshi actor (Joyjatra), heart attack.
- Sue Wagner, 86, American politician, lieutenant governor of Nevada (1991–1995).
- Robert White, 89, American tenor, metastatic prostate cancer.

=== 18 ===
- Muhammad Abu Shahla, Palestinian militant, senior field commander of the Khan Younis brigade.
- Ann Barrett, 83, British oncologist.
- Józef Beker, 88, Polish Olympic cyclist (1964).
- Barry Bloom, 88, American immunologist.
- Mike Clampitt, 71, American politician, member of the North Carolina House of Representatives (2017–2019, since 2021), cancer.
- Lois Delmore, 76, American politician, member of the North Dakota House of Representatives (1994–2018).
- Steve Derewianchuk, 90, Canadian politician, Manitoba MLA (1973–1977).
- Nyan Dokpa, 58–59, Liberian musician.
- Yaakov Edri, 75, Israeli politician, MK (2003–2013), minister of health (2006) and development of Negev and the Galilee (2007–2009).
- Manuel Etura, 93, Spanish footballer (Athletic Bilbao).
- Tom Georgeson, 89, English actor (Between the Lines, A Fish Called Wanda, Notes on a Scandal).
- George H. Goble, 73, American scientist, Ig Nobel Prize winner (1996).
- Della Hadley, 97, American politician, member of the Missouri House of Representatives (1975–1981).
- Heisuke Hironaka, 94, Japanese mathematician (Hironaka's example, Hironaka decomposition), Fields Medal winner (1970).
- Mohammad Ebrahim Jannaati, 93, Iranian Marja'.
- Esmaeil Khatib, 64–65, Iranian cleric and politician, minister of intelligence (since 2021), airstrike.
- Robert Lombardo, 94, American composer and composition teacher.
- Jim Opperman, 72, American football player (Philadelphia Eagles).
- Kevin Sampson, 71, American artist.
- Taneaki Tanami, 93, Japanese politician, MP (1983–1993, 2000–2003), multiple organ failure.
- Finn-Erik Vinje, 90, Norwegian philologist.

=== 19 ===
- Md. Anwarul Azim Arif, 74, Bangladeshi academic administrator and banker, vice-chancellor of CU (2011–2015) and the IIUC (2021–2024), chairman of SIBL (2017–2021).
- Alfonso Bañón, 95, Spanish politician, deputy (1979–1982).
- Umberto Bossi, 84, Italian politician, MP (1987–2004, since 2008), twice MEP, and co-founder of Lega Nord.
- Terry Cox, 89, British drummer (Pentangle, The Humblebums).
- Raymond L. Ethington, 96, American paleontologist.
- Alessandro Finazzi Agrò, 84, Italian academic and biochemist.
- Khamid Gizatullin, 94, Russian economist.
- Péter Halász, 86, Hungarian agricultural engineer and ethnographer.
- Michael Bambang Hartono, 86, Indonesian banker, electronics and cigarettes industry executive, and bridge player, founder of Polytron and co-owner of Djarum (since 1963).
- Melli Irani, 93, Indian cinematographer (Sathyabhama, Line Bus, Ente Mohangal Poovaninju).
- Garry Leo, 81, Australian rugby league footballer (Balmain Tigers).
- Silvino Louro, 67, Portuguese football player (Vitória Setúbal, Benfica, national team) and coach.
- Jun Matsumoto, 75, Japanese politician, twice MP, deputy chief cabinet secretary (2008–2009), and chair of the National Public Safety Commission (2016–2017), stomach cancer.
- Houston McKelvey, 83, Irish priest, dean of Belfast (2001–2011).
- Mike Melvill, 85, South African test pilot (SpaceShipOne).
- Saleh Mohammadi, 19, Iranian wrestler, execution by hanging.
- Richard E. Myers, 91, American politician, member of the Iowa House of Representatives (1994–2003).
- Chuck Norris, 86, American martial artist and actor (Walker, Texas Ranger, Missing in Action, The Way of the Dragon).
- Lawrence O'Donnell, 93, Australian lieutenant general.
- Sam Raia, 77, American politician.
- Mannque Rho, 89, South Korean-French theoretical physicist.
- Peter Schrag, 94, American journalist and author.
- Vincenzo C. Vannicola, 93, American electrical engineer.
- Jeff Webb, 76, American cheerleading executive, founder of Varsity Spirit and the International Cheer Union, complications from a fall.
- Alevtina Yelesina, 71, Russian cross-country skier, Paralympic champion (1992, 1994).

=== 20 ===
- Aref, 84, Iranian pop singer.
- Chris Athens, American mastering engineer, complications from heart surgery.
- Linas Banys, 27, Lithuanian Olympic biathlete (2022).
- J. Michael Bishop, 90, American immunologist and academic administrator, Nobel Prize laureate (1989) and chancellor of UCSF (1998–2009), pneumonia.
- Nicholas Brendon, 54, American actor (Buffy the Vampire Slayer, Criminal Minds, Psycho Beach Party), cardiovascular disease.
- Alain Brillet, 78, French physicist.
- Rodger Brulotte, 79, Canadian sportscaster (Montreal Expos).
- Dennis Condrey, 76, American professional wrestler (CWA, Jim Crockett Promotions, WCW), complications from a fall.
- Marcos Conigliaro, 83, Argentine football player (Chacarita Juniors, Estudiantes LP) and manager (Unión de Santa Fe).
- Filaret Denysenko, 97, Ukrainian Orthodox hierarch, patriarch of Kyiv (since 1995).
- Robert Fox, 73, English film and television producer (The Hours, The Crown, Iris), prostate cancer.
- Diana Fuentes, 67, American journalist, head injury from a fall.
- Steve Gaines, 68, American pastor, president of the Southern Baptist Convention (2016–2018), kidney cancer.
- Smith Gilley, 86, American politician, member of the Texas House of Representatives (1975–1987).
- Sam Goodwin, 82, American football coach (Northwestern State Demons).
- Harvey P. Greenspan, 93, American mathematician.
- Jessie Jones, 75, American actress (Fudge).
- Ben Keaton, 69, Irish actor (Emmerdale, Casualty, Father Ted).
- Božo Koprivica, 75, Serbian essayist, dramatic adviser, and literary critic.
- Clive Leach, 91, English cricketer (Buckinghamshire, Durham, Warwickshire) and media executive, pneumonia.
- Yair Levy, 73, Israeli Haredi rabbi and politician, MK (1988–1992).
- Louie Louie, 63, American singer ("Sittin' in the Lap of Luxury").
- Bernard Luttikhuizen, 78, Dutch Olympic rower (1972).
- Raivo Mänd, 71, Estonian ecologist and zoologist.
- Julie Manning, 87, Tanzanian lawyer, judge and politician.
- Isabelle Mergault, 67, French actress (Pour cent briques, t'as plus rien..., Club de rencontres) and film director (You Are So Beautiful), cancer.
- Robert Mueller, 81, American lawyer (Mueller special counsel investigation), U.S. attorney for the Northern District of California (1998–2001), deputy attorney general (2001) and director of the FBI (2001–2013).
- Ali Mohammad Naini, 69, Iranian brigadier general, airstrike.
- Waldyr Pugliesi, 90, Brazilian politician, deputy (1987–1992).
- Leonid Radvinsky, 43, Ukrainian-American businessman (OnlyFans, MyFreeCams), cancer.
- Michel Rolland, 78, French oenologist, heart attack.
- David G. Schaeffer, 83, American mathematician.
- Vladimir Shumny, 92, Russian geneticist.
- Alton Sutnick, 97, American medical researcher and educator.
- Calvin Tomkins, 100, American author and art critic (The New Yorker), stroke.
- Reagan Wilson, 79, American actress (Blood Mania, The Beverly Hillbillies, The Big Valley) and Playboy model.
- Rick Young, 92, American Hall of Fame bullfighter and rodeo clown.

=== 21 ===
- Lala Alizadeh, 76, Azerbaijani scientist.
- Desmond Barrit, 81, Welsh actor (Alice through the Looking Glass, A Christmas Carol, Northanger Abbey).
- Bob Brennan, 84, New Zealand priest.
- Nigel Cayzer, 71, British businessman.
- Paolo Cirino Pomicino, 86, Italian politician, MEP (2004–2006), minister of public function (1988–1989) and budget (1989–1992).
- John R. Corbid, 81, American politician, member of the Minnesota House of Representatives (1975–1980).
- Xosé Antonio García Cotarelo, 84, Spanish lawyer and writer.
- Muhammad Kamal Hassouna, 84, Palestinian politician, minister of national economy (2007–2009).
- John L. Henderson, 93, American academic administrator.
- Ariosto Holanda, 87, Brazilian politician, three-time deputy.
- Steve Houben, 76, Belgian jazz saxophonist and flutist.
- Arthur E. Humphrey, 98, American chemical engineer.
- Willie Irvin, 96, American football player (Philadelphia Eagles).
- Amanda Lathlin, 49, Canadian politician, Manitoba MLA (since 2015).
- Michael Lyster, 71, Irish television presenter (The Sunday Game).
- Agosto Machado, American artist.
- Ralph Metcalf, 90, American politician, member of the North Dakota House of Representatives (1998–2012).
- Larry Mumper, 88, American politician, member of the Ohio House of Representatives (1997–2008).
- Juca de Oliveira, 91, Brazilian actor (Case of the Naves Brothers, The Sign of the City, De Onde Eu Te Vejo), pneumonia.
- Muhammad Habibullah Pathan, 87, Bangladeshi archaeologist, and Bangla Academy Literary Award-winning writer.
- Jessi Pierce, 37, American sports reporter (Minnesota Wild), injuries sustained in a house fire.
- Madhumita Raut, 59, Indian Odissi classical dancer, cardiac arrest.
- Phil Reavis, 89, American Olympic high jumper (1956).
- Rhoda Roberts, 66, Australian Aboriginal arts director, ovarian cancer.
- Angelo Romano, 91, Italian politician, mayor of Avellino (1989–1995).
- Daphne Selfe, 97, British model.
- Umar Shihab, 86, Indonesian Islamic scholar and politician, member of the House of Representatives (1992–1997).
- Jeff Smith, 91, English Hall of Fame motorcycle racer (Motocross World Championship).
- Carsten Träger, 52, German politician, MP (since 2013).
- Claus Wellenreuther, 91, German software developer (SAP SE).
- Jack Williams, 89, American journalist and editor (USA Today).
- Vladimir Zantaria, 72, Abkhazian poet and politician, chairman of the State Television and Radio Broadcasting Company (1993–1994) and minister for culture (1999–2001).

=== 22 ===
- Rómulo Berruti, 88, Argentine journalist (Clarín) and film critic.
- Ed Blaine, 86, American football player (Green Bay Packers, Philadelphia Eagles).
- Ronnie Bowman, 64, American bluegrass musician (Lonesome River Band), traffic collision.
- Gualtiero Calboli, 94, Italian linguist.
- Jerry Hanlon, 96, American football player and coach (Miami Redskins, Michigan Wolverines).
- Per Hegna, 80, Norwegian tennis player.
- Hermann Huppen, 87, Belgian comic book creator (Jeremiah).
- Božena Jirků, 78, Czech journalist and editor, executive director of Charter 77 Foundation (2002–2023).
- Lionel Jospin, 88, French politician, prime minister (1997–2002), minister of national education (1988–1992), and member of the Constitutional Council (2015–2019), complications from surgery.
- Sylvia Kersenbaum, 84, Argentine pianist, composer and teacher.
- Marcos Leite, 73, Brazilian Olympic basketball player (1972, 1980, 1984).
- Anthony Lewis, 93, English cricketer (Cambridge University, Staffordshire).
- Phạm Minh Mẫn, 92, Vietnamese Roman Catholic cardinal, coadjutor bishop of Mỹ Tho (1993–1998) and archbishop of Ho Chi Minh City (1998–2014).
- Datta Meghe, 89, Indian politician, MP (1991–1999, 2002–2014) and four-time Maharashtra MLC.
- Andrew Pawley, 84, Australian linguist.
- Aloysius Pieris, 91, Sri Lankan Jesuit priest and theologian.
- Helen Rankin, 89, American politician, member of the Ohio House of Representatives (1978–1994).
- Michael Aaron Rockland, 90, American writer.
- Catherine Saunders, 83, New Zealand broadcasting personality (Beauty and the Beast, Mobil Song Quest) and public relations executive (New Zealand Dairy Board).
- David Simon, 63, American real estate developer, CEO of Simon Property Group, cancer.
- Celeste M. Stiehl, 100, American politician, member of the Illinois House of Representatives (1975–1983).
- Toomas Tein, 70, Estonian politician, MP (2003–2005).

=== 23 ===
- Rodolfo Acuña, 93, American historian and educator.
- José Bengoa, 81, Chilean historian and anthropologist.
- Stan Berry, 71, American politician, member of the Arkansas House of Representatives (2003–2008, since 2019).
- Gerson Brenner, 66, Brazilian actor (Rainha da Sucata, Perigosas Peruas, Corpo Dourado), multiple organ failure.
- Nancy W. Cook, 89, American politician, member of the Delaware Senate (1974–2010).
- Manuel Escudero, 79, Spanish economist and politician, deputy (2003–2004) and ambassador to the OECD (2018–2024).
- Ivy Hooks, 84, American mathematician and aerospace engineer.
- Dick Hunter, 92, American football player (Miami Redskins) and coach.
- Daniel Karaba, 77, Kenyan politician, senator (2013–2017).
- François Morlaes, 82, French rugby union player (CA Bègles).
- Lucy Nieto de Samper, 102, Colombian journalist and writer.
- Valerie Perrine, 82, American actress (Slaughterhouse-Five, Lenny, Superman), complications from Parkinson's disease.
- Nicholas Pope, 77, Australian-British artist.
- Jean-Bernard Racine, 85, Swiss geographer and academic.
- Gaspare Russo, 98, Italian politician, president of Campania (1976–1979) and mayor of Salerno (1970–1974).
- Saeed Shamghadri, Iranian academic (Iran University of Science and Technology), airstrike.
- Nkosentsha Shezi, 50, South African politician, MP (since 2024).
- Yury Shvytkin, 60, Russian politician, deputy (since 2016).
- David Sklansky, 78, American poker player and author, heart failure.
- Peter Stead, 83, Welsh writer.
- Sean Stevens, 47, American visual artist (2007 Boston Mooninite panic), cancer. (death announced on this date)
- Leonard Swidler, 97, American academic.
- Chip Taylor, 86, American singer and songwriter ("Angel of the Morning", "Wild Thing"), cancer.
- Tin Myint Aung, 58, Burmese football player (Finance and Revenue, national team) and manager (national team).
- Marica Vilcek, 89, American art historian.
- Wu Dexin, 89, Chinese materials scientist, member of the Chinese Academy of Sciences.

=== 24 ===
- Theodore L. Brown, 97, American scientist and author.
- Makarios Djan, 70, Ghanaian Olympic sprinter (1984).
- Benjamin Clement Eghan, Ghanaian civil servant.
- Pavlo Fedorenko, 89, Ukrainian academic and mining engineer.
- Edna Foa, 88, Israeli psychologist.
- Willi Forrer, 90, Swiss Olympic alpine skier (1960).
- Biruté Galdikas, 79, Canadian primatologist, conservationist (The Trimates) and author, founder of the Orangutan Foundation International, lung cancer.
- Charles Gross, 91, American film composer (Turner & Hooch, Air America, Punchline).
- Larry Kennedy, 76, Canadian politician, New Brunswick MLA (1987–2010).
- Tracy Kidder, 80, American writer (The Soul of a New Machine, Mountains Beyond Mountains), Pulitzer Prize winner (1982), lung cancer.
- Guenter Lewy, 102, German-born American author and political scientist.
- Mai Murdmaa, 87, Estonian choreographer, ballerina, and ballet master.
- Gino Paoli, 91, Italian singer-songwriter ("Il cielo in una stanza", "Senza fine", "Sapore di sale") and politician, deputy (1987–1992).
- Chime Rinpoche, 84, Tibetan lama and teacher.
- Bob Rossell, 89, American racing driver.
- Carlo Russolillo, 69, Italian Olympic boxer (1980).
- Mel Schilling, 53, Australian television presenter (Married at First Sight), colon cancer.
- Esteri Tebandeke, 41, Ugandan filmmaker, actress (Imperial Blue), and visual artist.
- David Trottier, 77, American screenwriter, consultant and author.
- Jerome Dhas Varuvel, 74, Indian Roman Catholic prelate, bishop of Kuzhithurai (2014–2020), complications from dementia and Parkinson's disease.
- Reg Weaver, 86, American labor leader.
- Western Dreamer, 32, American Standardbred racehorse, Pacing Triple Crown winner (1997).
- Zhang Xuefeng, 41, Chinese education consultant and influencer, cardiac arrest.

=== 25 ===
- Abdikalyk Akmatov, 71, Kyrgyz actor.
- John Andreassen, 82, Norwegian television producer.
- Wilson Bombarda, 95, Brazilian Olympic basketball player (1956).
- Dash Crofts, 87, American musician (Seals & Crofts) and songwriter ("Summer Breeze", "Diamond Girl"), complications from heart surgery.
- Toumba Diakité, 57, Guinean politician and convicted criminal, peritonitis.
- Harold Ellis, 100, English surgeon.
- Manuel Estella, 86, Spanish politician, president of the Cortes of Castile and León (1991–2003).
- Paula Hollinger, 85, American politician, member of the Maryland Senate (1987–2007), leukemia.
- Janusz Jasiński, 97, Polish historian.
- Alexander Kluge, 94, German author (Air Raid) and film director (Artists Under the Big Top: Perplexed, The Assault of the Present on the Rest of Time).
- Dolors Lamarca, 82, Spanish philologist and librarian, pneumonia.
- William Lukuvi, 70, Tanzanian politician and presidential adviser, MP (since 2015) and minister of lands (2015–2022), heart attack.
- Burchell McPherson, 74, Jamaican Roman Catholic prelate, bishop of Montego Bay (2013–2023).
- James Meechan, 95, Scottish-Canadian painter.
- Peter Messent, 79, British academic. (death announced on this date)
- Jerry Moriarty, 88, American artist, cartoonist and writer.
- Tordis Ørjasæter, 99, Norwegian literary critic.
- Nikolai Liutsianovich Orlov, 73, Russian herpetologist.
- Loana Petrucciani, 48, French reality television personality (Loft Story).
- José Maria Ricciardi, 71, Portuguese banker.
- Esther Roord, 61, Dutch actress.
- Pat Steir, 87, American painter and printmaker.
- Imre Taveter, 58, Estonian Olympic sailor (2000, 2004).
- József Varró, 82, Hungarian Olympic equestrian (1972, 1980).
- Geoff Vowden, 84, English footballer (Birmingham City, Aston Villa, Nottingham Forest).
- David Winnick, 92, British politician, MP (1966–1970, 1979–2017).
- Isaías Zarazaga, 98, Spanish veterinarian, academic and politician, deputy (1982–1989) and senator (1977–1979).

=== 26 ===
- Noelia Castillo, 25, Spanish activist and paraplegic patient, voluntarily euthanized by lethal injection.
- Ken Clay, 71, American baseball player (New York Yankees, Texas Rangers, Seattle Mariners), heart and kidney issues.
- David B. Cornstein, 87, American diplomat, ambassador to Hungary (2018–2020).
- Grey J. Dimenna, 72, American academic administrator, president of Monmouth University (2017–2019), traffic collision.
- Nathan Farb, 85, American photographer.
- Jean-Pierre Faye, 100, French philosopher (horseshoe theory) and writer.
- Christopher Haskins, Baron Haskins, 88, Irish-born businessman and life peer, member of the House of Lords (1998–2020).
- Ahmad Kaabour, 70, Lebanese singer.
- László Kordos, 75, Hungarian geologist and palaeontologist.
- Hiroki Kosai, 92, Japanese astronomer (3391 Sinon).
- Sir Colin Mackay, 82, British judge and barrister, High Court judge (2001–2013), dementia.
- William Murphy, 85, American Roman Catholic prelate, auxiliary bishop of Boston (1995–2001) and bishop of Rockville Centre (2001–2017).
- Epeli Nailatikau, 84, Fijian military officer and politician, president (2009–2015), speaker of the House of Representatives (2001–2006), and vice-president (2009).
- Mayumi Ogawa, 86, Japanese actress (Vengeance Is Mine, Zatoichi's Vengeance, Farewell to the Ark).
- Mahbuba Rahman, 91, Bangladeshi playback singer (Mukh O Mukhosh, The Day Shall Dawn).
- E. A. Rajendran, 71, Indian actor (Pranayavarnangal, Daya, Narasimham) and stage director.
- Mary Rand, 86, British track and field athlete, Olympic champion (1964).
- Barret Robbins, 52, American football player (Oakland Raiders).
- Ross the Boss, 72, American guitarist (Manowar, The Dictators), complications from amyotrophic lateral sclerosis.
- Jean Sagols, 87, French actor, screenwriter and television director, cerebral haemorrhage.
- Rosa Salikhova, 81, Russian volleyball player, Olympic champion (1968, 1972).
- Nana Akuoko Sarpong, 87, Ghanaian traditional ruler and politician, MP (1979–1981), secretary for health (1988–1991) and internal affairs (1991–1992).
- Giuseppe Savoldi, 79, Italian footballer (Bologna, Napoli, national team).
- Richard Shoemaker, 74, American politician, member of the Wisconsin State Assembly (1979–1989) and the Wisconsin State Senate (1989), complications from Lewy body dementia.
- Ronald H. Spector, 83, American military historian, cancer.
- Alireza Tangsiri, 63–64, Iranian naval officer, commander of the IRGC Navy (since 2018), airstrike.
- James Tolkan, 94, American actor (Back to the Future, Top Gun, Dick Tracy).
- Orlando Wiet, 60, Surinamese-Dutch mixed martial artist.

=== 27 ===
- David Cabrero, 49, Spanish Olympic track cyclist (2000).
- Don Childers, 94, American politician, member of the Florida Senate (1975–1990).
- Gian Paolo Chiti, 87, Italian pianist.
- William S. Cleveland, 83, American computer scientist (S).
- Alex Cropley, 75, Scottish footballer (Hibernian, Aston Villa, national team).
- Richard C. Edgley, 90, American LDS Church general authority, first counselor in the Presiding Bishopric (1995–2012).
- Rupie Edwards, 80, Jamaican reggae singer.
- Jon Dee Graham, 67, American musician (The Skunks, True Believers).
- Kitty Harrison, 91, American college tennis coach (North Carolina Tar Heels).
- Doug Irwin, 76, American luthier.
- Rose Kingdon, 65, Canadian broadcaster (The Canadian Press).
- Henry Lee, 87, Taiwanese-American forensic scientist (killing of JonBenét Ramsey, murder trial of O. J. Simpson, 9/11 forensic investigation) and biochemist.
- Lin Yuan-lang, 85, Taiwanese politician, magistrate of Nantou County (1989–1997).
- Tom Nieto, 65, American baseball player (Minnesota Twins, Philadelphia Phillies) and coach (New York Yankees), heart attack.
- Carlos Orgambide, 95, Argentine film director (Queridas amigas), cinematographer, and screenwriter.
- Larry Price, 91, American football player (Hawaii Rainbow Warriors) and radio host (MidWeek, Perry & Price).
- Michael Sather, 78, Canadian politician, British Columbia MLA (2005–2013).
- Bob Schmetterer, 82, American advertising executive, chairman and CEO of Euro RSCG (1997–2004). (death announced on this date)
- Franco Tentorio, 81, Italian politician, mayor of Bergamo (2009–2014).
- Hiroyuki Wakabayashi, 77, Japanese architect.

=== 28 ===
- Gino Agnese, 90, Italian essayist and writer.
- Werner Asam, 81, German actor (Trokadero) and director.
- Maria Badia i Cutchet, 78, Spanish politician, MEP (2004–2014).
- Joey Browner, 65, American football player (Minnesota Vikings, Tampa Bay Buccaneers).
- Alfonso Cavaliere, 92, Italian astrophysicist and cosmologist.
- DJ Dan, 57, American house music DJ and producer, heart attack.
- Richard Donat, 84, Canadian actor (Haven, Emily of New Moon, The Weight of Water).
- Alex Duong, 42, American comedian and actor (Blue Bloods, Dexter, Death Valley), septic shock.
- Mary Beth Hurt, 79, American actress (The World According to Garp, The Age of Innocence, Interiors), complications from Alzheimer's disease.
- Wayne Jernigan, 84, American businessman and musician.
- Marinella, 87, Greek singer ("Dio Portes Echi i Zoi", "Giati Fovase"), complications from a stroke.
- Hank Nichols, 89, American Hall of Fame college basketball referee.
- Dallas O'Neill, 83, Australian rugby league (South Sydney Rabbitohs) and union (national team) player.
- Jeff Siemon, 75, American football player (Minnesota Vikings).
- Lal Singh, 83, Indian politician, six-time Punjab MLA.
- Vijaypat Singhania, 87, Indian textile industry executive, chairman of the Raymond Group (1980–2000) and sheriff of Mumbai (2005–2006).
- Ken Smale, 92, Australian footballer (Collingwood) and music director.
- Julio Solaun, 84, Spanish Olympic field hockey player (1964, 1968).
- Juwono Sudarsono, 84, Indonesian diplomat and politician, ambassador to the United Kingdom (2003–2004), minister of education (1998–1999) and twice of defense.
- Liamine Zéroual, 84, Algerian politician, president (1994–1999) and minister of defense (1993–1999).

=== 29 ===
- Rasim Balayev, 77, Azerbaijani actor (Nesimi, Babek, Dada Gorgud), complications from diabetes and lung cancer.
- Rahul Banerjee, 42, Indian actor (Chirodini Tumi Je Amar, Pati Parameshwar, Zulfiqar), drowned.
- Glen Baxter, 82, English artist, carcinomatosis.
- Kim Bukhantsov, 94, Russian Olympic discus thrower (1956, 1960, 1964).
- Allan Carswell, 92, Canadian physicist, founder of Optech.
- Marsha Wilson Chall, 72, American educator and author.
- Chang Ung, 87, North Korean basketball player (national team) and sports administrator, president of the ITF (2002–2015) and member of the IOC (1996–2018).
- Sir Neil Cossons, 87, British historian and museum director.
- Alberto Coutinho, 56, American politician, member of the New Jersey General Assembly (1997–1998, 2008–2013), traffic collision.
- Jeffrey Paul Cutlip, 76, American serial killer and rapist.
- Greg Elmore, 79, American drummer (Quicksilver Messenger Service, The Brogues).
- Dorothi Fox, 96, American actress (Bananas, Three Days of the Condor, After the Fall).
- Lewis Goldberg, 94, American personality psychologist and academic.
- Major M. Goodman, 87, American maize geneticist and plant breeder.
- Joël Henry, 63, French footballer (Nantes, Brest, Nice).
- Myron Arms Hofer, 94, American psychiatrist.
- Gerard Kamper, 75, Dutch Olympic cyclist (1972).
- Volodymyr Komarov, 62, Ukrainian comedian, actor and musician.
- Vladimir Mikhaylov, 86, Russian footballer (Volga Gorky, Torpedo Moscow, Trud Voronezh).
- Wiesław Myśliwski, 94, Polish novelist.
- Ádám Nádasdy, 79, Hungarian linguist and poet.
- Barbara Nodine, 88, American psychologist.
- Villen Novak, 88, Ukrainian film director (Tuning Fork).
- Bill Riley, 75, Canadian ice hockey player (Washington Capitals, Winnipeg Jets) and coach (Moncton Wildcats), cancer.
- David Riondino, 73, Italian singer-songwriter, actor (The Night of the Shooting Stars, Cavalli si nasce, Ilona Arrives with the Rain) and writer.
- J Robinson, 79, American Hall of Fame wrestler (1972 Summer Olympics) and coach (Minnesota Golden Gophers).
- Tim Sandlin, 75, American novelist and screenwriter (Skipped Parts, The Right Kind of Wrong).
- Williametta Spencer, 98, American composer and musicologist.
- Ben Stevenson, 89, British ballet dancer and teacher.
- Willy Ustad, 79, Norwegian novelist.
- Laurie Webb, 101, Welsh actor (Doctor Who, Paul Temple, Doomwatch).
- Karsten Wettberg, 84, German football manager (SpVgg Landshut, SpVgg Unterhaching, 1860 Munich).

=== 30 ===
- Carl Bonafede, 85, American music manager (The Buckinghams, Daughters of Eve) and musician.
- Selemani Bungara, 64, Tanzanian politician, MP (2010–2020), kidney failure.
- Sir Barry Curtis, 87, New Zealand politician, mayor of Manukau City (1983–2007).
- Jean M. Doerge, 88, American politician, member of the Louisiana House of Representatives (1998–2012).
- Deborah Dultzin, 80, Mexican astrophysicist.
- Melvin Edwards, 88, American sculptor.
- Tony Godden, 70, English footballer (Chelsea, Peterborough United, West Bromwich Albion).
- Vassilis Goumas, 79, Greek basketball player (Panellinios, AEK, Ilysiakos).
- John Harris, 92, American football player (Oakland Raiders).
- Léo Houziaux, 94, Belgian astronomer.
- Knut Midgaard, 95, Norwegian political scientist.
- Christopher North, 75, American keyboardist (Ambrosia), throat cancer.
- Dennis J. O'Callaghan, 85, American virologist, cancer.
- Booker Reese, 66, American football player (Tampa Bay Buccaneers, Los Angeles Rams, Atlanta Falcons).
- Tony Rivers, 85, English singer (Harmony Grass), sepsis complicated by Alzheimer's disease.
- Chan Santokhi, 67, Surinamese politician, president (2020–2025), minister of justice (2005–2010), and twice MNA.
- Charles E. Scott, 90, American philosopher.
- Rezvi Sheriff, 77, Sri Lankan nephrologist and physician.
- James Stannage, 76, British radio talk show host, cancer.
- Julia Sutton, 87, English actress (Half a Sixpence, Pickwick, Albert and Victoria) and singer.
- Sir Hugh Sykes, 93, English industrialist and investor.
- Willie Watson, 76, Scottish footballer (Motherwell, Dundee, Manchester United).
- Carlos Westendorp, 89, Spanish diplomat and politician, minister of foreign affairs (1995–1996), high representative for Bosnia and Herzegovina (1997–1999), and MEP (1999–2003).
- Michelangelo Zurletti, 89, Italian musicologist and essayist.

=== 31 ===
- Armando Alves, 90, Portuguese painter.
- Bob Atha, 65, American football player (Ohio State Buckeyes), cancer.
- Siri Aurdal, 88, Norwegian painter, graphic designer and sculptor.
- Claudio Bordignon, 75, Italian geneticist.
- Alec Cobbe, 81, Irish artist and decorator.
- William Rankin Dill, 95, American academic administrator.
- Federico Enriques, 84, Italian publisher and politician, senator (2006–2008).
- Jamshid Eshaghi, 64, Iranian brigadier general, airstrike.
- Lionel Fernando, 86, Sri Lankan-born Australian cricketer (Ceylon, Walsden Cricket Club).
- Lili Hinstin, 48, French film producer and artistic director (Locarno Film Festival, Entrevues Belfort Film Festival).
- Nicola Imbriaco, 96, Italian politician, senator (1983–1992).
- Eduard Koksharov, 50, Russian handball player and coach, Olympic champion (2000) and bronze medalist (2004).
- Jean-Paul Krassinsky, 53, French comics artist.
- Kees Kuijs, 94, Dutch footballer (NAC Breda, national team).
- Bill Leader, 96, English record producer (Hearken to the Witches Rune) and engineer.
- Stephen Lewis, 88, Canadian politician and diplomat, Ontario MPP (1963–1978), U.N. special envoy for HIV/AIDS in Africa (2001–2006), and ambassador to the U.N. (1984–1988), abdominal cancer.
- Juan Maeso, 84, Spanish anaesthetist and convicted criminal.
- Sergi Mas Balaguer, 95, Spanish-born Andorran sculptor and cultural activist.
- William L. Maxwell, 91, American engineer.
- Borislav Mihaylov, 63, Bulgarian football player (Levski Sofia, national team) and administrator, twice president of the Bulgarian Football Union, complications from a stroke.
- Rory O'Hanlon, 92, Irish politician, TD (1977–2011), minister of health (1987–1991) and environment (1991–1992).
- Petr Pleva, 66, Czech politician, MP (1996–2010).
- Nicolae Proca, 77, Moldovan politician, deputy (1990–1994).
- Zsuzsa Radnóti, 88, Hungarian dramatist.
- Teresinha Soares, 99, Brazilian pop artist.
- Nikolay Solovyov, 66, Russian actor and theatre director.
