= Krzycki =

Krzycki is a Polish surname. Notable people with the surname include:

- Andrzej Krzycki (1482–1537), Polish writer and archbishop
- Jakub Derech-Krzycki (1970–2026), Polish politician
- Leo Krzycki (1881–1966), American socialist and labor leader
- Łukasz Krzycki (born 1984), Polish footballer
