= Péter Halász =

Péter Halász may refer to:

- Péter Halász (agricultural engineer) (1939–2026), Hungarian agricultural engineer and ethnographer
- Péter Halász (actor) (1944–2006), Hungarian actor and director
- Péter Halász (conductor) (born 1976), Hungarian conductor and pianist
