= Francine Demichel =

French academic and jurist (1938–2026)

- Born: Francine Batailler; 31 October 1938; Marseille, France
- Died: 14 March 2026 (aged 87)
- Occupations: Jurist, academic

Francine Demichel (French: [fʁɑ̃sˈin dəmiʃˈɛl]; née Batailler; 31 October 1938 – 14 March 2026) was a French academic and jurist. She served as president of Paris 8 University from 1987 to 1991 and served in the cabinet of Claude Allègre who served as minister of national education during the administration of President Jacques Chirac.

Demichel died on 14 March 2026, at the age of 87.

== Publications ==
- Droit électoral (1973)
- Les dictatures européennes (1973)
- Institutions et pouvoirs en France une traduction institutionnelle du capitalisme monopoliste d'État (1975)
- Pouvoir et libertés : essai de typologie des libertés dans le capitalisme monopoliste d'État (1978)
- Cuba (1979)
- La lutte idéologique dans la France contemporaine (1982)
- Introduction critique au droit international (1986)
- Éléments pour une théorie des relations internationales (1986)
- Au nom de quoi ? : libres propos d'une juriste sur la médicalisation de la vie (2006)

== Decorations ==
- Officer of the Legion of Honour
- Commander of the Ordre des Palmes académiques
