= Antón Louro =

Spanish politician (1952–2026)

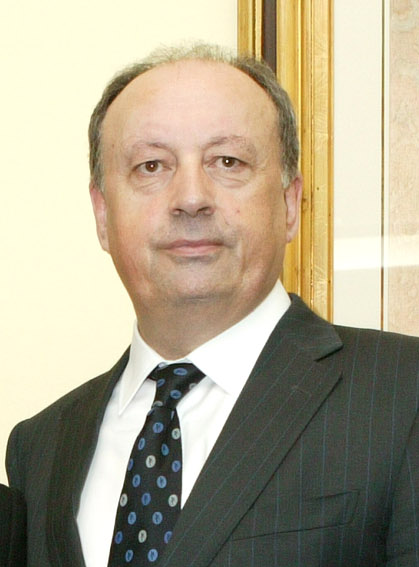
- Louro in 2009

Member of the Congress of Deputies for Pontevedra
- In office 29 March 2004 – 26 April 2009

Member of the Parliament of Galicia
- In office 1997–2004

Personal details
- Born: Antonio Louro Goyanes; 15 March 1952 Carnota, Spain
- Died: 12 March 2026 (aged 73) Pontevedra, Spain
- Party: PSOE
- Education: University of Santiago de Compostela
- Occupation: Academic

Antonio Louro Goyanes (15 March 1952 – 12 March 2026) was a Spanish politician. A member of the Spanish Socialist Workers' Party, he served in the Parliament of Galicia from 1997 to 2004 and in the Congress of Deputies from 2004 to 2009.

Louro died in Pontevedra on 12 March 2026, at the age of 73.
