= Juan Maeso =

Spanish anaesthetist and convicted criminal (1942–2026)

Juan Maeso Vélez (1942 – 31 March 2026) was a Spanish anaesthetist who was sentenced to 1,933 years in prison for infecting hundreds of patients with hepatitis C, after using the same needles to give both himself and the patients opioids.

Maeso infected 275 people between 1988 and 1997. He was sentenced to 1,933 years in prison, but the most he could serve under Spanish law was 20 years. Maeso was ordered to pay 500,000 euros (US$680,000) to each victim or their survivors.

He was released from prison in 2023, after 15 years of imprisonment, due to his medical condition.

Maeso died at a hospital on 31 March 2026, at the age of 84.
