= Pascal Edoh Agbove =

Togolese businessman and civil servant (1970/1971–2026)

- Born: 1970 or 1971
- Died: March 10, 2026 (aged 55); Lomé, Togo
- Occupations: Businessman; Civil servant

Pascal Edoh Agbove (1970 or 1971 – 10 March 2026) was a Togolese businessman and civil servant.

== Life and career ==
Born around 1970, Edoh Agbove served many years in Togolese civil society, serving as executive director of the NGO Initiative des Jeunes pour le Développement, which engaged in entrepreneurship and community engagement. He was also the head of consulting firm SIM-Afrique, which specialized in supporting organizations, public policy, and development strategies. He regularly spoke on issues related to entrepreneurship, local governance, and decentralization in Togo, representing the country at the Global Entrepreneurship Network in 2020. He often appeared on Togolese media outlets during his debates for decentralization and local governance. In December 2025, he was elected president of the board of directors of the Fédération des Organisations Non Gouvernementales du Togo.

Edoh Agbove died in Lomé on 10 March 2026, at the age of 55.
