= Natale Amodeo =

Italian politician (1933–2026)

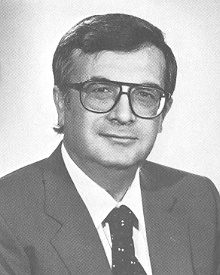
- Amodeo in 1979

Member of the Chamber of Deputies of Italy for Catania-Ragusa
- In office 18 June 1979 – 22 April 1992

Personal details
- Born: 1 June 1933 Pozzallo, Italy
- Died: 2 March 2026 (aged 92) Pozzallo, Italy
- Party: PSI
- Occupation: Clerk

Natale Amodeo (1 June 1933 – 2 March 2026) was an Italian politician. A member of the Italian Socialist Party, he served in the Chamber of Deputies from 1979 to 1992.

Amodeo died in Pozzallo on 2 March 2026, at the age of 92.
