= Klaus Kribben =

German politician (1937–2026)

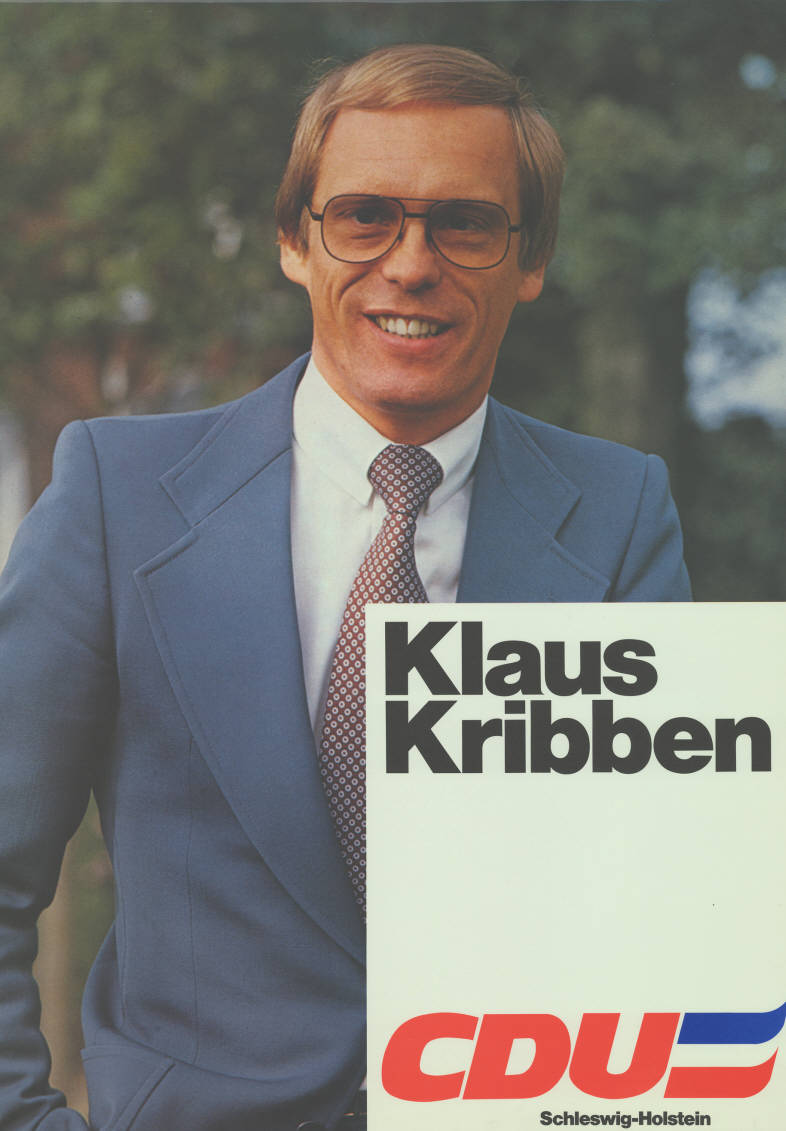
- Kribben in 1979

Member of the Landtag of Schleswig-Holstein
- In office 26 May 1975 – 23 April 1996

Personal details
- Born: 21 October 1937 Cologne, Gau Cologne-Aachen, Germany
- Died: 9 March 2026 (aged 88)
- Party: CDU
- Education: LMU Munich
- Occupation: Lawyer

Klaus Kribben (21 October 1937 – 9 March 2026) was a German politician. A member of the Christian Democratic Union, he served in the Landtag of Schleswig-Holstein from 1975 to 1996.

Kribben died on 9 March 2026, at the age of 88.
