= Slava Racheva =

Bulgarian actress and puppeteer (1938–2026)

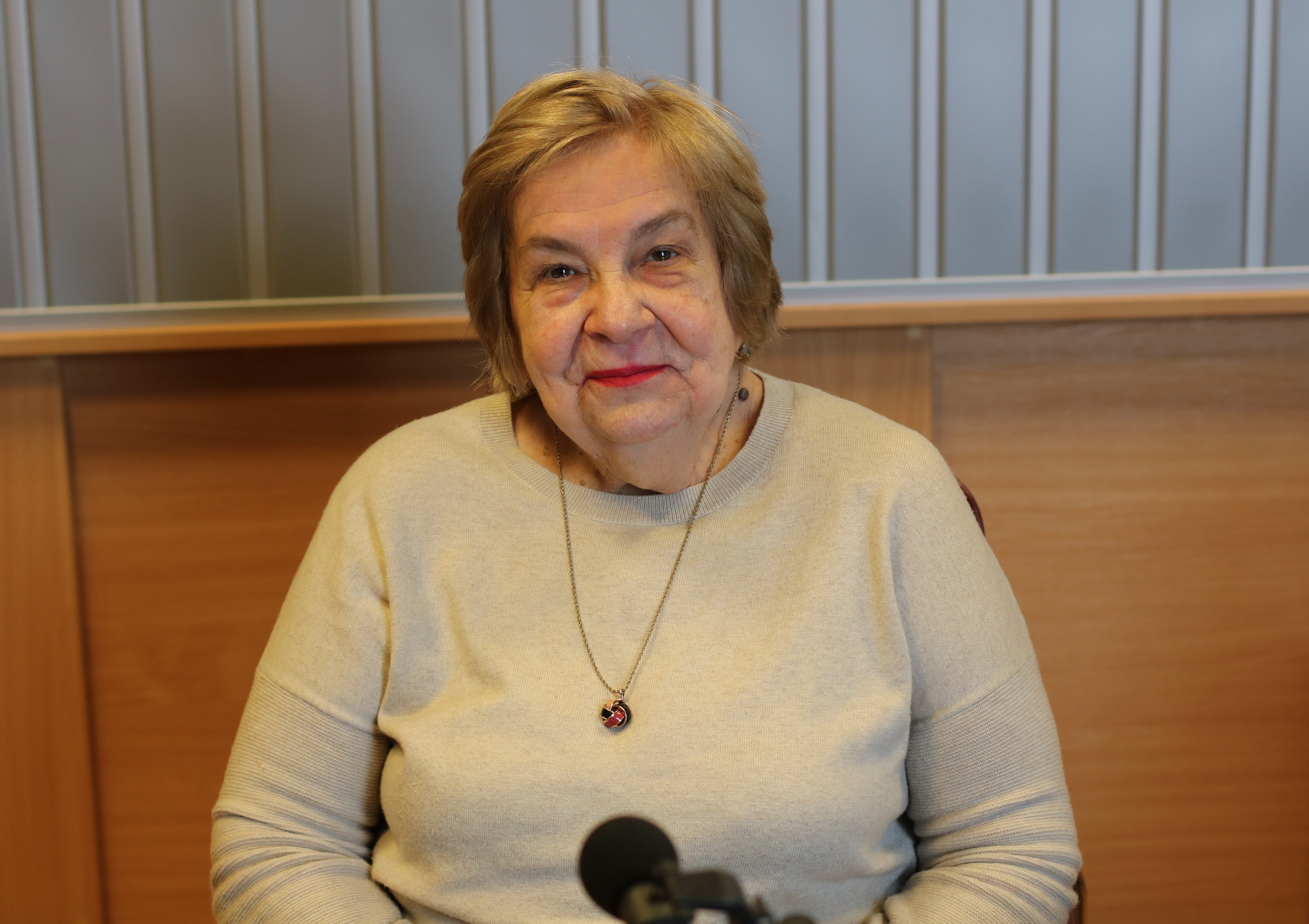
Racheva in 2018

Slava Dimitrova Racheva (Bulgarian: Слава Димитрова Рачева; 23 April 1938 – 17 March 2026) was a Bulgarian actress in puppet theatre.

== Early life and education ==
Racheva was born in Sofia on 23 April 1938. She studied drama acting at the Krastyo Sarafov National Academy for Theatre and Film.

== Career ==
At the age of 17, Racheva made her stage debut at the National Puppet Theatre, later known as Sofia Puppet Theatre. Her role as Max in Max and Moritz, Winnie the Pooh, Peter Rabbit in Rabbit School and the Little Princess were remembered as favorites in children's entertainment in Bulgaria. Apart from the puppet theatre, she was also active in radio and television and in 1961, she played the character, Pedya Man-Span Tall, Beard a Yard Long, in the children's program, Good Night, Children. She is also known for Olga's Strange Story (1995) and Racket (1997). She also played Flora in Flora, Fauna and Merry Weather (1959).

== Death ==
Racheva died on 17 March 2026, at the age of 87.

== Awards ==
Racheva received the Golden Age Award, Bulgaria's highest recognition in the cultural field. She received the Golden Quill Award in 2018.
