= Zsuzsa Radnóti =

Hungarian dramatist (1938–2026)

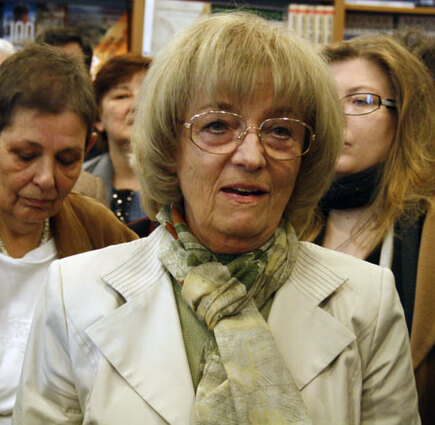
- Radnóti in 2010
- Born: 12 February 1938; Budapest, Hungary
- Died: 31 March 2026 (aged 88)
- Education: Eötvös Loránd University
- Occupation: Dramatist

Zsuzsa Radnóti (12 February 1938 – 31 March 2026) was a Hungarian dramatist. She was a recipient of the Hungarian Knight Cross of Merit (1996).

Radnóti died on 31 March 2026, at the age of 88.
