= Nicola Imbriaco =

Italian politician (1929–2026)

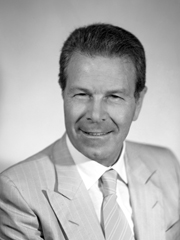

Member of the Senate
- In office 12 July 1983 – 22 April 1992

Personal details
- Born: 12 September 1929 Vallo della Lucania, Campania, Italy
- Died: 31 March 2026 (aged 96)
- Party: Italian Communist Party; Democratic Party of the Left
- Profession: Politician

Nicola Imbriaco (12 September 1929 – 31 March 2026) was an Italian politician who served as Senator for two legislatures (1983–1992). He died on 31 March 2026, at the age of 96.
