= Nikolay Solovyov (actor) =

Russian actor and theatre director (1960–2026)

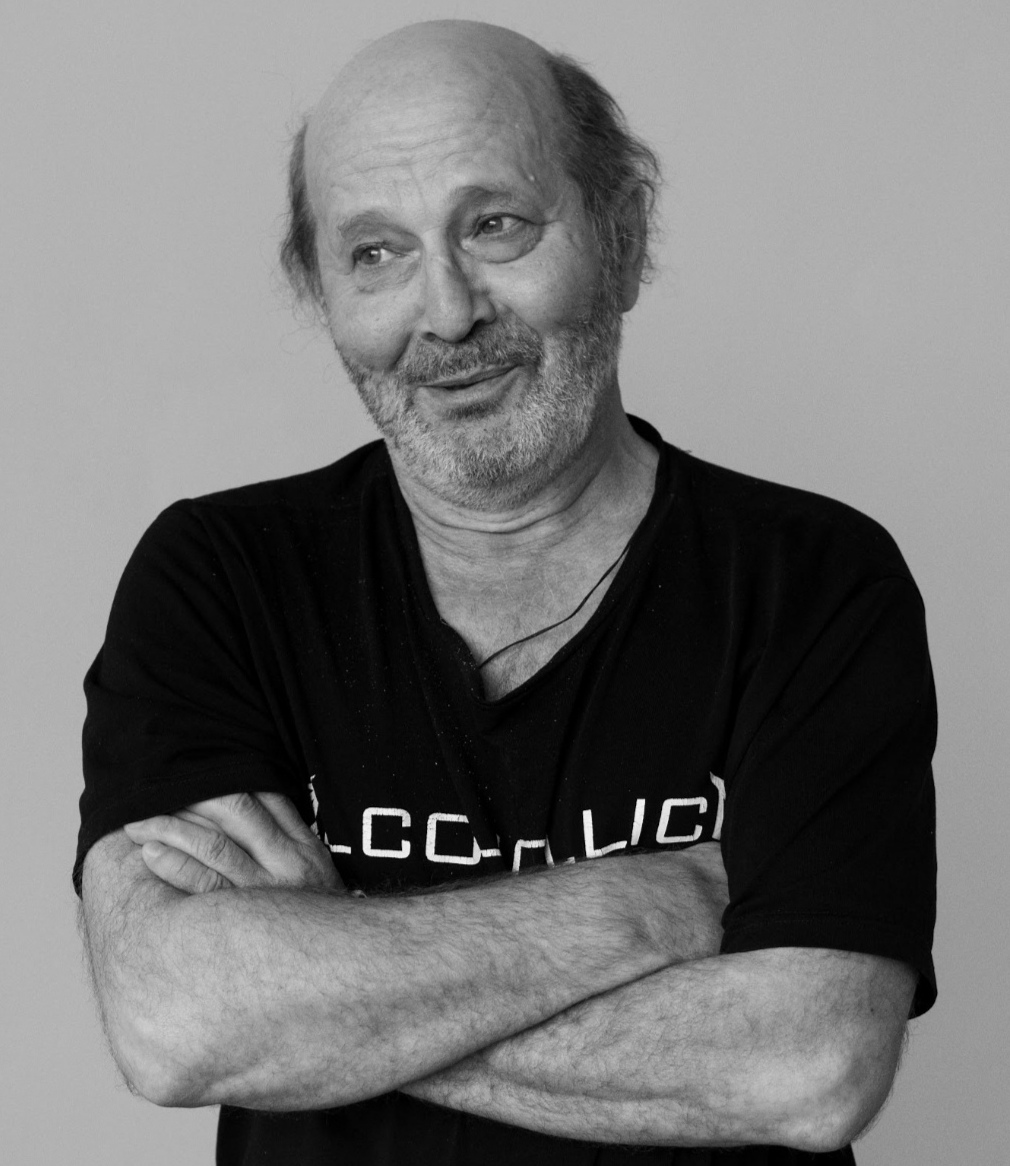
- Solovyov in 2024
- Born: Nikolay Alekseyevich Solovyov; 7 March 1960; Suzun, Suzunsky District, Novosibirsk Oblast, Russian SFSR, USSR
- Died: 31 March 2026 (aged 66); Novosibirsk, Russia
- Occupations: Actor, theatre director

Nikolay Alekseyevich Solovyov (Russian: Никола́й Алексе́евич Соловьёв; 7 March 1960 – 31 March 2026) was a Russian actor and theatre director. A recipient of the Merited Artist of the Russian Federation, he was best known for his appearances in the Russian criminal drama television series Streets of Broken Lights.

Solovyov died in Novosibirsk on 31 March 2026, at the age of 66.
