= Zsigmond Ritoók =

Hungarian classical philologist (1929–2026)

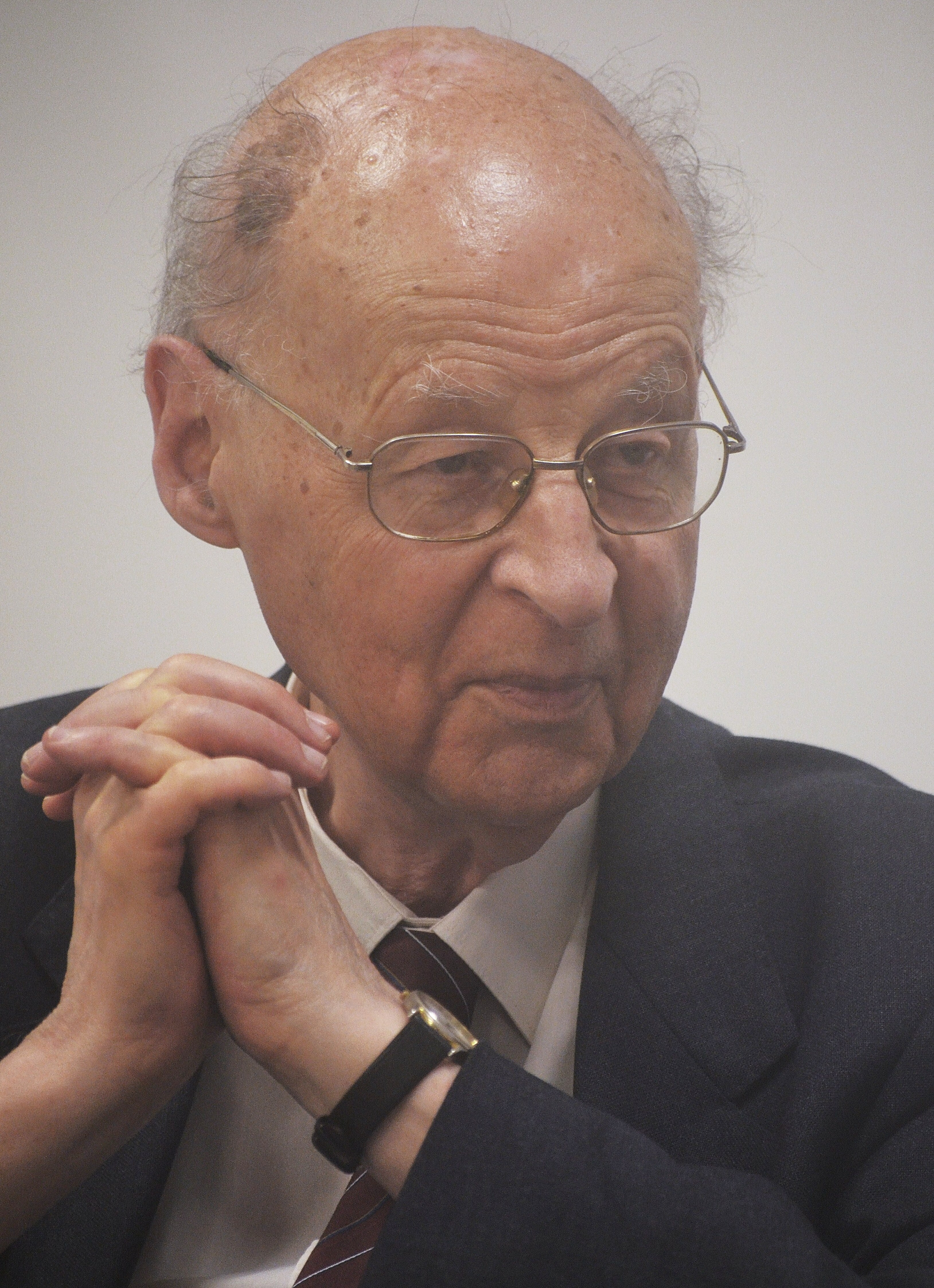
- Ritoók in 2015
- Born: 28 September 1929; Budapest, Hungary
- Died: 13 March 2026 (aged 96)
- Education: Eötvös Loránd University
- Occupation: Classical philologist

Zsigmond Ritoók (28 September 1929 – 13 March 2026) was a Hungarian classical philologist. A member of the Hungarian Academy of Sciences, the Austrian Academy of Sciences, and the Academia Europaea he was a recipient of the Hungarian Middle Cross of Merit (1995) and the Hungarian Corvin Chain (2018).

Ritoók died on 13 March 2026, at the age of 96.
