= Amelia Casadei =

Italian politician (1930–2026)

Member of the Chamber of Deputies
- In office 5 July 1976 – 19 June 1979
- Constituency: Verona

Personal details
- Born: 1 February 1930 Cesena, Italy
- Died: 14 March 2026 (aged 96) Ponte San Nicolò, Italy
- Party: DC
- Occupation: Clerk

Amelia Casadei (1 February 1930 – 14 March 2026) was an Italian politician. A member of Christian Democracy, she served in the Chamber of Deputies from 1976 to 1979 and the Regional Council of Veneto from 1985 until 1990.

Casadei died in Ponte San Nicolò on 14 March 2026, at the age of 96.
