= Moon Yong-joo =

South Korean politician (1933–2026)

- 문용주

Member of the National Assembly of South Korea
- In office 11 April 1981 – 12 May 1985

Personal details
- Born: 8 February 1933 Anak County, Korea, Japan
- Died: 10 March 2026 (aged 93)
- Party: DJP
- Education: Chung-Ang University (LLB, LLM)
- Occupation: Lawyer

Moon Yong-joo (Korean: 문용주; 8 February 1933 – 10 March 2026) was a South Korean politician. A member of the Democratic Justice Party, she served in the National Assembly from 1981 to 1985.

Moon died on 10 March 2026, at the age of 93.
