= Thomas Gentille =

American jewelry designer (1936–2026)

- Born: 1936; Mansfield, Ohio, U.S.
- Died: March 2026 (aged 89–90); Manhattan, New York City, U.S.
- Education: Cleveland Institute of Art
- Occupation: Jewelry designer

Thomas Gentille (1936–2026) was an American jewelry designer, "one of the most influential figures in contemporary art jewelry" according to JCK Magazine. His work was exhibited in museums internationally like the Victoria and Albert Museum, Die Neue Sammlung, the Museum of Art and Design. His work can be found in notable collections including The Metropolitan Museum of Art,; Cooper- Hewitt Museum, Museum of Arts and Design, The Montreal Museum of Fine Arts, The Museum of Fine Arts, Boston, The Museum of Fine Arts, Houston, The National Gallery of Victoria, the Philadelphia Museum of Art; Pinakothek der Moderne, and the Victoria and Albert Museum.
