= Andy Alaszewski =

British academic (1949–2026)

- Born: 25 April 1949; Lewisham, London, England
- Died: 15 March 2026 (aged 76); Ashford, Kent, England
- Citizenship: British
- Known for: Research in Social Sciences and Social Policy
- Spouse: Helen Alaszewski

Academic background
- Education: University of Cambridge

Academic work
- Discipline: Social Sciences
- Institutions: University of Kent

Andrzej Mark Alaszewski FRSA (Polish: Andrzej Marek Ałaszewski; 25 April 1949 – 15 March 2026) was a British academic who was Emeritus Professor of Health Studies at the University of Kent from 2010 until his death in 2026.

== Life and career ==
Andrzej Mark Alaszewski was born in Lewisham, London on 25 April 1949, to Mieczysław Ałaszewski and Danuta Ałaszewski (nee Piotrowicz), refugees from Nazi and Soviet invaded Poland. He completed his undergraduate (BA in Social Anthropology, 1972) and postgraduate studies (PhD in Social and Political Sciences 1981) at the University of Cambridge.

Alaszewski specialised in the study of health, risk and society and was the founding editor of the journal Health, Risk & Society.

Alaszewski died at William Harvey Hospital in Ashford, Kent, on 15 March 2026, at the age of 76.

== Bibliography ==
- Stuart Haywood and Andy Alaszewski (1980) Crisis in the Health Service: The Politics of Management Croom Helm ISBN 9781350135529
- Sam Ayer and Andy Alaszewski (1984) Community Care and the Mentally Handicapped: Services for Mothers and their Mentally Handicapped Children Croom Helm ISBN 978-0709951049
- Andy Alaszewski (1985) Institutional Care and the Mentally Handicapped: The Mental Handicap Hospital Routledge and Kegan Paul ISBN 0709905645
- Andy Alaszewski, Larry Harrison and Jill Manthorpe (eds.) (1988) Risk, Health and Welfare: Policies, Strategies and Practice Open University Press ISBN 0 335 19869 4
- Andy Alaszewski and Bie Nio Ong (eds.) (1990) Normalisation in Practice: Residential Care for Children with a Profound Mental Handicap Routledge ISBN 978-1-138-95128-0
- Katarzyna Tymowska, Andy Alaszewski and Vanessa Malin (eds.) (1996) System Umow w Opiec Zdrowotnej w Anglii i w Polsce Centrum Edukacji i Rozwoju Biznesu ISBN 83-86069-49-X
- Andy Alaszewski and Tom Horlick-Jones (2002) Risk and Health: Review of Current Research and Identification of Areas for Further Research CHSS ISBN 978-1-904236-01-6
- Andy Alaszewski (2002) Risk and Health: Review of Current Research and Identification of Areas for Further Research CHSS ISBN 978-1-904236-01-6
- Andy Alaszewski and Patrick Brown (2012) Making Health Policy: A Critical Introduction Polity Press ISBN 9780745641737
- Andy Alaszewski (2021) COVID-19 and Risk: Policy Making in a Global Pandemic. Rapid Response Polity Press ISBN 978-1-4473-6201-2
- Andy Alaszewski (2021) Managing Risk during the COVID-19 Pandemic, Global Policies, Narratives and Practices Polity Press ISBN 978-1447365259
