= Hans Wagner (politician) =

German-born Dutch politician (1963–2026)

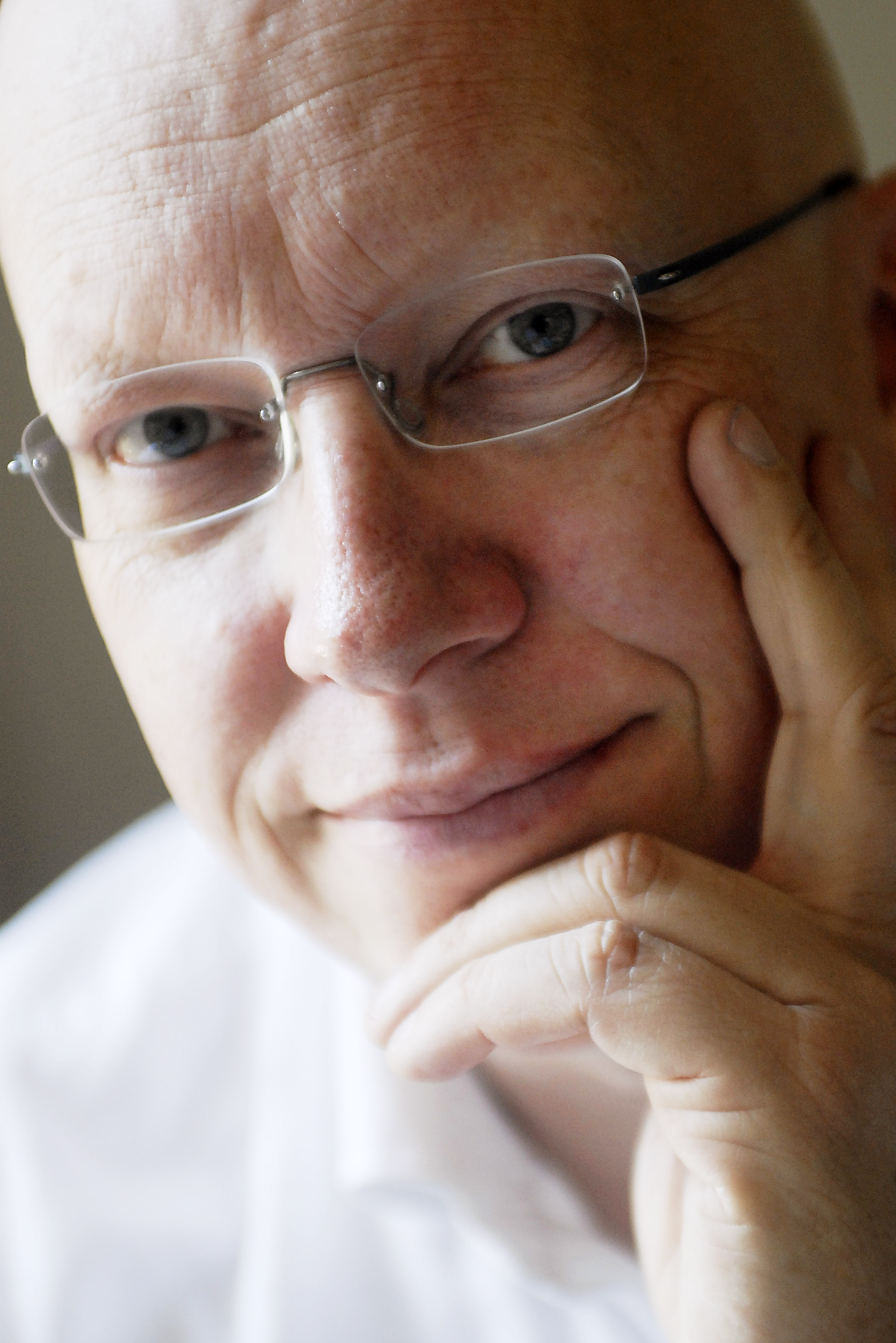

Member of the House of Representatives of the Netherlands
- In office 31 May 2006 – 29 November 2006

Personal details
- Born: 14 April 1963 Hamburg, West Germany
- Died: 6 March 2026 (aged 62)
- Party: PvdA
- Education: Katholieke Universiteit Nijmegen
- Occupation: Communications manager

Hans-Christoph Wagner (14 April 1963 – 6 March 2026) was a German-born Dutch politician. A member of the Labour Party, he served in the House of Representatives from May to November 2006.

Wagner died on 6 March 2026, at the age of 62.
