= Peter Schrag =

American journalist and author (1931–2026)

Peter Schrag (July 24, 1931 – March 19, 2026) was an American journalist and author. He was the editorial page editor of the Sacramento Bee from 1978 to 1997. Schrag died on March 19, 2026, at the age of 94.

== Books ==
- The Fires of Philadelphia: Citizen-Soldiers, Nativists, and the 1844 Riots Over the Soul of a Nation (Pegasus Books, 2021)
- California Fights Back: The Golden State in the Age of Trump (Heyday Books, 2018)
- Not Fit for Our Society: Immigration and Nativism in America (University of California Press, 2010)
- California: America's High-Stakes Experiment (University of California Press, 2006)
- Final Test: The Battle for Adequacy in America's Schools (The New Press, 2003)
- Paradise Lost: California's Experience, America's Future (The New Press, 1998)
- Mind Control (Pantheon Books, 1978)
- with Diane Divoky, The Myth of the Hyperactive Child: And Other Means of Child Control (Pantheon Books, 1975)
- Test of Loyalty: Daniel Ellsberg and the Rituals of Secret Government (Simon & Schuster, 1974)
- The Decline of the WASP (Simon & Schuster, 1970)
- Out of Place in America: Essays for the End of an Age (Random House, 1970)
- Village School Downtown: Boston Schools, Boston Politics (Beacon Press, 1967)
- Voices in the Classroom: Public Schools and Public Attitudes (Beacon Press, 1965)
