= Alessandro Finazzi Agrò =

Italian academic and biochemist (1941–2026)

- Born: 30 May 1941; Rome, Italy
- Died: 19 March 2026 (aged 84); Rome, Italy
- Education: University of Rome Tor Vergata
- Occupations: Academic, biochemist

Alessandro Finazzi Agrò (30 May 1941 – 19 March 2026) was an Italian academic and biochemist. He served as president of the University of Rome Tor Vergata from 1996 to 2008.

Finazzi Agrò died in Rome on 19 March 2026, at the age of 84.
