= Rolf Birkhölzer =

German footballer (1949–2026)

Personal information
- Date of birth: 29 September 1949
- Place of birth: Frankfurt, Hesse, West Germany
- Date of death: 6 March 2026 (aged 76)
- Place of death: Wetzlar, Hesse, Germany
- Height: 1.76 m (5 ft 9 in)
- Position: Goalkeeper

Senior career*
Years	Team	Apps	(Gls)
1968–1970	1. FC Köln	12	(0)
1970–1972	KSV Hessen Kassel		
- VfB Gießen
- TuSpo Ziegenhain

Managerial career
- 1982: FSV Frankfurt
- * Club domestic league appearances and goals

Rolf Birkhölzer (29 September 1949 – 6 March 2026) was a German professional footballer who played as a goalkeeper.

Birkhölzer started playing football at the age of nineteen for 1. FC Köln. He also played for KSV Hessen Kassel, VfB Gießen and TuSpo Ziegenhain in a playing career that lasted thirteen years and finished in 1981. He later became the coach of FSV Frankfurt, Schrecksbach, Bad Homburg and TuSpo Ziegenhain.

He played seven internationals for Germany's youth side.

Birkhölzer died at his home in Wetzlar, Germany, on 6 March 2026, at the age of 76.
