= Daniel Aweyue Syme =

Ghanaian politician (died 2026)

Hon. Daniel Aweyue Syme
- President: John Dramani Mahama

Personal details
- Born: Ghana
- Died: 16 March 2026
- Party: NDC

Daniel Aweyue Syme (died 16 March 2026) was a Ghanaian politician and the deputy Upper East Regional Minister of Ghana. Syme died on 16 March 2026.
