= Alistair Cochran =

Scottish-born American immunologist and pathologist

- Born: Alistair John Cochran; August 3, 1936; Glasgow, Scotland
- Died: March 9, 2026 (aged 89); Santa Monica, California, U.S.
- Education: University of Glasgow
- Occupations: Immunologist, pathologist
- Spouse: Janie Paterson Burnie (m. 1963; died. 2009)

Alistair John Cochran (August 3, 1936 – March 9, 2026) was a Scottish-born American immunologist and pathologist.

== Life and career ==
Cochran was born in Glasgow. He attended the University of Glasgow, earning his MB degree in 1959 and his MD degree in 1959. After graduating, he worked at the Western Infirmary, and emigrated to the United States.

Cochran served as a professor in the department of pathology and surgery at the University of California, Los Angeles from 1979 to 2016. During his years as a professor, he was named a distinguished professor.

== Personal life and death ==
In 1963, Cochran married Janie Paterson Burnie. Their marriage lasted until her death in 2009.

Cochran died at his home in Santa Monica, California on March 9, 2026, at the age of 89.
