= Xosé Antonio García Cotarelo =

Spanish lawyer and writer (1941–2026)

Xosé Antonio García Cotarelo (1941 – 21 March 2026), also known as Pepe de Regos, was a Spanish lawyer and writer.

== Life and career ==
García Cotarelo was born in Vilamea (A Pontenova) in 1941. He studied law in Madrid and passed the State Civil Service Technical Corps exams in 1967.

He worked as Deputy Director General in many ministries and also served as Secretary General for Technical Affairs and Institutional Relations of the Regional Ministry of the Presidency in 1986 and as the Secretary General of the Vice Presidency until he retired in 2007.

== Works ==
The Galician Autonomy (1846–1981), 1986 (with Rubén Víctor Lois Calviño and Xesús Fernández Jiménez). He also translated "Elegies of Tibulus", 1989.

== Death ==
García Cotarelo died on 21 March 2026, aged 84.
