= Waldyr Pugliesi =

Brazilian politician (1936–2026)

Member of the Chamber of Deputies of Brazil for Paraná
- In office 1 February 1987 – 31 December 1992

Member of the Brazilian Constituent Assembly
- In office 1 February 1987 – 22 July 1988

Member of the Legislative Assembly of Paraná
- In office 1 February 2007 – 31 January 2015
- In office 1 February 1999 – 31 January 2003
- In office 1 February 1979 – 31 January 1983

Personal details
- Born: Waldyr Ortêncio Pugliesi; 27 January 1936 Monte Alto, São Paulo, Brazil
- Died: 20 March 2026 (aged 90) Londrina, Paraná, Brazil
- Party: MDB
- Education: University of Uberaba
- Occupation: Dentist

Waldyr Ortêncio Pugliesi (27 January 1936 – 20 March 2026) was a Brazilian politician. A member of the Brazilian Democratic Movement, he served three non-consecutive terms in the Legislative Assembly of Paraná and was a member of the Chamber of Deputies from 1987 to 1992.

Pugliesi died in Londrina on 20 March 2026, at the age of 90.
