= Jerzy Józefiak =

Polish politician (1937–2026)

Member of the Sejm
- In office 18 June 1989 – 25 November 1991

Personal details
- Born: Jerzy Marian Józefiak; 1 December 1937 Bydgoszcz, Poland
- Died: 5 March 2026 (aged 88)
- Party: PUS
- Education: University of Agriculture and Technology in Olsztyn
- Occupation: Agricultural engineer

Jerzy Marian Józefiak (1 December 1937 – 5 March 2026) was a Polish politician. A member of the Polish Social Democratic Union, he served in the Sejm from 1989 to 1991.

Józefiak died on 5 March 2026, at the age of 88.
