= Alessandro Cortese de Bosis =

Italian diplomat and writer (1926–2026)

- Born: 23 April 1926; Rome, Italy
- Died: 15 March 2026 (aged 99); Ancona, Italy
- Occupations: Academic, diplomat, writer
- Spouse: Marina Bosis

Alessandro Cortese de Bosis (23 April 1926 – 15 March 2026) was an Italian academic, diplomat and writer. He served as president of the American University of Rome from 1993 to 1995.

De Bosis died on 15 March 2026 in Ancona, at the age of 99.
