= Anastasios Gonis =

Greek politician (1926–2026)

- Αναστάσιος Γκόνης

Member of the Hellenic Parliament
- In office 10 October 1993 – 24 August 1996

Personal details
- Born: 1926 Pylos-Nestoras, Greece
- Died: 12 March 2026 (aged 99–100) Athens, Greece
- Party: ND
- Education: Panteion University; National and Kapodistrian University of Athens
- Occupation: Jurist

Anastasios Gonis (Greek: Αναστάσιος Γκόνης; 1926 – 12 March 2026) was a Greek politician. A member of New Democracy, he served in the Hellenic Parliament from 1993 to 1996.

Gonis died in Athens on 12 March 2026.
