= Jean Delas =

French publisher (1939–2026)

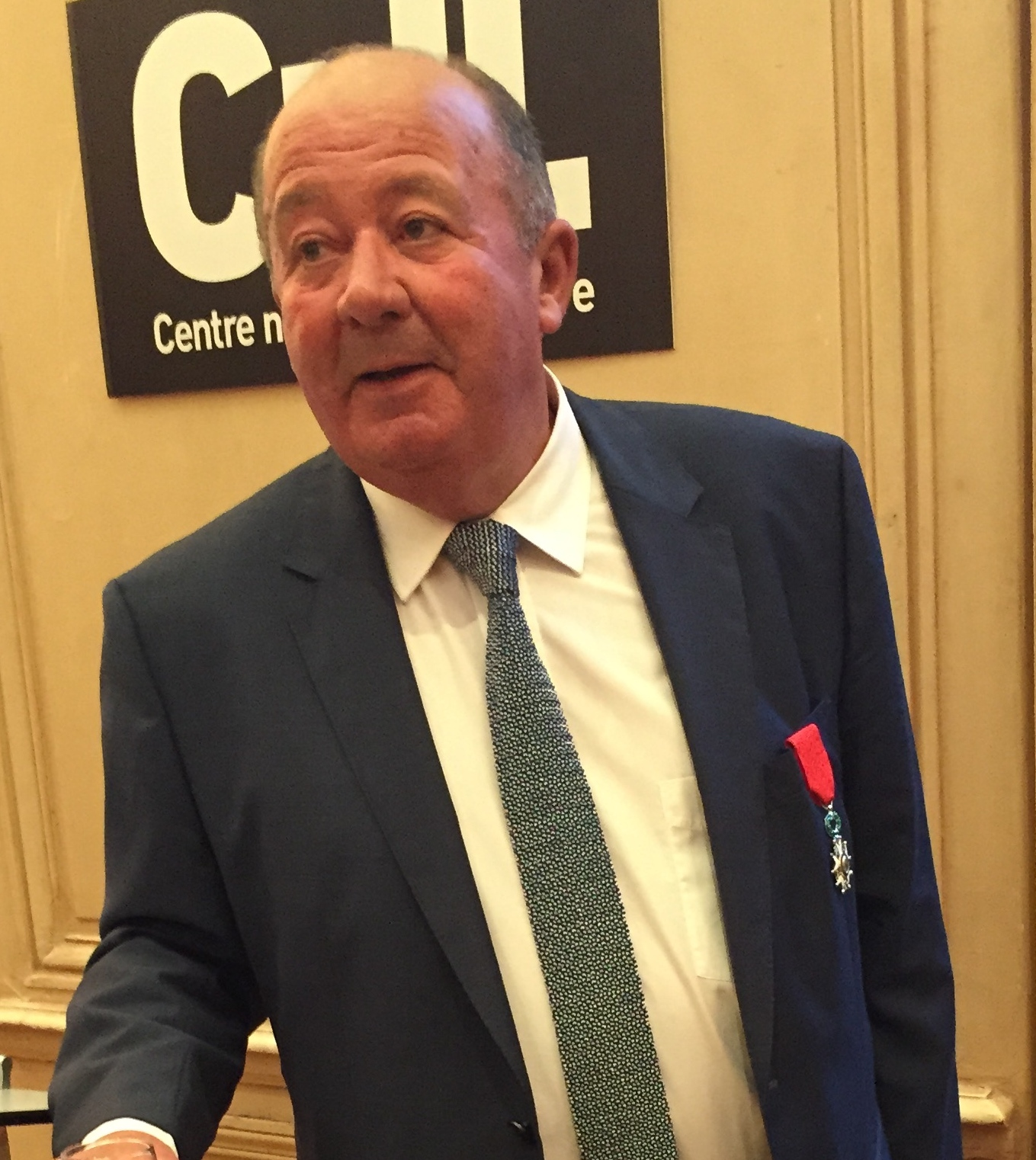
- Delas in 2015
- Born: 31 August 1939
- Died: 16 March 2026 (aged 86)
- Occupation: Publisher

Jean Delas (31 August 1939 – 16 March 2026) was a French publisher. He was a recipient of the Legion of Honour (2015).

Delas died on 16 March 2026, at the age of 86.
