= Ernő Mészáros =

Hungarian air chemist and meteorologist (1935–2026)

- Born: 12 April 1935; Budapest, Hungary
- Died: 16 March 2026 (aged 90)
- Education: Eötvös Loránd University
- Occupations: Air chemist; meteorologist

Ernő Mészáros (12 April 1935 – 16 March 2026) was a Hungarian air chemist and meteorologist. A member of the Hungarian Academy of Sciences, he was a recipient of the Hungarian Middle Cross of Merit (2005).

Mészáros died on 16 March 2026, at the age of 90.
