= László Kordos =

Hungarian geologist and palaeontologist (1950–2026)

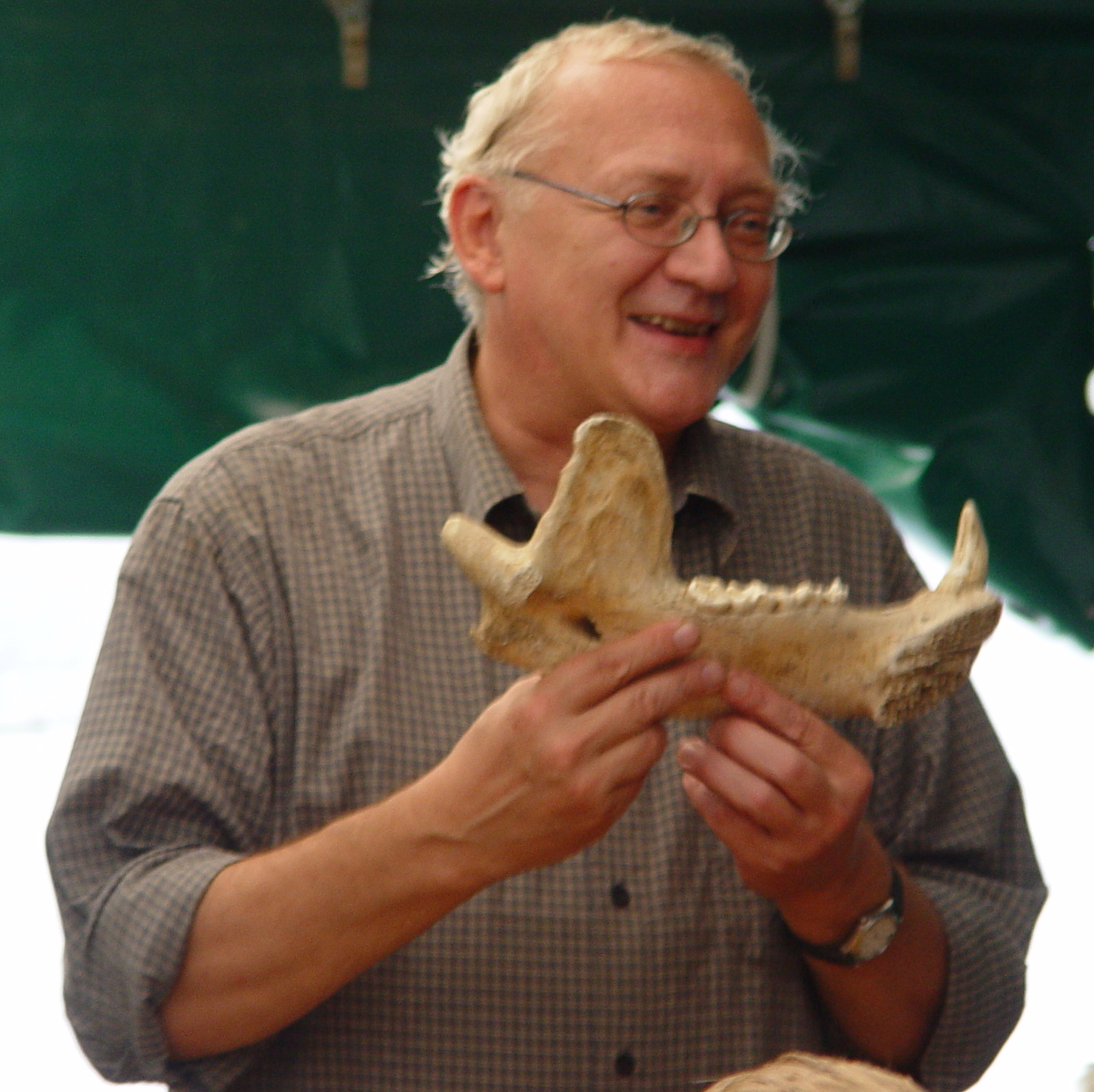
- Kordos in 2005
- Born: 23 May 1950; Mezőcsát, Hungary
- Died: 26 March 2026 (aged 75)
- Education: University of Debrecen
- Occupations: Geologist, paleontologist

László Kordos (23 May 1950 – 26 March 2026) was a Hungarian geologist and palaeontologist. He was a recipient of the Hungarian Knight Cross of Merit (2014).

Kordos died on 26 March 2026, at the age of 75.
