= Abdikalyk Akmatov =

Kyrgyz actor (1955–2026)

Abdykalyk Akmatov
- Абдыкалык Акматов
- Born: 1955
- Died: 25 March 2026 (aged 70–71)

Abdykalyk Akmatov (Kyrgyz: Абдыкалык Акматов; 1955 – 25 March 2026) was a Kyrgyz actor and theatre personality.

== Life and career ==
Akmatov was born in Ak-Bulak in the Nookat district of the Osh region in 1955. He was a member of the Union of Theater Workers and the Union of Cinematographers of the Kyrgyz Republic.

He started his career as a lighting technician in 1975 at Osh Regional Drama Theater. He completed his graduation in acting at All-Union State Institute of Cinematography in Moscow in 1978.

Akmatov performed popular roles as Toktogul Satylganov in Kerbez, Koozhozhash's friend in Descendant of the White Leopard, and Dooolos in the film Our Paths Crossed.

He was conferred with the honorary title, People's Artist by the president Sadyr Japarov for his contribution to the country's cultural development.

Akmatov died on 25 March 2026, at the age of 71.
