= Tuning Fork (film) =

- Written by: Leonid Braslavsky
- Directed by: Willen Novak
- Starring: Andrey Evgenievih Tashkov
- Music by: Alexander Gradsky
- Country of origin: Soviet Union
- Original language: Russian

Original release
- Release: 1979

Tuning Fork is a 1979 Soviet two-part television feature film. The film uses drawings by Nadya Rusheva. Alexander Gradsky appears in the film as himself. The song from the film 'Baby', performed by Gradsky, became popular for playing in the yards with a guitar.

== Plot ==
The characters in the film are ninth-grade students. The film tells about the problems of raising teenagers in the family and in school; assessment by teachers of students as individuals; rivalry in the class for leadership; purity and morality of people. The film also touches on the complexity of growing up and first love.

== Cast ==
- Elena Shanina - Claudia Sergeevna, class teacher
- Boris Saburov - Grigory Sidorovich, teacher
- Andrey Tashkov - Lyosha Kuzmin
- Irina Korytnikova - Tanya Sevastyanova, headman
- Vasily Funtikov - Sasha Ganushkin
- Anna Nadtochiy - Vera Mikhailova (voiced by Natalya Rychagova )
- Artur Sirotinsky - Petya Yankovsky
- Polina Kachura - Lara Belykh
- Evgeny Ivanychev as Fedor Petrovich, Lara's father
- Sergei Sazontiev - Yuri Vasilyevich Reshetnikov, director of the film studio
- Luciena Ovchinnikova as Maria Fedorovna, Galushkin's mother
- G. Potykalov - Kolya Kuskov
- Alexander Gradsky - cameo

== Awards ==
X-th film festival 'Youth' (1979) - Prize of the magazine 'News of the cinema screens' went to the actor A. Tashkov.

== Other sources ==
- Tuning fork // Television feature films for children and fairy tale films: an annotated catalogue. - M .: Gosteleradiofond, 2002. - 231 p. - page 62
- Tuning fork // Mastery in the film: Sat. articles about Ukrainian cinema in 1976-1980. / Comp. A. I. Shcherbak. - Kiev: Mystetstvo, 1982. - 247 p. - page 234
