= Della Hadley =

American politician (1929–2026)

Member of the Missouri House of Representatives from the 31st district
- In office Jan. 1975 – Jan. 1981

Personal details
- Born: January 27, 1929 Lawrence, Kansas, U.S.
- Died: March 18, 2026 (aged 97) Lawrence, Kansas, U.S.
- Party: Democratic
- Spouse: Stephen D. Hadley (m. 1948)
- Children: 4 (2 daughters, 2 sons)
- Occupation: Politician

Della May Hadley (January 27, 1929 – March 18, 2026) was an American politician who served as a Missouri state representative.

== Life and career ==
Hadley was born in Lawrence, Kansas, on January 27, 1929. She was educated at Lawrence public schools, the University of Kansas, and Purdue University, earning a degree in Political Science.

She was elected to the Kansas City School Board in 1970. As a member, she was the lead plaintiff in Hadley v. Junior College District of Metropolitan Kansas City, 397 U.S. 50 (1970), a one-man-one-vote case that was taken to the Supreme Court of the United States.

In 1974, 1976 and 1978, she was elected to the Missouri House of Representatives, serving 6 years total. One of her goals was to get Missouri to ratify the Equal Rights Amendment to the U.S. Constitution.

In 1948, she married Stephen D. Hadley in Lawrence, Kansas, with whom she had four children. They lived in Kansas City, Missouri from 1951 until 1984, when they moved back to the Lawrence area. Stephen Hadley, a mechanical engineer and a European theater World War II Army veteran, died in Lawrence on February 22, 1990. Della Hadley died in Lawrence on March 18, 2026, at the age of 97.
