= Alfonso Cavaliere =

Italian astrophysicist and cosmologist (1933–2026)

- Cavaliere in 2003
- Born: Alfonso Giuseppe Cavaliere; 27 August 1933; Crotone, Italy
- Died: 28 March 2026 (aged 92); Rome, Italy
- Education: Sapienza University of Rome
- Occupations: Astrophysicist; cosmologist

Alfonso Giuseppe Cavaliere (27 August 1933 – 28 March 2026) was an Italian astrophysicist and cosmologst. A member of the Academia Europaea, he was a recipient of the Linceo Prize for Astronomy (1983).

Cavaliere died in Rome on 28 March 2026, at the age of 92.
