= Raivo Mänd =

Estonian ecologist and zoologist (1954–2026)

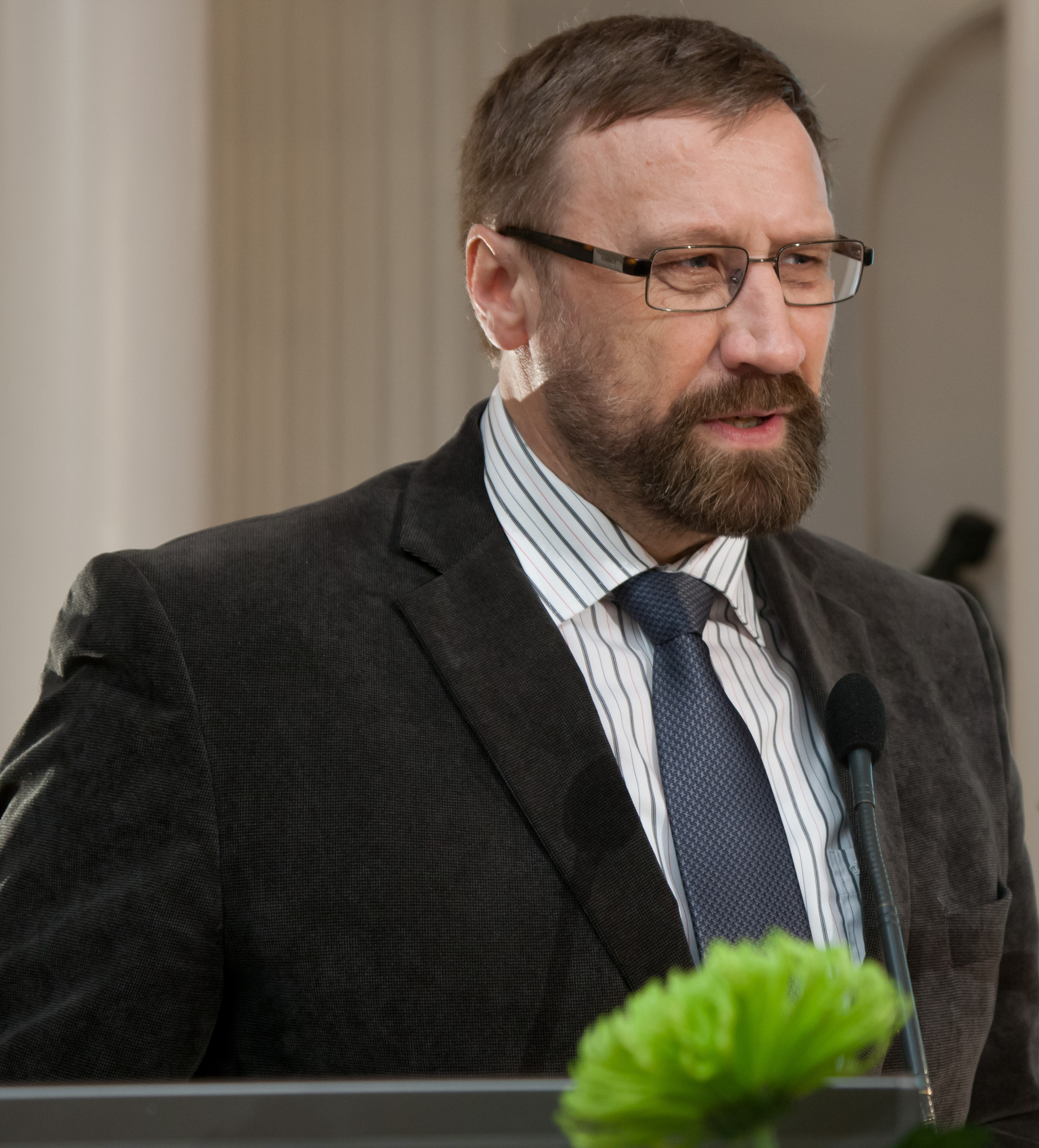
- Mänd in 2012
- Born: 2 December 1954; Saaremaa Parish, Estonia
- Died: 20 March 2026 (aged 71)
- Education: University of Tartu
- Occupations: Ecologist, zoologist

Raivo Mänd (2 December 1954 – 20 March 2026) was an Estonian ecologist and zoologist. He was a recipient of the Order of the White Star (2025).

Mänd died on 20 March 2026, at the age of 71.
