= Pasquale Fiore =

Italian footballer (1953–2026)

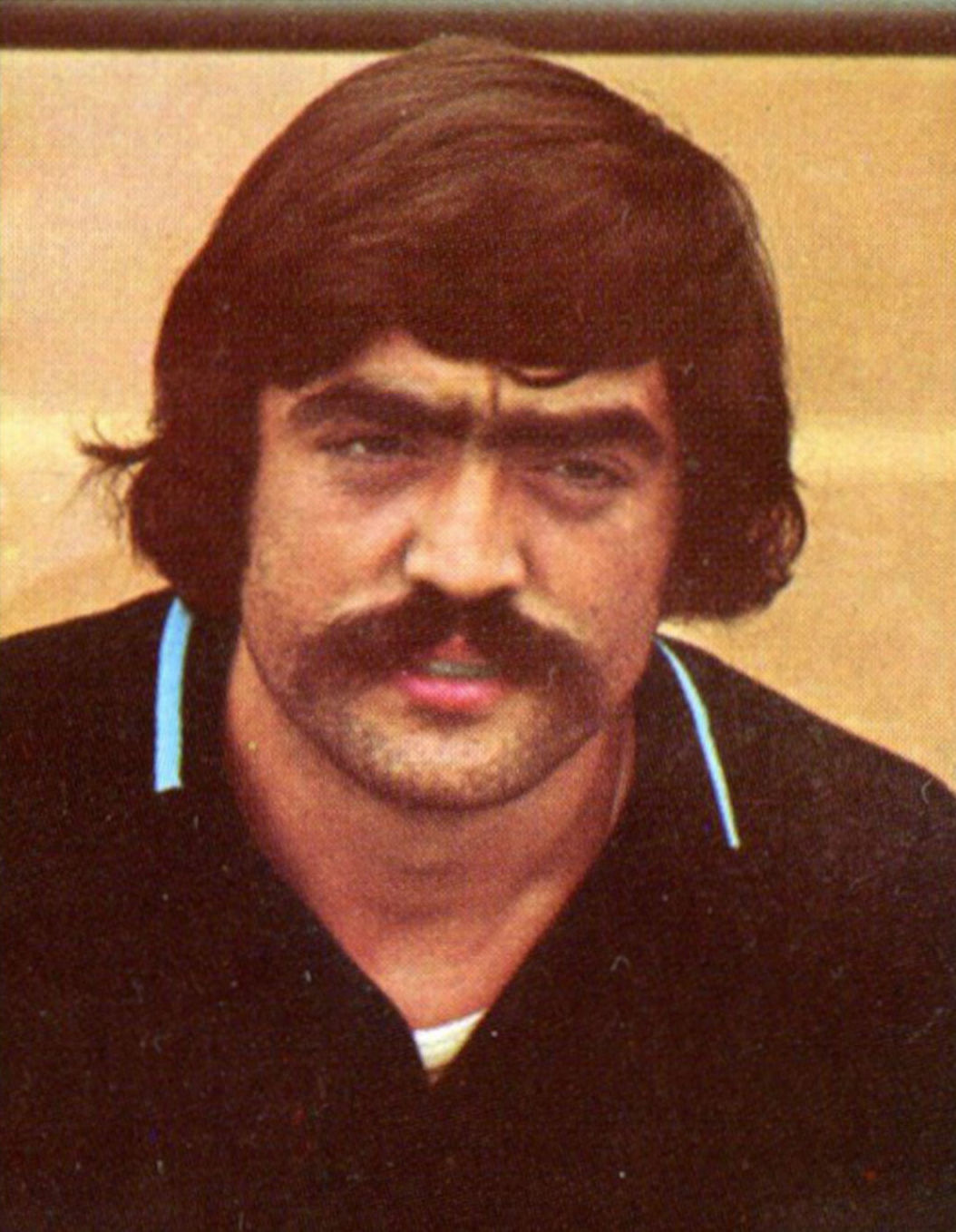
Fiore with Napoli in 1975

Pasquale Fiore (9 December 1953 – 6 March 2026) was an Italian footballer. He was the second goalkeeper of Napoli from 1977 to 1984.

== Biography ==
Fiore played 13 matches in six seasons and was part of the team that won two trophies. He was the deputy of Luciano Castellini. In 1975, he was part of the Primavera team coached by Rosario Rivellino which won the Viareggio International Tournament. He later worked at Heliconia Park.

Fiore died on 6 March 2026, at the age of 72.
