= Arnaud Nguefack =

Cameroonian journalist (1987–2026)

- Born: 24 August 1987
- Died: 1 March 2026 (aged 38); Yaoundé, Cameroon
- Occupation: Journalist

Arnaud Nguefack (24 August 1987 – 1 March 2026) was a Cameroonian journalist.

Nguefack was best known for his work on Canal 2 International, covering Cameroonian news and conducting investigative reports.

Nguefack died in Yaoundé on 1 March 2026, at the age of 38.
