= Federico Enriques =

Italian publisher and politician (1941–2026)

Federico Enriques (1941 – 31 March 2026) was an Italian publisher and politician. He was a senator from 2006 to 2008. Enriques died on 31 March 2026, at the age of 84.
