= Peter Messent =

English literary scholar (1946/1947–2026)

- Born: 1946 or 1947; Wimbledon, England
- Died: March 2026 (aged 79)
- Education: University of Manchester (B.A., 1969) (MPhil, 1971)
- Occupation: Academic
- Years active: 1971–2011
- Spouse(s): Brenda Courcha (m. 1971; div. 1987) Carin Davis (m. 1994; died 2023)
- Children: 2

Peter B. Messent (1946 or 1947 – March 2026) was a British academic who was a distinguished professor of American Studies at the University of Nottingham, and the author of several books of literary studies about Mark Twain.

== Early life and education ==
Messent was born in Wimbledon, London, the son of Rosa (née Burger) and John Messent, then the deputy clerk of the Metropolitan Water Board. He had three siblings.

After attending Wimbledon College, he gained a Bachelor of Arts degree in American Studies (1969) from the University of Manchester, followed by a Master of Philosophy degree on humour in American fiction (1971).

== Career ==
After lecturing at Manchester for a year, Messent accepted a position at the University of Nottingham, teaching American literature. He spent a year (from August 1977–August 1978) lecturing as a Fulbright scholar at California State University in Sacramento, California, hosted by Vernon T. Hornback Jr. Becoming a full professor in 1999 and later serving as head of the department of American and Canadian studies, and distinguished professor, Messent remained at Nottingham until his retirement in September 2011.

== Personal life and death ==
Messent married Brenda Courcha in 1971, with whom he had two children. They divorced in 1987. He later married Carin Davis in 1994, who died in 2023.

Messent died in March 2026, at the age of 79.

== Selected works ==
A full bibliography can be found here:

- Messent, Peter (1990). New Readings of the American Novel: Narrative Theory and its Applications. Palgrave Macmillan. ISBN 978-0333437964.
- Messent, Peter (1992). Ernest Hemingway. Palgrave Macmillan. ISBN 978-0333519202.
- Messent, Peter, ed. (1997). Criminal Proceedings: the Contemporary American Crime Novel. Pluto Press. ISBN 978-0745310169.
- Messent, Peter (2001). The Short Works of Mark Twain: A Critical Study. Philadelphia, Pennsylvania: University of Pennsylvania Press. ISBN 9780812236224.
- Peter, Messent; Budd, Louis J. (2005). A Companion to Mark Twain – Blackwell Companions to Literature and Culture. Blackwell Publishing. ISBN 9781119045397.
- Messent, Peter (2007). The Cambridge Companion to Mark Twain. Cambridge, U.K.: Cambridge University Press. ISBN 9780521854450.
- Messent, Peter (2009). Mark Twain and Male Friendship: The Twichell, Howells, And Rogers Friendships. New York: Oxford University Press. ISBN 9780199964109.
- Messent, Peter (2012). The Cambridge Introduction to Mark Twain. Cambridge University Press. ISBN 9780511610974.
- Messent, Peter (2012). The Crime Fiction Handbook. Hoboken, New Jersey: Wiley-Blackwell. ISBN 9780470657041.

== Awards ==
- His 2009 work Mark Twain and Male Friendship won the EAAS American Studies Network Book Prize and the British Association for American Studies (BAAS) Annual Book Prize.
