= Mouta Penda =

Cameroonian comedian (died 2026)

- Died: 4 March 2026
- Occupation: Comedian

Mouta Penda (died 4 March 2026) was a Cameroonian comedian.

Penda was primarily known for uploading videos of his comedy sketches to social media and appeared in online productions such as Le Piège de Mouta Penda and Vengeance feat Mouta Penda. He was in a popular comedy trio with Fingon Tralala and Black Oya.

Penda died following a long illness on 4 March 2026.
