= Péter Halász (agricultural engineer) =

Hungarian agricultural engineer and ethnographer (1939–2026)

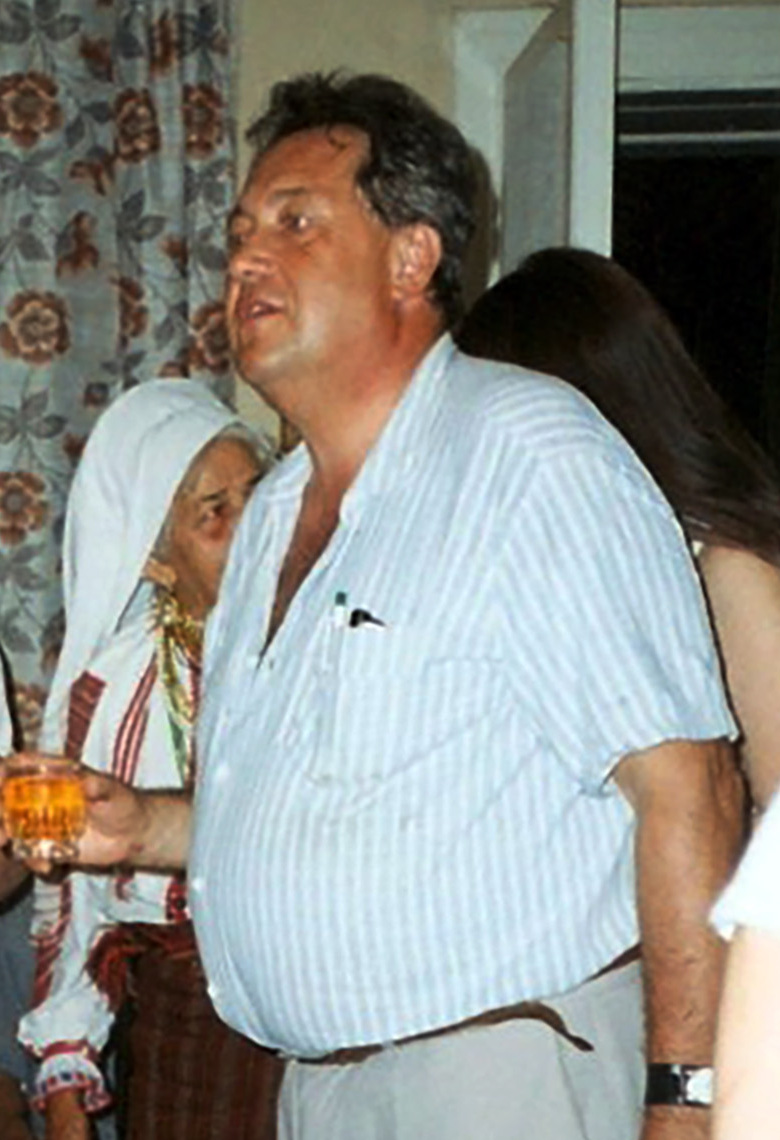
- Halász in 2019
- Born: 28 October 1939; Budapest, Hungary
- Died: 19 March 2026 (aged 86)
- Occupations: Agricultural engineer, ethnographer

Péter Halász (28 October 1939 – 19 March 2026) was a Hungarian agricultural engineer and ethnographer. He was a recipient of the Hungarian Knight Cross of Merit (2018).

Halász died on 19 March 2026, at the age of 86.
