= Jakub Derech-Krzycki =

Polish politician (1970–2026)

Member of the Sejm
- In office 2001–2005

Personal details
- Born: 24 June 1970 Poznań, Poland
- Died: 17 March 2026 (aged 55)
- Party: SdRP; SLD

Jakub Derech-Krzycki (24 June 1970 – 17 March 2026) was a Polish politician. A member of the Social Democracy of the Republic of Poland and the Democratic Left Alliance, he served in the Sejm from 2001 to 2005.

Derech-Krzycki died on 17 March 2026, at the age of 55.
