= 2026 in Russia =

- Decades: 2000s; 2010s; 2020s
- See also: History of Russia; Timeline of Russian history; List of years in Russia

Events in the year 2026 in Russia.

== Incumbents ==
- President: Vladimir Putin
- Prime Minister: Mikhail Mishustin

=== Governors ===
- Amur Oblast: Vasily Orlov (ER)
- Arkhangelsk Oblast: Alexander Tsybulsky (ER)
- Astrakhan Oblast: Igor Babushkin (ER)
- Belgorod Oblast: Vyacheslav Gladkov (until 13 May, ER), Alexander Shuvaev (Acting, ER, starting 13 May)
- Bryansk Oblast: Alexander Bogomaz (until 13 May, ER), Yegor Kovalchuk (Acting, ER, starting 13 May)
- Chelyabinsk Oblast: Aleksey Teksler (ER)
- Irkutsk Oblast: Igor Kobzev (ER)
- Ivanovo Oblast: Stanislav Voskresensky (ER)
- Kaliningrad Oblast: Alexey Besprozvannykh (ER)
- Kaluga Oblast: Vladislav Shapsha (ER)
- Kemerovo Oblast: Ilya Seredyuk (ER)
- Kirov Oblast: Alexander Sokolov (ER)
- Kostroma Oblast: Sergey Sitnikov (ER)
- Kurgan Oblast: Vadim Shumkov (ER)
- Kursk Oblast: Alexander Khinshtein (ER)
- Leningrad Oblast: Aleksandr Drozdenko (ER)
- Lipetsk Oblast: Igor Artamonov (ER)
- Magadan Oblast: Sergey Nosov (ER)
- Moscow Oblast: Andrey Vorobyov (ER)
- Murmansk Oblast: Andrey Chibis (ER)
- Nizhny Novgorod Oblast: Gleb Nikitin (ER)
- Novgorod Oblast: Andrey Nikitin (ER)
- Novosibirsk Oblast: Andrey Travnikov (ER)
- Omsk Oblast: Vitaliy Khotsenko (ER)
- Orenburg Oblast: Denis Pasler (ER)
- Oryol Oblast: Andrey Klychkov (CPRF)
- Penza Oblast: Oleg Melnichenko (ER)
- Pskov Oblast: Mikhail Vedernikov (ER)
- Rostov Oblast: Yury Slyusar (ER)
- Ryazan Oblast: Pavel Malkov (ER)
- Sakhalin Oblast: Valery Limarenko (ER)
- Samara Oblast: Vyacheslav Fedorishchev (ER)
- Saratov Oblast: Roman Busargin (ER)
- Smolensk Oblast: Vasily Anokhin (ER)
- Tambov Oblast: Yevgeny Pervyshov (ER)
- Tomsk Oblast: Vladimir Mazur (ER)
- Tula Oblast: Dmitry Milyaev (ER)
- Tver Oblast: Igor Rudenya (ER)
- Tyumen Oblast: Aleksandr Moor (ER)
- Ulyanovsk Oblast: Aleksey Russkikh (CPRF)
- Vladimir Oblast: Alexander Avdeyev (ER)
- Volgograd Oblast: Andrey Bocharov (ER)
- Vologda Oblast: Georgy Filimonov (ER)
- Voronezh Oblast: Alexander Gusev (ER)
- Yaroslavl Oblast: Mikhail Yevrayev (ER)
- Jewish Autonomous Oblast: Maria Kostyuk (ER)

== Ongoing ==
- Russo-Ukrainian War (2014–present)
  - Russian invasion of Ukraine (2022–present)

== Events ==
=== January ===
- 5 January – Three people are injured in a polar bear attack in Nosok, Krasnoyarsk Krai.
- 8 January – Laurent Vinatier, a French researcher imprisoned in Russia since 2024 on charges of failing to register as a "foreign agent", is released in a prisoner swap in exchange for Russian basketball player Daniil Kasatkin, who had been detained in France since 2025 on suspicion of involvement in cyberhacking.
- 13 January – Russia expels a British diplomat after accusing him of spying.
- 14 January – Two senior doctors are arrested over the suspicious deaths of nine newborn infants at a maternity hospital in Novokuznetsk from 4 to 12 January.
- 15 January –
  - One person is killed while 17 others are injured in an explosion at a police training center in Syktyvkar.
  - Two people are killed after being buried by falling snow piles from buildings in Petropavlovsk-Kamchatsky.
- 19 January – A court in Sochi sentences an American citizen to five years' imprisonment on charges of illegally transporting weapons after being found with a rifle aboard his yacht in June 2025.
- 21 January – The Second Western District Military Court in Moscow sentences Uzbek national Akhmadzhon Kurbonov to life imprisonment for the assassination of Lieutenant General Igor Kirillov in 2024.
- 22 January – The FSB arrests a Russian national on suspicion of spying for Moldova.
- 25 January – A state of emergency is declared in Murmansk Oblast due to power outages caused by heavy snowstorms.
- 28 January –
  - The Shiveluch volcano in Kamchatka erupts.
  - Alexander Vainberg resigns from the Federation Council to undertake military service in Ukraine.

=== February ===
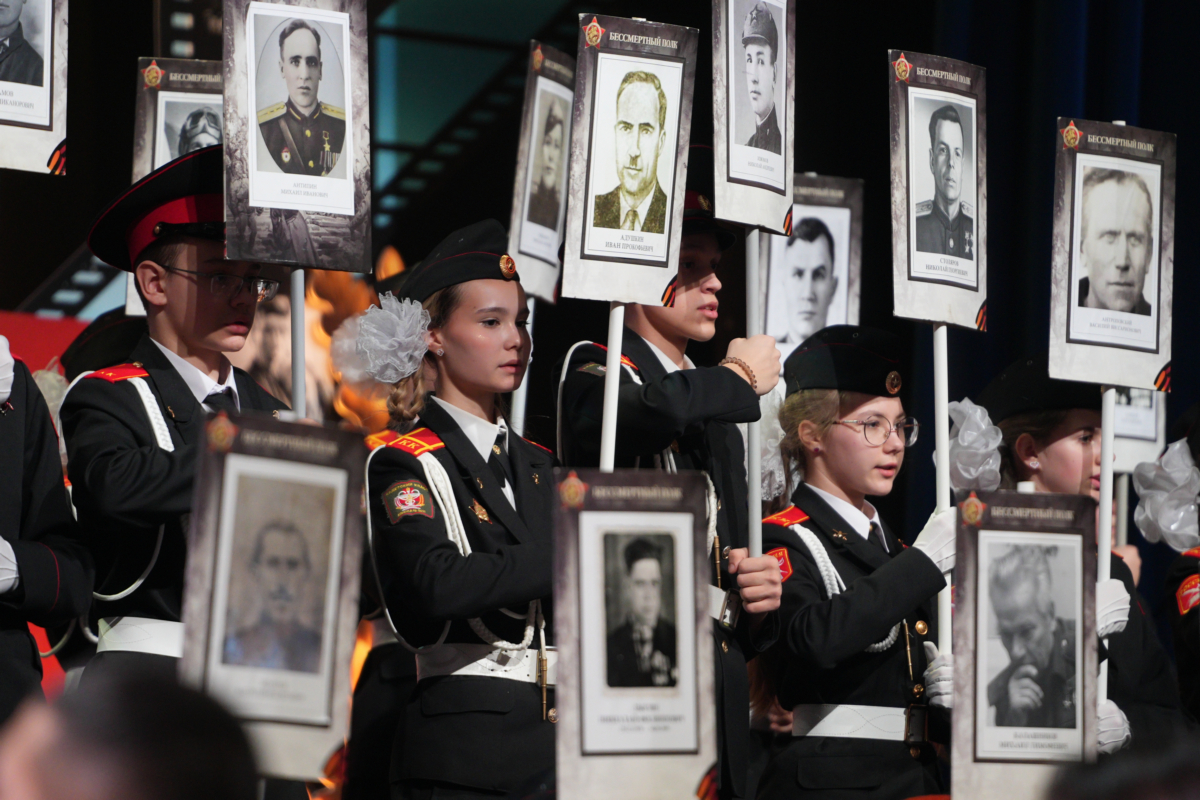
Jubilee concert celebrating the 55th anniversary of the Soviet film Officers at the State Kremlin Palace, February 2026

- 2 February – A bus collides with a truck in Krasnoyarsk, killing five people and injuring six others.
- 3 February – Myanmar and Russia sign a five-year military cooperation agreement.
- 4 February – Six people are injured in a combined arson and hammer attack by a student inside a school in Krasnoyarsk Krai.
- 5 February – Russia expels a German diplomat in retaliation for the expulsion of a Russian diplomat by Germany for spying in January.
- 6 February – Lieutenant General Vladimir Alekseyev, the deputy head of the GRU, is shot and severely injured by an unidentified gunman in Moscow.
- 7 February – Four Indian students are injured in a knife attack at the dormitory of the Bashkir State Medical University in Ufa.
- 10 February – Roskomnadzor announces phased restrictions on Telegram on charges of violating laws requiring data on Russian users to be stored inside the country and the removal of usage for "criminal and terrorist purposes".
- 11 February –
  - One person is killed in a shooting at a technical college in Anapa, Krasnodar Krai.
  - President Putin issues a decree establishing a general staff for the National Guard of Russia.
- 12 February –
  - The government blocks access to WhatsApp in Russia on charges of violating domestic laws.
  - The deputy governor of Chelyabinsk Oblast, Andrei Faleychik, is arrested on suspicion of bribery.
- 17 February –
  - The International Paralympic Committee allows Russian paralympians to compete under their national flag for the first time since the start of the Russo-Ukrainian war in 2022.
  - Three people are killed in an explosion at a military police facility in Sertolovo, Leningrad Oblast.
- 19 February – Amina Shafikova, the culture minister of Bashkortostan, is arrested on suspicion of corruption.
- 20 February – A tour bus carrying Chinese nationals falls through an ice crevasse along Lake Baikal, killing eight people.
- 23 February – Hungary and Slovakia block the European Union's 20th sanctions package against Russia, preventing its adoption ahead of the fourth anniversary of the full-scale invasion of Ukraine.
- 24 February – A police officer and a bomber are killed in a bomb attack near Moscow Savyolovsky railway station.
- 27 February – Alexei Botvin, the mayor of Bodaybo, Irkutsk Oblast is arrested on charges of abuse of power over the neglect of the town's heating and water facilities.

=== March ===
- 1 March – Police in Moscow detain Iranian nationals who celebrated the killing of Supreme Leader Ali Khamenei in public.
- 3 March – A court in Saint Petersburg designates the LGBT rights group Coming Out an "extremist organization".
- 4 March – Russia releases two dual Hungarian-Ukrainian nationals who had been captured while fighting for Ukraine following negotiations between president Putin and Hungarian foreign minister Péter Szijjártó.
- 5 March – Former deputy defense minister Ruslan Tsalikov is arrested on charges of corruption.
- 6–15 March – The 2026 Winter Paralympics in Italy sees Russian athletes compete under the Russian flag for the first time in an Olympic-level event since 2014.
- 9 March – President Putin signs a law prohibiting the extradition of foreign nationals and stateless persons who had undegone combat experience while serving in the Russian military.
- 12 March – The Second Western District Military Court in Moscow sentences 19 people to sentences ranging up to life imprisonment for their role in carrying out the Crocus City Hall attack in 2024.
- 13 March –
  - The Justice Ministry designates Nina Khrushcheva, the great-granddaughter of Soviet leader Nikita Khrushchev, as a "foreign agent".
  - The United States imposes a month-long suspension on sanctions against Russian oil that is currently in transit amid an increase in oil prices caused by the 2026 Iran war.
- 15 March – Mr Nobody Against Putin, a Netflix documentary on the Russo-Ukrainian war directed by Pavel Talankin, wins the Academy Award for Best Documentary Feature Film at the 2026 Oscars.
- 17 March –
  - Yevgeny Filippov, the health minister of Krasnodar Krai, is arrested on charges of fraud and abuse of power.
  - Ilya Remeslo, a prominent pro-Kremlin blogger, publishes a post on his Telegram channel, where he openly denounces Putin and the Russo-Ukrainian war, causing confusion and shock among audience. A day later, it is announced that he has been placed in a psychiatric hospital in Saint Petersburg.
- 18 March –
  - A court in Poland approves the extradition of Russian archaeologist Alexander Butyagin to Ukraine, where he is wanted on charges of damaging the Myrmēkion site in Russian-occupied Crimea.
  - MP Andrey Svintsov is expelled from the LDPR over his comments on internet restrictions in Russia.
- 20 March – The United States lifts sanctions on several Russian nationals and entities imposed in 2023 for helping evade sanctions on Russia.
- 26 March – 2026 Chelyabinsk school attack: Several people are injured in a school attack in Chelyabinsk, Chelyabinsk Oblast.
- 27 March – Russia designates filmmaker and teacher Pavel Talankin, the co-director and subject of the 2025 documentary film Mr Nobody Against Putin, as a foreign agent after authorities accuse him of spreading disinformation about the government and opposing the war in Ukraine.
- 30 March – Russia expels a British diplomat after accusing him of spying.
- 31 March –
  - Three people are killed in an explosion at the Nizhnekamskneftekhim petrochemical plant in Nizhnekamsk, Tatarstan.
  - An Antonov An-26 transport aircraft of the Russian Air Force crashes into a cliff in Crimea, killing all 30 on board.
  - Russia designates Tufts University and the Fletcher School of Law and Diplomacy as "undesirable organizations".

=== April ===
- 3 April –
  - At least 35 people are injured after a passenger train derails near Bryandino, Ulyanovsk Oblast.
  - An Su-30 fighter aircraft of the Russian Air Force crashes during a training flight in Crimea. Both crew are rescued.
- 4 April – Russia evacuates 198 more staff from Iran's Bushehr Nuclear Power Plant as an airstrike kills an Iranian security guard at the plant.
- 6 April –
  - Five people are killed in flashfloods and landslides in Dagestan.
  - Former Kursk Oblast governor Alexei Smirnov is sentenced to 14 years' imprisonment for embezzling public funds.
- 7 April –
  - A 17-year-old student fatally stabs his teacher at a school in Dobryanka, Perm Krai.
  - Russia and China veto a United Nations Security Council resolution calling on states to "coordinate efforts, defensive in nature" to ensure the safety of navigation in the Strait of Hormuz, saying that it was biased against Iran. The U.S. and France condemn the veto.
  - Andrei Korobka, the vice governor of Krasnodar Krai, is arrested on charges of corruption.
- 9 April – The Supreme Court of Russia designates the human rights group Memorial as an "extremist" organization.
- 10 April –
  - Russia designates Stanford University as an "undesirable" organization.
  - A court-martial sentences former deputy defense minister Pavel Popov to 19 years' imprisonment for corruption.
  - Two people are killed in an explosion at a fireworks warehouse in Vladikavkaz.
- 13 April –
  - World Aquatics lifts a ban on Russian and Belarusian athletes competing under the national flags that was imposed since the start of the Russo-Ukrainian war.
  - A court in Moscow sentences former senator Dmitry Savelyev to 10 years' imprisonment for conspiring to kill a business partner.
- 15 April – Russia agrees to provide compensation over its shooting down of Azerbaijan Airlines Flight 8243 in 2024 following negotiations with Azerbaijan.
- 17 April – After spending 30 days in the psychiatric hospital following his anti-Putin statements, Ilya Remeslo is released.
- 17 April – A new atlas of the Russian sector of the Arctic (the Chukchi Peninsula and the Koryak Highlands) is published.
- 20 April –
  - Andrei Shindelov is dismissed as agriculture minister of Novosibirsk Oblast following protests over the mass culling of cattle in the region blamed on an outbreak of rabies and pasteurellosis.
  - Three members of a hiking team are found dead in a suspected fall on Mönkh Saridag in Buryatia.
- 22 April – The US extends sanctions relief on Russian oil for another 30 days.
- 27 April – Three people die in a snowstorm in Samara.
- 28 April –
  - Alexander Butyagin is released in Belarus following a prisoner exchange with Poland.
  - Ufa mayor Ratmir Mavliyev is arrested on charges of corruption.
  - Seven people are killed in a fire at a construction site in Moscow.
- 30 April – Eight people are killed in a collapse at a coal mine in Magadan Oblast.

=== May ===
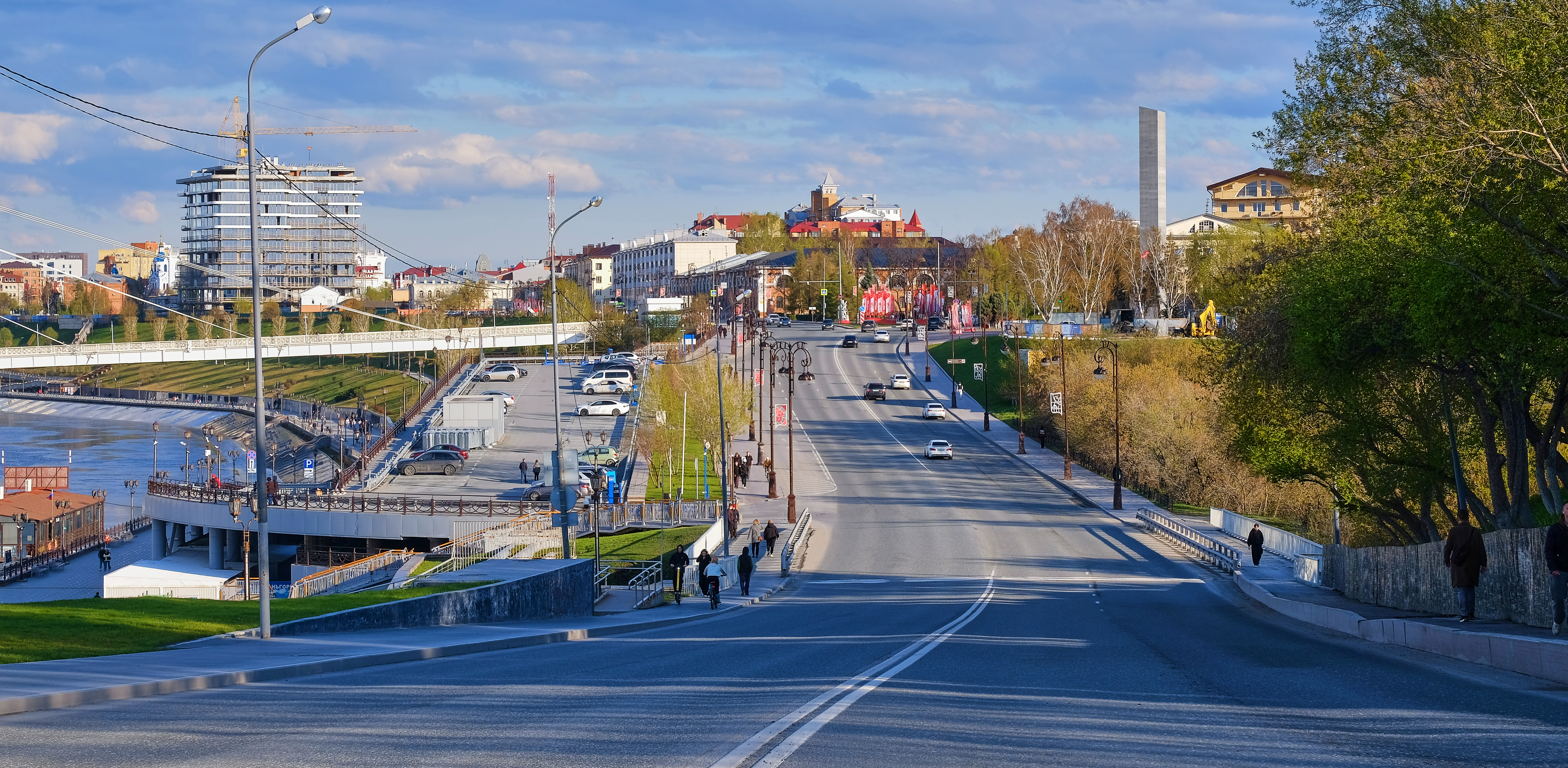
View of Tyumen, Siberia, on 2 May 2026

- 1 May – Presenter TV Nikolay Drozdov ends his career due to cancer.
- 4 May –
  - President Putin removes Sergey Melikov as head of Dagestan and replaces him on a temporary basis with Fyodor Shchukin.
  - President Putin appoints Aleksandr Chayko as commander of the Russian Aerospace Forces.
- 10 May – President Putin submits to the State Duma a bill on ratification of the cooperation agreement with South Ossetia.
- 12 May –
  - President Putin announces that Russia has successfully carried out a test of the new Sarmat, and says that the country will deploy the nuclear-capable missiles this year.
  - Two people are injured in a school shooting in Gulkevichi, Krasnodar Krai.
- 13 May – The State Duma passes a law on the right to use the Russian Armed Forces to protect Russian citizens arrested by foreign courts without Russia's participation.
- 14 May –
  - President Putin appoints Alexander Shuvae as acting governor of Belgorod Oblast, replacing Vyacheslav Gladkov, and Yegor Kovalchuk as governor of Bryansk Oblast, replacing Alexander Bogomaz.
  - The State Duma elects MP Yana Lantratova as Commissioner for Human Rights, replacing Tatyana Moskalkova.
- 15 May –
  - Thirty-six countries and the European Union join the Special Tribunal for the Crime of Aggression against Ukraine.
  - Putin signs a law easing citizenship requirements for citizens of Transnistria.
- 18 May – The United States extends sanctions relief on Russian oil for an additional 30 days.
- 19 May –
  - A hovercraft carrying tourists capsizes in Lake Baikal, killing five passengers.
  - The United Kingdom bans uranium imports from Russia with several exceptions.
- 20 May – France begins refusing temporary residence permits to Russians with humanitarian visas.
- 23 May – Rospotrebnadzor bans the import of mineral water Jermuk, two brands of wine and one brand of cognac from Armenia to Russia.
- 26 May – Six people are killed in a house fire in Yuryevka, Omsk Oblast.
- 27 May –
  - Russia restricts supplies of popular computers.
  - Russia signs a military partnership agreement with the Taliban in Afghanistan.
- 29 May – The UN adds Russia to its blacklist for sexual violence in conflict zones for suspected sexual violence against Ukrainians during the Russo-Ukrainian war.

=== June ===
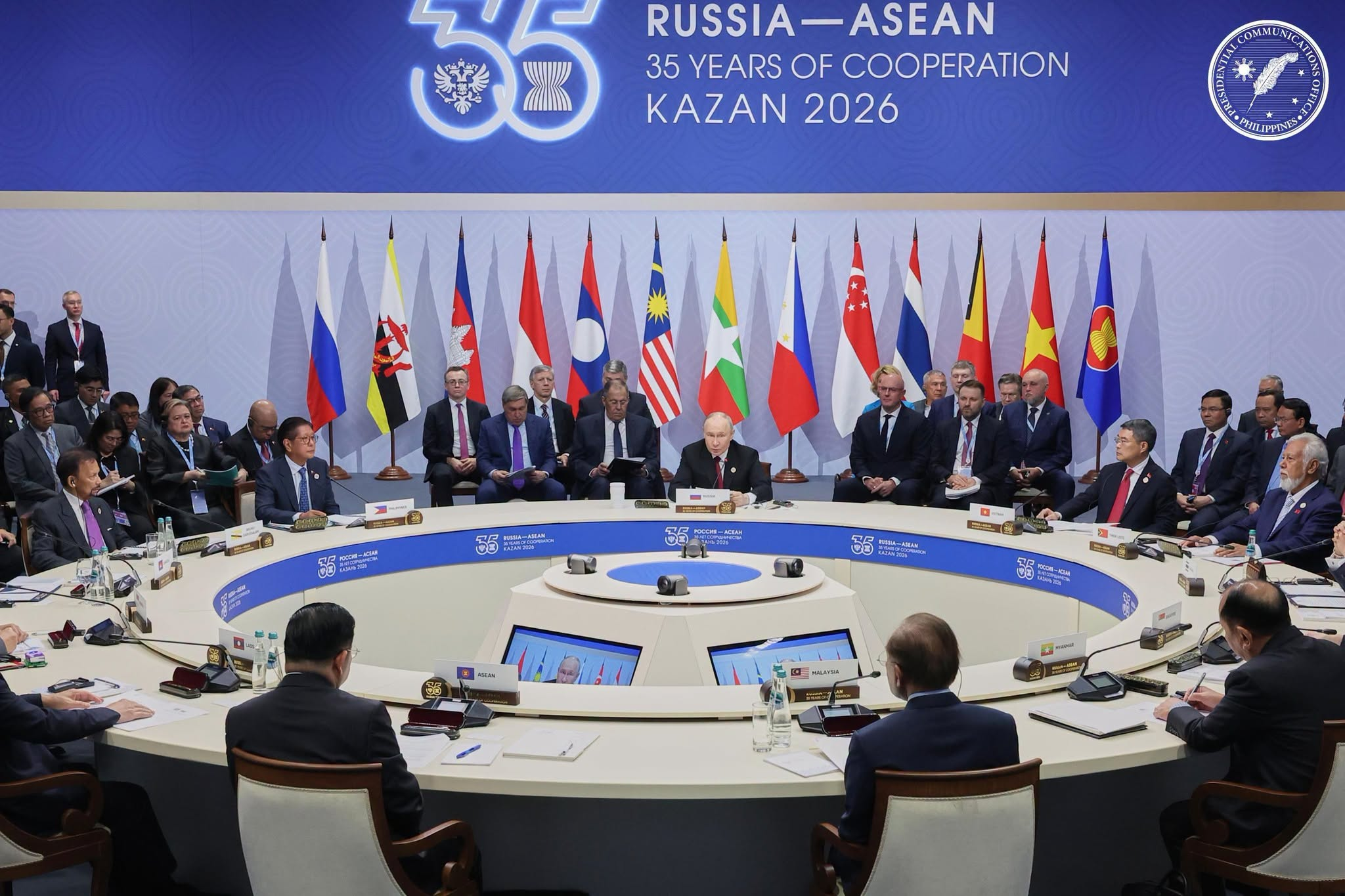
Russian President Vladimir Putin and ASEAN leaders during the ASEAN–Russia Commemorative Summit in Kazan, Russia, 18 June 2026

- 1 June –
  - Russia imposes a ban on the export of aviation fuel until 30 November.
  - Rosselkhoznadzor bans the importation of fish from all but two processing plants in Armenia.
- 10 June –
  - FIDE suspends Russia for holding chess competitions in Crimea and other occupied territories of Ukraine.
  - The Russian government lifts restrictions on access to Roblox.
  - President Putin signs a law allowing for the seizure of property and bank funds of expatriate Russians accused of acting against national interests.
  - Russia and Belarus sign a memorandum of understanding to "harmonize" both countries' judicial systems.
- 12 June – Three people are killed in an explosion at a gas complex in Ust-Luga, Leningrad Oblast.
- 15 June –
  - A Tupolev Tu-22M3 bomber aircraft crashes during a training flight in Irkutsk Oblast. The crew eject safely.
  - The European Union imposes sanctions on Prosecutor General Aleksandr Gutsan, Metropolitan Tikhon Shevkunov and several other individuals and entities over the war in Ukraine and the death of Alexei Navalny.
- 20 June – One person is killed in a mass stabbing at a mall in Krasnodar.
- 22 June – A tornado hits Kushva in Sverdlovsk Oblast, injuring 16 people.
- 29 June – The FSB arrests a militant who planned to ignite a synagogue in Yaroslavl.

=== July ===
- 13 July –
  - The International Olympic Committee lifts the suspension of the Russian Olympic Committee from international competition that had been imposed since the beginning of the Russo-Ukrainian war.
  - The EU and UK impose coordinated sanctions on Russia in response to cyber attacks in Europe, accusing the FSB of recent hostile acts.
  - The UK bans the GRU Volunteer Corps.
- 17 July – Ilya Remeslo, a former pro-Kremlin blogger who started openly criticizing President Putin, is arrested for two months for spreading "fake news" about the Russo-Ukrainian war.
- 23 July – An Su-57 fighter jet crashes in Odintsovsky District, Moscow Oblast during a training mission. The pilot ejects from the aircraft.
- 24 July – The United States imposes a 12.5% tariff on Russia, citing the presence of alleged forced labor in the supply chain.
- 27 July – The FSB arrests a 55-year-old man in Khabarovsk on charges of spying for the New Zealand Security Intelligence Service.
- 29 July – The FSB charges Telegram founder Pavel Durov of assisting Ukraine's "terrorism".

=== August ===
- 1 August – 2026 Moscow bombing: An explosion in an Italian restaurant-café in Moscow leaves five dead, including the bomber.
- 3 August – A Russian soldier carries out a mass shooting in Khmelnytske, Crimea, killing four people including another soldier before being arrested.
- 9 August – Syria and Russia reach an agreement on the future of Tartus and Khmeimim military bases following 18 months of negotiations.
- 10 August –
  - The Supreme Court annuls the registration of Yabloko following an appeal from Rodina, barring the party from competing in the 2026 Russian legislative election.
  - Russia releases a former US Marine imprisoned in the country on humanitarian grounds following a personal appeal from US President Donald Trump to President Putin.
- 12 August – President Putin declares that Russia will seize European vessels if European states carry out plans to seize commercial ships carrying Russian cargo, adding that the country will respond outside the waters where its ships are seized.
- 17 August – A court in Pskov sentences Lev Shlosberg to 11 years' imprisonment for his criticism of the Russo-Ukrainian war.
- 21 August – Nikolai Bondarenko, a CPRF candidate to the 2026 Russian legislative election, is fined one thousand rubles for "demonstration of extremist symbolism", barring him from the election.
- 25 August – A fire at the Amur Gas Chemical Complex in Amur Oblast kills 15 people.
- 28 August – Iran's ambassador to Russia, Kazem Jalali, announces the resumption of a 2022 project to export 55 billion cubic meters of natural gas annually into Iran via Azerbaijan.

=== September ===
Group photograph of participants at the Third Russia–Africa Summit in Moscow, 29 October 2026

- 6 September – Thirteen climbers are killed in an avalanche on Mount Mizhirgi in Kabardino-Balkaria.
- 7 September – Russia orders the closure of the German consulate in Saint Petersburg and three German cultural centers in response to similar measures by Germany against Russian diplomatic missions.
- 8 September – The first road bridge connecting Russia and North Korea is opened over the Tumen River between Rason and Khasan.
- 11 September – A minibus collides with a car and a truck in Arkhangelsk, killing 13 people and injuring eight others.
- 14 September – The US imposes new sanctions on VTB Bank for alleged ties to the Iranian regime. (Note: VTB, already cut off from the dollar system due to Russo-Ukrainian war, now faces Iran-related sanctions, potentially exposing foreign banks and businesses to additional penalties, according to the US Treasury.)
- 18 September – Russia vetoes a US proposal for UN experts to continue monitoring UN sanctions on Iran over its nuclear program.
- 19 September – US President Donald Trump signs into law the “Lindsey O Graham Sanctioning Russia and Iran Act of 2026”, which in part allows him to impose tariffs of up to 100 percent on Russian oil buyers, including China and India, in response to the Russo-Ukrainian war.
- 18–20 September – 2026 Russian legislative election
- 20 September – 2026 Russian regional elections
- 22 September – Four people die after a fire at a shopping centre in Sterlitamak, Bashkortostan.
- 23 September –
  - A state of emergency is declared in Krasnodar Krai due to Ukrainian drone attacks on transport and agricultural infrastructure.
  - Two climbers are found dead on Mount Dykh-Tau in Kabardino-Balkaria.
- 28 September – Fourteen people die after a fire at a fireworks factory in Kubrinsk, Yaroslavl Oblast.
- 29 September – A Tupolev Tu-95 crashes during a training flight near Krasnoyarovo, Amur Oblast, killing six of its seven occupants.

=== October ===
- 5 October – Following the death of a researcher at the Irkutsk Anti-Plague Research Institute of Siberia and the Far East in Shelekhov from an "unknown" infection, dozens are placed under quarantine.
- 7 October – An Israeli-Russian woman is sentenced to 3.5 years’ imprisonment for providing less than $30 to the late opposition politician Alexei Navalny.
- 9 October – US President Donald Trump announces that he secured President Putin's agreement to release diesel into US and worldwide markets.
- 13 October – A Japanese journalist is arrested in Sakhalin Oblast on suspicion of spying.
- 16 October – A magnitude 7.0 earthquake hits Kamchatka Krai.
- 21 October –
  - President Putin announces the release of Stephen Hubbard, a 74-year-old retired American teacher who had been imprisoned by Moscow on charges of serving as a foreign combatant for Ukraine.
  - An Su-30 crashes in Kaliningrad Oblast. The two crew members eject safely.
- 23 October – The White House announces that President Putin and Ukrainian President Volodymyr Zelenskyy agreed to a ceasefire negotiated by US First Lady Melania Trump in Russian-occupied Oleshky.
- 24 October – A train collides with a minibus in Jewish Autonomous Oblast, killing six people.
- 25 October – The International Weightlifting Federation awards the hosting rights for the 2030 World Weightlifting Championships to Moscow.
- 30 October – Novaya Gazeta, the country's flagship independent newspaper, announces its closure, citing pressure by authorities.

=== November ===
- 1 November – A cyberattack is carried out on the official Russian air alert app, resulting in false warnings.
- 6 November – The US cuts off money exchanger MEXC due to transactions involving Russia.
- 17 November – Nineteen people are killed when an Antonov An-12 crashes in Kemerovo Oblast.
- 19 November – At a trilateral summit in Shenzhen, China, with US President Donald Trump and Chinese President Xi Jinping, President Putin agrees to a shared framework for strategic stability and nuclear risk reduction.

== Holidays ==
- 1–8 January – New Year's Day and Holidays
- 7 January – Christmas (Orthodox)
- 23 February – Defender of the Fatherland Day
- 24 February – Defender of the Fatherland Holiday
- 8 March – International Women's Day
- 9 March – International Women's Day Holiday
- 1 May – Spring and Labour Day
- 9 May – Victory Day
- 12 June – Russia Day
- 4 November – Unity Day

== Deaths ==
- 1 January – Mukhsin Mukhamadiev, 59, Tajik-Russian football player (Tajikistan national team, Russia national team) and manager (Tajikistan national team).
- 8 January – Evgeny Lyubivyi, 51, politician.
- 11 January – Pavel Akishev, 42, baseball player (national team) (death announced on this date).
- 14 January – Layonel Adams, 31, footballer (Banants, Cerceda, Isloch Minsk Raion).
- 17 January – Lazar Shvets, 86, Russian Orthodox priest.
- 24 January – Boris Belousov, 91, Soviet minister of defense industry (1989–1991).
- 3 February – Ivan Nikulin, 89, member of the Soviet of the Union (1984–1989).
- 5 February – Vladimir Kuroyedov, 81, admiral, commander-in-chief of the Russian Navy (1997–2005).
- 13 February – Roy Medvedev, 100, politician, Soviet dissident and writer (Let History Judge).
- 15 February – Maria Vagatova, 89, poet.
- 20 February – Zoya Dorodova, 85, singer (Buranovskiye Babushki).
- 24 February –
  - Irina Shevchuk, 74, actress (The Dawns Here Are Quiet, White Bim Black Ear).
  - Nina Gabrielyan, 72, poet, writer, and artist.
- 25 February – Natalya Klimova, 87, actress (Comrade Arseny, The Hyperboloid of Engineer Garin, The Snow Queen).
- 1 March –
  - Yuri Korolev, 91, ice hockey player (Severstal Cherepovets) and administrator.
  - Vadim Zelichenok, 70, track and field coach.
- 2 March –
  - Umar Dzhabrailov, 67, banker and politician, senator (2004–2009).
  - Nikolay Kolyada, 68, playwright, actor and stage director.
- 3 March –
  - Sergey Duvakin, 97, politician, chairman of the executive committee of the Jewish Autonomous Oblast (1971–1985).
  - Valentin Shcherbakov, 89, politician, member of the Soviet of the Union (1979–1984).
- 4 March – Ekaterina Vedunova, 45, actress (Sklifosovsky).
- 5 March – Alexander Guts, 78, mathematician.
- 6 March – Nikolay Kondakov, 76, politician, MP (1994–1996).
- 7 March – Eduard Apalkov, 56, footballer (Dynamo Stavropol, Belshina Bobruisk).
- 9 March – Sergei Nekrasov, 53, footballer (Dynamo Moscow, Khimki, national team).
- 10 March – Viktor Shreyder, 74, politician, MP (2011–2021).
- 11 March –
  - Valentin Gneushev, 74, circus director (Cirque du Soleil, Moscow State Circus) and choreographer.
  - Natalya Vetoshnikova, 104, tennis player.
- 14 March –
  - Lyudmila Arinina, 99, actress (A Teacher of Singing, Waiting for Love, Guest from the Future).
  - Nikolay Garo, 88, production manager, producer and actor.
- 16 March – Andrey Golikov, 80, actor.
- 19 March –
  - Khamid Gizatullin, 94, economist.
  - Alevtina Yelesina, 71, cross-country skier, Paralympic champion (1992, 1994).
- 20 March – Vladimir Shumny, 92, geneticist.
- 23 March – Yury Shvytkin, 60, politician, deputy (since 2016).
- 25 March – Nikolai Orlov, 73, herpetologist.
- 26 March – Rosa Salikhova, 81, volleyball player, Olympic champion (1968, 1972).
- 29 March – Kim Bukhantsov, 94, Olympic discus thrower (1956, 1960, 1964).
- 31 March – Eduard Koksharov, 50, handball player and coach, Olympic champion (2000) and bronze medalist (2004).
- 2 April – Artyom Brovkov, 46, rapper (KREC).
- 8 April – Sherig-ool Oorzhak, 83, head of the Republic of Tuva (1992–2007).
- 9 April – Arkady Yanenko, 85, physicist, people's deputy of the Soviet Union (1989–1991).
- 2 May – Boris Volodin, 94, member of the Soviet of the Union (1984–1989).
- 4 May –
  - Konstantin Tolkachyov, 73, speaker of the State Assembly of the Republic of Bashkortostan (since 1999).
  - Tatyana Lyubetskaya, 85, fencer.
- 20 May – Vadim Pokrovsky, 71, epidemiologist.
- 24 May – Taymuraz Akhokhov, 55, mayor of Nalchik (since 2018).
- 1 June – Larisa Zhukovskaya, 88, actress (War and Peace, Anna Karenina, The Black Monk).
- 4 June — Valentina Ignatyeva, 77, actress.
- 5 June — Naran Očir-Gorjaev, 52, military second lieutenant.
- 6 June — David Kaplunov, 91, scientist.
- 11 June —
  - Vladimir Sapozhnikov, 81, composer.
  - Leonid Shchukin, 81, ice hockey player and coach.
- 12 June — Yevgeny Chen, 92, triple jumper.
- 13 June — Felix Kreichman, 77, economist and politician.
- 15 June — Semyon Skrepetsky, 44, artist, opposition activist and blogger.
- 16 June — Lidia Litvinova, 76, member of the Soviet of the Union (1979–1989).
- 17 June — Aleksandr Samokutyaev, 56, cosmonaut (Soyuz TMA-21/TMA-14M), MP (since 2020).
- 22 June — Nina Brashkina, 87, member of the Supreme Soviet of the Russian SFSR (1971–1980).
- 26 June —
  - Nail Kutlugildin, 79, politician, member of the State Assembly of the Republic of Bashkortostan (1999–2013).
  - Sergei Ivanov, 73, chief of staff (2011–2016), deputy prime minister (2007–2011), and minister of defence (2001–2007).
- 27 June — Konstantin Khudyakov, 81, artist.
- 28 June — Alla Chernova, 82, actress (Don't Forget... Lugovaya Station, Secret of the Blackbirds).
- 11 July — Valery Serov, 86, chairman of the State Committee for Construction (1989–1991).
- 15 July – Vladyslav Duyun, 49, Ukrainian-Russian footballer (Rostselmash, Baltika, FC Vityaz Podolsk).
- 18 July – Sergei Agashkov, 63, Turkmen-Russian football player (SKA Rostov-on-Don, Torpedo Moscow) and manager (FShM Moscow).
- 9 August – Ilya Kuleshin, 25, footballer (Khimik-Arsenal, Arsenal Tula, Avangard Kursk).
- 10 August – Pavel Syutkin, 104, army officer.
- 23 August – Boris Ebzeyev, 76, head of Karachay-Cherkessia (2008–2011), judge of the Constitutional Court (1991–2008), and member of the Central Election Commission (2011–2026).
- 26 August – Vladimir Germanenko, 82, politician, senator (2001–2008).
- 5 September – Georgy Matyukhin, 91, governor of the Central Bank of Russia (1992).
- 12 September – Nikolay Podgornov, 77, governor of Vologda Oblast (1991–1996).
- 13 September – Anton Grunis, 46, military commander.
- 17 September – Sergei Tchepikov, 59, biathlete and cross-country skier, Olympic champion (1988, 1994) and MP (since 2016).
- 22 September – Konstantin Polezhayev, 54, mayor of Belgorod (2015–2019) and deputy governor of Belgorod Oblast (2019–2023). (death announced on this date)
- 1 October – Alisa Aksyonova, 95, museum director.
- 3 October –
  - Anatoly Kashpirovsky, 87, hypnotherapist.
  - Sergey Mikhalyov, 73, Rostov Oblast MLA (since 2013).
- 7 October – Kirill Gasilin, 47, fashion designer.
- 10 October – Musa Taimazov, 42, club thrower, Paralympic champion (2020).
- 21 October – Nikolay Koshman, 82, deputy prime minister (1999–2000).
- 24 October – Oleg Breyev, 54, member of the Kursk Oblast Duma (since 2026).
- 25 October – Misha Mavashi, 41, rapper and political activist (Northern Man).
- 26 October – David Rigert, 79, weightlifter, Olympic champion (1976).
- 5 November – Pavel Moiseyev, 38, educator, member of the Tambov Oblast Duma (since 2022).
- 6 November – Platon Udovenko, 85, Russian Orthodox prelate.
- 7 November – Lidiya Fedoseyeva-Shukshina, 88, actress (Happy Go Lucky, The Red Snowball Tree, The Youth of Peter the Great).
- 11 November – Alexander Darchiev, 66, ambassador to the United States (since 2025).
- 14 November – Vatsilov Davudov, 31, Russian judoka and sambo practitioner.
- 16 November –
  - Mikhail Poltoranin, 86, journalist (Moskovskaya Pravda) and deputy prime minister (1992).
  - Ivan Zhuravlyov, 99, member of the Supreme Soviet of the Mari ASSR (1980–1990).
- 17 November – Andrei Makarov, 51, Kirov Oblast MLA (since 2026).
