= Apalkov =

Apalkov (Russian: Апальков) is a Russian masculine surname, its feminine counterpart is Apalkova. It may refer to

- Daniil Apalkov (born 1992), Russian professional ice hockey player
- Eduard Apalkov (1970–2026), Russian football player
