= Syutkin =

Syutkin or Siutkin (Russian: Сюткин) is a Russian surname. It may refer to one of the following persons:

- Valeri Syutkin (born 1958), singer
- Pavel Syutkin (military officer) (1922–2026), Soviet Red Army colonel
