= Pavel Pavlovich Syutkin =

Pavel Pavlovich Syutkin or Pavel Syutkin may refer to:

- Pavel Syutkin (military officer) (1922–2026), Soviet military leader, artilleryman, and colonel
- Pavel Pavlovich Syutkin (author), Russian food historian and author
