= Lazar Shvets =

Russian Orthodox bishop (1939–2026)

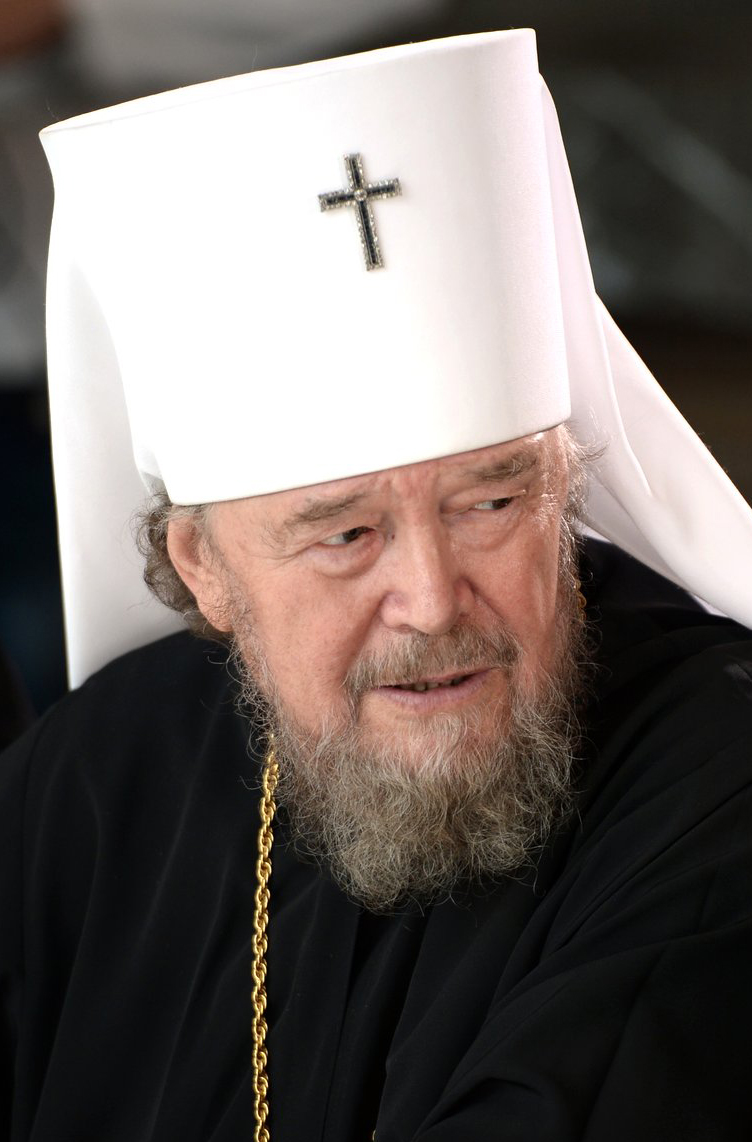
Shvets in 2015

Lazar Filippovich Shvets (Russian: Ростислав Филиппович Швец; 22 April 1939 – 17 January 2026) was a Russian Orthodox bishop.

== Biography ==
Shvets was born in Komarin, Volyn Oblast, Ukrainian SSR, Soviet Union on 22 April 1939. He entered the Dormition Zhirovitsky Monastery as a teenager. In 1957, he entered the Minsk Theological Academy. From 1958 to 1961 he served in the Armed Forces of the USSR.

He held a number of titles throughout his life, including Metropolitan of Simferopol and Crimea (1992–2023), head of the Crimean Metropolis (2022–2023) and Rector of the Taurida Theological Seminary (2006–2022).

In 2012, Ukraine awarded him the Badge of Honor "For Loyalty to Duty" (3 July 2012, Autonomous Republic of Crimea, Ukraine).

Shvets died on 17 January 2026, at the age of 86.
