= Khamid Gizatullin =

Russian economist (1932–2026)

- Хәмит Ғизәтуллин; Хамид Гизатуллин
- Born: 10 February 1932; Chuyunchi-Chupanovo, Zilairsky District, Bashkir ASSR, Russian SFSR, Soviet Union
- Died: 19 March 2026 (aged 94); Ufa, Bashkortostan, Russia
- Education: Bashkir State University
- Occupation: Economist

Khamid Nurislamovich Gizatullin (Russian: Хамид Нурисламович Гизатуллин, Bashkir: Хәмит Нурислам улы Ғизәтуллин, romanized: Xämit Nurislam ulı Ğizätullin; 10 February 1932 – 19 March 2026) was a Russian Bashkir economist. A member of the Russian Academy of Sciences, he was a recipient of the Jubilee Medal "In Commemoration of the 100th Anniversary of the Birth of Vladimir Ilyich Lenin" (1970).

Gizatullin died in Ufa on 19 March 2026, at the age of 94.
