= Sergey Duvakin =

Russian politician (1928–2026)

- Сергей Дувакин

Chairman of the Executive Committee of the Jewish Autonomous Oblast
- In office 23 November 1971 – January 1985
- Preceded by: Andrey Okovitov
- Succeeded by: Mark Kaufman

Personal details
- Born: 25 September 1928 Slobodskoy Uyezd, Vyatka Governorate, Russian SFSR, Soviet Union
- Died: 3 March 2026 (aged 97) Chelyabinsk, Russia
- Party: CPSU
- Education: Kirov Agricultural Institute
- Occupation: Veterinarian

Sergey Timofeyevich Duvakin (Russian: Сергей Тимофеевич Дувакин; 25 September 1928 – 3 March 2026) was a Russian politician. A member of the Communist Party of the Soviet Union, he served as Chairman of the executive committee of the Jewish Autonomous Oblast from 1971 to 1985.

Duvakin died in Chelyabinsk on 3 March 2026, at the age of 97.
