= Naran Ochir-Goryaev =

Russian military lieutenant (1973–2026)

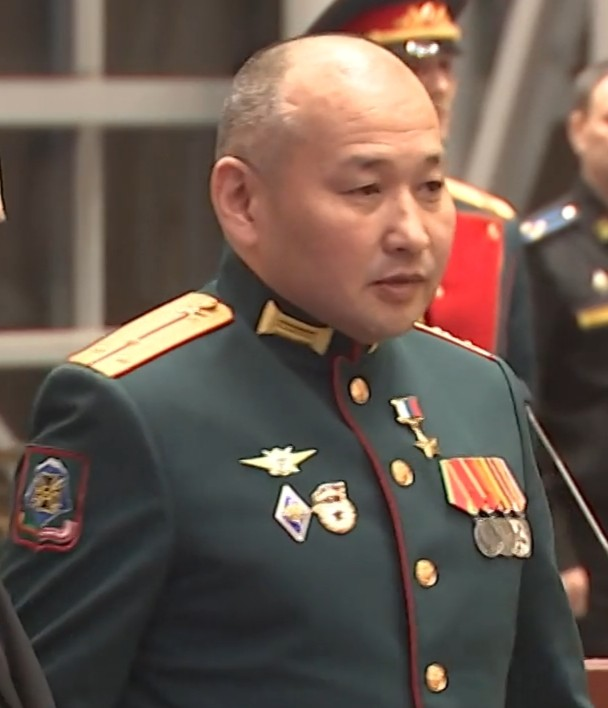
Ochir-Goryaev in 2025

Naran Alekseevich Ochir-Goryaev (Russian: Наран Алексеевич Очир-Горяев; 1 October 1973 – 5 June 2026) was a Russian military senior lieutenant and Hero of the Russian Federation.

== Biography ==
In 2025, Ochir-Goryaev participated in the annual Direct Line with Vladimir Putin at the invitation of president Vladimir Putin.

On 5 June 2026, the head of the Republic of Kalmykia, Batu Khasikov, announced that Ochir-Goryaev had died earlier that day. He was 52.

== Awards ==
- 2025: Hero of the Russian Federation
