= Andrei Makarov (politician) =

Russian politician (1975–2026)

- Андрей Макаров

Member of the Legislative Assembly of Kirov Oblast from the 2nd district
- In office 8 October 2026 – 17 November 2026

Personal details
- Born: 17 April 1975 Oparino, Oparinsky District, Kirov Oblast, Russian SFSR, USSR
- Died: 17 November 2026 (aged 51)
- Party: United Russia
- Profession: Politician

Andrei Dmitryevich Makarov (Russian: Андрей Дмитриевич Макаров; 17 April 1975 – 17 November 2026) was a Russian politician who was a member of the Legislative Assembly of Kirov Oblast from 8 October 2026 until his death.

Makarov died on 17 November 2026, at the age of 51.
