= Natalya Klimova (actress) =

Russian actress (1938–2026)

- Born: February 27, 1938
- Died: February 25, 2026 (aged 87)

Natalya Ivanovna Klimova (Russian: Наталья Ивановна Климова; 27 February 1938 – 25 February 2026) was a Russian actress.

== Life and career ==
Klimova was born in Moscow on 27 February 1938, to a Jewish-Russian family. In 1963, she graduated from the Moscow Art Theater School and got the lead role in the military drama "The End and the Beginning". She is known for her roles in Soviet cinema, including Comrade Arseny (1964), The Hyperboloid of Engineer Garin (1965), and The Snow Queen (1967).

Klimova died in Murom on 25 February 2026, at the age of 87.

== Selected filmography ==
- Comrade Arseny (1964) as Olga Genkina
- The Hyperboloid of Engineer Garin (1965) as Zoya Montrose
- The Snow Queen (1967) as the Snow Queen
- The Snow Maiden (1968) as Spring
- Tchaikovsky (1970)
