= Boris Volodin =

Russian politician (1931–2026)

- Борис Володин

Member of the Soviet of the Union
- In office 11 April 1984 – 25 May 1989

First Secretary of the Rostov Regional Committee of the CPSU
- In office 1 February 1986 – 5 April 1990
- Preceded by: Aleksandr Vlasov
- Succeeded by: Vitaly Suslin

Personal details
- Born: 21 August 1931 Svetlograd, Stavropol Krai, Russian SFSR, Soviet Union
- Died: 2 May 2026 (aged 94)
- Party: CPSU
- Education: Stavropol Agricultural Institute
- Occupation: Farmer; politician

Boris Mikhailovich Volodin (Russian: Борис Михайлович Володин; 21 August 1931 – 2 May 2026) was a Soviet and Russian farmer and politician. A member of the Communist Party of the Soviet Union, he served in the Soviet of the Union from 1984 to 1989 and was first secretary of the Rostov Regional Committee of the CPSU from 1986 to 1990.

Volodin died on 2 May 2026, at the age of 94.
