= Oleg Breyev =

Russian politician (1972–2026)

- Олег Бреев

Member of the Kursk Oblast Duma
- In office 8 October 2026 – 24 October 2026

Personal details
- Born: 12 March 1972 Lachinovo, Kastorensky District, Kursk Oblast, Russian SFSR, Soviet Union
- Died: 24 October 2026 (aged 54) Moscow, Russia
- Party: Liberal Democratic Party of Russia
- Profession: Politician

Oleg Viktorovich Breyev (Russian: Олег Викторович Бреев; 12 March 1972 – 24 October 2026) was a Russian politician who was a member of the Kursk Oblast Duma from 8 October 2026 until his death 16 days later.

Breyev died in Moscow on 24 October 2026, at the age of 54.
