= Nikolay Koshman =

Russian politician (1944–2026)

- Николай Кошман
- Koshman in 2014

Deputy Prime Minister of Russia
- In office 15 October 1999 – 7 May 2000

Personal details
- Born: 5 April 1944 Myronivka, Svitlovodsk Raion, Kirovohrad Oblast, Ukrainian SSR, USSR
- Died: 21 October 2026 (aged 82)
- Education: Military Logistics Academy
- Profession: Politician

Nikolay Pavlovich Koshman (Russian: Николай Павлович Кошман; 5 April 1944 – 21 October 2026) was a Russian politician who was a deputy prime minister from 1999 to 2000.

Koshman died on 21 October 2026, at the age of 82.
