= Arkady Yanenko =

Russian politician (1941–2026)

- Аркадий Яненко

Member of the Congress of People's Deputies of the Soviet Union
- In office 25 May 1989 – 5 September 1991

Personal details
- Born: 23 February 1941 Novosibirsk, Russian SFSR, Soviet Union
- Died: 9 April 2026 (aged 85)
- Education: Novosibirsk Civil Engineering Institute (DS)
- Occupation: Hydraulic engineer

Arkady Petrovich Yanenko (Russian: Аркадий Петрович Яненко; 23 February 1941 – 9 April 2026) was a Russian physicist and politician. He served in the Congress of People's Deputies of the Soviet Union from 1989 to 1991.

Yanenko died on 9 April 2026, at the age of 85.
