= Nail Kutlugildin =

Russian politician (1946–2026)

Nail Zakirovich Kutlugildin (Russian: Наиль Закирович Кутлугильдин; Bashkir: Наил Закир улы Ҡотлогилдин, Nail Zakir ulı Qotlogildin; 20 September 1946 – 26 June 2026) was a Russian Bashkir politician.

== Life and career ==
Kutlugildin was born in Ishimbay, Bashkir ASSR on 20 September 1946. He was a member of the State Assembly of the Republic of Bashkortostan (1999–2013).

Kutlugildin died on 26 June 2026, at the age of 79.

== Awards ==
- Veteran of Labour Medal
- Honorary Citizen of the City of Salavat (2007)
