= Nina Brashkina =

Russian politician (1939–2026)

- Нина Брашкина

Member of the Supreme Soviet of the Russian SFSR
- In office 1971–1980

Personal details
- Born: 12 June 1939 Luzhsky District, Leningrad Oblast, Russian SFSR, Soviet Union
- Died: 22 June 2026 (aged 87) Gatchinsky District, Leningrad Oblast, Russia
- Party: CPSU
- Profession: Politician

Nina Ignatievna Brashkina (Russian: Нина Игнатьевна Брашкина; 12 June 1939 – 22 June 2026) was a Soviet-Russian politician who was a member of the Supreme Soviet of the Russian SFSR (1971–1980).

Brashkina died in the Gatchinsky District on 22 June 2026, at the age of 87.
