= Lidia Litvinova =

Russian politician (1950–2026)

- Лидия Литвинова

Member of the Soviet of the Union
- In office 4 March 1979 – 25 May 1989

Personal details
- Born: 17 May 1950 Beloretsk, Bashkir ASSR, Russian SFSR, Soviet Union
- Died: 16 June 2026 (aged 76) Beloretsk, Bashkortostan, Russia
- Occupation: Metallurgist

Lidia Mikhailovna Litvinova (Russian: Лидия Михайловна Литвинова; 17 May 1950 – 16 June 2026) was a Russian politician. She served in the Soviet of the Union from 1979 to 1989.

Litvinova died in Beloretsk on 16 June 2026, at the age of 76.
