= Commissioner for Human Rights (Russia) =

Russian official to hear human rights complaints

- Уполномоченный по правам человека
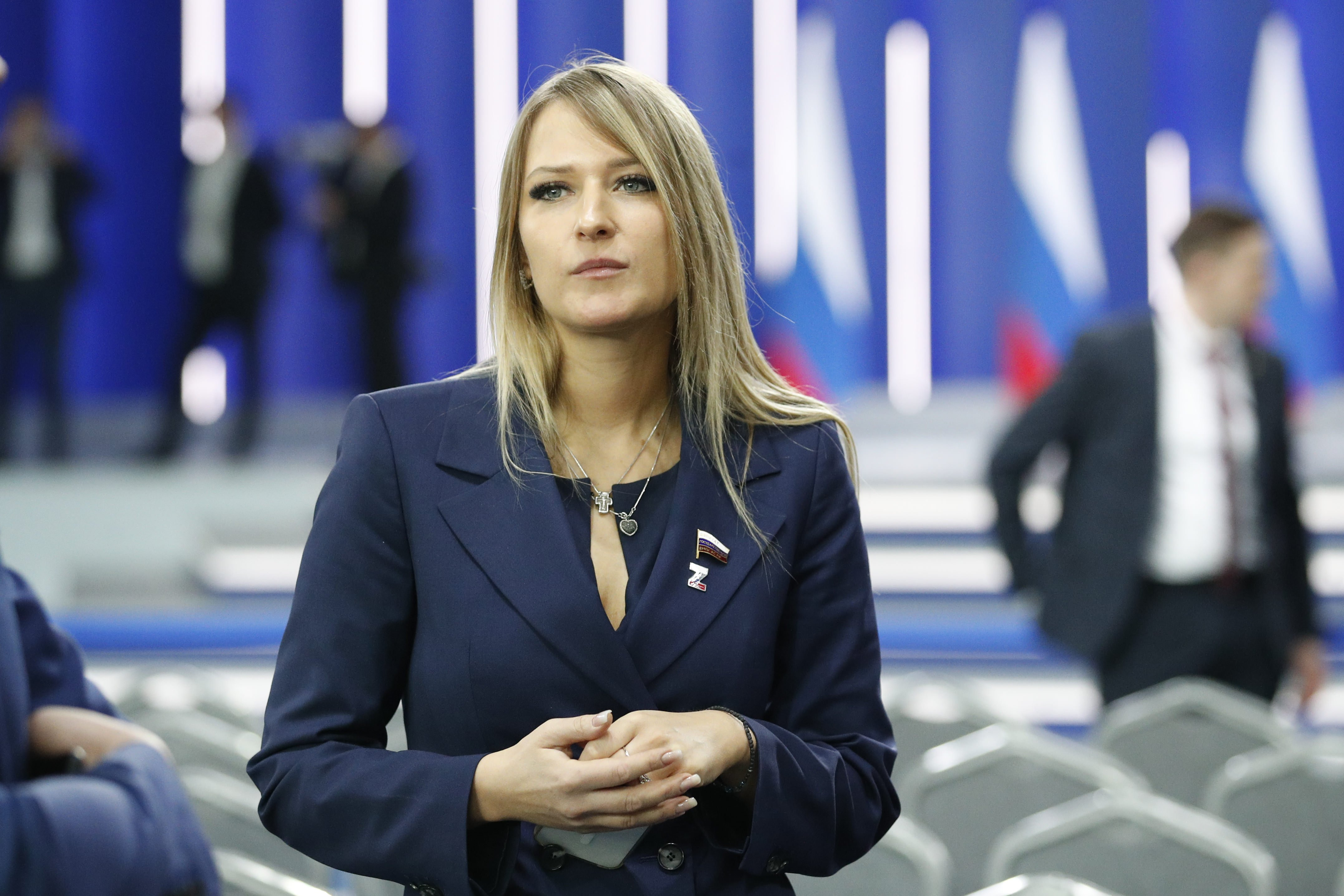
- Incumbent; Yana Lantratova since 14 May 2026
- Nominator: President of Russia
- Appointer: State Duma
- Term length: Five years
- Formation: 17 January 1994
- First holder: Sergei Kovalyov
- Unofficial names: Ombudsman (Russian: омбудсмен)
- Website: ombudsmanrf.org

Commissioner for Human Rights in the Russian Federation is an official appointed by the State Duma, the lower house of the Federal Assembly of Russia, to consider complaints of Russian and foreign citizens and stateless persons on Russia's territory of against decisions or actions of state bodies and officials.

This institution was introduced for the first time in Russian practice by the 1993 Constitution, which establishes that the Commissioner for Human Rights is appointed by the State Duma and acts in accordance with federal constitutional law. The authorized person in the exercise of his powers is independent and not accountable to any government agencies and officials. An institution of this type that exists in different countries is collectively called ombudsman, although the official titles of the position are different in different countries.

== History ==
On 22 November 1991, the Supreme Soviet, then parliament of Russia, adopted the Declaration of the Rights of Man and of the Citizen, Article 40 of which provided for the creation of the office of the Parliamentary Commissioner for Human Rights, and it was stated that they should be "appointed by the Supreme Soviet for a term of five years, accountable to it and enjoys the same immunity, as the people's deputy of the RSFSR". The following collapse of the USSR led to the fact that this position was not introduced for the next two years.

The post of the Commissioner for Human Rights in Russia was introduced by the 1993 Russian Constitution. However, the formation of this institution took place with great difficulty. The first Commissioner was Sergei Kovalyov, who was appointed by the State Duma on 17 January 1994. At the same time he headed the Presidential Commission on Human Rights, created on 1 November 1993. The commission was empowered to consider complaints of human rights violation to investigate these facts. At the time of Kovalyov's appointment, there was no federal act regulating the activities of the Ombudsman. Therefore, his activities were regulated by a presidential decree, which obliged officials to provide the Ombudsman with information necessary for his activities, and also established that, prior to the adoption of the relevant constitutional law, the Commissioner must exercise the powers vested in him as chairman of the Human Rights Commission.

In March 1995, the State Duma revoked the decision on the Kovalyov's appointment and the post of the Commissioner remained vacant for the next three years. At the end of December 1996, the federal constitutional law "On the Commissioner for Human Rights in the Russian Federation" was adopted. Only in May 1998, Communist Oleg Mironov succeeded Kovalyov as the Commissioner receiving 340 of 450 votes of MPs. His successors (Vladimir Lukin and Ella Pamfilova) were appointed on the proposal of the President of Russia Vladimir Putin.

== Requirements for candidacy ==
A citizen of the Russian Federation, at least 35 years old, who has knowledge in the field of human and civil rights and freedoms, and experience in protecting them, could be appointed to the post of the Commissioner. The Commissioner is appointed for a term of five years from the moment of taking the oath.

== Activity goals ==
According to the Federal Constitutional Law "On the Commissioner for Human Rights", the Commissioner promotes:

- restoration of violated rights,
- improving the Russian legislation on human rights and bringing it into line with generally recognized principles and norms of international law,
- development of international cooperation in the human rights protection,
- legal education on human rights and freedoms, forms and methods of their protection.

== Effectiveness of the institution ==
There are no uniform criteria for the effectiveness of the Ombudsman. However, in the Ombudsman's reports, information is published on the work with citizens' complaints. At the same time, the most important indicator of efficiency is the share of complaints, for which the Ombudsman was able to restore the applicant's rights. In addition, the right of the Ombudsman to file a complaint with the Constitutional Court in the interests of the applicant is also important. This right gives (in case of satisfaction of the complaint) the opportunity to declare unconstitutional the laws applied in the applicant's case, which allows the review of the cases in which this unconstitutional law was applied (even if they did not apply to the Ombudsman).

== Incidents ==
On 22 June 2018, activist Andrei Kiselyov came to the reception room of the Ombudsman's Office and staged a single picket at the entrance in support of the arrested defendants in the "New Greatness" case. An employee of the Ombudsman's Office invited Kiselyov to a special room to write an application addressed to the Ombudsman. The activist entered there with two journalists. The officer gave him a paper and called the police. The policemen took Kiselyov straight to the police office in the presence of journalists. There, a protocol was drawn up on him under Article 20.2 of the Code on Administrative Offenses for holding an unauthorized single picket during the FIFA World Cup.

== List of the Commissioners ==
Portrait	Name	Took office	Left office	Length of service	Political party	President
1	Sergei Kovalyov	17 January 1994	10 March 1995	1 year, 52 days (417 days)	Democratic Choice of Russia	Boris Yeltsin (1991–1999)
2	Oleg Mironov	22 May 1998	13 February 2004	5 years, 267 days (2,093 days)	Independent	Boris Yeltsin (1991–1999)
2	Oleg Mironov	22 May 1998	13 February 2004	5 years, 267 days (2,093 days)	Independent	Vladimir Putin (2000–2008)
3	Vladimir Lukin	13 February 2004	18 March 2014	10 years, 33 days (3,686 days)	Yabloko	Vladimir Putin (2000–2008)
3	Vladimir Lukin	13 February 2004	18 March 2014	10 years, 33 days (3,686 days)	Yabloko	Dmitry Medvedev (2008–2012)
3	Vladimir Lukin	13 February 2004	18 March 2014	10 years, 33 days (3,686 days)	Yabloko	Vladimir Putin (2012–)
4	Ella Pamfilova	18 March 2014	25 March 2016	2 years, 7 days (738 days)	Independent	Vladimir Putin (2012–)
5	Tatyana Moskalkova	25 March 2016	14 May 2026	10 years, 50 days (3,702 days)	A Just Russia	Vladimir Putin (2012–)
6	Yana Lantratova	14 May 2026	Incumbent	140 days (140 days)	A Just Russia	Vladimir Putin (2012–)

== See also ==
- Children's ombudsman#Russia
