= KREC (rap band) =

Russian rap band

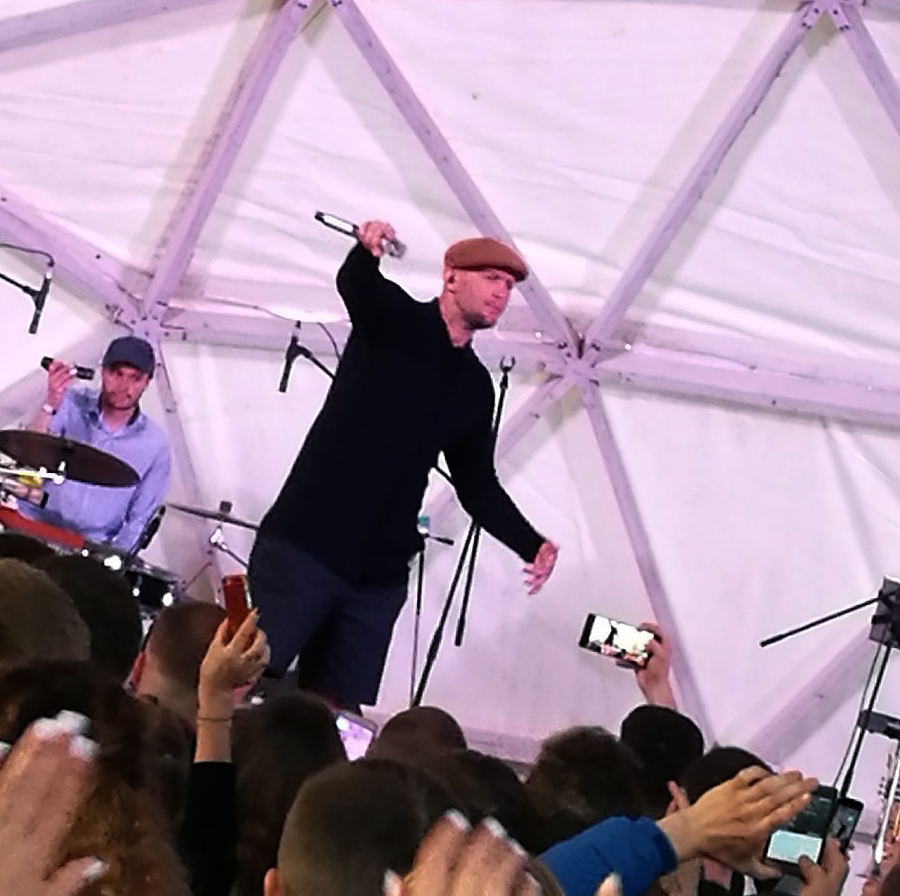
- Krec2 in 2018

Background information
- Also known as: Krec; kitchen-records; Кухня-Запись
- Origin: Saint Petersburg, Russia
- Genres: Rap; Hip hop; Jazz-rap; Acoustic rap; Abstract rap
- Years active: 2001–2026
- Labels: Infinity Music; Kitchen Records
- Past members: Assai; Marat; Fuze
- Website: www.krec.ru

Krec was a Russian rap band from Saint Petersburg. The founder and main MC was Artyom Andreyevich Brovkov (Note: In this name that follows East Slavic naming customs, the patronymic is Andreyevich and the family name is Brovkov.) (Russian: Артём Андреевич Бровков) known by his stage name Fuze.

== History ==
The band was formed in 2001 year by Fuze and beatmaker Marat formerly part of the Nevskiy bit band. In 2002, the group released their debut album Вторжение ("Invasion"). In 2003, Ассаи joined the band.

Their second album was Нет волшебства, released with the support of Smoky Mo and the UmBriaco band. This group appeared on Кара-Тэ (Karate) of Smoky Mo. These two albums became a turning point in Russian rap and the hip-hop family was named "St. Petersburg's new wave". The style of Krec was named "lyrics of light sadness". In 2009 Colta.ru, a magazine, included these albums in its list of the ten main Russian rap albums. The partnership with Smoky Mo and UmBriaco then ceased. The next year Assai released a solo album Другие берега ("Other Shores").

The next album По реке ("By the river") was released in 2006. The song "Нежность" ("Tenderness") from this album was used in the Питер FM (Piter FM) film OST. After this album, members of the band released solo albums. In 2007, Fuze released Meloman. After the separation, joint concerts were fewer, and members devoted more time to solo projects. In summer 2009 Ассаи officially announced his resignation from Krec. Fuze and Marat worked on the next album. Осколки ("Shards") in 2010. On 13 September 2012 the released Молча проще ("Silently easier"), darker, then Осколки, in their traditional style. In November 2012 Fuze announced the retirement of Marat.

In 2013, the band was joined by guitarist Denis Harlashin (Денис Харлашин) and female vocalist Lubov Vladimirova (Любовь Владимирова), and the band embarked on a tour. In 2014, the old members released Воздух свободы. Fuze deviated from hip-hop songs. Music in this album is similar to an "acoustic guitar song" or blues. The style was a return towards the "light sadness" from early albums, but without experiments with rhymes.

On 14 April 2016, the band released FRVTR 812. This time Fuze recorded solo and performed with guest musicians.

On 9 March 2017, Obelisk 16 was released, consisting of 16 tracks, most of which were released as singles in 2016.

(Russian: Krec — это имя, которое я несу с самого начала, и предложенная формула меня вполне устраивает. Если кому-то важна приставка «группа», могу набрать народу! Есть люди, которые верят в продолжение истории Krec, я делаю всё для них.

— Артём Бровков (Fuze), интервью для Rap.ru

(KREC - this is the name that I carry from the start, and the formula I was quite happy. If someone important the prefix "group", can recruit people! There are people who believe in the continuation of the story Krec, I do everything for them.)

Founder Artyom Brovkov (Fuze) died in a traffic collision on 2 April 2026, at the age of 46, effectively disbanding Krec.

== Membership ==
- Artyom Brovkov (Артём Бровков) (2001–2026; his death) – texts, vocal

=== Guest members ===
- Denis Harlashin (Денис Харлашин) (2013–2026) – guitar
- Lubov Vladimirova (Любовь Владимирова) (2013–2026) – back-vocal

=== Past members ===
- Алексей «Ассаи» Косов (Alexei «Assai» Kosov) (2003–2009) – lyrics, vocal
- Александр «Смоки Мо» Цихов (Alexander «Smoky Mo» Tsihov) (2003) – lyrics, vocal
- Марат (Marat) (2001–2012) – beatmaker

== Discography ==
=== Studio albums ===
- 2002 – Вторжение ("Invasion")
- 2003 – Нет волшебства ("No magic")
- 2006 – По реке ("By the river")
- 2010 – Осколки ("Smithereens")
- 2012 – Молча проще ("Silently easier")
- 2014 – Воздух свободы ("The air of freedom")
- 2016 – FRVTR 812
- 2017 – Обелиск 16 ("Obelisk 16")

=== Collaboration albums ===
- 2009 – Питер-Москва("Piter-Moscow") (Krec & Check)
- 2012 – Неизданный альбом ("Unreleased album") (2001–2005)» (Krec & Сэт)
- 2017 – Vol.1 NYC (KREC & Лион)

=== Solo albums by members ===
- 2005 – Другие берега ("Another shores") (Assai's album)
- 2007 – Meloman (Fuze's album)
- 2008 – Фаталист ("Fatalist") (Assai's album)

=== Digests ===
- 2004 – Invox (сингл) (Журнал «Invox»)
- 2005 – «Krec представляет: Сборник Лирик»
- 2008 – «Музыка» («2 + 2 = 5», инструментальный альбом)

=== Side projects ===
- 2008 – VA – Instrumental Boutique. Volume 2
- 2014 – XX FAM «Небоскрёб» ("Skyscraper")

== Videos ==
- 2005 – «Куда уходят корабли» ("When will the ships go")
- 2006 – «Нежность» ("Tenderness")
- 2008 – «Голос» ("Voice")
- 2008 – «Безразличие» ("Indifference")
- 2008 – «Пока я жив я буду помнить» ("As long as I live I will remember") (ft Check)
- 2008 – «Прости за всё» ("I'm sorry for all") (ft Check)
- 2008 – «Листья» ("Leaves") (ft Check)
- 2010 – «Блик» ("Glare")
- 2010 – «Правда улиц» ("The truth of the streets")
- 2011 – «Паром через» ("Ferry across")
- 2011 – «Еле дыша» ("Barely breathing")
- 2011 – «Марафон» ("Marathon")
- 2012 – «Как найти себя» ("How to find yourself") (ft I Diggidy)
- 2012 – «В никуда» ("Towards to Nowhere")
- 2013 – «Свет в конце» ("The light in the end")
- 2014 – «Воздух Свободы» ("The air of freedom")
- 2016 – «Пломбы» ("Seals")
- 2017 – «В Толпе» ("In The Crowd")
- 2017 – «Стреляй» ("Shoot me")
