= The Snow Queen (1967 film) =

- Directed by: Gennadi Kazansky
- Written by: Evgeny Schwartz
- Starring: Elena Proklova; Slava Tsyupa; Natalya Klimova
- Cinematography: Sergei Ivanov
- Music by: Nadezhda Simonyan
- Production companies: Lenfilm; Second Creative Collective
- Distributed by: Paramount Pictures (dubbed version)
- Release date: 1967
- Running time: 85 minutes
- Country: Soviet Union
- Language: Russian

The Snow Queen (Russian: Снежная королева, romanized: Snezhnaya koroleva) is a Soviet 1967 fantasy drama film, directed by Gennadi Kazansky and based on the eponymous 1844 fairy tale by Hans Christian Andersen.

On a frosty winter evening, the Snow Queen kidnaps Kai and turns his heart into a piece of ice. Gerda, wishing to return Kai home goes to search for him. She experiences many trials to get to the Snow Queen's palace and to retrieve Kai from icy captivity.

== Plot ==
The film begins with a storyteller introducing the tale of the Snow Queen. The story follows two children, Gerda and her adopted brother Kay, who live with their grandmother. A sinister Counselor, an agent of the Snow Queen, visits their home to demand the rare blooming roses gifted by the storyteller, intending to sell them for profit. When refused, the Counselor vows revenge. Soon after, the Snow Queen herself appears, claiming Kay as her own. Though the family resists, she kisses Kay, freezing his heart and changing his personality, making him cruel and distant. Later, during a sledding outing, Kay is lured away by the Snow Queen and taken to her icy palace.

Determined to find her brother, Gerda sets out on a journey. Along the way, she encounters various helpers and obstacles, including a raven and his bride who lead her to a royal palace. Mistaking the prince for Kay, Gerda is disappointed but gains the royal couple’s support, including a golden carriage and warm clothing for her journey. However, the Counselor, working with the king to capture Gerda, nearly succeeds in imprisoning her. The storyteller intervenes to rescue her, leading to a confrontation with the Counselor, but Gerda manages to continue her quest. Meanwhile, the Counselor allies with a gang of robbers to ambush Gerda’s carriage. The robbers capture her, but the gang leader’s lonely daughter befriends Gerda and helps her escape with the assistance of a talking reindeer.

The reindeer takes Gerda to the Snow Queen’s palace, where she finds Kay frozen and emotionless, attempting to complete a puzzle with shards of ice spelling the word "Eternity." Through her love and warm memories of their shared past, Gerda melts the ice in Kay’s heart, freeing him from the Snow Queen’s spell. Together, they triumph over the Snow Queen and return home. Their reunion is celebrated by friends and family, including the storyteller, who concludes the tale with the words, “The End.”

== Cast ==
- Valery Nikitenko – The Storyteller
- Elena Proklova – Gerda
- Slava Ziupa – Kay
- Evgenia Melnikova – Grandmother
- Natalia Klimova – The Snow Queen
- Nikolai Boyarsky – Counselor
- Yevgeny Leonov – King Eric XXIX
- Irina Gubanova – The Princess
- George Korolchuk – Prince
- Olga Viklandt – The Chieftain
- Era Ziganshina – The Little Robber
- Andrei Kostrichkin – Ghost
- Vera Titova – Inkwell

== See also ==
- The Snow Queen (1957 film)
