= David Kaplunov =

Russian scientist (1934–2026)

David Rodionovich Kaplunov (Russian: Давид Родионович Каплунов; 22 July 1934 – 6 June 2026) was a Russian scientist.

== Life and career ==
Kaplunov was born in Moscow on 22 July 1934. He graduated from the Moscow Mining Institute in 1956. In 1991, he was awarded the Prize of the Council of Ministers of the USSR "for the development and introduction of new technologies that reduce losses in the subsoil and improve the quality of marketable products in underground mining of ores in the Kryvyi Rih basin".

Kaplunov died on 6 June 2026, at the age of 91.

== Awards ==
- 1992: Honored Worker of Science and Technology of the Russian Federation.
- 1997: Corresponding Member of the Russian Academy of Sciences.
