= Yana Lantratova =

Russian politician (born 1988)

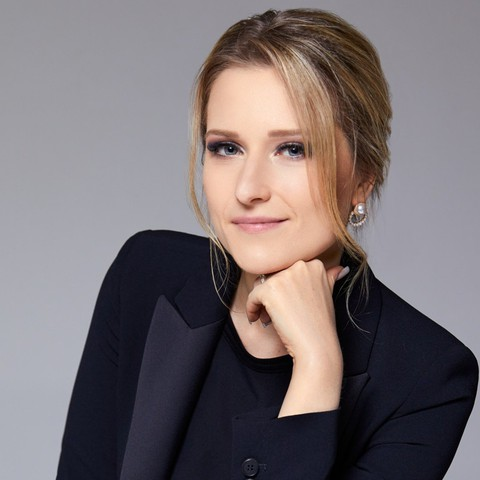

6th Commissioner for Human Rights in Russia
- Incumbent
- Assumed office 14 May 2026
- President: Vladimir Putin
- Preceded by: Tatyana Moskalkova

Chair of the State Duma Committee on the Development of Civil Society
- In office 26 February 2025 – 14 May 2026
- Preceded by: Olga Timofeeva
- Succeeded by: vacant

Member of the State Duma
- In office 19 September 2021 – 14 May 2026
- Constituency: Chelyabinsk Oblast

Personal details
- Born: 14 December 1988 (age 37) Leningrad, Russian SFSR, Soviet Union
- Party: A Just Russia
- Children: 1
- Education: Saint Petersburg State University; RANEPA; Moscow State Pedagogical University
- Awards: Order of Friendship
- Website: lantratova.ru

Yana Valerievna Lantratova (Russian: Яна Валерьевна Лантратова, born 14 December 1988) is a Russian politician who has served as Russia's Commissioner for Human Rights since 14 May 2026.

From 2021 to 2026, she was a member of the 8th State Duma. From February 2025, she chaired its Committee on the Development of Civil Society., she chaired its Committee on the Development of Civil Society. From 2015 to 2019, she served as executive secretary of the Presidential Council for Civil Society and Human Rights.

Lantratova is subject to sanctions imposed by multiple countries, including the United States, the United Kingdom, Canada, Australia, Japan, New Zealand, Switzerland and Ukraine, as well as the European Union.

== Biography ==
Lantratova was born on 14 December 1988 in Leningrad (now Saint Petersburg).

In 2011, she graduated with honours in public relations from the journalism faculty of Saint Petersburg State University. In 2012, she earned a law degree from the Northwestern Academy of Public Administration, and in 2019 she graduated from the psychology and education faculty of Moscow State Pedagogical University.

In 2006, she became a member of the Russian Association of Students in Public Relations.

From 2006 to 2007, she worked in television for MTV Russia, Muz-TV and 5TV, including on the programme Five Songs in Saint Petersburg.

In 2006, she founded and led the Stars Center, a youth organization that arranged visits by pop and film stars to orphanages, hospitals and boarding schools, and supported young performers. According to her Young Guard profile, it opened branches in more than fifty cities in CIS countries.

In December 2009, she became advertising and PR manager at a medical centre. The same year, she joined the Young Guard of United Russia, the youth wing of the ruling party, and ran its "I am a Volunteer" and "Accessible Environment" projects in Saint Petersburg. From August 2010, she coordinated the group's charity projects.

In 2010, she also worked as an assistant to a member of the Legislative Assembly of Saint Petersburg, and from May that year to the chair of one of its committees.

At the Young Guard's congress in December 2010, she was elected to its federal coordinating council and became national coordinator of several of its projects, including "I am a Volunteer", "Child Protection" and "A Family for Every Child". She also set up a centre to monitor violations of children's rights.

In 2011, she joined the board of trustees of Sanatorium Orphanage No. 39. She stood in the 2011 State Duma election on 4 December but was not elected.

From November 2012 to December 2018, she was a member of the Presidential Council for Civil Society and Human Rights, and she was also its executive secretary from 2015 to 2019. After leaving as a member, she stayed on as a permanent expert. From 2013, she chaired the coordinating council of the Union of Volunteers of Russia. In 2016, she was one of three candidates put forward to the president for the post of Commissioner for Children's Rights.

From 2017 to 2019, she was a chief adviser in the Presidential Administration of Russia, working on civil society and citizens' rights. She then moved to the Ministry of Economic Development, where she headed a humanitarian projects division (2019–2020) and was deputy director of its department for integration projects and CIS countries (2020–2021).

In May 2021, she joined A Just Russia, and in the September 2021 election she was elected to the 8th State Duma, where she served until 14 May 2026. In the Duma, she was first deputy leader of the party's group under Sergei Mironov, and first deputy chair of the Committee on Education from 12 October 2021 to 26 February 2025. She then chaired the Committee on the Development of Civil Society until 2026.

== Commissioner for Human Rights ==
On 14 May 2026, the State Duma appointed Lantratova Commissioner for Human Rights for a five-year term. She took the oath of office the same day.

After taking office, Lantratova said she and her team had prepared a work plan of 63 initiatives. She named her priorities as protecting people who come to her for help, especially orphans and people with disabilities; labour and housing rights, including for people moved out of unsafe housing; and housing for orphans. She also said she would pay special attention to conditions in prisons and other places of detention.

== Sanctions and allegations related to Ukraine ==
Lantratova was sanctioned by the United States as a Specially Designated National by OFAC on 24 March 2022.

In February 2023, the United Kingdom sanctioned Lantratova in connection with Russia's actions in Ukraine.

Lantratova has also been accused by Ukrainian authorities of involvement in the transfer of Ukrainian children from Russian-occupied territories to Russia during the Russo-Ukrainian War. A 2023 investigation by Reuters reported that Lantratova visited the Kherson Regional Children's Home with Inna Varlamova prior to the removal of children from the facility into Russian-controlled territory.

In 2026, The Times reported that Ukrainian authorities alleged Lantratova had helped facilitate the transfer of two children from occupied Kherson to Russia, one of whom was reportedly later adopted by Russian politician Sergei Mironov.

She is sanctioned in the EU for her alleged leadership role in the forced transfer of children from Ukraine to Russia.

== Awards ==
- Badge "Participant in Emergency Response Operations", Ministry of Emergency Situations (2013), for her work during the floods in the Far East
- Order of Friendship of South Ossetia (26 August 2023), for developing ties between South Ossetia and Russia
- Order of Friendship of Russia (30 March 2026), for her legislative work
