= Alexander Guts =

Russian mathematician (1947–2026)

Alexander Konstantinovich Guts (Russian: Александр Константинович Гуц; 30 August 1947 – 5 March 2026) was a Russian mathematician.

== Life and career ==
Guts was born on 30 August 1947 in Berlin, in what was then the Soviet occupation zone. Throughout his career, he published more than 500 works and about 30 books and textbooks on mathematics, computer science, physics, sociology, history and ecology.

From 1974 to 2024, he worked at Omsk State University, and was the dean of the Faculty of Computer Science (2001–2022).

Guts died on 5 March 2026, at the age of 78.

== Awards ==
- 2017: Honored Worker of Higher Education of the Russian Federation
