= Valentina Ignatyeva =

Russian actor and musician (1948–2026)

Valentina Vasilyevna Ignatyeva (Russian: Валентина Васильевна Игнатьева; 15 January 1949 – 4 June 2026) was a Russian actress and musician.

== Early life and career ==
Ignatyeva was born in Kalinin on 15 January 1948. From 1970 to 1972, she was a soloist in the State Variety Orchestra of the RSFSR under the direction of Leonid Utesov. In the 1970s, she performed with the ensembles "Sunny Crown", "Lada", "Three Times Three", "Merry Guys".

She made her film debut in an episodic role in Alexei Ochkin's film "Races without Finish" (1977). She also appeared in the Soviet-Swiss military drama "Velvet Season" (1978), "Imaginary Patient" (1980), "Head of the Classic" (2005), and "Cherkizona. Disposable people" (2010).

== Personal life and death ==
Ignatyeva was the third wife of actor Viktor Koreshkov. Their son Ivan Koreshkov is a Russian Orthodox priest.

Ignatyeva died on 4 June 2026, at the age of 77.
