= Ekaterina Vedunova =

Russian actress (1980–2026)

Ekaterina Viktorovna Vedunova (Russian: Екатерина Викторовна Ведунова; 9 July 1980 – 4 March 2026) was a Russian theatre and film actress.

== Career ==
In 2004, Vedunova studied at the studio of VZ Fedoseev and graduated from the theatre department of Sobinov Saratov State Conservatory.

Vedunova acted in many plays including The Suicide as Maria Lukyanovna, Blaise as Marie-Madeleine, No. 13 as Jane Worthington, and Sylvia as Leslie the psychotherapist. She also acted in The Golden Chick as the Fox and The Snow Queen as the Robber Girl in some of the children's productions.

Some of the television series she acted in were Univer. New Dorm as the librarian, SashaTanya as the cashier and Albert's girlfriend, Sklif, The Magnificent Five, Godunov, and Chernobyl.

== Death ==
On 4 March 2026, Vedunova died in a road collision near Saransk, Zubovo-Polyansky district, M-5 highway along with her 15-year-old daughter. She was 45. At the time of her death, she was involved in filming the 13th season of the series Sklifosovsky.
