= The Hyperboloid of Engineer Garin (film) =

1965 Soviet Union film

The Hyperboloid of Engineer Garin (Giperboloid inzhenera Garina)
- Original Czech film poster
- Directed by: Aleksandr Gintsburg
- Written by: Iosif Manevich; Alexander Gintsburg
- Produced by: Moisei Vainberg
- Starring: Yevgeniy Yevstigneyev; Vsevolod Safonov; Mikhail Astangov; Natalya Klimova
- Cinematography: Alexander Rybin
- Music by: Moisey Vainberg
- Production company: Gorky Film Studio
- Release date: 1965
- Running time: 96 minutes
- Country: Soviet Union
- Language: Russian

The Hyperboloid of Engineer Garin (Russian: Гиперболоид инженера Гарина, translit. Giperboloid inzhenera Garina) also abbreviated as Engineer Garin is a black-and-white 1965 Soviet science fiction film based on Aleksey Tolstoy's novel of the same name.

== Plot ==
In 1925, Russian engineer Pyotr Garin develops a weapon of unprecedented destructive power using the discoveries of Professor Mantsev—the hyperboloid, a generator of an intense heat ray. Garin devises a plan to use the hyperboloid to achieve his ultimate ambition: to become the ruler of the world. However, his invention attracts the attention of both Soviet intelligence agencies and foreign capitalists, sparking a relentless pursuit of Garin and his deadly creation.

== Awards ==
- IFF of Fantasy Films in Trieste (Italy) – Top Prize "Golden Seal of the City of Trieste", 1966

== Cast ==
- Yevgeniy Yevstigneyev as Pyotr Petrovich Garin (Engineer Garin)
- Vsevolod Safonov as Vasily Shelga
- Mikhail Astangov as Mr. Rolling
- Natalya Klimova as Zoya Montrose
- Vladimir Druzhnikov as Arthur Levy / Volshin
- Mikhail Kuznetsov as Hlynov
- Yuri Sarantsev as Tarashkin
- Nikolai Bubnov as Nikolai Mantsev
- Viktor Chekmaryov as Four-fingered
- Pavel Shpringfeld as Gaston / Duck Nose
- Bruno O'Ya as Captain Yansen
- Alyosha Ushakov as Vanya Gusev
- Anatoli Romashin as Dr. Wolf
- Valentin Bryleyev as Victor Lenoir
- Artyom Karapetyan as secretary
- Vyacheslav Gostinsky as comandant of the Golden Island
- Stepan Krylov as telegraph worker
- Vladimir Balashov as scientist (episode)
- Konstantin Karelsky
