= Andrey Golikov =

Russian theatre actor (1945–2026)

Andrei Borisovich Golikov (Russian: Андрей Борисович Голиков; 21 December 1945 – 16 March 2026) was a Russian theatre actor.

== Life and career ==
Golikov was born on 21 December 1945. He studied at the Moscow Art Theater School-Studio, graduating in 1969. He played his first role in the Moscow Art Theater as a student in the play "Weekdays and Holidays" based on the play by A. A. Galich and I. Greek.

From 1976, he was a member of the Moscow Art Theater troupe.

He also taught at the Moscow Art Theater School-Studio, VGIK and the Institute of Contemporary Art.

Golikov died in Moscow on 16 March 2026, at the age of 80.
