= Tatyana Moskalkova =

Russian politician (born 1955)

- Татьяна Москалькова
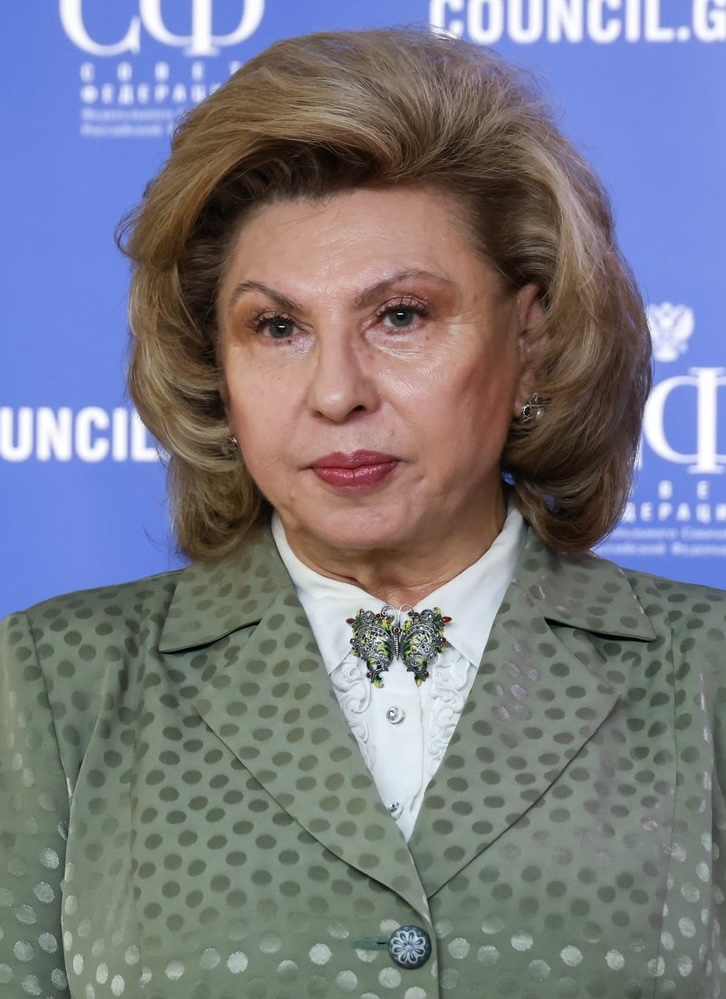
- Moskalkova in 2025

5th Commissioner for Human Rights
- In office 22 April 2016 – 14 May 2026
- President: Vladimir Putin
- Preceded by: Ella Pamfilova
- Succeeded by: Yana Lantratova

Member of the State Duma (5th and 6th convocations)
- In office 24 December 2007 – 22 April 2016

Personal details
- Born: Tatyana Nikolayevna Nosenko; 30 May 1955 (age 71) Vitebsk, Byelorussian SSR, Soviet Union
- Party: A Just Russia
- Other political affiliations: Communist Party of the Soviet Union; Yabloko
- Education: All-Union Correspondence Institute of Law
- Awards: Order "For Merit to the Fatherland", 4th class, Order of Honour, Gratitude of the Government of the Russian Federation, Honoured Lawyer of Russia

Tatyana Nikolayevna Moskalkova (Russian: Татья́на Никола́евна Москалькóва, née Nosenko [Носенко]; born May 30, 1955) is a Russian politician, lawyer, and former law enforcement officer. She served as Russia's Commissioner for Human Rights from 2016 to 2026. Previously she was a deputy of the 5th and 6th State Duma convocations.

Moskalkova holds Doctor of Sciences degrees in law and philosophy, and is an Honoured Lawyer of Russia. She is a retired major general in the police of Russia.

Moskalkova is known for her pro-Kremlin stance. She has condemned the Pussy Riot movement as "an attack against morality" and is critical towards the West.

In 2021, Moskalkova's declared income was 13.5 million rubles.

In February 2023, the European Union imposed sanctions on Moskalkova for her support of the Russian invasion of Ukraine and spreading disinformation about Russian filtration camps for Ukrainians. In May 2023, Moskalkova was included in Canada's sanctions list as part of "close associates of the regime" for "human rights violations, including the transfer and custody of Ukrainian children in Russia". She was also added to the United States sanctions list imposed on those involved in "unlawful transfer and unlawful deportation of Ukraine’s children". Since July 2023, she has been under Australian sanctions for her "role in directly or indirectly supporting Russia's illegal and immoral invasion of Ukraine". For similar reasons, Tatyana Moskalkova was included in the sanctions lists of Switzerland, Ukraine, and Japan.

== Biography ==
=== Early life ===
Tatyana Moskalkova (née Nosenko) was born in Vitebsk, Byelorussian SSR, Soviet Union. Her father was an airborne officer, and her mother was a housewife. Her father died when Moskalkova was ten years old, after which the family moved to Moscow.

Since 1972, she has worked as a bookkeeper at the Foreign Legal Collegium, and later as a records manager, senior legal in-house lawyer, and consultant at the Presidium of the Supreme Soviet of the Russian Soviet Federative Socialist Republic office for pardons. In 1978, she graduated from the All-Union Correspondence Institute of Law (now Kutafin University).

Starting in 1984, she worked in the legal department of the Ministry of Internal Affairs. There she rose from to First Deputy Head of the Ministry's Legal Department. She was officially discharged from the internal ministry on 22 December 2007, upon her election as a deputy. However, she did not fully resign from law enforcement but rather suspended her service, remaining on the ministry's personnel roster.

=== Lawmaker career ===
In 1999, Moskalkova ran for the State Duma as a candidate from the Yabloko party in the Rybinsk single-member constituency of Yaroslavl Oblast, but lost to Anatoly Greshnevikov.

In 2007, she was elected on the A Just Russia federal party list. She was a member of the A Just Russia faction and served as Deputy Chair of the Committee on Commonwealth of Independent States Affairs and Relations with Compatriots.

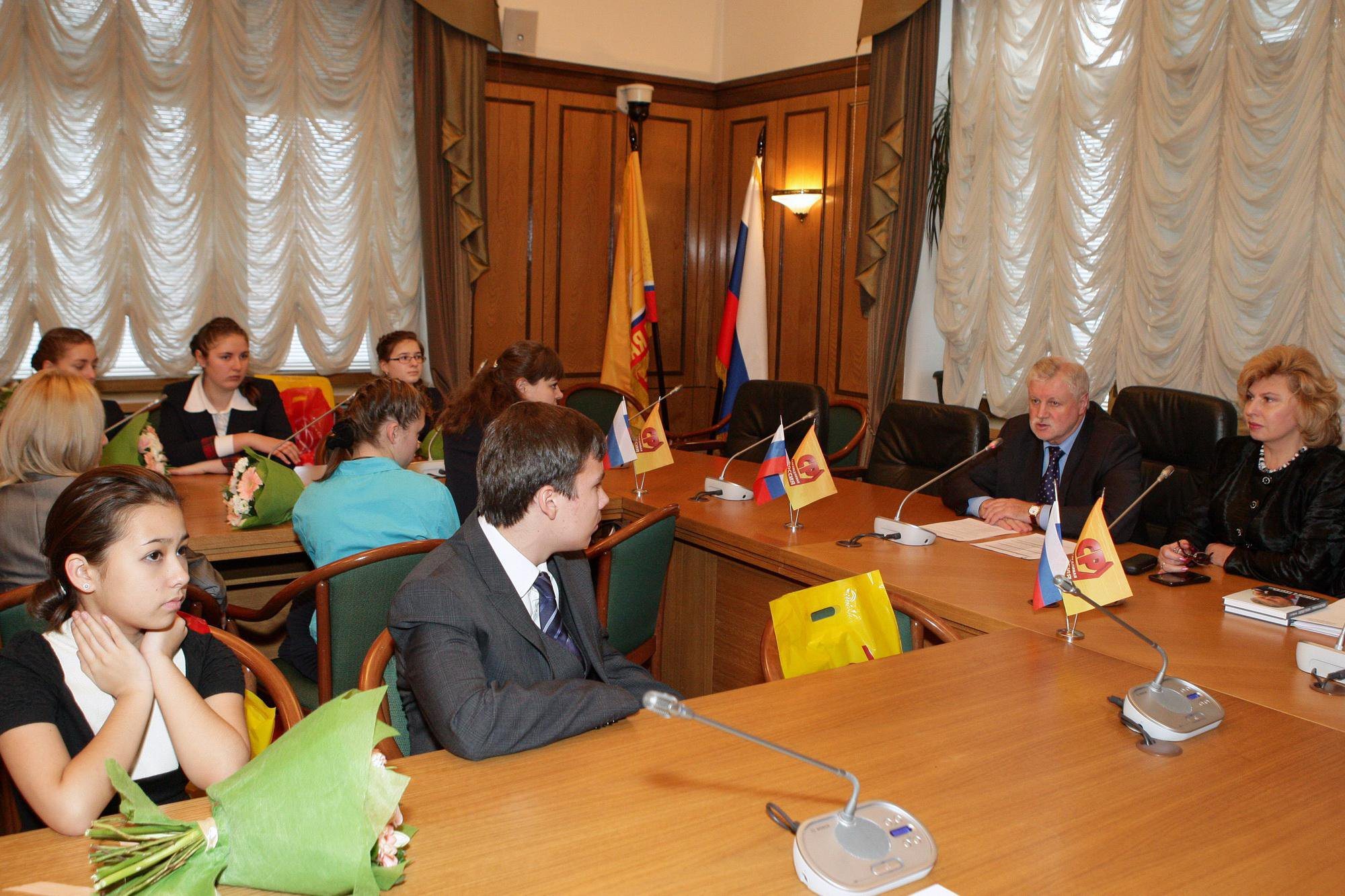
A Just Russia deputies of the State Duma, Sergey Mironov and Tatyana Moskalkova, during a meeting with children, December 2013

In 2010, Moskalkova opposed the creation of the Investigative Committee of Russia. She was re-elected in 2011.

Over nine years in the State Duma, Moskalkova participated in drafting 119 legislative bills. She was one of the authors of the so-called "One Day for Two, One Day for One and a Half" law, under which one day spent in a pre-trial detention center is counted as one and a half days in a general-regime penal colony and two days in a colony-settlement. The bill passed its first reading in the State Duma in February 2016. In 2013, she supported the law banning the adoption of Russian children by U.S. citizens (known as the Dima Yakovlev Law).

In 2012, Moskalkova proposed amending the Criminal Code of Russia to include a crime called an "attempt on morality and gross violation of the rules of community life", which would be punishable by up to one year of imprisonment. According to her, the reason for this was the actions of Voina and Pussy Riot. Her party colleagues, including party leader Sergey Mironov, did not support Moskalkova's legislative initiative. Later that year she proposed a draft law on conscription for females together with a group of deputies. In 2015, she suggested renaming the Ministry of Internal Affairs (MVD) to the All-Russian Extraordinary Commission (Cheka) and granting it "corresponding powers to restore order, and ensure the country's tranquility and security".

=== Commissioner for Human Rights ===
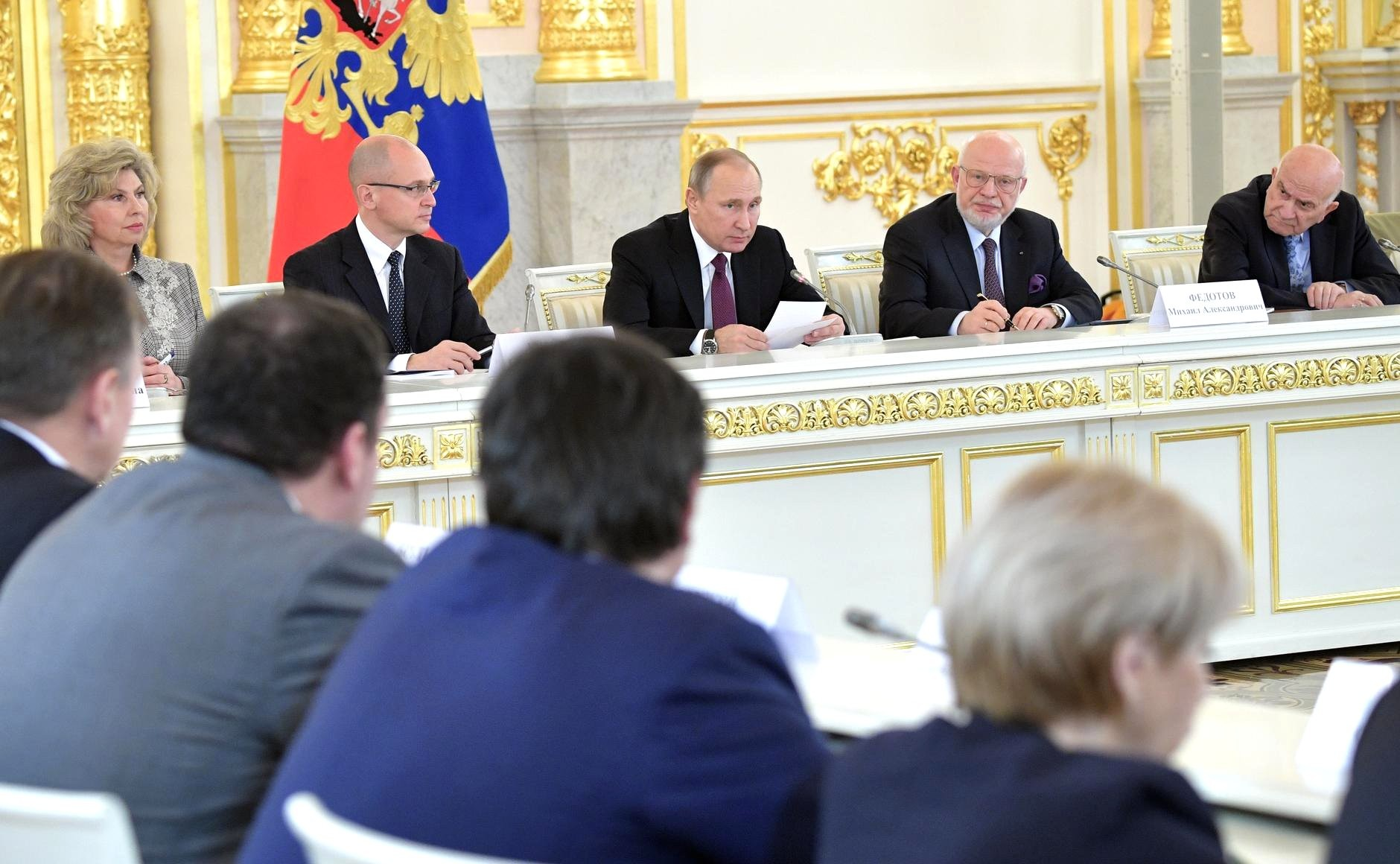
Moskalkova (left) during a Presidential Council for Civil Society and Human Rights meeting in December 2016

After Ella Pamfilova's appointment to the office of Chair of the Central Election Commission, the State Duma was tasked with electing a new Commissioner for Human Rights. The candidates nominated by the parliamentary factions were Tatyana Moskalkova (put forward by A Just Russia), Deputy Oleg Smolin (Communist Party), and Senator Sergey Kalashnikov (Liberal Democratic Party). United Russia party, the Federation Council, and President Vladimir Putin did not put forward their own candidates. During the vote on 22 April 2016, Moskalkova received 323 votes, Kalashnikov received 140, and Smolin received 97.

In her keynote speech on the day she took office, the new Commissioner stated: "The human rights agenda has begun to be actively used by Western and American structures as a weapon of blackmail, speculation, threats, and attempts to destabilize and pressure Russia. The Commissioner for Human Rights has sufficient tools to counteract these phenomena". She identified labor rights, healthcare, education, housing and communal services, and migration as priority areas. Later, she repeatedly stated that she does not recognize the use of the term "political prisoner", on the grounds that the Russian legislation lacks a definition for this term.

In an 2016 interview with Pavel Kanygin from Novaya Gazeta, Moskalkova stated that there is no law in Russia banning gay propaganda (the notorious Federal Law No. 135, known as the anti-LGBTQ law) and claimed that she denies any infringement of the LGBTQ rights in Russia since 2012. After being questioned about the existence of political prisoners, Moskalkova cut the conversation short, making Kanygin get out of the car where the interview was being recorded. However, according to Kanygin, about an hour later she did find him and asked him not to publish the interview, believing that in it she "looks bad, not like herself". Kanygin also noted that arranging the meeting with Moskalkova took about a month, and he had a persistent feeling that he was dealing "with one of the special services, rather than the office of the federal ombudsman". Specifically, staff from the Commissioner's office requested that the last ten issues of Novaya Gazeta be delivered to Tatyana Moskalkova's reception "for familiarization with the periodical".

In her report as the Commissioner for Human Rights for 2016, it was stated that out of 42,549 citizen complaints received that year, the Commissioner "personally reviewed" only 2,858 appeals. The report also lacked information on how many of the complaints resulted in the full restoration of the applicants' rights through her efforts.

In January 2017, Moskalkova's request to retain Article 212.1 of the Criminal Code, which provides for criminal liability for repeated violations of the rules governing the conduct of rallies, was read out during a session of the Constitutional Court of Russia. Moskalkova requested that the article be preserved "taking into account the demands of society". The lawyer for Ildar Dadin (Dadin being the only person convicted under this article at the time) called this statement "a stab in the back to human rights". In the end, the Constitutional Court upheld Article 212.1 of the Criminal Code but limited its application, following which the convicted Dadin was released and fully acquitted.

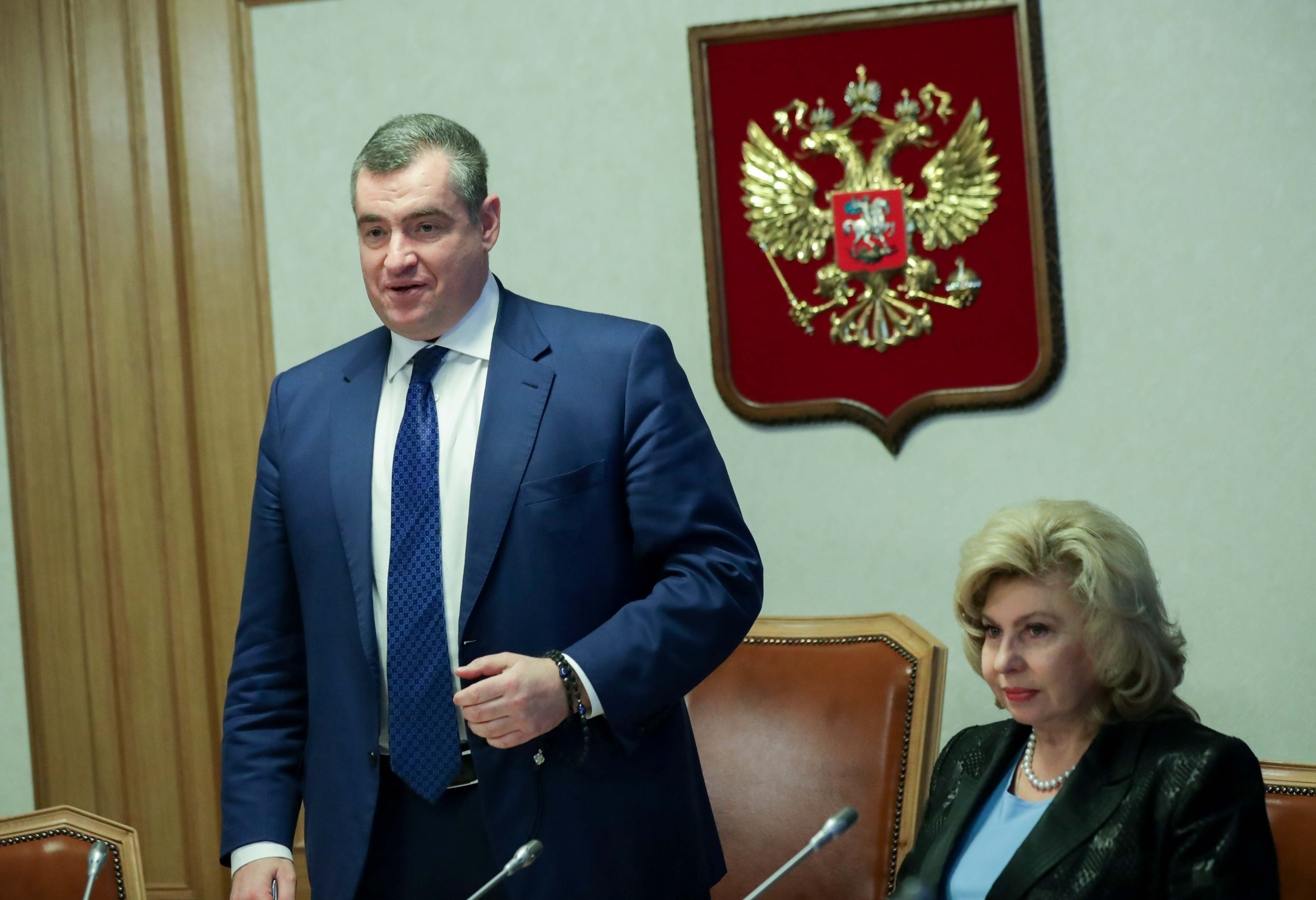
Moskalkova and Leonid Slutsky, November 2019

In 2018, Moskalkova supported State Duma deputy Leonid Slutsky, who was accused of sexually harassing three female journalists. Moskalkova dismissed these accusations as "utterly vile lies".

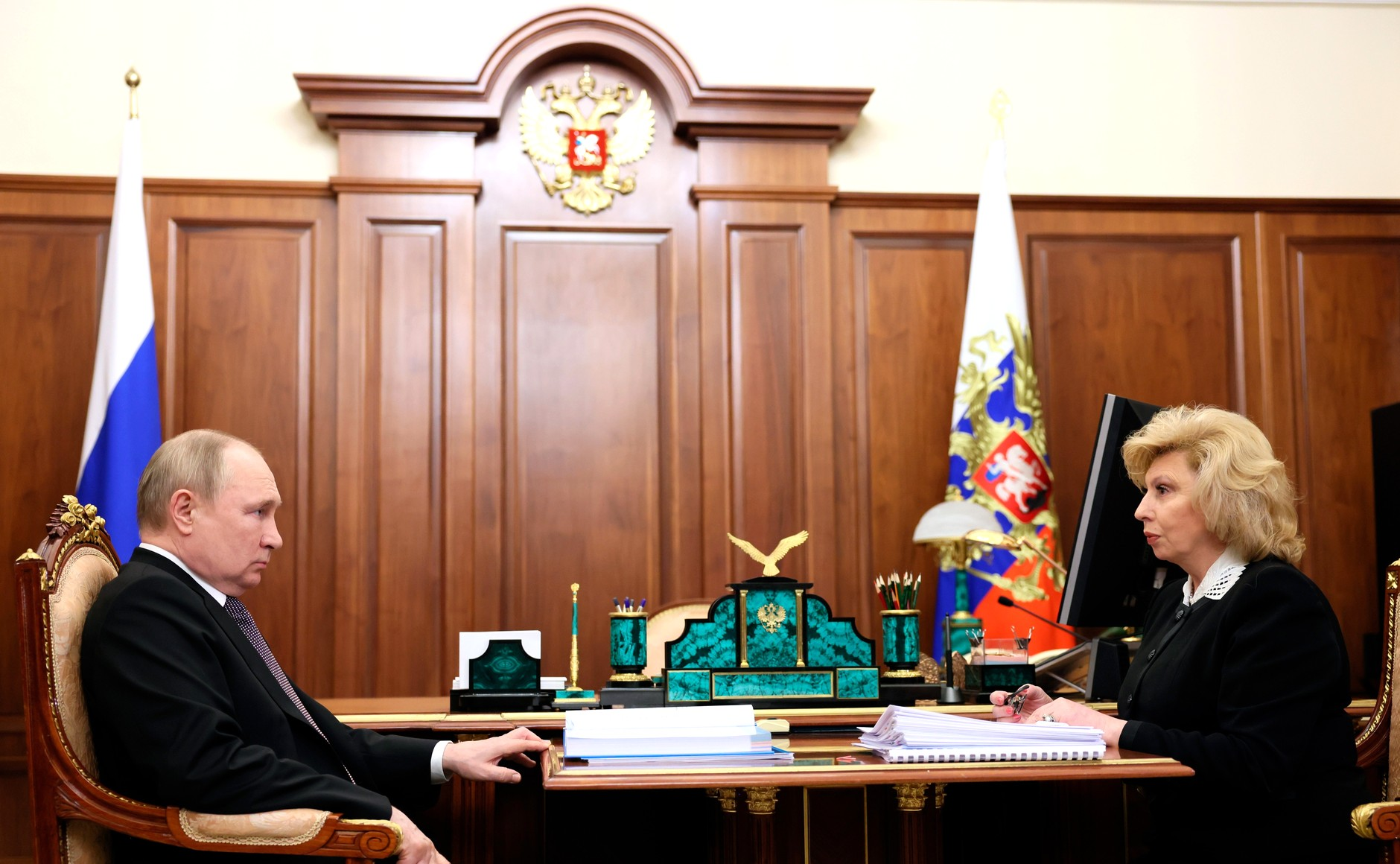
Moskalkova meeting with President Putin in June 2022

At Moskalkova's request, the Supreme Court of Russia overturned the decision to deport Ali Feruz. Additionally, Moskalkova requested that the case of Oyub Titiev be transferred from the Chechen police for investigation by a higher police authority.

On 14 June 2018, Moskalkova met with Ombudsman in Ukraine, Liudmyla Denisova, in Moscow. On 15 June 2018, she went for a meeting with Russian citizens held in Ukrainian prisons.

In 2019, Moskalkova supported the claims brought before the Supreme Court by young women from Tolyatti. They were challenging orders from the defence minister and the national guard director that barred women from military service under contract in positions such as sharpshooter, sniper, driver, mechanic, and tank operator, based on sex.

On 1 April 2021, President Vladimir Putin proposed that the State Duma reappoint Tatyana Moskalkova to the office of Commissioner for Human Rights.

In April 2023, Moskalkova was expelled from the European Network of National Human Rights Institutions (ENNHRI) because the Russian NHRI had failed to meet its membership obligations. This marked the first time in the organization's history that a member was expelled. In response, Moskalkova stated that she herself was leaving.

== Opinions ==
Moskalkova's appointment as Commissioner for Human Rights drew mixed reactions from human rights activists, who noted her lack of experience in the field of human rights protection, her support for several laws that they believed violated and restricted citizens' rights, as well as a potential conflict of interest stemming from her background with the internal ministry. However, Federal Chamber of Advocates vice president, Henri Reznik, expressed confidence that her reputation as a lawyer was a very important value for Moskalkova. The new Commissioner was also supported by Andrei Babushkin, a member of the Presidential Council for Civil Society and Human Rights. Leaders of human rights organizations, Svetlana Gannushkina and Valery Borshchyov, spoke positively about their first meeting with Commissioner Moskalkova.

Subsequently, assessments of Moskalkova's work have varied. For example, Zoya Svetova criticized Moskalkova for a 2016 visit to a Moscow pre-trial detention center, during which inmates were unable to pass complaints about conditions to the Commissioner, and the visit itself was accompanied by a crowd of journalists and the creation of feel-good photo ops. Another human rights figure, Lyudmila Alexeyeva, head of the Moscow Helsinki Group, spoke approvingly of Moskalkova's service as Commissioner in 2018.

== Awards ==
- Order "For Merit to the Fatherland", 4th class (2025)
- Order of Honour (2006)
- Gratitude of the Government of the Russian Federation (2014)
- Honoured Lawyer of Russia
