= Krasnoyarovo, Amur Oblast =

Krasnoyarovo Красноярово
- Selo
- Location within Amur Oblast Location within Russia
- Coordinates: 51°27′N 128°26′E
- Country: Russia
- Region: Amur Oblast
- District: Mazanovsky District
- Time zone: UTC+9:00

Krasnoyarovo (Russian: Красноярово) is a rural locality (a selo) and the administrative center of Krasnoyarovsky Selsoviet of Mazanovsky District, Amur Oblast, Russia. The population was 981 as of 2018. There are 15 streets.

== Geography ==
Krasnoyarovo is located on the left bank of the Zeya River, 46 km southwest of Novokiyevsky Uval (the district's administrative centre) by road. Leontyevka is the nearest rural locality.

== Russian Tu-95MS Bomber Crash ==
On September 29, 2026, a Russian Tu-95MS strategic bomber crashed during a training flight near the village of Krasnoyarovo. According to the Russian Ministry of Defense, the aircraft went down in an uninhabited area and was not carrying any weapons at the time of the crash. Out of the seven crew members on board, six were killed, while one was injured and evacuated to a medical facility. Regional officials stated that the crew made every effort to steer the aircraft away from residential buildings. The exact cause of the incident is currently under investigation by a commission of the Russian Aerospace Forces.
