= Comrade Arseny =

1964 film

- Russian: Товарищ Арсений
- Directed by: Ivan Lukinsky
- Written by: Arkadi Vasilyev
- Starring: Roman Khomyatov; Natalya Klimova; Vladimir Solovyov; Vladimir Zlatoustovsky; Konstantin Mikhaylov; Vladimir Vladislavskiy
- Cinematography: Vladimir Rapoport
- Music by: Tikhon Khrennikov
- Release date: 1964
- Country: Soviet Union
- Language: Russian

Comrade Arseny (Russian: Товарищ Арсений) is a 1964 Soviet historical drama film directed by Ivan Lukinsky.

== Plot ==
The film tells about the beginning of the revolutionary activity of the Bolshevik Frunze.

== Cast ==
- Roman Khomyatov as Mikhail
- Natalya Klimova as Olga
- Vladimir Solovyov as Father
- Vladimir Zlatoustovsky as Bobrov
- Konstantin Mikhaylov as Smolin
- Vladimir Vladislavskiy
