= Pavel Akishev =

Russian baseball pitcher (1983–2026)

Pavel Aleksandrovich Akishev (Russian: Павел Александрович Акишев; 30 January 1983 – January 2026) was a Russian baseball pitcher.

== Biography ==
Akishev was born in Moscow on 30 January 1983. During his early life, he was a pitcher for the Moscow-based team Moskvich. He played for the national team during the European Championships in 2003, 2005, and 2007.

Akishev died in January 2026, at the age of 42.
