= Sergey Mikhalyov (politician) =

Russian politician (1953–2026)

- Сергей Михалёв

First Deputy Speaker of the Legislative Assembly of Rostov Oblast
- In office 14 September 2018 – 3 October 2026

Member of the Legislative Assembly of Rostov Oblast
- In office 23 September 2013 – 3 October 2026

Personal details
- Born: 4 August 1953 Semikarakorsk, Rostov Oblast, Russian SFSR, Soviet Union
- Died: 3 October 2026 (aged 73)
- Party: United Russia
- Education: South Russian State Polytechnic University
- Profession: Politician

Sergey Alexandrovich Mikhalyov (Russian: Сергей Александрович Михалёв; 4 August 1953 – 3 October 2026) was a Russian politician who was a member and deputy speaker of the Legislative Assembly of Rostov Oblast from 23 September 2013 until his death.

Mikhalyov died on 3 October 2026, at the age of 73.
