= Felix Kreichman =

Russian politician and economist (1949–2026)

Felix Semyonovich Kreichman (Russian: Феликс Семёнович Крейчман; 8 June 1949 – 13 June 2026) was a Russian politician and economist.

== Life and career ==
Kreichman was born on 8 June 1949 in Tiraspol. He was the Deputy of the Supreme Council of the Pridnestrovian Moldavian Republic, Deputy Chairman of the Commission of the Supreme Council on Foreign Policy and International Relations (2001). He was also a Member of the Board of Directors of the Enterprises of the Republic under the president of the Pridnestrovian Moldavian Republic.

He died on 13 June 2026, aged 77.
