= Tatyana Lyubetskaya =

Russian fencer (1941–2026)

Tatyana Lvovna Lyubetskaya (Russian: Татьяна Львовна Любецкая; 11 February 1941 – 4 May 2026) was a Russian fencer and journalist.

== Biography ==
Lyubetskaya was born in Moscow on 11 February 1941, and began fencing in 1957. She won the gold medal at the 1961 World Fencing Championships in Turin. She won the silver and bronze medals at the USSR Championships.

She was awarded the title of Honored Master of Sports of the USSR.

Lyubetskaya also graduated from the Faculty of Journalism of Moscow State University. After the end of her sports career, she became a journalist. In co-authorship with Vitaly Arkadyev, she published the book "Dialogue about the Duel".

Lyubetskaya died on 4 May 2026, at the age of 85.
