= Don't Forget... Lugovaya Station =

- Russian: Не забудь… станция Луговая
- Directed by: Nikita Kurikhin; Leonid Menaker
- Written by: Iosif Olshansky; Nina Rudneva
- Starring: Georgiy Yumatov; Alla Chernova; Valentina Vladimirova; Valentina Kibardina; Muza Krepkogorskaya
- Cinematography: Aleksandr Chirov
- Music by: Yakov Vaisburd
- Release date: 1966
- Running time: 83 minute
- Country: Soviet Union
- Language: Russian

Don't Forget... Lugovaya Station (Russian: Не забудь… станция Луговая) is a 1966 Soviet romantic drama film directed by Nikita Kurikhin and Leonid Menaker.

== Plot ==
A passenger train carries ordinary travelers: a young man (played by Aleksandr Demyanenko) and a young woman (played by Valentina Lysenko) who pass the time playing the game "Cities." Sharing their compartment is retired officer Ryabov (played by Georgy Yumatov). During the game, the name of the station "Lugovaya" is mentioned, and soon the train arrives at that very station, where it makes a ten-minute stop. Many passengers hurry to the buffet.

At the buffet, the cashier recognizes Ryabov—they met at the same station during World War II. After a brief delay, Ryabov boards the train, seemingly leaving the past behind. However, as the train moves along the railway segment, he jumps off and returns to the station. With his return, memories of the war also come flooding back—military transport trains, refugee trains, bombings—and the events that once connected the main characters during those turbulent times.

== Cast ==
- Georgiy Yumatov
- Alla Chernova
- Valentina Vladimirova
- Valentina Kibardina
- Muza Krepkogorskaya
- O. Balyuv
- V. Batorov
- Oleg Belov
- Igor Bogdanov
- Aleksandr Demyanenko as Student
- Nikolai Korn
- Valery Lysenkov
- Pyotr Merkurev
- Ira Shabunina
- Yevgeniya Uralova
- Yelizaveta Uvarova
- Irina Chipizhenko
