= Valentin Shcherbakov =

Russian politician (1936–2026)

- Валентин Щербаков

Member of the Soviet of the Union
- In office 18 April 1979 – 11 April 1984

Personal details
- Born: Valentin Petrovich Shcherbakov; 9 May 1936 Sverdlovsk Oblast, Russian SFSR, Soviet Union
- Died: 3 March 2026 (aged 89)
- Party: CPSU
- Occupation: Farmer

Valentin Petrovich Shcherbakov (Russian: Валентин Петрович Щербаков; 9 May 1936 – 3 March 2026) was a Russian politician. A member of the Communist Party of the Soviet Union, he served in the Soviet of the Union from 1979 to 1984.

Shcherbakov died on 3 March 2026, at the age of 89.
