= Kirill Gasilin =

Russian fashion designer (1978–2026)

- Кирилл Гасилин
- Born: 8 December 1978; Kazakh SSR, Soviet Union
- Died: 4 October 2026 (aged 47); Moscow, Russia
- Occupation: Fashion designer

Kirill Alekseyevich Gasilin (Russian: Кирилл Алексеевич Гасилин; 8 December 1978 – 4 October 2026) was a Russian fashion designer.

== Life and work ==
Gasilin was born in the Kazakh SSR on 8 December 1978. He graduated from the Ukrainian Engineering Pedagogical Academy's Faculty of Textile and Light Industry in 2000.

He founded Cyrille Gassiline in 2007, debuting at the Moscow Fashion Week the same year.

Gasilin designed a number of costumes for international theatrical productions including My Fair Lady (2020) at the Russian Theater in Tallinn, Estonia, "The Afternoon of a Faun and His Nymph" for the Tokyo National Ballet, "La Bayadère" (2023) at the Tbilisi State Opera and Ballet Theater in Georgia, and “Swan Lake” at the London Coliseum.

Gasilin died on 4 October 2026, at the age of 47.
