= Nina Gabrielyan =

Russian poet, writer and artist (1953–2026)

Nina Mikhailovna Gabrielyan (Russian: Нина Михайловна Габриелян; 16 October 1953 – 24 February 2026) was a Russian poet, writer, poetry translator, artist and culture expert.

== Life and career ==
Gabrielyan was born in Moscow on 16 October 1953. She studied at the Moscow State Pedagogical Institute of Foreign Languages. She has published in a variety of genres, including poetry and fiction. Her collection of stories Master of the Grass has been translated into English under the Glas New Russian Writing imprint.

She trained as an artist with Boris Otarov. She worked mainly in oil and crayon. Her works are presented in the collections of Museum Exhibition Complex "Volokolamsky Kremlin", Moscow Naive Art Museum, Nagorno-Karabakh, Art Gallery in Shushi, and private collections in Russia, Armenia, the United States, Great Britain and Italy.

Gabrielyan died on 24 February 2026, at the age of 72.
