= Alla Chernova =

Russian actress (1943–2026)

Chernova in Night Shift (1970)

Alla Iosifovna Chernova (Russian: Алла Иосифовна Чернова; 26 September 1943 – 28 June 2026) was a Russian actress.

== Life and career ==
Chernova was born in Moscow on 26 September 1943. In 1965, she graduated from the B. V. Shchukin Higher Theater School.

From 1966 to 1967, she was an actress at the Moscow Satire Theatre. In 1967, she moved to Leningrad. She performed in the Leningrad Theater. In the 1970s, she was an actress at the Leningrad Comedy Theater.

Throughout her career she acted in a number of feature films, including Don't Forget... Lugovaya Station (1966), and Secret of the Blackbirds (1983).

At the age of 42, she ended her acting career due to serious health problems. She later taught acting at the St. Petersburg State Institute of Culture.

Chernova died at the Mariinsky Hospital in St. Petersburg, on 28 June 2026, at the age of 82.
