= Evgeny Lyubivyi =

Russian politician (1974–2026)

Yevgeny Dmitrievich Lyubivy (Russian: Евгений Дмитриевич Любивый; 3 April 1974 – 8 January 2026) was a Russian politician.

== Life and career ==
Lyubivyi was born in Alexeyevka, Belgorod Oblast on 3 April 1974. From 2018, he was the chief freelance specialist and surgeon of the Ministry of Health of the Kaliningrad Region, coordinator of the Healthy Future project from the United Russia party in the region.

On 19 September 2021, he was elected a deputy of the City Council of Deputies of Kaliningrad in constituency No 13. On 22 March 2023, Lyubivy wrote a letter of resignation from his mayoral post. Following his resignation, he returned to the post of chief physician.

Lyubivyi died on 8 January 2026, at the age of 51.
