= Chuyunchi-Chupanovo =

Chuyunchi-Chupanovo Чуюнчи-Чупаново
- Selo
- Location within Bashkortostan Location within Russia
- Coordinates: 52°26′N 57°03′E
- Country: Russia
- Region: Bashkortostan
- District: Zilairsky District
- Time zone: UTC+5:00

Chuyunchi-Chupanovo (Russian: Чуюнчи-Чупаново; Bashkir: Суйынсы-Супан, Suyınsı-Supan) is a rural locality (a selo) in Dmitriyevsky Selsoviet, Zilairsky District, Bashkortostan, Russia. The population was 137 as of 2010. There are 3 streets.

== Geography ==
Chuyunchi-Chupanovo is located 42 km northwest of Zilair (the district's administrative centre) by road. Kartlazma is the nearest rural locality.
