= Vadim Zelichenok =

Russian track and field coach (1956–2026)

Vadim Borisovich Zelichenok (also Zelichyonok; Russian: Вадим Борисович Зеличёнок; 14 January 1956 – 1 March 2026) was a Russian track and field coach and athletics administrator.

In 1977, he graduated from the SCOLIPE. From 1977 to 1983, he was a coach and senior coach of the Athletics Department of the Committee for Physical Culture and Sports under the Council of Ministers of the Soviet Union. He was the head coach of the Combined Team at the 1992 Summer Olympics in Barcelona. In 1992–1998, he was the head coach of the Russian national team.

Between 1983 and 1990, he served as senior coach of the USSR junior national athletics team. In 1990–1991, he held dual roles as head coach of the USSR national athletics teams and vice president of the USSR Athletics Federation.

From 1994 to 2000, he was the Secretary General of the All-Russian Athletics Federation (ARAF). From October 2000 to February 2015, he served as first vice-president of the federation, and until January 2016 he acted as president. He was a member of the development committee of the European Athletic Association and the European Association of Athletics Coaches.

In 1998, he defended his Candidate of Sciences dissertation on "Criteria for selection and formation of national athletics teams". At the same time, he was appointed director of the Moscow Regional Development Center of the International Association of Athletics Federations (IAAF). He was also a member of the IAAF technical committee and a lecturer in the Department of Athletics at the Russian State University of Physical Education, Sport, Youth and Tourism.

He lived in Moscow and died on 1 March 2026 at the age of 70.

== Awards ==
- Honored Coach of the USSR
- Honored Coach of Russia
