= Natalya Vetoshnikova =

Soviet tennis player (1921–2026)

- Vetoshnikova in 2011
- Full name: Natalya Borisovna Vetoshnikova
- Native name: Наталья Борисовна Ветошникова
- Residence: Saint Petersburg, Russia
- Born: 26 September 1921 Petrograd, Russian SFSR
- Died: 11 March 2026 (aged 104)
- Turned pro: 1934
- Retired: 1971
- Plays: Right-handed
- Coach: Zinaida Klochkova

Natalya Borisovna Vetoshnikova (Russian: Наталья Борисовна Ветошникова; 26 September 1921 – 11 March 2026) was a Soviet tennis player, Master of Sports of the USSR, USSR champion in singles (1937 and 1939), and doubles (1939).

== Biography ==
Vetoshnikova was born on 26 September 1921, and survived the Siege of Leningrad.

In mixed doubles she performed with Nikolai Ozerov.

In 2013, Natalya Borisovna entered the Russian Tennis Hall of Fame.

She was the author of the book Tennis in My Life: Memories (2010).

Vetoshnikova died on 11 March 2026, at the age of 104.
