= Leonid Shchukin =

Russian sportsperson (1945–2026)

Leonid Antonovich Shchukin (Russian: Леонид Антонович Щукин; 12 July 1945 – 11 June 2026) was a Russian ice hockey player and coach. He was also known for helping establish the sports of rinkball and floorball.

== Life and career ==
Shchukin was born on 12 July 1945 in Omsk. He was a member of the coaching staff of the Russian national floorball team at the 1994, 1995 European Championships, and the World Championships (1996, 2000, 2006, 2010). Head coach of the Russian national team - winner of the first World Rinkball Championship (1998, Omsk).

From 2017, he was the head coach of the youth and national floor ball teams of Russia, and Head coach of the floorball team "Sibir" in Omsk Oblast.

He died on 11 June 2026, aged 80.
