= Ivan Nikulin (politician) =

Russian politician (1936–2026)

- Иван Никулин

Member of the Soviet of the Union
- In office 1984–1989

Personal details
- Born: 10 July 1936 Bryansk Oblast, Russian SFSR, Soviet Union
- Died: 3 February 2026 (aged 89)
- Party: CPSU
- Education: Leningrad Agricultural Institute
- Occupation: Economist

Ivan Ivanovich Nikulin (Russian: Иван Иванович Никулин; 10 July 1936 – 3 February 2026) was a Russian politician. A member of the Communist Party of the Soviet Union, he served in the Soviet of the Union from 1984 to 1989.

Nikulin died on 3 February 2026, at the age of 89.
