= 2026 Krasnodar mall attack =

2026 mall attack in Krasnodar, Russia

Coordinates: 45.08603245497138°N 38.90255000882872°E

- Location: West Mall, Krasnodar, Krasnodar Krai, Russia
- Date: 20 June 2026; 4 months ago c. 14:00 (MSK; UTC+03:00)
- Target: Women at the mall
- Attack type: Mass stabbing; attempted arson; attempted mass murder; homicide
- Weapons: Machete; Homemade firecracker
- Deaths: 1
- Injuries: 6
- Defender: Aleksandr Voevoda
- Motive: Personal problems
- Accused: Grigory Artyushin

On 20 June 2026, a mass stabbing occurred at the West Mall in Krasnodar, Krasnodar Krai, Russia. A 19-year-old man, Grigory Artyushin, was accused of fatally stabbing a woman with a machete and injuring six others.

== Attack ==
According to eyewitnesses, before the attack, the suspect allegedly poured a flammable liquid, trying to start a fire. He was wearing a hoodie with the word "CRIME" on it.

Around 14:00, the suspect entered the shopping mall with a machete. Behind his back, he had a backpack with a homemade firecracker. The suspect allegedly set it off near the entrance. A security guard tried to stop the attacker, but the attacker stabbed him in the chest with the machete.

The suspect then allegedly entered the MFC (multi-purpose government services center) on the ground floor and began slashing visitors with the machete. The victims sustained knife wounds and shrapnel injuries from the explosion. One woman died at the scene, and six other people were hospitalized.

The suspect ran up to the third floor, approaching a restaurant and a children's play area. Local residents subdued and detained him. He was pinned to the floor and bound with belts. According to witnesses, the attacker stated that he was tired of life, and had also shouted about revenge.

== Aftermath ==
The Investigative Committee has opened a criminal case under Article 105 of the Criminal Code of the Russian Federation (murder) and Part 3 of Article 30, Article 105 of the Criminal Code of the Russian Federation (attempted murder).

Aleksandr Voevoda, who neutralized the attacker, is set to receive the 14th annual Tigran Keosayan Prize, worth 1 million rubles.

West Mall was closed until further notice.

== Suspect ==
The suspect was identified as 19-year-old Grigory Artyushin. Artyushin was born in Tula and worked at a home improvement store. A few days before the incident, he had been voicing suicidal thoughts.

Artyushin had no prior criminal record and had moved to the city to find work after graduating from a technical college. In 2016, he was diagnosed with infantile personality disorder. Artyushin has been ordered to undergo a forensic psychiatric evaluation. Artyushin faces up to life imprisonment.

Artyushin lived with his mother, two sisters, and a brother. His mother raised all four children by herself. His father died in 2023. The mother, Yulia, works in a hospital.

Artyushin told journalists that he is interested in mass murders and listened to the music of the American metal band Cannibal Corpse.

=== Legal proceedings ===
The court sent Artyushin to a detention centre until 20 August 2026.

== Victims ==
One person, a 41-year-old dentist, was killed. Six people were injured, including a security guard, who suffered severe injuries to his chest.
