= Metropolis of Crimea =

Church in Simferopol, Russia

Crimean Metropolia
- Крымская Митрополия
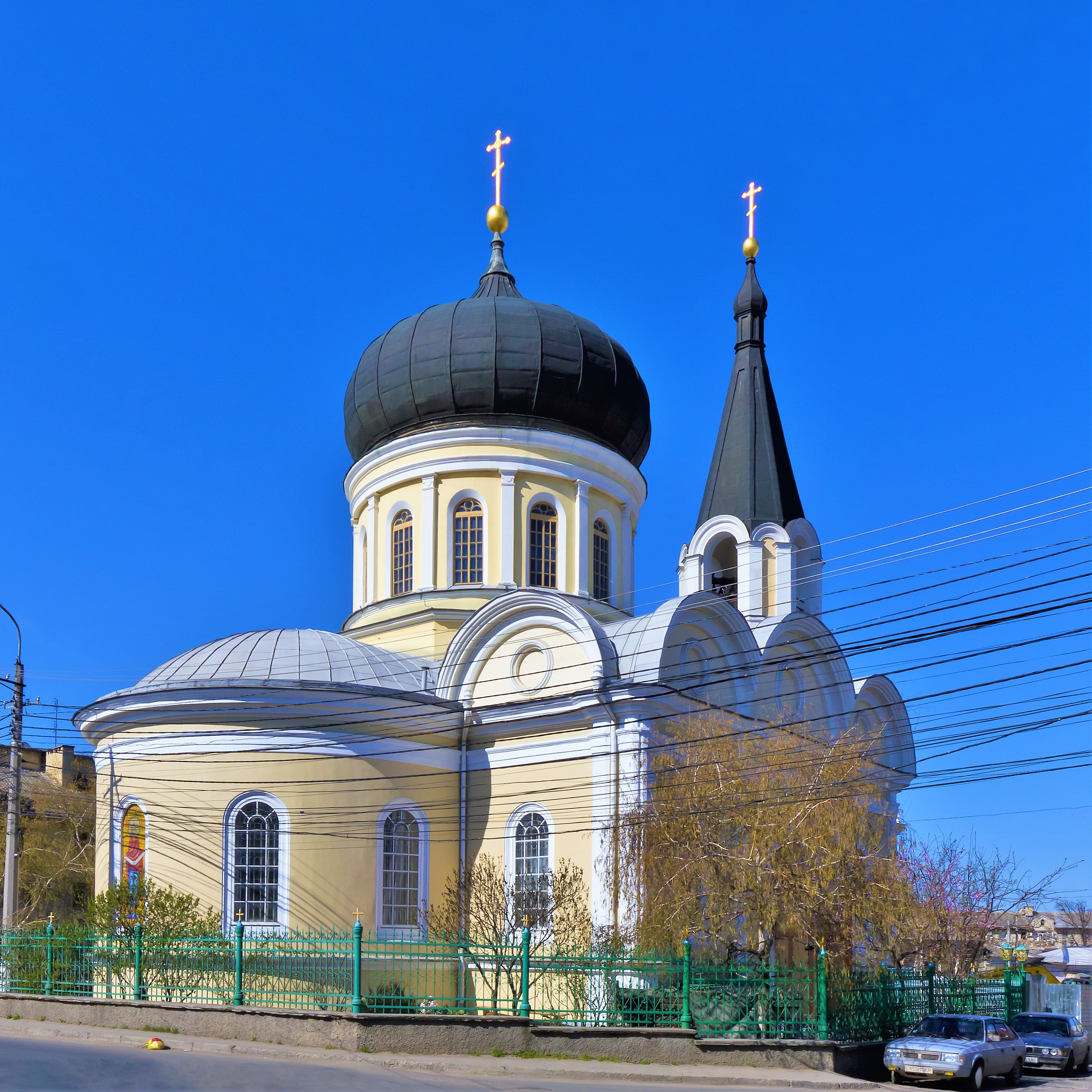
- Location: Simferopol, Russia
- Country: Russia

Metropolis of Crimea is a Metropolitanate of the Russian Orthodox Church in Crimea.

== History ==
It was founded on June 7, 2022, by the decision of the Holy Synod of the Russian Orthodox Church with the territory of the occupied Autonomous Republic of Crimea and Sevastopol. The Russian Orthodox Church illegally incorporated Dzhankoi into the Crimean Metropolitanate, Simferopol, and Theodosiya dioceses, which are part of the Ukrainian Orthodox Church of the Moscow Patriarchate.
