= Slobodskoy Uyezd =

Slobodskoy Uyezd (Слободской уезд) was one of the subdivisions of the Vyatka Governorate of the Russian Empire. It was situated in the northern part of the governorate. Its administrative centre was Slobodskoy.

== Demographics ==
At the time of the Russian Empire Census of 1897, Slobodskoy Uyezd had a population of 213,650. Of these, 95.0% spoke Russian, 2.9% Udmurt and 2.0% Tatar as their native language.
