= Pavel Syutkin (military officer) =

Soviet military leader, artilleryman and colonel (1922–2026)

- Павел Сюткин
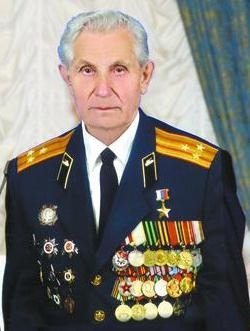
- Syutkin receiving the Gold Star Medal at the Kremlin in 2008
- Born: 19 June 1922; Zapolena, Slobodskoy Uyezd, Vyatka Governorate, Russian SFSR
- Died: 10 August 2026 (aged 104); Sochi, Krasnodar Krai, Russia
- Alma mater: Military Logistics Academy
- Military career
- Allegiance: USSR
- Branch: Red Army
- Service years: 1942–1969
- Rank: Colonel
- Unit: 373rd Separate Guards Twice Red Banner Order of Kutuzov Idritsky Heavy Self-Propelled Artillery Regiment of the Supreme High Command Reserve
- Commands: Su-152 battery
- Battles/Wars: World War II; Eastern Front
- Awards: Hero of the Russian Federation; Order of Honour; Order of the Red Banner; Order of Alexander Nevsky; Order of the Patriotic War; Order of the Red Star; Medal of Zhukov; Medal "For Battle Merit"

Pavel Pavlovich Syutkin (Russian: Павел Павлович Сюткин; 19 June 1922 – 10 August 2026) was a Soviet military leader, artilleryman and colonel. He received the Hero of the Russian Federation award on March 7, 2008.

== Biography ==
=== Early life ===
Syutkin was born on 19 June 1922, in the village of Zapolena, in the Slobodskoy Uyezd of Vyatka Governorate. He spent his childhood in the village of Bobino, Slobodskoy District, Kirov Oblast, and was brought up by a single mother along with another sibling. He began his studies at a rural school. In 1932, his family moved to Tyumen, where he received further education.

From 1939 to 1941, Syutkin worked as a sailor of the Oryol tug of the Tyumen river port and the Ob-Yenisei river expedition. From 1941 to 1942, he worked at the Tyumen plant No. 762 "Mechanic" (now known as the Tyumen Machine Tool Plant).

=== Second World War ===
In September 1942, Syutkin volunteered to join the Red Army, and was first sent to Bryansk. He fought in the 1539th heavy self-propelled artillery regiment as the commander of a SU-152 assault gun, and later moved to command the battery of self-propelled guns of the 373rd Guards heavy self-propelled artillery Idritsky Twice Red Banner Order of Kutuzov Regiment of the 3rd Belorussian Front.

Syutkin was awarded for the exemplary performance and courage during Soviet offensives that ended with the recapture of Daugavpils and Rēzekne. He received awards twice more later, once during the breakthrough of the German defenses in East Prussia, and another time in capturing the fortress of Pillau.

During the span of the East Prussian offensive, Syutkin's battery destroyed 9 tanks, 10 armored personnel carriers, 12 artillery pieces, 8 six-barreled mortars, 10 bunkers, and around 500 Nazi soldiers in total.

He was twice (1945 and 1946) nominated for the title of Hero of the Soviet Union, but the award was never given due to an error in the documents.

=== After the war ===
After the war ended, Syutkin continued his service in the army. In 1951, he graduated from the Military Logistics Academy, after which he served in various positions. His last position in the military was the deputy division commander for rear. After retiring, he moved to and lived in Estonia. In 1992, he sold his apartment in Estonia, moved to the Russian Federation and invested in shared construction. He was deceived, left homeless and lived in a gatehouse for three years while relying on begging for a living. In 1995, at the invitation of relatives, he moved to the city of Sochi, where for the next 14 years he lived on the balcony of a rented apartment.

Syutkin repeatedly asked the government to confer him the Gold Star Medal for his contribution in the war. In this effort he wrote to the Ministry of Defense, the Main Directorate of Personnel, the army's Central Archive, and other authorities, but received no answer. Later, a group of veterans of the Great Patriotic War sent a letter directly to the President of Russia with a request to personally look into this situation.

By the decree of the President of Russia on 7 March 2008, Syutkin was awarded the title of Hero of the Russian Federation for his contribution six decades ago. On 29 April of the same year, on the eve of the celebration of the 63rd anniversary of the Great Victory, Russian President Vladimir Putin presented Syutkin with the Gold Star Medal at the Kremlin.

In 2009, he received a new apartment from the state. He turned 100 on 19 June 2022, and died in Sochi on 10 August 2026, at the age of 104.
