= Eduard Apalkov =

Russian footballer (1970–2026)

Personal information
- Date of birth: 30 January 1970
- Place of birth: Stavropol, Russian SFSR, USSR
- Date of death: 7 March 2026 (aged 56)
- Height: 1.76 m (5 ft 9 in)
- Position: Defender

Youth career
- Dynamo Stavropol

Senior career*
Years	Team	Apps	(Gls)
1987	Avtopritsep Stavropol	6	(0)
1988–1989	Dynamo Stavropol	3	(0)
1989–1991	Signal Izobilny	58	(1)
1992	Dynamo Stavropol	12	(0)
1992	Asmaral Kislovodsk	15	(0)
1992–1993	Chemik Police	16	(2)
1993–1994	Stilon Gorzów Wielkopolski	17	(0)
1994	B36 Tórshavn	17	(5)
1995	Bobruisk	8	(0)
1996–1997	Belshina Bobruisk	48	(1)
1997–1998	Vityaz Shpakovskoye		
1999	Signal Izobilny	2	(0)
2001	Torpedo Armavir	18	(0)
- * Club domestic league appearances and goals

Eduard Ivanovich Apalkov (Russian: Эдуард Иванович Апальков; 30 January 1970 – 7 March 2026) was a Russian footballer who played as a defender. He died on 7 March 2026, at the age of 56.
