= 2026 in music =

This topic covers events and articles related to 2026 in music.

== Specific locations ==
- African music
- American music
- British music
- Canadian music
- Japanese music
- Nordic music
- Philippine music
- South Korean music

== Specific genres ==
- Country
- Heavy metal
- Hip-hop
- Latin
- R&B
- Rock
- Jazz
- K-pop
- J-pop

== Bands formed ==
- Alpha Drive One
- And2ble
- Daily:Direction
- DK X Seungkwan
- Dodree
- Drippin
- Hiipe Princess
- Keyveatz
- Latency
- Lngshot
- NCT JNJM
- OWIS
- Unchild
- WAYF Boys
- Yuhz

== Bands reformed ==
- Ben Folds Five
- Florida Georgia Line
- I.O.I
- Little Angels
- The Pussycat Dolls

== Awards ==
68th Annual Grammy Awards (USA)
Record of the Year: "Luther" by Kendrick Lamar and SZA • Album of the Year: Debí Tirar Más Fotos by Bad Bunny • Song of the Year: "Wildflower" by Billie Eilish • Best New Artist: Olivia Dean
2026 Brit Awards (UK)
British Album of the Year: The Art of Loving by Olivia Dean • Song of the Year: "Rein Me In" by Sam Fender and Olivia Dean • British Artist of the Year: Olivia Dean • British Breakthrough Artist: Lola Young • British Group: Wolf Alice
Juno Awards of 2026 (Canada)
Artist of the Year: Tate McRae • Group of the Year: The Beaches • Album of the Year: So Close to What by Tate McRae • Single of the Year: "Sports Car" by Tate McRae • Breakthrough Artist or Group of the Year: Cameron Whitcomb
40th Golden Disc Awards (South Korea)
Album of the Year: Karma by Stray Kids • Song of the Year: "Home Sweet Home" by G-Dragon featuring Taeyang and Daesung • Artist of the Year: Jennie • Rookie Artist of the Year: AllDay Project, Cortis

== Bands disbanded ==
- Amefurasshi
- BXB
- CIX
- DKZ
- E'Last
- The Hollies
- Maddie & Tae
- Naked Eyes
- NOMAD
- Sepultura
- Steely Dan
- Svalbard
- Tokyo Girls' Style
- Ukka
- Venom
- White Reaper

== Deaths ==
=== January ===
- 2
  - Ritva Auvinen, 93, Finnish opera singer.
  - Tony Carr, 98, Maltese session drummer and percussionist (CCS, Hot Chocolate).
  - Johnny Legend, 77, American rockabilly musician
- 5
  - Andrew Bodnar, 71, English bass guitarist (The Rumour) and songwriter ("I Love the Sound of Breaking Glass"). (death announced on this date)
  - Andrew Carter, 86, English composer and conductor
  - Mike Embro, 63, Canadian drummer (Razor) (death announced on this date)
  - Elsje de Wijn, 82, Dutch actress and singer
- 6 – Jim McBride, 78, American country music songwriter ("Chasin' That Neon Rainbow", "(Who Says) You Can't Have It All", "Chattahoochee")
- 7
  - James Bernard, American music journalist and magazine editor (The Source, XXL) (death announced on this date)
  - Ihor Blazhkov, 89, Ukrainian conductor
- 8
  - Dave Hitchcock, 76, English record producer (In the Land of Grey and Pink, Foxtrot, The Snow Goose) and accountant.
  - Guy Moon, 63, American television composer (The Fairly OddParents, Danny Phantom, Big Time Rush), traffic collision.
- 9
  - Dieudonné Larose, 80, Haitian singer
  - Terry Sullivan, 87, British drummer (Renaissance)
- 10
  - Yeison Jiménez, 34, Colombian singer, plane crash
  - Bob Weir, 78, American Hall of Fame musician (Grateful Dead) and songwriter ("Sugar Magnolia", "One More Saturday Night"), complications from cancer
- 11
  - Prashant Tamang, 43, Indian singer (Indian Idol), cardiac arrest
  - John Wallace, 76, Scottish trumpeter, composer and arts educator
- 12
  - Sheila Bernette, 94, English singer (The Good Old Days, The Black and White Minstrel Show)
  - Matt Kwasniewski-Kelvin, 26, British guitarist (Black Midi) (death announced on this date)
- 13 – Seán Ó Sé, 89, Irish tenor singer
- 14
  - Melania Pérez, 76, Argentine singer.
  - Quemil Yambay, 87, Paraguayan musician and composer.
- 15
  - Raju Bandara, 65, Sri Lankan singer, kidney disease.
  - Kenny Morris, 68, English drummer (Siouxsie and the Banshees). (death announced on this date)
  - Rubén Patagonia, 69, Argentine singer.
- 16
  - Tony Dallara, 89, Italian singer ("Come Prima", "Romantica"), respiratory illness.
  - Osvaldo Díaz, 76, Chilean singer.
  - Joxean Llorente, 63, Spanish choral conductor, composer and musicologist.
  - Marcel Osztas, 37, Slovak radio presenter and music concert host.
  - Guillermo Rendón García, 90, Colombian composer and organist.
- 17
  - Marikena Monti, 82, Argentine singer and actress.
  - Tucker Zimmerman, 84, American singer-songwriter, smoke inhalation.
- 18
  - Stephen "Cat" Coore, 69, Jamaican guitarist and cellist (Third World).
  - Anders Möller, 63, Swedish musician (Black Ingvars, Swedish Erotica), cancer.
  - Jaan Ross, 68, Estonian musicologist and psychologist.
  - Ralph Towner, 85, American jazz multi-instrumentalist.
- 19
  - Mojmír Maděrič, 70, Czech musician, actor and host.
  - Billy Parker, 88, American country music singer and DJ.
- 20
  - Rob Hirst, 70, Australian musician (Midnight Oil, Ghostwriters) and songwriter ("Forgotten Years"), pancreatic cancer. (death announced on this date)
  - Yaw Sarpong, Ghanaian gospel musician and songwriter.
- 22
  - Francis Buchholz, 71, German bass guitarist (Scorpions).
  - Guy Hovis, 84, American singer (The Lawrence Welk Show).
- 23
  - Dalibor Brun, 81, Croatian singer.
  - Kristinn Svavarsson, 78, Icelandic saxophonist (Mezzoforte). (death announced on this date)
- 24 – Yuri Rymanov, 69, Russian guitarist (Lyube).
- 25
  - Gabe Lopez, 49, American songwriter and producer, lymphoma.
  - Abhijit Majumdar, 54, Indian composer and music director (Sasura Ghara Zindabad, Balunga Toka, Daha Balunga), liver disease.
  - Marie Rouanet, 89, French singer and writer.
  - Lucky Widja, 49, Indonesian singer and songwriter, kidney tuberculosis.
- 26
  - Richie Beirach, 78, American jazz pianist and composer.
  - Sly Dunbar, 73, Jamaican drummer (Sly and Robbie), record producer ("Underneath It All"), and songwriter ("Murder She Wrote").
  - Béla Lattmann, 60, Hungarian jazz bassist.
- 27
  - António Chainho, 88, Portuguese fado guitarist.
  - Vladislav Chernushenko, 90, Russian conductor.
- 28
  - Maroochy Barambah, 70, Australian Turrbal elder and mezzo-soprano singer.
  - Nilton César, 86, Brazilian singer.
  - Bryan Loren, 59, American songwriter ("Do the Bartman"). (death announced on this date)
- 29 – Wojciech Michniewski, 78, Polish composer and conductor. (death announced on this date)
- 30
  - Abdelhadi Belkhayat, 85, Moroccan singer.
  - Parthenon Huxley, 70, American musician (ELO Part II).
  - Fatih Ürek, 59, Turkish singer and actor, complications from a heart attack.
- 31
  - Miklós Fenyő, 78, Hungarian singer, songwriter and musician.
  - Mingo Lewis, 72, American percussionist and drummer (Santana, Al Di Meola, The Tubes). (death announced on this date)
  - Billy Bass Nelson, 75, American Hall of Fame bass guitarist (Parliament-Funkadelic).

=== February ===
- 1
  - Fernando Esteso, 80, Spanish singer, comedian, and actor, respiratory failure.
  - Steve Washington, 67, American musician (Slave, Aurra). (death announced on this date)
- 2
  - Chuck Negron, 83, American singer (Three Dog Night), heart failure and COPD.
  - Ken Peplowski, 66, American jazz clarinetist and tenor saxophonist.
  - Yuan Wei-jen, 57, Taiwanese singer-songwriter.
- 3
  - Ron Kenoly, 81, American Christian singer, worship leader, and songwriter.
  - Lamonte McLemore, 90, American singer (The 5th Dimension).
  - S. P. Venkatesh, 70, Indian film score composer (Kilukkam, Spadikam, Rajavinte Makan), cardiac arrest.
- 4
  - François Beukelaers, 88, Belgian singer, actor and stage director.
  - Tommy Crook, 81, American guitarist.
  - Tōsha Meishō, 84, Japanese hayashi musician.
- 5
  - Helen Micallef, 75, Maltese singer (Helen and Joseph).
  - Fred Smith, 77, American bassist (Television, Blondie).
  - Tamás Vásáry, 92, Hungarian pianist and conductor.
- 6 – Lynn Blakey, American musician (Tres Chicas, Let's Active).
- 7
  - Brad Arnold, 47, American singer (3 Doors Down) and songwriter ("Kryptonite", "Here Without You"), renal cell carcinoma.
  - Greg Brown, 56, American musician (Cake, Deathray) and songwriter ("The Distance").
  - Ebo Taylor, 90, Ghanaian musician and producer.
- 8 – Matti Caspi, 76, Israeli singer-songwriter, cancer.
- 9 – Garland Green, 83, American soul singer and pianist.
- 10
  - Des de Moor, 64, English writer and musician. (death announced on this date)
  - Andrew Ranken, 72, English drummer (The Pogues).
- 11
  - Jerry Kennedy, 85, American record producer, songwriter and guitarist.
  - Helmuth Rilling, 92, German choral conductor (Gächinger Kantorei, Oregon Bach Festival, Internationale Bachakademie Stuttgart).
  - László Somfai, 91, Hungarian musicologist.
- 12
  - Saúl Cornejo, 79, Peruvian singer and composer (We All Together).
  - Milkman, 36, Mexican rapper, producer, and composer.
  - Michel Portal, 90, French composer, saxophonist and clarinetist.
- 13 – Simon Harris, 63, British music producer, DJ and electronic musician.
- 14 – Tim Very, 42, American rock drummer (Manchester Orchestra). (death announced on this date)
- 15
  - Wayne Proctor, American guitarist (We the People).
  - Leo Rosas, 27, Bolivian singer (The Voice of Mexico).
- 16
  - Marzio Mazzanti, Italian singer and bassist (Homo Sapiens).
  - Billy Steinberg, 75, American songwriter ("Like a Virgin", "True Colors", "Eternal Flame"), cancer.
- 17
  - Jim Čert, 69, Czech singer and accordionist.
  - Ray Reach, 77, American musician, composer and convicted pedophile.
  - Shinya, 56, Japanese musician (Luna Sea), cancer.
  - José van Dam, 85, Belgian operatic bass-baritone.
  - Veikko Virtanen, 97, Finnish organ builder.
- 18
  - Béatrice Ardisson, 62, French composer, cancer.
  - Lil Poppa, 25, American rapper, suicide by gunshot.
- 19 – Nikolai Komyagin, 39, Russian singer (Shortparis).
- 20 – Zoya Dorodova, 85, Russian singer (Buranovskiye Babushki), cancer.
- 21
  - John Bertalot, 94, English organist.
  - Willie Colón, 75, American salsa musician ("Pedro Navaja"), respiratory failure.
  - Mark Kennedy, 74, Australian drummer (Spectrum, Ayers Rock, Marcia Hines) and record producer.
- 22 – Luci4, 23, American rapper.
- 23
  - Oliver "Power" Grant, 52, American executive producer (Wu-Tang Clan).
  - Sondra Lee, 97, American musical actress (Hello, Dolly!, Peter Pan, Sunday in New York) and singer.
  - Éliane Radigue, 94, French composer.
  - Monti Rock III, 86, American singer (Disco-Tex and the Sex-O-Lettes), complications from COPD.
- 24
  - Rostislav Gepp, 74, Russian musician (Ariel).
  - Jiří Valenta, 66, Czech keyboardist (Olympic), suicide.
  - Héctor Zamorano, 47, Mexican singer (La Academia).
- 25 – Roman Kofman, 89, Ukrainian conductor (Kyiv Chamber Orchestra) and composer.
- 26 – Utsav Charan Das, 80, Indian dancer, lyricist and music composer.
- 27
  - Neil Sedaka, 86, American singer ("Breaking Up Is Hard to Do", "Bad Blood") and songwriter ("Love Will Keep Us Together").
  - Travis Wammack, 81, American rock and roll guitarist.
- 28
  - John P. Hammond, 83, American blues singer and guitarist.
  - Boncana Maïga, 77, Malian composer and musician.
  - Viktor Vassiljev, 71, Estonian guitarist.
  - Terry Watkinson, 85, Canadian musician (Max Webster).

=== March ===
- 1
  - Bob Power, 74, American record producer and audio engineer.
  - J. Strauss, Swedish singer and musician (Morlocks).
  - Gary Walker, 83, American musician (The Standells, The Walker Brothers).
- 2
  - Len Garry, 84, English musician (The Quarrymen), pneumonia.
  - Mike Vernon, 81, English record producer ("Albatross", "Hocus Pocus"), music executive and recording studio owner (Chipping Norton Recording Studios).
- 3
  - Roy Book Binder, 82, American blues musician.
  - Gustav Gunsenheimer, 91, German composer and church music director.
  - Zsolt Kerestely, 91, Romanian composer and conductor.
- 4 – Bernard Rands, 92, British-born American composer.
- 5
  - Jacques Michel, 84, Canadian musician and songwriter.
  - Mihail Secichin, 82, Moldovan pianist, director of Maria Bieșu National Opera and Ballet Theatre (1990–1992).
  - Lee Turner, 89, American musician (The Dream Weavers).
- 6 – Franco Vito Gaiezza, 66, Italian musician and writer, heart attack.
- 7
  - Vidi Aldiano, 35, Indonesian singer-songwriter, kidney cancer.
  - David Brigati, 85, American singer (Joey Dee and the Starliters, The Rascals).
  - Donny Fattah, 76, Indonesian bassist (God Bless) and songwriter, sarcopenia, vascular blockage, and autoimmune diseases.
  - Walter Martino, 72, Italian drummer (Goblin).
  - Country Joe McDonald, 84, American singer (Country Joe and the Fish) and songwriter ("I-Feel-Like-I'm-Fixin'-to-Die Rag").
  - Augie Meyers, 85, American musician (Sir Douglas Quintet, Texas Tornados).
- 8
  - Zeph Ellis, 37, British rapper.
  - Dilworth Karaka, 75, New Zealand musician (Herbs) and songwriter ("Sensitive to a Smile").
  - Mantana Morakul, 102, Thai singer and actress.
  - Shane Rout, 53, Australian drummer (Blood Duster).
- 9
  - Tommy DeCarlo, 60, American singer (Boston),
  - Blake Emmons, 81, Canadian country singer.
  - Gabba, British guitarist (Chaos UK).
- 10
  - Willie Anthony Waters, 74, American opera conductor and artistic director (Connecticut Opera). (death announced on this date)
  - Zalek, 30, Colombian reggaeton singer.
- 12
  - Hjálmar H. Ragnarsson, 73, Icelandic composer.
  - Iulian Vrabete, 70, Romanian bassist (Holograf), cancer.
- 13
  - Phil Campbell, 64, Welsh guitarist (Motörhead, Persian Risk, Phil Campbell and the Bastard Sons).
  - Fatma Sarhan, 97–98, Egyptian singer.
- 14 – Paul Geremia, 81, American blues musician.
- 15
  - Irmeli Mäkelä, 83, Finnish pop singer.
  - Cinzia Oscar, 63, Italian singer.
- 16
  - Dolores Keane, 72, Irish folk singer (De Dannan).
  - Wayne Perkins, 74, American guitarist, stroke.
- 17
  - Dominika Elischerová, 23, Czech singer.
  - Bettina Köster, 66, German singer, musician and composer.
  - Rainelle Krause, 37, American soprano.
- 18 – Robert White, 89, American tenor.
- 19 – Terry Cox, 89, British drummer (Pentangle, The Humblebums).
- 20
  - Aref, 84, Iranian pop singer.
  - Louie Louie, 63, American singer ("Sittin' in the Lap of Luxury").
  - Richard Phillips, 85, British music promoter.
- 17
  - Daniel Buira, 54, Argentine drummer (Los Piojos).
  - Steve Houben, 76, Belgian jazz saxophonist and flutist.
- 22
  - Ronnie Bowman, 64, American bluegrass guitarist and singer-songwriter
  - Sylvia Kersenbaum, 84, Argentine pianist, composer and teacher.
- 23
  - Jerry Dee Lewis, American rapper (The Cold Crush Brothers).
  - Shinichiro Sato, 61, Japanese rock drummer (The Pillows), esophageal cancer
  - Chip Taylor, 86, American singer and songwriter ("Angel of the Morning", "Wild Thing").
- 24
  - Gameboy Tetris, 40, Estonian rapper (5miinust), suicide.
  - Gino Paoli, 91, Italian singer-songwriter ("Il cielo in una stanza", "Senza fine", "Sapore di sale") and politician, deputy (1987–1992).
- 25
  - Dash Crofts, 87, American soft rock singer-songwriter and multi-instrumentalist (Seals & Crofts)
  - Mick Roberts, 57, English singer (The Bridewell Taxis).
- 26
  - Ahmad Kaabour, 70, Lebanese singer.
  - Ross the Boss, 72, American guitarist (Manowar, The Dictators), ALS.
- 27
  - Jon Dee Graham, 67, American musician (The Skunks, True Believers).
  - Mahbuba Rahman, 91, Bangladeshi playback singer (Mukh O Mukhosh, The Day Shall Dawn).
- 28
  - DJ Dan, 57, American house music DJ and producer, heart attack.
  - Matt Krupanski, American drummer (BoySetsFire).
  - Marinella, 87, Greek pop singer.
- 29
  - Greg Elmore, 79, American drummer (Quicksilver Messenger Service, The Brogues).
  - Volodymyr Komarov, 62, Ukrainian musician.
  - David Riondino, 73, Italian singer-songwriter.
  - Williametta Spencer, 98, American composer and musicologist.
- 30
  - Carl Bonafede, 85, American music manager (The Buckinghams, Daughters of Eve) and musician.
  - Walt Maddox, 88, American singer (The Marcels).
  - Mykhailo Matsialko, 79, Ukrainian singer.
  - Christopher North, 75, American keyboardist (Ambrosia), throat cancer.
  - Tony Rivers, 85, English singer (Harmony Grass).
  - Michelangelo Zurletti, 89, Italian musicologist and essayist.
- 31 – Bill Leader, 96, English record producer (Hearken to the Witches Rune) and engineer.

=== April ===
- 1
  - Kiril Ampov, 77, Bulgarian composer and pop singer.
  - Fuze, 46, Russian rapper (KREC), traffic collision.
  - Suki Lahav, 74, Israeli violinist (E Street Band), singer, and lyricist.
  - Dalia Nausheen, 71, Bangladeshi Nazrul Sangeet singer.
- 2
  - James Gadson, 86, American drummer (Charles Wright & the Watts 103rd Street Rhythm Band) and session musician.
  - Bo Lueders, 38, American guitarist (Harm's Way).
  - Fernando Ríos Palacio, 87, Argentine singer.
- 3
  - Wojciech Morawski, 76, Polish drummer (Breakout).
  - Andrew Perry, 60, English music journalist (Select, Q, Mojo).
  - Fred Simon, 74, American singer (The Lost Generation, The Chi-Lites). (death announced on this date)
- 4 – Sajida Obaed, 68, Iraqi folk singer.
- 5
  - Alvin L, 67, Brazilian singer-songwriter.
  - Donn Landee, 79, American record producer (5150) and recording engineer (Minute by Minute, 1984). (death announced on this date)
  - Albert Mazibuko, 77, South African choral singer (Ladysmith Black Mambazo).
  - David Wiffen, 84, English–Canadian folk singer-songwriter ("Driving Wheel").
- 6
  - Mihail Belchev, 79, Bulgarian singer-songwriter.
  - Blondy, 66, American rapper (The Sequence) and songwriter ("Funk You Up").
  - Álvaro Cassuto, 87, Portuguese composer and conductor.
- 9
  - Afrika Bambaataa, 68, American DJ and rapper.
  - Björgvin Halldórsson, 74, Icelandic musician.
  - Ray Monette, 79, American musician (Rare Earth).
- 10
  - Dinah Christie, 83, Canadian singer and actress.
  - Harry Kim, 74, American trumpeter (The Phenix Horns).
- 11
  - Mike Westbrook, 90, English jazz pianist and composer.
  - Václav Hybš, 90, Czech musician, trumpeter and conductor.
- 12 – Asha Bhosle, 92, Indian playback singer.
- 13
  - Moya Brennan, 73, Irish singer.
  - Patrick Campbell-Lyons, 82, Irish musician (Nirvana) and composer.
  - Al Gunn, Canadian bassist (Men Without Hats).
  - Magsud Mammadov, 96, Azerbaijani ballet dancer.
  - Mister Sam, 80, Argentine music producer (Gretchen).
  - Margret Nikolova, 97, Bulgarian pop singer.
  - Felipe Stait, 64, Argentine guitarist (Enanitos Verdes).
  - Donald K. Tarlton, 82, Canadian music producer and promoter.
- 14 – Dan Wall, 72, American jazz keyboardist.
- 15 – Lucha Moreno, 86, Mexican singer.
- 16
  - Oleg Maisenberg, 80, Ukrainian-born Austrian pianist.
  - Don Schlitz, 73, American songwriter ("The Gambler", "Forever and Ever, Amen", "When You Say Nothing at All").
  - Ernie Smith, 80, Jamaican reggae singer.
- 19 – Dave Mason, 79, English singer-songwriter (Traffic)
- 20
  - Wayne Moss, 88, American session musician and songwriter.
  - Alan Osmond, 76, American singer (The Osmonds).
- 21 – Gregg Foreman, 53, American musician (The Delta 72).
- 22 – Evy, 80, France singer, (Belle Epoque).
- 26 – Nedra Talley, 80, American singer (The Ronettes).
- 27 – Beverley Martyn, 79, English folk singer-songwriter.
- 29 – David Allan Coe, 86, American outlaw country singer-songwriter.
- 30 – Alex Ligertwood, 79, Scottish singer and guitarist (Santana).

=== May ===
- 1 – Georg Wadenius, 80, Swedish guitarist (Blood, Sweat & Tears).
- 8 – Warren Tipton, 67, American R&B singer (The Chi-Lites).
- 13 – Clarence Carter, 90, American R&B singer.
- 16
  - Dennis Locorriere, 76, American musician (Dr. Hook).
  - Totó la Momposina, 85, Colombian singer.
- 22 – Rob Base, 59, American rapper (Rob Base & DJ E-Z Rock).
- 25 – Sonny Rollins, 95, American jazz musician.
- 29 – Lauren Bennett, 36, English singer (Paradiso Girls, G.R.L.).
- 30
  - Joe Negri, 99, American jazz musician.
  - Foster Sylvers, 64, American singer (The Sylvers).

=== June ===
- 2 – Peabo Bryson, 75, American singer.
- 5
  - Indio Solari, 77, Argentine singer (Patricio Rey y sus Redonditos de Ricota).
  - Talay Riley, 35, English singer-songwriter, stabbed.
- 14 – Oliver Tree, 32, American musician, plane crash.
- 15 – Abdullah Ibrahim, 91, South Africa piano musician.
- 17 – Walter Parazaider, 81, American woodwind musician (Chicago).
- 18 – Justin Cary, 50, American bassist (Sixpence None the Richer).
- 19 – Tay Keith, 29, American record producer.
- 22
  - Clive Davis, 94, American record executive, A&R executive and record producer.
  - Guesch Patti, 80, French singer.
- 24 – David Clayton-Thomas, 84, American singer (Blood, Sweat & Tears).
- 25 – Harold Wheeler, 83, American orchestrator and music director.
- 30 – Victor Willis, 74, American singer (Village People).

=== July ===
- 1 – Joe Melson, 91, American singer.
- 2 – Tommy Hunter, 89, Canadian country singer.
- 4 – Roger "B. War" Svensson, 60, Swedish bassist (Marduk).
- 5 – Beaky, 81, English musician (Dave Dee, Dozy, Beaky, Mick & Tich).
- 8 – Bonnie Tyler, 75, Welsh singer.
- 9 – Calvin Hayes, 63, English musician (Johnny Hates Jazz).
- 11 – Peppino di Capri, 86, Italian singer.
- 15 – Plas Johnson, 94, American musician.
- 17 – Freddy Cannon, 89, American rock and roll singer.
- 18
  - Jennifer Finch, 59, American bass guitarist (L7).
  - Jim Gilstrap, 79, American session musician and singer.
- 21 – Brian Doerksen, 60, Canadian singer.
- 23 – William Orbit, 69, English ambient musician.
- 24 – Lou Koller, 59, American singer (Sick of It All).
- 28
  - Glen Hansard, 56, Irish singer (The Frames), traffic collision.
  - Kavinsky, 50, French DJ.
- 31 – Jerney Kaagman, 79, Dutch singer (Earth and Fire).

=== August ===
- 12
  - Gary "Gazza" Johnson, 61, English synth-pop bassist (China Crisis).
  - Darina Laščiaková, 94, Slovak folk singer.
- 16 – Hayden Panettiere, 36, American singer.
- 17 – Frank Beard, 77, American Hall of Fame rock drummer (ZZ Top).
- 22 – Shelley Fabares, 82, American pop singer ("Johnny Angel") and actress.
- 25
  - Dolly Parton, 80, American Hall of Fame country singer.
  - Tim Curry, 80, English singer.
- 29 - Frankie Miller, 95, American country singer.

=== September ===
- 1 - Cassandra Wilson, 70, American jazz singer.
- 5 - Andy Williams, 48, American guitarist (Every Time I Die).
- 14 - Pete Byrne, 74, British singer (Naked Eyes).
- 15 - Rosalind Ashford, 83, American Rock & Roll and National Rhythm & Blues Halls of Fame singer (Martha and the Vandellas).
- 17 - Duncan Sheik, 56, American singer.
- 20 - Chad Gilbert, 45, American rock musician (New Found Glory).
- 21
  - - Rick Sollo, 59, Brazilian singer (Rick & Renner).
  - - Angry Anderson, 79, Australian rock singer (Rose Tattoo).

=== October ===
- 1 - Conrad Lant, 63, English musician (Venom) and songwriter ("In League with Satan", "Bloodlust").
- 2 - Sass Jordan, 65, Canadian rock singer.
- 5 - Freddie Jackson, 70, American R&B singer.
- 13 - Netinho, 60, Brazilian singer.
- 21 - John Anderson, 71, American country singer
