= 2026 in African music =

The following is a list of events and releases that happened in 2026 in African music.

== Events ==
- February 1 – At the 68th Annual Grammy Awards, nominees for the award for Best African Music Performance are Burna Boy, Davido featuring Omah Lay, Eddy Kenzo & Mehran Matin, Ayra Starr featuring Wizkid, and Tyla.
- April 3 – Omah Lay release his second album Clarity of Mind.
- August 14 – Nigerian singer-songwriter, Ayra Starr releases her third studio album titled Starr Girl.

== Albums set to be released ==
- Vusi Mahlasela – Title to be announced
- Tyla – A-Pop
- Omah Lay – Clarity of Mind
- Lloyiso – Never Thought I Could
- Asake – M$ney
- Ayra Starr – Starr Girl

== Deaths ==
- January 20 – Yaw Sarpong, Ghanaian gospel musician and songwriter
- January 30 – Abdelhadi Belkhayat, Moroccan singer, 85
- February 7 – Ebo Taylor, Ghanaian musician and record producer, 90
- May 3 – Hany Shaker, Egyptian singer and actor, 73
- May 8 – Abdelwahab Doukkali, Moroccan composer and musician, 85
- July 3 – Rahel Yohannes, 79, Ethiopian singer and musician
- September 13 – Mohamed Garfi, Tunisian musicologist, composer and conductor, 77
- September 23 – Moses Matovu, Ugandan musician (Afrigo Band), 77

== See also ==
- 2026 in music
