= Tōsha =

Tōsha is a given name. Notable people with the name include:

- Tōsha Meishō (born 1941), Japanese hayashi musician, providing musical accompaniment in the kabuki theatre
- Tōsha Roei (born 1966), Japanese percussionist in the tradition of traditional Japanese drama and dance
- Tōsha Rosen VI (born 1944), Japanese percussionist in the tradition of traditional Japanese dance and drama
- Tosha, a character from Barney & Friends
