= 2026 in Asian music =

== Events ==
- 10 January – Izna and AllDay Project are among the performers at the 40th Golden Disc Awards in Taiwan. G-Dragon wins Digital Daesang and Stray Kids win Album Daesang.
- 31 January – Japanese girl group Tokyo Girls' Style is to disband after celebrating its 15th anniversary.
- 11 February – The 2nd D Awards ceremony is held in South Korea, with Enhypen winning Artist of the Year.
- 23 April – The Metropolitan Opera announces that the government of Saudi Arabia has withdrawn from a previously discussed eight-year agreement intended to provide $200M USD to the company.
- 4 May – Japanese alternative idol girl group ASP disband at the end of their seventeenth tour.

== Albums ==
- Enhypen – The Sin: Vanish (EP; 16 January)
- Joji – Piss in the Wind (6 February)
- MiSaMo – Play (4 February)

== Musical films ==
- Cosmic Princess Kaguya! (Japan), with music by Conisch
- The RajaSaab (India - Telugu), with music by Thaman S.

== Deaths ==
- 11 January – Prashant Tamang, 34, Indian singer and film actor
- 15 January – Raju Bandara, 65, Sri Lankan singer (kidney failure)
- 25 January – Abhijit Majumdar, 54, Indian composer and music director (liver disease)
- 2 February – Yuan Wei-jen, 57, Taiwanese singer-songwriter (brain haemorrhage)
- 4 February – Tōsha Meishō, 84, Japanese hayashi musician
- 15 February – Kazue Sawai, 85, Japanese koto player
- 17 February – Shinya, 56, Japanese rock drummer (cancer)
- 7 March – Vidi Aldiano, 35, Indonesian singer-songwriter (kidney cancer)
- 27 March – Mahbuba Rahman, 91, Bangladeshi playback artist
- 8 March – Mantana Morakul, 102, Thai singer and actress
- 10 March – Thakkali Srinivasan, 72, Indian film director, musician and producer
- 1 April – Dalia Nausheen, 71, Bangladeshi Nazrul Sangeet singer
- 4 April – Sajida Obaed, 68, Iraqi folk singer
- 7 May – James F. Sundah, 70, Indonesian songwriter
- 10 July – Mariazelle Goonetilleke, 68, Sri Lankan singer and musician
- 22 July – Shir-Mohammad Espandar, 98, Iranian donali player
- 12 August
  - Chen Ying-git, 72, Taiwanese singer
  - Iraj, 93, Iranian singer
- 20 August
  - Nanda Malini, 82, Sri Lankan singer
  - Vanessa Rangadhol, 30, Taiwanese vocalist (Sugarpop; fall)
- 21 August – Pranab Patnaik, 88, Indian playback singer
- 22 August – Kaiser, 65, Burmese singer
- 1 September – He Yong, 57, Chinese rock musician
- 4 September – S. R. Janakiraman, 98, Indian Carnatic singer and musicologist
- 14 October – Alpay, 91, Turkish singer
- 22 October – Krishnaraj, 74, Indian playback singer and music director

== See also ==
- 2026 in music
- 2026 in Japanese music
- 2026 in South Korean music
