= Rainelle =

Rainelle could refer to:

- Rainelle Krause, American opera singer
- Rainelle, West Virginia, U.S., a town
