= 2026 in Asia =

This is a list of events that will take or have taken place In Asia in 2026.

== Events ==
=== January ===
- 7 – 25 January – 2026 AFC U-23 Asian Cup
- 8 January – Thongloun Sisoulith is re-elected as the General Secretary of the Lao People's Revolutionary Party at the 12th Central Committee's first meeting.
- 9 January – 2025–2026 Southern Yemen campaign: The Southern Transitional Council announces its dissolution following territorial losses, including its capital Aden.
- 23 January – Tô Lâm is re-elected as the General Secretary of the Communist Party of Vietnam at the 14th National Congress.
- 25 January – 2025–26 Myanmar general election (third phase)
- 27 January – The India–European Union Free Trade Agreement is signed after nearly two decades of negotiations, eliminating tariffs on a broad range of products and services between the two regions.
- 27 January–7 February – 2026 AFC Futsal Asian Cup

=== February ===
- 7 February – The 2026 Men's T20 World Cup held in India and Sri Lanka begins.
- 8 February –
  - 2026 Japanese general election: Incumbent Prime Minister Sanae Takaichi wins a landslide victory, securing a supermajority in the House of Representatives.
  - 2026 Thai general election and constitutional referendum: Incumbent Prime Minister Anutin Charnvirakul wins a plurality in the House of Representatives, and the referendum to begin drafting a new constitution passes.
- 12 February –
  - 2026 Bangladeshi general election: Bangladesh Nationalist Party wins a two-thirds majority in the Jatiya Sangsad.
  - 2026 Bangladeshi constitutional referendum: A motion to approve the July Charter passes with 60.26% of the vote.
- 22 February –
  - Kim Jong Un is re-elected as the General Secretary of the Workers' Party of Korea at the 9th National Congress.
  - The 2026 Laotian parliamentary election is held.
- 26 February – 2026 Afghanistan–Pakistan war: The government of Pakistan declares "open war" against the Taliban in Afghanistan.
- 28 February – 2026 Iran war: Israel and the United States launch attacks on Iran, killing many high-profile officials, including Supreme Leader Ali Khamenei. Iran launches retaliatory strikes against Israel, as well as against US military bases in the Persian Gulf, and closes the Strait of Hormuz by attacking vessels that try to pass.

=== March ===
- 2 March – 2026 Lebanon war: Hezbollah begins launching strikes against Israel in retaliation for the assassination of Iranian Supreme Leader Ali Khamenei.
- 5 March – 2026 Nepalese general election: The Rastriya Swatantra Party led by Balen Shah wins a landslide victory.
- 8 March
  - 2026 Iranian supreme leader election: Mojtaba Khamenei, the son of Ali Khamenei, is selected as the third Supreme Leader of Iran.
  - India beats New Zealand in the 2026 Men's T20 World Cup final and secures its third title.
- 15 March
  - 2026 Kazakh constitutional referendum: The new Constitution of Kazakhstan is accepted with 90% in favor.
  - 2026 North Korean parliamentary election: General Secretary Kim Jong Un's Workers' Party wins a landslide majority in the Supreme People's Assembly.
  - 2026 Vietnamese legislative election: The Communist Party led by General Secretary Tô Lâm wins almost all the seats in the National Assembly.
- 16 March – 2026 Kabul hospital airstrike: At least 400 people are killed and more than 250 injured in Pakistani airstrikes on a hospital in Kabul, Afghanistan.
- 17 March – 2026 Iran war: Ali Larijani, the Secretary of the Supreme National Security Council, is assassinated by an Israeli airstrike.

=== April ===
- 3 April – 2026 Myanmar presidential election: Min Aung Hlaing is elected as 11th President of Myanmar. Nyo Saw as First Vice-President and Nan Ni Ni Aye as Second Vice President are elected respectively.
- 7 April
  - 2026 Vietnamese presidential election: The National Assembly of Vietnam elects General Secretary Tô Lâm as the new president of Vietnam, replacing Lương Cường.
  - 2026 Iran war: Following an ultimatum from Trump regarding the Strait of Hormuz, the United States and Iran agree on a two-week ceasefire.
- 16 April – 2026 Lebanon war: A US-brokered 10-day ceasefire takes effect between Israel and Lebanon, following ambassador-level talks in the White House.

=== May ===
- 1 May – The United Arab Emirates leaves OPEC, ending six decades of membership and removing one of the organization's largest oil producers.
- 4 May – An explosion at a fireworks factory in Liuyang, Hunan, China kills 37 people and injures 51 others.
- 15 May – Gaza war: An Israeli strike assassinates Izz al-Din al-Haddad, commander of the Izz al-Din al-Qassam Brigades and leader of Hamas in the Gaza Strip.
- 22 May – A gas explosion at the Liushenyu coal mine in Shanxi, China kills 82 people.

== See also ==
- 2026 in Asian music
- List of state leaders in 2026 § Asia
