= Guillermo Rendón =

Guillermo Rendón may refer to:

- Guillermo Rendón García (1935–2026), Colombian composer
- Guillermo Rendón Gómez, Mexican politician, member of the LXVI Legislature of the Mexican Congress
- Guillermo Rendón (footballer)
