= Tōsha Roei =

Tōsha Roei 藤舎呂英
- Born: 1966 (age 59–60)
- Origin: Osaka, Japan
- Genres: Traditional Japanese music
- Occupations: Musician, songwriter, educator
- Instruments: Tsuzumi, ōtsuzumi, taiko, many others
- Years active: 1989-present
- Member of: National Theater of Japan

Tōsha Roei (藤舎呂英) (born 1966) is a Japanese percussionist in the tradition of traditional Japanese theatre. A member of the Tōsha school or lineage of musicians, he is classically trained in performing percussion for the Kabuki theatre, but performs in a wider variety of contexts.

Roei studied under Tōsha Seiko and Tōsha Rosen VI, sixth iemoto (head) of the school. He was formally accepted into the school and took on the name Tōsha Roei after graduating from the Tokyo National University of Fine Arts and Music in 1989. He now heads the hayashi (musical accompanists section) at the National Theater in Tokyo, a position he has held since 1995. Though his particular specialty is the tsuzumi, in this role he must show his superior ability in ōtsuzumi, taiko and other drums, along with flutes and all the myriad whistles, bells, and other instruments used by the hayashi. Roei also plays a number of other instruments, including biwa, koto, and piano.

He was presented with the Award of the Foundation for the Development of Traditional Japanese Culture in 2006.

He often collaborates with modern and Western artists to create new works based in the foundations of traditional Japanese music. However, he is also deeply involved in projects to pass on the art of traditional Japanese music to the next generation, and to encourage appreciation for it.
