= Be My Boyz =

2025 South Korean reality competition show

- Hangul: 비 마이 보이즈
- RR: Bi mai boijeu
- MR: Pi mai poijŭ
- Created by: SBS
- Judges: NCT; Monsta X; Wanna One; TVXQ!; (See Cast)
- Opening theme: Be My Boyz
- Country of origin: South Korea
- Original language: Korean
- No. of episodes: 11

Production
- Executive producer: Yoon Hyun-joon
- Running time: 60 minutes
- Production companies: SBS; JTBC (former)

Original release
- Network: SBS
- Release: June 21 – August 30, 2025

Be My Boyz (Korean: 비 마이 보이즈; stylized as B:My Boyz) is a 2025 South Korean boy group reality competition survival show created by SBS. It followed the process of creating a new global boy group. It premiered on SBS on June 21, 2025, and aired every Saturday at 17:20 (KST). The show ended on August 30, 2025, with the formation of an eight-member boy group named Yuhz.

== Production and background ==
On August 6, 2024, JTBC announced that they would be inviting any boy to apply for their newest survival show. The program was revealed to become produced by the creators of Sing Again, and that it would air in 2025. After some time, the program moved its production to SBS and revealed that it would air in June 2025.

On May 1, 2025, B:My Boyz opened all of their social media accounts and unveiled the logo teaser and candid concept photos for the show, followed by revealing the 30 contestants with silhouette mood cuts and closeup concept photos the following day, on May 2, 2025.

The show was originally supposed to start airing on June 14, 2025, but it was then postponed to the following week, to start on June 21, 2025.

== Cast ==
- MCs
  - Miyeon (Ep. 1-3, 7-11)
  - Dex (Ep. 3-11)
- Masters
  - Hui (Production)
  - Jinho (Vocal Master)
  - Yuju (Vocal Master)
  - Lia Kim (Dance Master)
  - Lee Yoojung (Dance Master)
- Top Idols
  - Round 1: Johnny, Jungwoo, Ten, & Xiaojun (NCT)
  - Round 2: Shownu, Kihyun, & Hyungwon (Monsta X)
  - Round 3: Bae Jin-young, Lee Dae-hwi, Ha Sung-woon, & Park Woo-jin (Wanna One)
  - Round 4: Yunho (TVXQ!)

== Episodes ==
No.	Title	Original release date
1	"Chapter.1: RIIZE - Get A Guitar"	June 21, 2025
2	"Chapter 2: TOP PICK, Between Survival and Elimination" (Korean: TOP PICK, 생준과 탈락 사이)	June 28, 2025
3	"Chapter 3: The Start of the Team Deathmatch" (Korean: 팀 데스매치의 시작)	July 5, 2025
4	"Chapter 4: 13 vs 13 Deathmatch: The Moment Your Destiny Changes" (Korean: 운명이 바뀔 순간 13 vs 13 데스매치)	July 12, 2025
5	"Chapter 5: Top Pick, Team Survival" (Korean: 탑픽, 팀 전원 생존을 향해)	July 19, 2025
6	"Chapter.6: 48 Hours to Complete the Signal Song" (Korean: 48시간, 시그널송을 완성하라)	July 26, 2025
7	"Chapter.7: The Moment of Choice, B:ginner's Pick Match" (Korean: 선택의 순간, B:ginner’s Pick 매치)	August 2, 2025
8	"Chapter 8: Round 3, Fate-Defining Choices and Results" (Korean: 3라운드, 운명을 건 선택과 결과)	August 9, 2025
9	"Chapter 9: The Last Hurdle Before the Finals, K-Pop Legend Match" (Korean: 파이널 마지막 관문, K-Pop 레전드 매치)	August 16, 2025
10	"Chapter 10: Towards the Final Round" (Korean: 파이널 라운드를 향하여)	August 23, 2025
11	"Chapter 11:"	August 30, 2025

== Contestants ==
There are 30 contestants participating in the program from various countries, primarily South Korea, Japan, China, Thailand, and Australia. The English names of all the contestants are presented in accordance with the official website.

Color key

Final members of Yuhz
Contestant eliminated in the final episode
Contestant eliminated at the fourth elimination round
Contestant eliminated at the third elimination round
Contestant eliminated at the second elimination round
Contestant eliminated at the first elimination round
Contestant left the show
Top 8 of the Ranking Announcement (Note: Ep 1: Top 4)
Top Idols' Top Pick
Top 8 and Top Pick

Company	Name	Age (Note: As of June 21, 2025, added new age if contestant is still in the show during their birthday)	Nationality	Ranking							
Company	Name	Age	Nationality	Ep. 1 (Note: Surprise Mission)	Round 1	Round 2	Ep. 6 (Note: Signal Song Surprise Mission, ties broken with previous rank)	Round 3	Round 4	Final Round	Final
Company	Name	Age	Nationality	#	#	#	#	#	#	#	#
Watanabe Entertainment (ワタナベ)	Hyo (飛燿 / 효) (Note: Hyo was a contestant on Boys Planet)	23	Japan	22	7	4	14	1	1	1	1
Individual Trainees (개인 연습생)	Lee Yeon-tae (이연태) (Note: Kim Bo-hyeon, Lee Yeon-tae, Lee Yun-sung, and William were all contestants on Project 7, but did not make it past the Zero Setting Test)	16	South Korea	14	4	2	5	2	6	2	2
Individual Trainees (개인 연습생)	Moon Jae-il (문재일)	18	South Korea	3	6	16	1	10	2	3	3
Individual Trainees (개인 연습생)	Kim Bo-hyeon (김보현)	24	South Korea	17	8	9	11	7	3	4	4
Individual Trainees (개인 연습생)	Kai (카이)	18	Japan; Mexico	1	10	10	3	5	5	5	5
Individual Trainees (개인 연습생)	Kang Jun-seong (강준성)	19	South Korea	2	3	5	7	3	4	6	6
Cube Entertainment (큐브엔터테인먼트)	Park Se-chan (박세찬)	15	South Korea	8	2	8	9	6	8	7	7
Individual Trainees (개인 연습생)	Haruto (하루토)	21	Japan	5	9	7	15	4	10	8	8
Individual Trainees (개인 연습생)	Ai (아이)	19	Japan	11	18	1	13	9	14	9	9
Individual Trainees (개인 연습생)	Yang Hyeon-bin (양현빈)	18	South Korea	15	12	15	8	13	7	10	10
Individual Trainees (개인 연습생)	Seo Jun-hyeok (서준혁) (Note: Seo Jun-hyeok was a member of Celest1a.)	22	South Korea	20	11	19	6	12	11	11	11
Individual Trainees (개인 연습생)	Lee Yun-sung (이윤성)	19	South Korea	4	1	6	22	11	12	12	12
Individual Trainees (개인 연습생)	Ban Daniel (반다니엘)	14	South Korea	11	19	25	18	19	13	13	13
Individual Trainees (개인 연습생)	Lee Jun-myeong (이준명)	21	South Korea	6	24	18	2	8	9	Left the show (Note: Lee Junmyeong left the show between the end of filming of Round 4 and the finale airing due to health issues, so he was unable to perform in the finale.)	14
Cube Entertainment (큐브엔터테인먼트)	Kim Jeong-hoon (김정훈)	17	South Korea	20	26	22	10	14	15	Eliminated	15
KPLUS (케이플러스)	Jang Won (장원)	22-23	South Korea	9	17	12	19	17	16	Eliminated	16
Individual Trainees (개인 연습생)	Lim Ji-hwan (임지환)	22	South Korea	7	23	20	20	16	17	Eliminated	17
Individual Trainees (개인 연습생)	Park Jun-hyeok (박준혁)	18	South Korea	15	15	11	23 (Note: Park Junhyeok and Yang Chengxi were excluded from this mission for violating show rules)	18	18	Eliminated	18
I.E.One Entertainment (缔壹娱乐)	Li Zhiwei (李致伟 / 리쯔웨이) (Note: Li Zhiwei was a contestant on Universe League)	23	China	30	22	14	12	15	19	Eliminated	19
Individual Trainees (개인 연습생)	Hiroto (海都 / 히로토)	20-21	Japan	18	20	3	21	20	20	Eliminated	20
Individual Trainees (개인 연습생)	William (윌리엄)	19	South Korea; Australia	23	21	24	4	21	Eliminated		21
Individual Trainees (개인 연습생)	Ikuto (育利 / 이쿠토)	21	Japan	11	5	13	17	22	Eliminated		22
Individual Trainees (개인 연습생)	Choi Yo-han (최요한)	17	South Korea	25	13	26	16	23	Eliminated		23
Individual Trainees (개인 연습생)	Yang Chengxi (양성희)	20	China	25	25	21	24	24	Eliminated		24
Individual Trainees (개인 연습생)	Hwang Hee-woo (황희우)	19	South Korea	10	16	17	Eliminated				25
DCT Entertainment	Suthaschai (스타차이)	17	Thailand	29	14	23	Eliminated				26
Individual Trainees (개인 연습생)	Jang Hui-gwang (장희광)	18	Vietnam; South Korea	23	27	Eliminated					27
Individual Trainees (개인 연습생)	Didi (디디)	15	China	25	28	Eliminated					28
Individual Trainees (개인 연습생)	Lee Seong-in (이성인)	17	South Korea	25	29	Eliminated					29
Individual Trainees (개인 연습생)	Luo Zhuobin (罗卓滨 / 나탁빈) (Note: Luo Zhuobin was a contestant on Chuang Asia 2) (Note: Luo Zhuobin was confirmed to be a contestant on the show through preshow promotions, but was confirmed to have left the show prior to the airing of the first episode.)	20	China	19 (Note: Luo Zhuobin had already been confirmed to have left the show, but was still included in the filming of the episode.)	Left the show						30

== Missions ==
=== Surprise Mission (Episode 1) ===
This surprise mission has all the contestants presenting the choreography they've been practicing for a week. The contestants all entered the stage room with the show's logo pattern on the wall behind them. The walls then opens up, revealing a stage and an audience of 100 people behind it. Once the contestants have organized themselves on the stage, the music for the surprise mission begins. This mission has the contestants dancing the choreography to 'Get a Guitar' by Riize. After the contestants have presented the choreography, the audience is to vote for five contestants each, with the top four contestants from the audience voting get a benefit, which is later revealed to be the chance to choose their teams, and song and concept for the next mission.

Color key

Top 4

Surprise Mission Voting Results
Rank	Contestants	Votes	Rank	Contestants	Votes	Rank	Contestants	Votes
1	Kai	47	11	Ai	19	20	Seo Junhyeok	7
2	Kang Junseong	40	11	Ban Daniel	19	22	Hyo	6
3	Moon Jaeil	36	11	Ikuto	19	23	Jang Huigwang	4
4	Lee Yunsung	34	14	Lee Yeontae	17	23	William	4
5	Haruto	33	15	Park Junhyeok	15	25	Choi Yohan	2
6	Lee Junmyeong	30	15	Yang Hyeonbin	15	25	Didi	2
7	Lim Jihwan	29	17	Kim Bohyeon	14	25	Lee Seongin	2
8	Park Sechan	25	18	Hiroto	13	25	Suthaschai	2
9	Jang Won	24	19	Luo Zhuobin (Note: Luo Zhuobin left the show prior to the airing of the first episode, although was still in the filming for it, score calculated by subtracting all the other contestants scores from 500)	12	29	Yang Chengxi	1
10	Hwang Heewoo	22	20	Kim Jeonghoon	7	30	Li Zhiwei	0

=== Concept Battle (Episode 1-3) ===
This mission will have the contestants adapting to different styles and concepts for their performances. The contestants are presented with five NCT songs, each with their own concept attached to it. The chosen songs and concepts are as follows: Fact Check by NCT 127 - Charismatic, Love Talk by WayV - Sexy, Baggy Jeans by NCT U - Hip Hop, Kick It by NCT 127 - Powerful, and 90's Love by NCT U - Old School. The top four contestants from the Surprise Mission audience voting get the privilege or choosing the song they want, and the members they want for their team, from first down to fourth, with the remaining six contestants forming the final team. All the teams get three weeks to prepare for the stage. Once every team was finalized, and preparations had started, a secondary missions was revealed. The contestants would have to create about 30 seconds worth of their own choreography for one dedicated section of the song, either a chorus or a dance break. The winning team is chosen by the Top Idols for each round, this round having Johnny, Jungwoo, Ten, and Xiaojun of NCT. Alongside a winning team, the Top Idols will vote for the best contestant from each of the other teams, for a total of ten selected contestants. The members of the Top Pick Team, and the Top Pick Contestants will be safe from elimination and immediately passed to the next round, regardless of their ranking amongst the other contestants. The contestants chosen as Top Picks all also get VIP skincare as an extra reward.

Color key

Leader
Top Pick Team
Top Pick Contestants
Contestant did not perform

Bold denotes the contestant who picked each team's members.

Round 1: NCT Concept Battle
Performance				Team		Results
#	Concept	Song	Original Artist(s)	Name	Members	Results
2	Charismatic	"Fact Check" (불가사의; 不可思議)	NCT 127	Check	Kim Jeonghoon	Top Pick
2	Charismatic	"Fact Check" (불가사의; 不可思議)	NCT 127	Check	Li Zhiwei	Top Pick
2	Charismatic	"Fact Check" (불가사의; 不可思議)	NCT 127	Check	Park Sechan	Top Pick
2	Charismatic	"Fact Check" (불가사의; 不可思議)	NCT 127	Check	Lim Jihwan	Top Pick
2	Charismatic	"Fact Check" (불가사의; 不可思議)	NCT 127	Check	**Kai**	Top Pick
2	Charismatic	"Fact Check" (불가사의; 不可思議)	NCT 127	Check	Hyo	Top Pick
3	Sexy	"Love Talk" (秘语)	WayV	Sexy Talk	Suthaschai	Top Pick
3	Sexy	"Love Talk" (秘语)	WayV	Sexy Talk	Choi Yohan	-
3	Sexy	"Love Talk" (秘语)	WayV	Sexy Talk	Kim Bohyeon	-
3	Sexy	"Love Talk" (秘语)	WayV	Sexy Talk	Didi	-
3	Sexy	"Love Talk" (秘语)	WayV	Sexy Talk	Jang Won	-
3	Sexy	"Love Talk" (秘语)	WayV	Sexy Talk	Yang Chengxi	-
1	Hip Hop	"Baggy Jeans"	NCT U	못 배기진스	**Moon Jaeil**	-
1	Hip Hop	"Baggy Jeans"	NCT U	못 배기진스	Ban Daniel	-
1	Hip Hop	"Baggy Jeans"	NCT U	못 배기진스	Yang Hyeonbin	-
1	Hip Hop	"Baggy Jeans"	NCT U	못 배기진스	Lee Seongin	-
1	Hip Hop	"Baggy Jeans"	NCT U	못 배기진스	Lee Yeontae	-
1	Hip Hop	"Baggy Jeans"	NCT U	못 배기진스	Lee Junmyeong	Top Pick
5	Powerful	"Kick It" (英雄; 영웅)	NCT 127	Bruce Lee	Seo Junhyeok	-
5	Powerful	"Kick It" (英雄; 영웅)	NCT 127	Bruce Lee	William	Top Pick
5	Powerful	"Kick It" (英雄; 영웅)	NCT 127	Bruce Lee	**Lee Yunsung**	-
5	Powerful	"Kick It" (英雄; 영웅)	NCT 127	Bruce Lee	Hwang Heewoo	-
5	Powerful	"Kick It" (英雄; 영웅)	NCT 127	Bruce Lee	Hiroto	-
5	Powerful	"Kick It" (英雄; 영웅)	NCT 127	Bruce Lee	Luo Zhuobin	N/A
4	Old School	"90's Love"	NCT U	That 90's Love	**Kang Junseong**	-
4	Old School	"90's Love"	NCT U	That 90's Love	Park Junhyeok	Top Pick
4	Old School	"90's Love"	NCT U	That 90's Love	Ai	-
4	Old School	"90's Love"	NCT U	That 90's Love	Ikuto	-
4	Old School	"90's Love"	NCT U	That 90's Love	Jang Huigwang	-
4	Old School	"90's Love"	NCT U	That 90's Love	Haruto	-

=== 13vs13 Team Deathmatch (Episode 3-5) ===
Prior to the announcement to this mission, the contestants were divided into two groups of thirteen each, to settle into their dorm arrangements, decided by the Masters to balance out the skill level as equally as possible. The Masters also divided themselves into two groups of two, to be each team's coaches. This mission would have the two teams of contestants go head to head against each other in a deathmatch, competing across three matches. The first match is a 9vs9 match with the Top Idols title songs, the second match is a 4vs4 vocal match, and the third match is a 13vs13 mega performance match. The songs presented as options for each match are as follows: Love Killa and Shoot Out by Monsta X - Title Songs, Untitled by G-Dragon, Four Seasons by Taeyeon, Spring Day by BTS, and You Were Beautiful by Day6 - Vocal, and Trespass by Monsta X - Mega Performance. The teams chose their songs and/or performance order through a sports day, led by Production Master Hui. The winners of each of the three events got the rights to choose either the song they wanted, or the performance order, depending on the event. Both teams had two and a half weeks to prepare for all their stages. For the vocal match and the mega performance match stages, the contestants had to create the arrangement or choreography, the stage concept, and the visual concept themselves. The Top Idols for this round are Shownu, Kihyun, & Hyungwon of Monsta X. Alongside choosing the winning team, the Top Idols will choose two contestants from the losing team, for a total of fifteen selected contestants. All the members of the Top Pick Team, and the Top Pick Contestants will be safe from elimination and immediately passed to the next round, regardless of their ranking amongst the other contestants.

Color key

Center
Leader
Leader and Center
Top Pick

Round 2: 13vs13 Team Deathmatch
My Monstaz					Monsta B				
Performance			Contestants	Result	Performance			Contestants	Result
#	Song	Original Artist(s)	Contestants	Result	#	Song	Original Artist(s)	Contestants	Result
9vs9 Title Song Match
1	"Love Killa"	Monsta X	Kim Jeonghoon	-	2	"Shoot Out"	Monsta X	Kim Bohyeon	-
1	"Love Killa"	Monsta X	Ban Daniel	-	2	"Shoot Out"	Monsta X	Moon Jaeil	-
1	"Love Killa"	Monsta X	Yang Chengxi	-	2	"Shoot Out"	Monsta X	Suthaschai	-
1	"Love Killa"	Monsta X	William	-	2	"Shoot Out"	Monsta X	Ai	-
1	"Love Killa"	Monsta X	Lee Yeontae	-	2	"Shoot Out"	Monsta X	Yang Hyeonbin	-
1	"Love Killa"	Monsta X	Lee Yunsung	-	2	"Shoot Out"	Monsta X	Kai	-
1	"Love Killa"	Monsta X	Ikuto	-	2	"Shoot Out"	Monsta X	Haruto	-
1	"Love Killa"	Monsta X	Choi Yohan	-	2	"Shoot Out"	Monsta X	Hwang Heewoo	-
1	"Love Killa"	Monsta X	Hyo	-	2	"Shoot Out"	Monsta X	Hiroto	-
4vs4 Vocal Match
3	"Spring Day" (봄날)	BTS	Park Sechan	-	4	"You Were Beautiful" (예뻤어)	Day6	Li Zhiwei	-
3	"Spring Day" (봄날)	BTS	Seo Junhyeok	-	4	"You Were Beautiful" (예뻤어)	Day6	Park Junhyeok	-
3	"Spring Day" (봄날)	BTS	Lee Junmyeong	-	4	"You Were Beautiful" (예뻤어)	Day6	Kang Junseong	-
3	"Spring Day" (봄날)	BTS	Lim Jihwan	-	4	"You Were Beautiful" (예뻤어)	Day6	Jang Won	-
13vs13 Mega Performance Match
5	"Trespass" (무단침입)	Monsta X	Ban Daniel	Top Pick	6	"Trespass" (무단침입)	Monsta X	Ai	-
5	"Trespass" (무단침입)	Monsta X	Choi Yohan	Top Pick	6	"Trespass" (무단침입)	Monsta X	Haruto	-
5	"Trespass" (무단침입)	Monsta X	Hyo	Top Pick	6	"Trespass" (무단침입)	Monsta X	Hiroto	-
5	"Trespass" (무단침입)	Monsta X	Ikuto	Top Pick	6	"Trespass" (무단침입)	Monsta X	Hwang Heewoo	-
5	"Trespass" (무단침입)	Monsta X	Kim Jeonghoon	Top Pick	6	"Trespass" (무단침입)	Monsta X	Jang Won	-
5	"Trespass" (무단침입)	Monsta X	Lee Junmyeong	Top Pick	6	"Trespass" (무단침입)	Monsta X	Kai	-
5	"Trespass" (무단침입)	Monsta X	Lee Yeontae	Top Pick	6	"Trespass" (무단침입)	Monsta X	Kang Junseong	Top Pick
5	"Trespass" (무단침입)	Monsta X	Lee Yunsung	Top Pick	6	"Trespass" (무단침입)	Monsta X	Kim Bohyeon	-
5	"Trespass" (무단침입)	Monsta X	Lim Jihwan	Top Pick	6	"Trespass" (무단침입)	Monsta X	Li Zhiwei	-
5	"Trespass" (무단침입)	Monsta X	Park Sechan	Top Pick	6	"Trespass" (무단침입)	Monsta X	Moon Jaeil	Top Pick
5	"Trespass" (무단침입)	Monsta X	Seo Junhyeok	Top Pick	6	"Trespass" (무단침입)	Monsta X	Park Junhyeok	-
5	"Trespass" (무단침입)	Monsta X	William	Top Pick	6	"Trespass" (무단침입)	Monsta X	Suthaschai	-
5	"Trespass" (무단침입)	Monsta X	Yang Chengxi	Top Pick	6	"Trespass" (무단침입)	Monsta X	Yang Hyeonbin	-

=== Signal Song Surprise Mission (Episode 6) ===
This mission would have the contestants learning and performing the signal song of the show, 'Be My Boyz', live. The contestants would start by separating into teams of two to start their preparations. They would all have 48 hours to learn the choreography and the vocals of the whole song. The order of the teams performances were determined through a random box draw. Instead of performing for the Masters, the contestants would be presenting their preparations to an audience global fans, who would be their judges for the mission. Each judge would score each team on a scale from 1–5, with the higher ranked teams getting a benefit, which is later revealed to be the chance to push lower ranked contestants out of their initially chosen song for the next mission.

Color key

Not Broadcast

Signal Song Surprise Mission
Performance			Teams		
Song	Production Credit	#	Teams		
Song	Production Credit	#	Contestants		Rank
"Be My Boyz"	Lyrics & Composition: AVEC, Bull$EyE; Choreography: Lia Kim, Lee Yoojung	1	Ai	Hyo	7
"Be My Boyz"	Lyrics & Composition: AVEC, Bull$EyE; Choreography: Lia Kim, Lee Yoojung	2	Hiroto	Lee Yunsung	11
"Be My Boyz"	Lyrics & Composition: AVEC, Bull$EyE; Choreography: Lia Kim, Lee Yoojung	3	Ban Daniel	Ikuto	9
"Be My Boyz"	Lyrics & Composition: AVEC, Bull$EyE; Choreography: Lia Kim, Lee Yoojung	4	Park Sechan	Kim Jeonghoon	5
"Be My Boyz"	Lyrics & Composition: AVEC, Bull$EyE; Choreography: Lia Kim, Lee Yoojung	5	William	Kai	2
"Be My Boyz"	Lyrics & Composition: AVEC, Bull$EyE; Choreography: Lia Kim, Lee Yoojung	6	Lee Yeontae	Seo Junhyeok	3
"Be My Boyz"	Lyrics & Composition: AVEC, Bull$EyE; Choreography: Lia Kim, Lee Yoojung	7	Kang Junseong	Yang Hyeonbin	4
"Be My Boyz"	Lyrics & Composition: AVEC, Bull$EyE; Choreography: Lia Kim, Lee Yoojung	8	Moon Jaeil	Lee Junmyeong	1
"Be My Boyz"	Lyrics & Composition: AVEC, Bull$EyE; Choreography: Lia Kim, Lee Yoojung	-	Kim Bohyeon	Li Zhiwei	6
"Be My Boyz"	Lyrics & Composition: AVEC, Bull$EyE; Choreography: Lia Kim, Lee Yoojung	-	Choi Yohan	Haruto	8
"Be My Boyz"	Lyrics & Composition: AVEC, Bull$EyE; Choreography: Lia Kim, Lee Yoojung	-	Jang Won	Lim Jihwan	10

=== B:ginner's Pick Match (Episode 7-8) ===
This mission will have the contestants decide everything through their own choices. The contestants are presented with four Wanna One songs for this match: Energetic, Beautiful, Boomerang, and Burn It Up, with the first two being the first matchup, and the latter two being the second matchup. Each team will perform the second verse of the song they chose themselves, and the first verse of the opponent team's song as well. The team selection are determined starting from the lowest ranking contestants from the previous mission filling in the spots in their desired song, then the higher ranking contestants follow, pushing others out when necessary. All teams would have two weeks to prepare for their performances. The Top Idols for this round are Bae Jin-young, Lee Dae-hwi, Ha Sung-woon, & Park Woo-jin of Wanna One. The Top Idols will choose the two winning teams, and from those teams, two contestants from each, alongside one contestant from each of the losing teams, for a total of six selected contestants, to be their Top Picks. The contestants on the winning teams would receive an extra 100 points to their vote tally for the Round 3 voting, while all the Top Pick Contestants would be safe from elimination and immediately passed to the next round, regardless of their ranking amongst the other contestants.

Color key

Leader
Winning Team
Top Pick

Round 3: B:ginner's Pick Match
Performance							Result (Note: Results apply to Verse 2 lineup)		Performance							Result	
#	Song	Original Artist(s)	Verse 1		Verse 2 (Note: The teams performing the second verses are all the original teams for each song)		Result		#	Song	Original Artist(s)	Verse 1		Verse 2		Result	
#	Song	Original Artist(s)	Team	Contestants	Team	Contestants	Result		#	Song	Original Artist(s)	Team	Contestants	Team	Contestants	Result	
1	"Energetic" (에너제틱)	Wanna One	Beautiful (에너 + 풀)	Kang Junseong	Energetic (뷰티 + 제틱)	Kim Bohyeon	-	-	3	"Boomerang" (부메랑)	Wanna One	Burn It Up (부 + 활)	Kim Jeonghoon	Boomerang (활 + 메랑)	Park Junhyeok (Note: Yang Chengxi and Park Junhyeok were automatically slotted into Boomerang as they did not participate in the last mission due to violating show rules)	-	-
1	"Energetic" (에너제틱)	Wanna One	Beautiful (에너 + 풀)	Seo Junhyeok	Energetic (뷰티 + 제틱)	Li Zhiwei	-	Top Pick	3	"Boomerang" (부메랑)	Wanna One	Burn It Up (부 + 활)	Moon Jaeil	Boomerang (활 + 메랑)	Ban Daniel	-	-
1	"Energetic" (에너제틱)	Wanna One	Beautiful (에너 + 풀)	Ai	Energetic (뷰티 + 제틱)	William	-	-	3	"Boomerang" (부메랑)	Wanna One	Burn It Up (부 + 활)	Park Sechan	Boomerang (활 + 메랑)	Yang Chengxi	-	-
1	"Energetic" (에너제틱)	Wanna One	Beautiful (에너 + 풀)	Lim Jihwan	Energetic (뷰티 + 제틱)	Ikuto	-	-	3	"Boomerang" (부메랑)	Wanna One	Burn It Up (부 + 활)	Yang Hyeonbin	Boomerang (활 + 메랑)	Lee Yunsung	-	-
1	"Energetic" (에너제틱)	Wanna One	Beautiful (에너 + 풀)	Haruto	Energetic (뷰티 + 제틱)	Choi Yohan	-	-	3	"Boomerang" (부메랑)	Wanna One	Burn It Up (부 + 활)	Lee Yeontae	Boomerang (활 + 메랑)	Jang Won	-	-
1	"Energetic" (에너제틱)	Wanna One	Beautiful (에너 + 풀)	Hyo	Energetic (뷰티 + 제틱)	Hiroto	-	-	3	"Boomerang" (부메랑)	Wanna One	Burn It Up (부 + 활)	Lee Junmyeong	Boomerang (활 + 메랑)	Kai	-	Top Pick
2	"Beautiful"	Wanna One	Energetic (뷰티 + 제틱)	Kim Bohyeon	Beautiful (에너 + 풀)	Kang Junseong	Win	-	4	"Burn It Up" (활활)	Wanna One	Boomerang (활 + 메랑)	Park Junhyeok	Burn It Up (부 + 활)	Kim Jeonghoon	Win	Top Pick
2	"Beautiful"	Wanna One	Energetic (뷰티 + 제틱)	Li Zhiwei	Beautiful (에너 + 풀)	Seo Junhyeok	Win	Top Pick	4	"Burn It Up" (활활)	Wanna One	Boomerang (활 + 메랑)	Ban Daniel	Burn It Up (부 + 활)	Moon Jaeil	Win	Top Pick
2	"Beautiful"	Wanna One	Energetic (뷰티 + 제틱)	William	Beautiful (에너 + 풀)	Ai	Win	-	4	"Burn It Up" (활활)	Wanna One	Boomerang (활 + 메랑)	Yang Chengxi	Burn It Up (부 + 활)	Park Sechan	Win	-
2	"Beautiful"	Wanna One	Energetic (뷰티 + 제틱)	Ikuto	Beautiful (에너 + 풀)	Lim Jihwan	Win	-	4	"Burn It Up" (활활)	Wanna One	Boomerang (활 + 메랑)	Lee Yunsung	Burn It Up (부 + 활)	Yang Hyeonbin	Win	-
2	"Beautiful"	Wanna One	Energetic (뷰티 + 제틱)	Choi Yohan	Beautiful (에너 + 풀)	Haruto	Win	-	4	"Burn It Up" (활활)	Wanna One	Boomerang (활 + 메랑)	Jang Won	Burn It Up (부 + 활)	Lee Yeontae	Win	-
2	"Beautiful"	Wanna One	Energetic (뷰티 + 제틱)	Hiroto	Beautiful (에너 + 풀)	Hyo	Win	Top Pick	4	"Burn It Up" (활활)	Wanna One	Boomerang (활 + 메랑)	Kai	Burn It Up (부 + 활)	Lee Junmyeong	Win	-

=== K-Pop Legend Match (Episode 8-10) ===
This mission is split into two parts, each with its own performance. The choice song match will have contestants creating intros based on a given keyword to apply before their performance, and the designated song match will have all the teams performing parts of the same song. The team selections are determined by the top three contestants from the Round 3 voting, who would have the privileges to choose their choice song, and then their teammates in alternating fashion, starting from 1st place, down to 3rd, and repeating. The contestants are presented with three TVXQ! songs for the choice song match: Mirotic, Rising Sun, and Keep Your Head Down, and the song for the designated song match was revealed to be Hug. Once the top three contestants have chosen their song and their teams have been formed, each team will send up one contestant to random draw the keyword that's to be applied to the intro for their choice song performance. The keywords are revealed to be "Dynamism", "Addictiveness", and "Connectivity". All teams would have one and a half weeks to prepare for their performances. Instead of a standard midpoint check, the contestants would perform what they've prepared after three days to an audience of 400 high school students, who would be the ones to decide the order of the official performances through votes. The Top Idol for this round is Yunho of TVXQ!. The Top Idol would choose the winning team, and from that team, two contestants, alongside one contestant from each of the losing teams, for a total of four selected contestants, to be the Top Picks. The contestants on the winning team would receive an extra 100 points to their individual on-site vote tally for the Round 4 voting, while all the Top Pick Contestants would be safe from elimination and immediately passed to the next round, regardless of their ranking amongst the other contestants.

Color key

Leader
Winning Team
Top Pick

Bold denotes the contestant who picked each team's members.

Round 4: K-Pop Legend Match
#	Performance			Contestants	#	Performance			Contestants	Results	
#	Keyword	Song	Original Artist(s)	Contestants	#	Song	Original Artist(s)	Part	Contestants	Results	
3	"Connectivity" (연결성)	"Mirotic" (주문)	TVXQ!	**Lee Yeontae**	4	"Hug" (포옹)	TVXQ!	Part 1	**Lee Yeontae**	Win	-
3	"Connectivity" (연결성)	"Mirotic" (주문)	TVXQ!	Moon Jaeil	4	"Hug" (포옹)	TVXQ!	Part 1	Moon Jaeil	Win	Top Pick
3	"Connectivity" (연결성)	"Mirotic" (주문)	TVXQ!	Lee Junmyeong	4	"Hug" (포옹)	TVXQ!	Part 1	Lee Junmyeong	Win	-
3	"Connectivity" (연결성)	"Mirotic" (주문)	TVXQ!	Seo Junhyeok	4	"Hug" (포옹)	TVXQ!	Part 1	Seo Junhyeok	Win	-
3	"Connectivity" (연결성)	"Mirotic" (주문)	TVXQ!	Yang Hyeonbin	4	"Hug" (포옹)	TVXQ!	Part 1	Yang Hyeonbin	Win	-
3	"Connectivity" (연결성)	"Mirotic" (주문)	TVXQ!	Kim Bohyeon	4	"Hug" (포옹)	TVXQ!	Part 1	Kim Bohyeon	Win	-
3	"Connectivity" (연결성)	"Mirotic" (주문)	TVXQ!	Ban Daniel	4	"Hug" (포옹)	TVXQ!	Part 1	Ban Daniel	Win	Top Pick
1	"Addictiveness" (중독성)	"Rising Sun" (순수)	TVXQ!	**Hyo**	4	"Hug" (포옹)	TVXQ!	Part 2	**Hyo**	-	Top Pick
1	"Addictiveness" (중독성)	"Rising Sun" (순수)	TVXQ!	Park Junhyeok	4	"Hug" (포옹)	TVXQ!	Part 2	Park Junhyeok	-	-
1	"Addictiveness" (중독성)	"Rising Sun" (순수)	TVXQ!	Ai	4	"Hug" (포옹)	TVXQ!	Part 2	Ai	-	-
1	"Addictiveness" (중독성)	"Rising Sun" (순수)	TVXQ!	Lim Jihwan	4	"Hug" (포옹)	TVXQ!	Part 2	Lim Jihwan	-	-
1	"Addictiveness" (중독성)	"Rising Sun" (순수)	TVXQ!	Park Sechan	4	"Hug" (포옹)	TVXQ!	Part 2	Park Sechan	-	-
1	"Addictiveness" (중독성)	"Rising Sun" (순수)	TVXQ!	Li Zhiwei	4	"Hug" (포옹)	TVXQ!	Part 2	Li Zhiwei	-	-
2	"Dynamism" (역동성)	"Keep Your Head Down" (왜)	TVXQ!	**Kang Junseong**	4	"Hug" (포옹)	TVXQ!	Part 3	**Kang Junseong**	-	-
2	"Dynamism" (역동성)	"Keep Your Head Down" (왜)	TVXQ!	Kim Jeonghoon	4	"Hug" (포옹)	TVXQ!	Part 3	Kim Jeonghoon	-	-
2	"Dynamism" (역동성)	"Keep Your Head Down" (왜)	TVXQ!	Kai	4	"Hug" (포옹)	TVXQ!	Part 3	Kai	-	Top Pick
2	"Dynamism" (역동성)	"Keep Your Head Down" (왜)	TVXQ!	Haruto	4	"Hug" (포옹)	TVXQ!	Part 3	Haruto	-	-
2	"Dynamism" (역동성)	"Keep Your Head Down" (왜)	TVXQ!	Jang Won	4	"Hug" (포옹)	TVXQ!	Part 3	Jang Won	-	-
2	"Dynamism" (역동성)	"Keep Your Head Down" (왜)	TVXQ!	Hiroto	4	"Hug" (포옹)	TVXQ!	Part 3	Hiroto	-	-
2	"Dynamism" (역동성)	"Keep Your Head Down" (왜)	TVXQ!	Lee Yunsung	4	"Hug" (포옹)	TVXQ!	Part 3	Lee Yunsung	-	-

=== B:inUS Final Pick Match (Episode 10-11) ===
The final mission will have the contestants performing original songs for the fans, who would be deciding the final members of the debut group, rather than an experienced idol making the decisions. The two original songs the contestants are presented with are called "Knockin' On Heaven" and "Slanted". The team selections are determined by the top two contestants from the Round 4 voting, who would have the privileges to organize the other contestants into teams in alternating fashion, with the 1st place contestant finalizing the teams by joining one of the teams created and selecting the songs for each team. All teams would have around a month and a week to prepare for their performances. The contestants were not directly assessed based on their performances this time around, instead, after the performances, the members of the debut group selected through fan voting were announced.

Color key

Contestant did not perform

Bold denotes the two contestants who built the two teams.

Final Round: B:inUS Final Pick Match
#	Performance		Contestants
#	Song	Production Credit	Name
1	"Knockin' On Heaven"	Lyrics & Composition: Hui	Kim Bohyeon
1	"Knockin' On Heaven"	Lyrics & Composition: Hui	Park Sechan
1	"Knockin' On Heaven"	Lyrics & Composition: Hui	Seo Junhyeok
1	"Knockin' On Heaven"	Lyrics & Composition: Hui	Ai
1	"Knockin' On Heaven"	Lyrics & Composition: Hui	Yang Hyeonbin
1	"Knockin' On Heaven"	Lyrics & Composition: Hui	**Hyo**
1	"Knockin' On Heaven"	Lyrics & Composition: Hui	Lee Junmyeong
2	"Slanted" (비스듬히)	Lyrics & Composition: Hui	Kang Junseong
2	"Slanted" (비스듬히)	Lyrics & Composition: Hui	**Moon Jaeil**
2	"Slanted" (비스듬히)	Lyrics & Composition: Hui	Ban Daniel
2	"Slanted" (비스듬히)	Lyrics & Composition: Hui	Lee Yeontae
2	"Slanted" (비스듬히)	Lyrics & Composition: Hui	Lee Yunsung
2	"Slanted" (비스듬히)	Lyrics & Composition: Hui	Kai
2	"Slanted" (비스듬히)	Lyrics & Composition: Hui	Haruto

== Rankings, Voting, and Eliminations ==
=== Voting ===
The voting process for B:My Boyz is done through the official SBS website, My 1 Pick, and MySta. Voting is permitted once daily, which consists of the selection of a certain number of contestants. For every elimination, SBS website votes are worth 20% of the total vote count for each contestant, My 1 Pick votes are worth 40%, (Note: 30% for the finale) and MySta votes are worth 10%.

=== Top 8 ===
The top eight contestants are determined through popularity with online voting, and the on-site audience voting, and the results are shown after each Round.

Color key

New to the Top 8 (Note: Indicates contestants who had never placed in the Top 8 in any prior elimination rounds or ranking announcements.)
Returned to Top 8 (Note: Indicates contestants who had placed in the Top 8 in a prior elimination round or ranking announcement, then had placed out of it, and then had came back)

Top 8 Contestants After Each Ranking Announcement
#	Ep. 1	Round 1	Round 2	Ep. 6	Round 3	Round 4	Final Round
1	Kai	Lee Yunsung (▲3)	Ai (▲17)	Moon Jaeil (▲15)	Hyo (▲13)	Hyo	Hyo
2	Kang Junseong	Park Sechan (▲6)	Lee Yeontae (▲2)	Lee Junmyeong (▲16)	Lee Yeontae (▲3)	Moon Jaeil (▲8)	Kim Yeontae (▲4)
3	Moon Jaeil	Kang Junseong (▼1)	Hiroto (▲17)	Kai (▲7)	Kang Junseong (▲4)	Kim Bohyeon (▲4)	Moon Jaeil (▼1)
4	Lee Yunsung	Lee Yeontae (▲10)	Hyo (▲3)	William (▲20)	Haruto (▲11)	Kang Junseong (▼1)	Kim Bohyeon (▼1)
5	Haruto	Ikuto (▲6)	Kang Junseong (▼2)	Lee Yeontae (▼3)	Kai (▼2)	Kai	Kai
6	Lee Junmyeong	Moon Jaeil (▼3)	Lee Yunsung (▼5)	Seo Junhyeok (▲13)	Park Sechan (▲3)	Lee Yeontae (▼4)	Kang Junseong (▼2)
7	Lim Jihwan	Hyo (▲15)	Haruto (▲2)	Kang Junseong (▼2)	Kim Bohyeon (▲4)	Yang Hyeonbin (▲6)	Park Sechan (▲1)
8	Park Sechan	Kim Bohyeon (▲9)	Park Sechan (▼6)	Yang Hyeonbin (▲7)	Lee Junmyeong (▼6)	Park Sechan (▼2)	Haruto (▲2)

=== Round 1 Eliminations ===
The first voting period took place from May 9, 2025, to May 14, 2025. The public audience would vote for their top eight contestants. Regarding eliminations, the bottom three contestants with the lowest combined score, from the first voting period (worth 70%) and the Round 1 on-site audience vote (worth 30%) would be eliminated, and unable to pass to the next round, excluding any contestant who was chosen as a Top Pick by the Top Idols, if applicable.

Color key

Top 8
Top Pick
Top Pick and Top 8
Eliminated

Round 1 Elimination Results (Episode 3)
Rank	Contestants	Rank	Contestants	Rank	Contestants
1	Lee Yunsung	11	Seo Junhyeok	21	William
2	Park Sechan	12	Yang Hyeonbin	22	Li Zhiwei
3	Kang Junseong	13	Choi Yohan	23	Lim Jihwan
4	Lee Yeontae	14	Suthaschai	24	Lee Junmyeong
5	Ikuto	15	Park Junhyeok	25	Yang Chengxi
6	Moon Jaeil	16	Hwang Heewoo	26	Kim Jeonghoon
7	Hyo	17	Jang Won	27	Jang Huigwang
8	Kim Bohyeon	18	Ai	28	Didi
9	Haruto	19	Ban Daniel	29	Lee Seongin
10	Kai	20	Hiroto		

=== Round 2 Eliminations ===
The second voting period took place from June 11, 2025, to June 16, 2025. The public audience would vote for their top eight contestants. Regarding eliminations, the bottom two contestants with the lowest combined score, from the second voting period (worth 70%) and the Round 2 on-site audience vote (worth 30%) would be eliminated, and unable to pass to the next round, excluding any contestant who was chosen as a Top Pick by the Top Idols.

Color key

Top 8
Top Pick
Top Pick and Top 8
Eliminated

Round 2 Elimination Results (Episode 6)
Rank	Contestants	Votes				
Rank	Contestants	Korean (Note: My1Pick Votes)	Global (Note: SBS Homepage Votes)	Japanese (Note: MySta Votes)	On-Site	Total
1	Ai (▲17)	17,280	5,650	18,020	6,780	47,730
2	Lee Yeontae (▲2)	26,560	5,370	880	13,560	46,370
3	Hiroto (▲17)	11,970	6,530	15,160	11,790	45,450
4	Hyo (▲3)	15,030	6,750	8,970	14,510	45,260
5	Kang Junseong (▼2)	14,700	9,440	1,980	18,630	44,750
6	Lee Yunsung (▼5)	15,660	9,580	1,830	13,940	41,010
7	Haruto (▲2)	13,350	8,320	5,540	12,860	40,070
8	Park Sechan (▼6)	15,310	9,760	1,390	12,740	39,200
9	Kim Bohyeon (▼1)	17,520	6,130	3,500	11,150	38,300
10	Kai	12,850	6,470	6,270	12,560	38,150
11	Park Junhyeok (▲4)	23,460	5,040	220	9,250	37,970
12	Jang Won (▲5)	14,830	6,410	2,330	13,690	37,260
13	Ikuto (▼8)	14,310	6,930	4,520	10,270	36,030
14	Li Zhiwei (▲8)	16,030	8,450	2,630	8,620	35,750
15	Yang Hyeon-bin (▼3)	12,850	6,670	950	14,890	35,360
16	Moon Jaeil (▼10)	11,430	7,090	2,040	14,450	35,010
17	Hwang Heewoo (▼1)	11,660	7,530	4,730	10,650	34,570
18	Lee Junmyeong (▲6)	10,760	6,570	3,430	12,860	33,620
19	Seo Junhyeok (▼8)	11,130	5,330	2,840	13,240	32,540
20	Lim Jihwan (▲3)	12,550	5,080	1,530	12,360	31,520
21	Yang Chengxi (▲4)	10,950	7,420	950	10,330	29,650
22	Kim Jeonghoon (▲4)	10,030	6,530	2,990	9,760	29,130
23	Suthaschai (▼9)	10,360	7,490	1,750	7,600	27,200
24	William (▼3)	13,620	5,130	580	6,910	26,240
25	Ban Daniel (▼6)	9,790	5,440	2,490	7,600	25,320
26	Choi Yohan (▼13)	10,130	4,920	730	9,000	24,780

=== Round 3 Eliminations ===
The third voting period took place from July 5, 2025, to July 9, 2025. The public audience would vote for their top eight contestants. Regarding eliminations, the bottom four contestants with the lowest combined score, from the third voting period (worth 70%) and the Round 3 on-site audience vote (worth 30%) would be eliminated, and unable to pass to the next round, excluding any contestant chosen as a Top Pick by the Top Idols, if applicable.

Color key

Top 8
Top Pick
Top Pick and Top 8
Eliminated

Round 3 Elimination Results (Episode 8)
Rank	Contestants	Rank	Contestants	Rank	Contestants
1	Hyo (▲3)	9	Ai (▼8)	17	Jang Won (▼5)
2	Lee Yeontae	10	Moon Jaeil (▲6)	18	Park Junhyeok (▼6)
3	Kang Junseong (▲2)	11	Lee Yunsung (▼5)	19	Ban Daniel (▲6)
4	Haruto (▲3)	12	Seo Junhyeok (▲7)	20	Hiroto (▼17)
5	Kai (▲5)	13	Yang Hyeonbin (▲2)	21	William (▲3)
6	Park Sechan (▲2)	14	Kim Jeonghoon (▲8)	22	Ikuto (▼9)
7	Kim Bohyeon (▲2)	15	Li Zhiwei (▼1)	23	Choi Yohan (▲3)
8	Lee Junmyeong (▲10)	16	Lim Jihwan (▲4)	24	Yang Chengxi (▼3)

=== Round 4 Eliminations ===
The fourth voting period took place from July 26, 2025, to August 4, 2025. The public audience would vote for their top eight contestants. Regarding eliminations, the bottom six contestants with the lowest combined score, from the fourth voting period (worth 70%) and the Round 4 on-site audience vote (worth 30%) would be eliminated, and unable to pass to the next round, excluding any contestant chosen as a Top Pick by the Top Idol, if applicable.

Color key

Top 8
Top Pick
Top Pick and Top 8
Eliminated

Round 4 Elimination Results (Episode 10)
Rank	Contestants	Points				
Rank	Contestants	Votes				Total
Rank	Contestants	Korean	Global	Japanese	On-Site (Note: Includes Benefit Points where applicable)	Total
1	Hyo	22,810	12,850	8,730	17,970	62,360
2	Moon Jaeil (▲8)	18,720	12,210	4,770	22,410	58,110
3	Kim Bohyeon (▲4)	22,190	6,770	2,680	20,890	52,530
4	Kang Junseong (▼1)	18,660	11,400	4,310	16,770	51,140
5	Kai	18,590	10,790	7,760	12,780	49,920
6	Lee Yeontae (▼4)	24,770	6,170	1,880	17,090	49,910
7	Yang Hyeonbin (▲6)	16,890	8,170	3,440	19,180	47,680
8	Park Sechan (▼2)	17,460	10,340	4,660	14,370	46,830
9	Lee Junmyeong (▼1)	15,450	9,050	3,480	17,470	45,450
10	Haruto (▼6)	17,060	9,200	4,730	13,860	44,850
11	Seo Junhyeok (▲1)	13,310	7,700	2,920	18,420	42,350
12	Lee Yunsung (▼1)	16,510	6,720	2,610	14,300	40,140
13	Ban Daniel (▲6)	12,280	6,180	4,140	17,530	40,130
14	Ai (▼5)	17,230	6,330	5,250	10,060	38,870
15	Kim Jeonghoon (▼1)	14,460	7,860	4,310	11,770	38,400
16	Jang Won (▲1)	16,300	6,640	1,980	13,230	38,150
17	Lim Jihwan (▼1)	14,900	5,780	2,330	14,940	37,950
18	Park Junhyeok	20,310	5,160	2,540	9,110	37,120
19	Li Zhiwei (▼4)	15,740	8,380	3,650	8,230	36,000
20	Hiroto	10,290	5,300	3,480	9,620	28,690

=== Final Round Eliminations ===
The final voting period took place from August 23, 2025, to August 29, 2025. The public audience would vote for their top four contestants. The final live voting period took place during the airing of the final episode, on August 30, 2025, and the public audience would vote for their one-pick contestant. Regarding eliminations, the bottom five contestants with the lowest combined score, from the fourth voting period (worth 60%) and the final live voting period would be eliminated, and the top eight contestants would become members of the YUHZ, the debut group

Color key

Top 8

Final Round Elimination Results
Rank	Contestants	Points	Rank	Contestants	Points	Rank	Contestants	Points
1	Hyo	130,400	6	Kang Junseong (▼2)	78,200	11	Seo Junhyeok	63,800
2	Kim Yeontae (▲4)	97,500	7	Park Sechan (▲1)	77,700	12	Lee Yunsung	40,800
3	Moon Jaeil (▼1)	92,600	8	Haruto (▲2)	74,900	13	Ban Daniel	35,700
4	Kim Bohyeon (▼1)	92,400	9	Ai (▲5)	70,100			
5	Kai	81,500	10	Yang Hyeonbin (▼3)	64,300			

== Discography ==
The theme song "Be My Boyz" was recorded and performed by the contestants. It was released on June 22, 2025, on digital music platforms.

=== Singles ===
Title	Year	Album
"Be My Boyz"	2025	B:MY BOYZ - Be My Boyz
"Be My Boyz (Inst.)"	2025	B:MY BOYZ - Be My Boyz
"Be My Boyz (Audition Ver)."	2025	B:MY BOYZ - Be My Boyz (Audition Ver.)
"Keep Running"	2025	B:MY BOYZ - FINAL ROUND
"Knockin' On Heaven"	2025	B:MY BOYZ - FINAL ROUND
"Slanted" (비스듬히)	2025	B:MY BOYZ - FINAL ROUND

== Aftermath ==
The final group, YUHZ will be active for 5 years after debut, and is manage by Pinnacle Entertainment. The group was aiming to debut in the first half of 2026. The group debuted on May 7, 2026, with the single album Orange Record.

Other contestants, other activities
- Some contestants left their companies or joined new ones:
  - Lee Jun-myeong (14th) joined WAYF.
  - Lim Ji-hwan (17th) joined ODDWAVE.
- Some contestants will debut or debuted in new boy groups or released music as solo artists:
  - Lee Jun-myeong (14th) was featured in Ryan's music video for 'Boys Plan', released on September 25, 2025.
    - He is set to debut as a member of WAYF's new boy group WAYF Boys in the second half of 2026.
  - Lim Ji-hwan (17th) debuted as a member of ODDWAVE's new boy group, Daily:Direction with their first single album First:Delivery with the title track 'ROOMBADOOMBA' on February 23, 2026.
  - Choi Yo-han (23rd) is set to debut as a member of Macaroni Music Entertainment's new upcoming boy group , AGD sometime in the second half of 2026.
  - Hwang Hee-woo (25th), under the stage name wishing4hue, debuted as a soloist with his first single Red Flag with a title track of the same name on May 5, 2025.
- Some contestants left the idol industry or further expanded their careers in the acting, modeling, or entertainment industry:
- Some contestants participated in other survival shows:
