= Dieudonné Larose =

Haitian singer-songwriter (1945–2026)

- Born: 5 June 1945; Cabaret, Haiti
- Died: 8 January 2026 (aged 80); Quebec, Canada
- Occupation: Singer-songwriter

Dieudonné Larose (5 June 1945 – 8 January 2026) was a Haitian singer-songwriter.

Larose was well known for his composition of konpa music Was a part Of Dp Express group, native to his home country of Haiti.

Larose died in of natural causes in Quebec, Canada on 8 January 2026, at the age of 80.
