= WAYF Boys =

South Korean boy band

- Origin: Seoul, South Korea
- Genres: K-pop; hip-hop; R&B
- Years active: 2026–present
- Labels: WAYF; Interscope
- Members: Anderson; Andrew; Junmyeong; Ryan; Samuel

WAYF Boys (Korean: 웨이프 보이즈) is a South Korean boy band formed in 2026. The band consists of five members: Anderson, Andrew, Junmyeong, Ryan, and Samuel. The first boy band formed and managed by WAYF, the record label founded by South Korean producer Czaer, they debuted on August 7, 2026 with the single "WAYF Boys Do".

== Name ==
The group’s name has two meanings: it refers to its label and agency, WAYF (an acronym for Where Art Yields Freedom), and also stands for We Are Your Friend. WAYF said the name reflects its aim to champion artistic freedom and create closer connections between the artists and their fans.

== History ==
=== Pre-debut activities and formation ===
WAYF Boys during a photoshoot for Marie Claire Korea in September 2026.

Before the formation of WAYF Boys, all five members had appeared on reality competition survival shows. Andrew and Ryan competed on Mnet's 2025 show Boys II Planet, Junmyeong on SBS's 2025 show Be My Boyz, Anderson on SM Entertainment's NCT Universe: Lastart, and Samuel on the eleventh season of Mnet's Show Me the Money in 2022. WAYF founder Czaer met Ryan while he was an SM Entertainment trainee, and Ryan became the first member to sign with the company. Ryan then brought in his friends Andrew, Anderson, Junmyeong, and Samuel, who had trained at YG, SM, KOZ, and More Vision, to join the group.

The group launched its social media accounts in June 2026 and gained one million followers by the following month, drawing early attention with an a cappella cover of Michael Jackson's "Human Nature" on YouTube that surpassed 113,000 views in less than a month. Their first Instagram post featured the members, many of them shirtless, with their faces covered by a character named Arlo. Later posts included bathroom selfies, footage of the members going out and clubbing, and a video of two members physically fighting. They performed together for the first time at Waterbomb Seoul 2026, where they performed songs that later became their debut single and second single to an enthusiastic audience response.

=== 2026–present: Debut with "WAYF Boys Do" ===
WAYF Boys released their debut single, "WAYF Boys Do", on August 7, 2026. The song drew attention and heated responses for its playful music video, which features a scene of the members pulling down their pants in front of the camera, as well as drawing attention for the lyric "half vanilla, fuck ICE." The members helped shape the artwork and visuals, while Anderson handled the stage direction and choreography. Less than a month later, they signed with Interscope Records on August 14. WAYF founder Czaer said the deal came "incredibly fast," as they had planned to sign the group with a US label within a year. Three weeks after their debut, they released their second single, "Swag,"on August 28, 2026, accompanied by a DIY-style music video documenting its production. In September 2026, they announced their third single, teasing the phrases "10.02" and "A4M" ahead of its release.

They released "A4M" on October 2, 2026, performing at 2026 ESKARA: Waves of Greens at Sungkyunkwan University a day prior. Its playful and humorous production differed from the hip-hop and R&B influences of "WAYF Boys Do" and "Swag," while its music video used a B movie concept. That same month, they performed at KOOM Live 2026 in New York City, later holding a fan event at Leon’s Bagels, where they served customers and met fans, and visited the Empire State Building.

== Artistry ==
WAYF Boys have described their identity as "Nu K-pop," reflecting their desire to move beyond expectations and create something that represents them. WAYF founder Czaer said he wanted the company to help artists find their own styles, and described WAYF Boys as an example of Nu K-pop creating its own culture using K-pop and pulling from R&B and hip-hop. He has also said that although the group is rooted in hip-hop, they would not be "tied to a single genre or fixed release schedule." The Dong-A Ilbo described the group as sharing with Big Hit's Cortis and More Vision's Lngshot an emphasis on creative agency and autonomy, adding that WAYF Boys would need to distinguish themselves from the groups and innovate to establish Nu K-pop.

== Members ==
- Anderson (앤더슨)
- Andrew (앤드류)
- Junmyeong (준명)
- Ryan (라이언)
- Samuel (사무엘)

== Discography ==
=== Singles ===
List of singles, showing year released and album name
Title	Year	Album
"WAYF Boys Do"	2026	Non-album singles
"Swag"	2026	Non-album singles
"A4M"	2026	Non-album singles
