= Michelangelo Zurletti =

Italian music critic (1937–2026)

- Born: 1937; Saluzzo, Italy
- Died: 30 March 2026 (aged 89)
- Occupation: Music critic

Michelangelo Zurletti (1937 – 30 March 2026) was an Italian music critic for La Repubblica. He died on 30 March 2026, at the age of 89.
