= Mihail Secichin =

Moldovan conductor, pianist and pedagogue (1943–2026)

Mihail Secichin (31 March 1943 – 5 March 2026) was a Moldovan conductor, pianist and pedagogue. He was best known for his long association with the National Theatre of Opera and Ballet "Maria Bieșu" in Chișinău, where he was one of the principal conductors from 1989 and served as chief conductor and artistic director from 1990 to 1992, and for his teaching at the Academy of Music, Theatre and Fine Arts.

== Early life and education ==
Secichin was born in Kharkiv, Ukrainian SSR, on 31 March 1943. He received his first music lessons from his mother and studied piano at the Kharkiv Special Music School under Regina Horowitz, sister of pianist Vladimir Horowitz. In 1966, he graduated from the Kharkiv Conservatory as a pianist. He then studied conducting, first at the Kharkiv Institute of Arts and later at the Kyiv State Conservatory, followed by postgraduate training with the conductor Stepan Turchak.

== Career ==
After completing his conducting studies, Secichin worked in Ukraine as assistant conductor of the Zaporizhzhia Philharmonic and later at the opera theatre in Donetsk, where he built a repertoire of about 75 opera and ballet productions. In 1971, he took part in the All-Union Conductors' Competition in Moscow.

In 1988, Secichin moved to Chișinău at the invitation of rector Constantin Rusnac, joining the Moldovan State Conservatory as a teacher of piano and opera training. At the conservatory, he also led the student symphony orchestra and was among the first conductors of the Opera Studio.

At the National Theatre of Opera and Ballet in Chișinău, Secichin was one of the theatre's principal conductors from 1989 and chief conductor and artistic director from 1990 to 1992. He later worked extensively with the Serghei Lunchevici National Philharmonic, whose symphony orchestra he conducted from 2008 to 2013. In Romania, he served as conductor and later chief conductor of the symphony orchestra in Botoșani from 1998 to 2013.

Secichin conducted more than 20 opera and ballet productions in Moldova from 1988 onward, along with around 200 chamber-vocal, chamber-instrumental and symphonic works. He was a contributor to the early development of the Moldovan Youth Orchestra.

== Death ==
Secichin died on 5 March 2026, at the age of 82.

== Honours ==
In 1996, Secichin received the honorary title Maestru în Artă. In 2018, he was awarded the title Artist al Poporului al Republicii Moldova.
