= Marikena Monti =

Argentine actress (1943–2026)

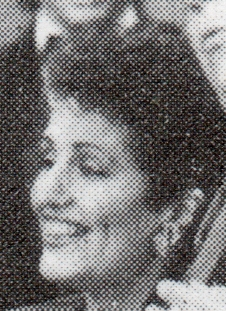
- Monti in the 1980s
- Born: María Eugenia Monti; May 22, 1943
- Died: January 17, 2026 (aged 82)
- Occupations: Singer, actress

Marikena Monti (May 22, 1943 – January 17, 2026) was an Argentine singer and actress. She died on January 17, 2026, at the age of 82.
