= Yuhz =

South Korean boy band

- Also known as: Your Hertz
- Origin: Seoul, South Korea
- Genre: K-pop
- Years active: 2026–present
- Label: Pinnacle
- Members: Bohyeon; Hyo; Haruto; Junseong; Jaeil; Kai; Yeontae; Sechan

Yuhz (Korean: 유어즈; RR: Yueojeu; stylized in all caps) is a South Korean boy group formed through SBS's survival show B:My Boyz and managed by Pinnacle Entertainment. The group consists of eight members: Bohyeon, Hyo, Haruto, Junseong, Jaeil, Kai, Yeontae, and Sechan. They debuted on May 7, 2026, with the single album Orange Record.

== Name ==
The group name Yuhz is an abbreviation of "Your Hertz". The name reflects the message of hope as the members sing the many stories of the world in their journey around the globe, by gathering scattered waves throughout the world, coming together into one single vibration.

== History ==
=== Formation through B:My Boyz and other activities ===
YUHZ was formed through SBS's reality competition series B:My Boyz, which aired from June 21 to August 30, 2025. The show had 30 contestants compete to debut for a spot in a new global boy group. Out of the 30 trainees, only the top eight would make the final lineup. All the debut members were announced in the finale episode, which was broadcast live on August 30, 2025, and they'll be active for five years after debut under Pinnacle Entertainment.

Before appearing on the program, several members had already been active in the entertainment industry. In 2023, Hyo took part in the Mnet survival show Boys Planet, but was eliminated in the fifth episode, after ranking 86th. In 2024, Lee Yeon-tae and Kim Bo-hyeon took part in the JTBC survival show Project 7. They were both eliminated in the first episode, prior to the official competition, without having received a rank from the show.

=== 2026: Debut with Orange Record, B ===
On April 19, 2026, it was announced that they would make their official debut on May 7, with the single album Orange Record, alongside its lead single "Rush Rush".

On August 25, Pinnacle Entertainment announced that Yuhz member Haruto would be taking a temporary hiatus from group activities due to health-related reasons. The agency stated that the decision was made with the artist's health as the top priority. As a result, he would not be able to participate in the next album activities, scheduled for the second half of the year. Yuhz will continue its activities and promotions as a seven-member group.

On October 5, it was announced that the group's first EP B would be released on October 21, alongside its lead single "B.B.B".

== Members ==
- Bohyeon (보현)
- Hyo (효)
- Haruto (하루토)
- Junseong (준성)
- Jaeil (재일)
- Kai (카이)
- Yeontae (연태)
- Sechan (세찬)

== Discography ==
=== Extended plays ===
| Title | Details | Peak chart positions | Sales |
| Title | Details | KOR | Sales |
|---|---|---|---|
| B | Released: October 21, 2026; Label: Pinnacle; Formats: CD, digital download, streaming; Track listing: 1. "Here We Go"; 2. "B.B.B"; 3. "Moonlight"; 4. "To My Galaxy" | 26 | KOR: 27,175 |

=== Single albums ===
List of albums, showing selected details, selected chart positions, and sales figures
| Title | Details | Peak chart positions | Sales |
| Title | Details | KOR | Sales |
|---|---|---|---|
| Orange Record | Released: May 7, 2026; Label: Pinnacle; Formats: CD, digital download, streaming; Track listing: 1. "Rush Rush"; 2. "Supalove" | 23 | KOR: 19,904 |

=== Singles ===
List of singles, showing year released, selected chart positions, and name of the album
| Title | Year | Peak chart positions | Album |
| Title | Year | KOR DL | Album |
|---|---|---|---|
| "Rush Rush" | 2026 | 162 | Orange Record |
| "B.B.B" | 2026 | — | B |
"—" denotes a recording that did not chart.

== Videography ==
=== Music videos ===
| Title | Year | Director(s) | Ref. |
|---|---|---|---|
| "Rush Rush" | 2026 | Kang Min-gi | |
| "Here We Go" | 2026 | Moswantd | |
| "B.B.B" | 2026 | Lee Min-jun, Lee Ha-young (Moswantd) | |

== Filmography ==
=== Reality shows ===
| Year | Title | Notes | Ref. |
|---|---|---|---|
| 2025 | B:My Boyz | Reality competition show determining Yuhz's members | |
