= Abdelwahab Doukkali =

Moroccan composer and performer (1941–2026)

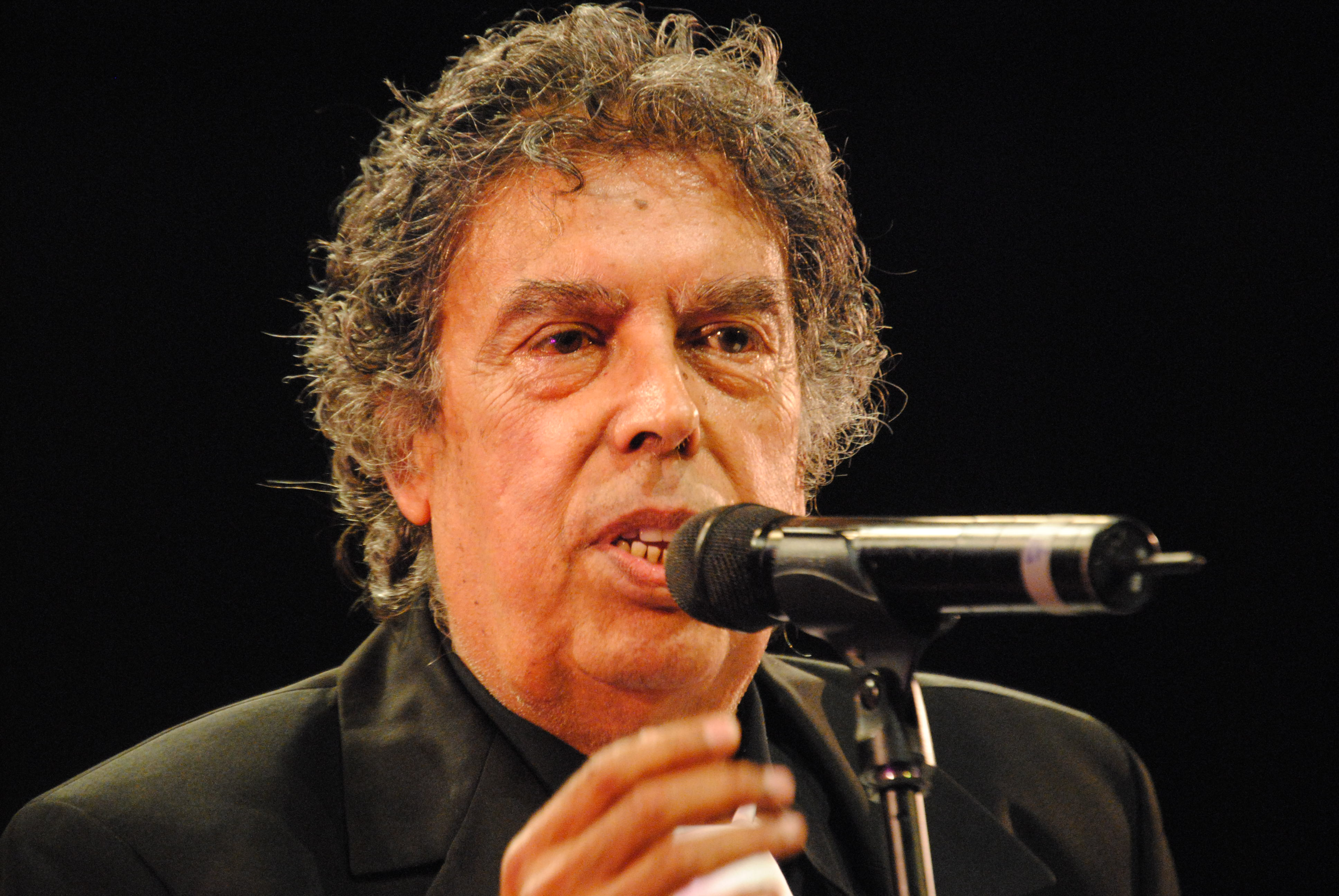
Doukkali in 2013

Abdelouahab Doukkali (Arabic: عبد الوهاب الدكالي; 2 January 1941 – 8 May 2026) was a Moroccan composer and performer. He was born in Fes, one of the 13 children of a conservative family. At the age of 18, in 1959, he went to Rabat, where he worked briefly at RTM (Radio Television Maroc), but upon seeing his boredom, colleagues encouraged him to move to Casablanca where he first entered the music culture. From 1959 to 1962 he pursued careers in both theatre and radio. He toured Algeria in 1962, then left Morocco and settled in Cairo. During his three years in Egypt, he gained popularity outside North Africa, then returned to Morocco in 1965. Doukkali continued to write and perform music through the 1990s, including popularly acclaimed songs such as Kān yā mākān and Montparnasse. His works include songs in both Moroccan dialect as well as literary Arabic. He was the recipient of numerous awards and honors, including the Mérite et Dévouement français in 2004, the Grand Prix Humanitaire de France in 2006, and medals from both Pope John Paul II and Pope Benedict XVI. His music has been featured in several films from Morocco.

Doukkali died on 8 May 2026, at the age of 85.

== Filmography ==
- Vaincre pour Vivre (Life is a Struggle), 1968, 105 min, B&W, 35mm

== See also ==
- Abdelhadi Belkhayat
