= Alvin L =

Brazilian singer-songwriter (1959–2026)

- Born: Arnaldo Jose Lima Santos; April 1, 1959; Salvador, Bahia, Brazil
- Died: April 5, 2026 (aged 67) Rio de Janeiro, Brazil
- Genres: Punk; new wave; rock
- Occupations: Singer; songwriter
- Instrument: Guitar
- Years active: Late 1970s–2026

Arnaldo Jose Lima Santos (April 1, 1959 – April 5, 2026), better known by the stage name Alvin L, was a Brazilian musician and songwriter.

His more than 200 published compositions were recorded by a wide range of artists, from Milton Nascimento to Sandy & Junior.

== Life and career ==
Alvin was born in Salvador but was registered in Rio de Janeiro. A guitarist and songwriter, he began his career in the late 1970s with the punk group Vândalos. He later formed Rapazes de Vida Fácil, which was more influenced by new wave; the band released a single in 1982 through PolyGram and had a major hit with the song "Adriana na Piscina." He also experimented with the band Brasil Palace.

In 1990, he became the primary songwriter for the band Sex Beatles, which released two albums, Automobília and Mondo Passionale, during the 1990s. In addition to Alvin on guitar, the group included vocalist Cris Braun, guitarist Ivan Mariz, bassist Vicente Tardin, and drummer Marcelo Martins. Dado Villa-Lobos, then a member of Legião Urbana, performed with the Sex Beatles; however, to avoid contractual conflicts, he used a pseudonym and obscured his face during their performance at the Circo Voador.

Throughout his career, Alvin distinguished himself as a songwriter for other performers, most notably Marina Lima ("Eu Não Sei Dançar," "Stromboli," "Deve Ser Assim," "Na Minha Mão," and others), Capital Inicial ("Natasha," "Mickey Mouse em Moscou," "Todos os Lados," "Eu Vou Estar," "Tudo que Vai," and others), Leila Pinheiro (who recorded three of his songs on the album Na Ponta da Língua), as well as Belô Velloso ("Menos Carnaval"), Toni Platão ("Tudo que Vai"), and Ana Carolina ("Perder Tempo com Você").

His first solo album, Alvin, was released in 1997 by BMG, produced by Liminha. The album featured both re-recordings and new material.

In 2020, he released his first book, a thriller titled O Veneno dos Pequenos Detalhes (The Poison of Small Details).

In 2021, he provided vocals for the song "Kilimanjaro" on Marina Lima's EP Motim.

Alvin died from a heart attack while sleeping on April 5, 2026, at the age of 67.
