= Zalek =

Colombian singer (1995–2026)

Eduardo Alfonso Orozco Mantilla (July 28, 1995 – March 10, 2026), better known as Zalek, was a Colombian singer and composer.

== Life and career ==
Mantilla was born in Barranquilla on July 28, 1995. He studied business administration at the Simón Bolívar University. He began composing covers of the urban and trap genre that was influenced by Aristas Carín León and Maluma with their single releases: Party Coquette, Muertos vivientes and ¿Qué pasó?.

He composed songs in the genres of corridos, mariachis and tropipop with his singles: Batería baja, BM and Ay amor, the latter released in 2024 reaching thousands of reproductions on various music platforms, which gained notoriety.

=== Death ===
On March 10, 2026, he died in a traffic collision while driving his high-end motorcycle on an avenue in Medellín, he crashed with a vehicle that was parked, due to his high impact he had several severe blows which minutes later he arrived without vital signs in a local clinic that was confirmed by his manager Gus Rincón.
