= Utsav Charan Das =

Indian dancer (1945/1946–2026)

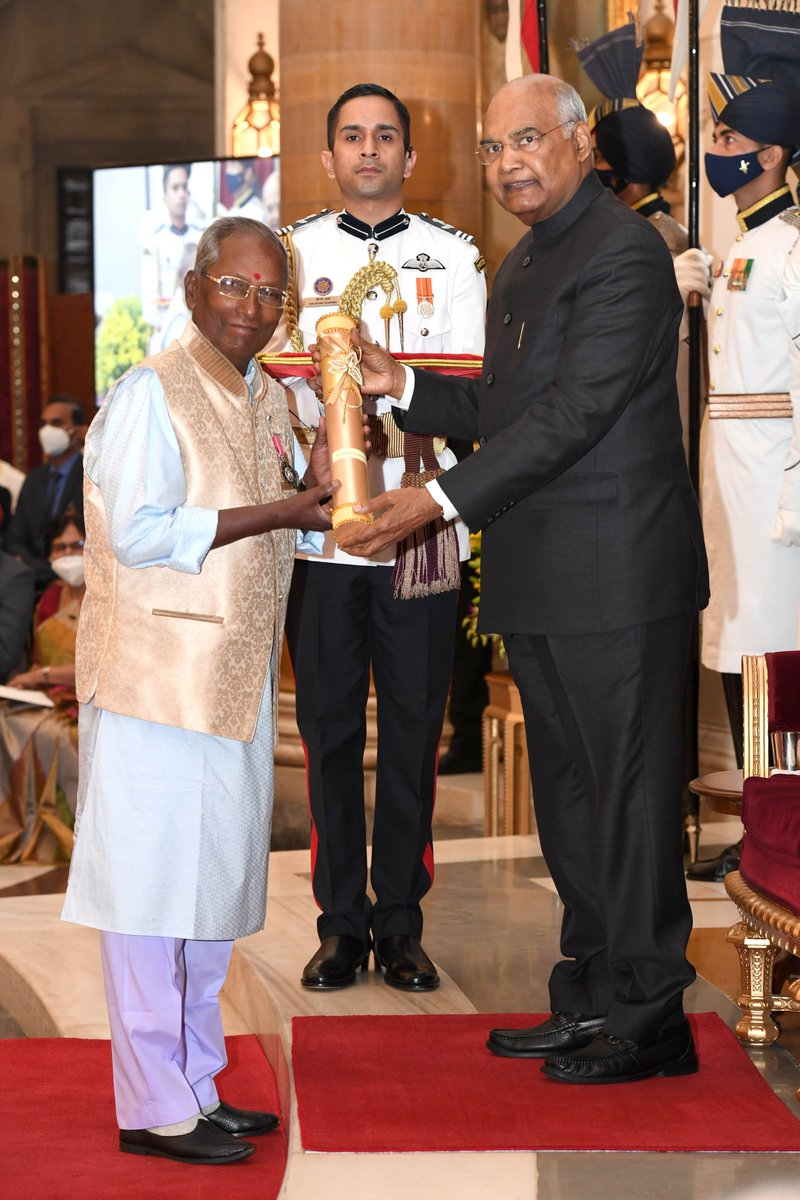
- Das receiving Padma Shri from President Ram Nath Kovind
- Born: 1945 or 1946; Mania, Orissa Province, British India
- Died: 26 February 2026 (aged 80); Choudwar, Cuttack district, Odisha, India
- Occupations: Dancer, music composer, playwright
- Awards: Padma Shri

Utsav Charan Das (1945 or 1946 – 26 February 2026) was an Indian dancer. He was also a lyricist, music composer and playwright. In 2020, he was awarded Padma Shri by the Indian government for his contribution in Arts.

== Early life and education ==
Das was from Mania village in Orissa Province. He was a matriculate.

== Career ==
Das worked as a stenographer in the state government. In 1960, he performed Ghoda Nacha for the first time with his father. He wrote many lyrical plays namely Bhai Juntia, Krushna Avatar, Mahisa Nasini, Gambhiribije, Khaiunjula, Kelikadamb, Rangakeli and Gujuna. He wrote many songs on health problems and social initiatives like AIDS, malaria, leprosy prevention, Swachh Bharat, Beti Bachao Beti Padhao.

== Death ==
Das died on 26 February 2026, at the age of 80.

== Awards ==
- Padma Shri
- Odisha Sangeet Natak Akademi Award
