= Ariel (Russian band) =

Russian pop/rock band from Chelyabinsk

Ariel Ариэль
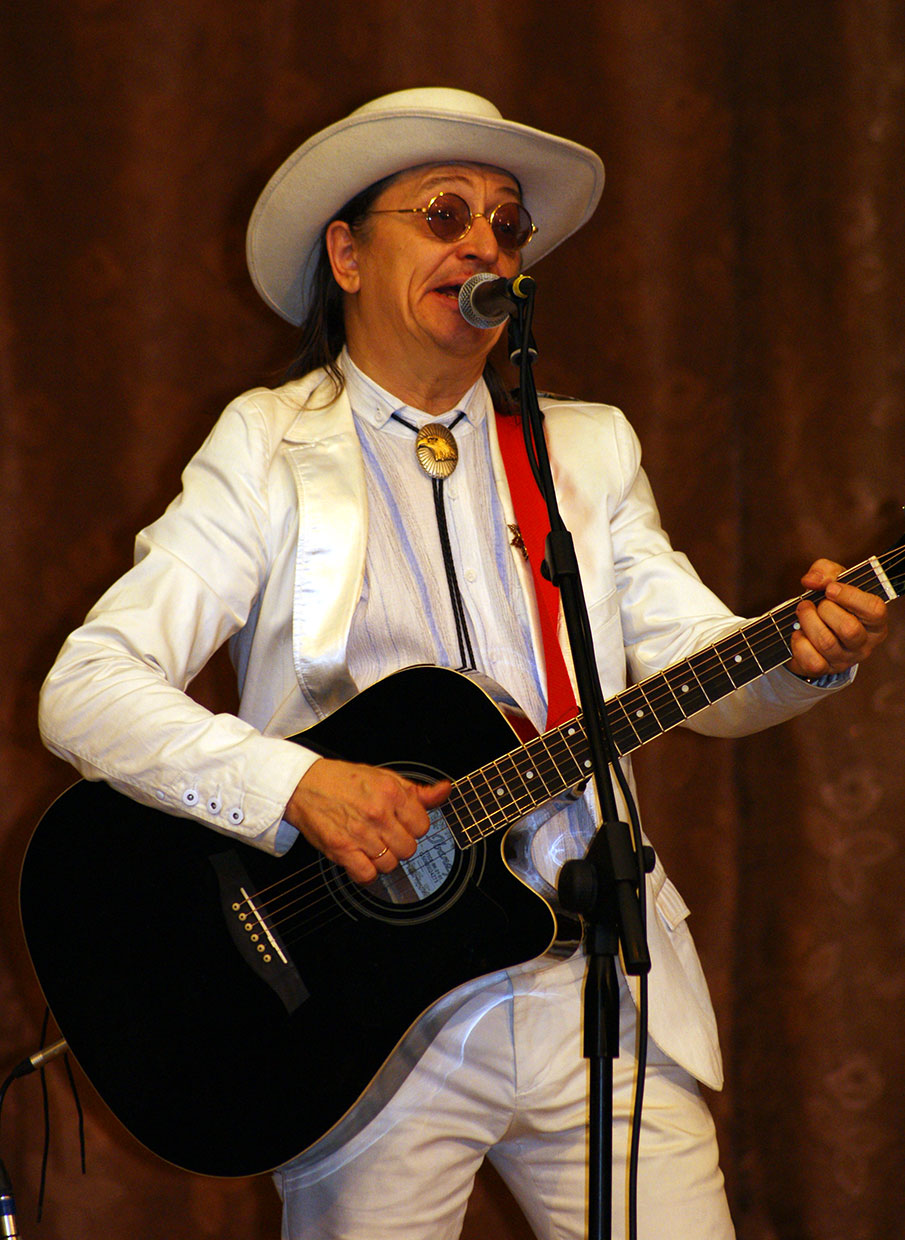
- Yarushin in 2008

Background information
- Origin: Chelyabinsk, Russia
- Genres: Folk rock; Pop; Funk rock
- Years active: 1968–present
- Members: Moscow formation "Ariel": Valery Yarushin; Alexander Trapeznikov; Victor Litvinov; Anatoly Litvinov Chelyabinsk formation "Ariel": Boris Kaplun; Rostislav Gepp; Alexander Tybelius; Oleg Gordeev
- Past members: Lev Fidelman, Lev Ratner, Valeriy Slepukhin, Viktor Kolesnikov, Vladimir Kindinov, Yevgeniy Smetannikov, Vyacheslav Bartashov, Lev Gurov†, Sergey Antonov†, Sergey Sharikov, Oleg Sterkhov, Valeriy Sundarev
- Website: mband.ru

Ariel (Russian: Ариэль, romanized: Ariel) are a "VIA" (pop/rock) band based in Chelyabinsk, Russia. They were formed in 1967 and headed by Valery Yarushin. From 1989 to the present day, they have been headed by Rostislav Gepp. The group emerged from a fusion of two earlier (1960s) ensembles, called Ariel and Allegro. Yarushin, who had been in charge of Allegro, became the manager of the new group. The band was popular during the Soviet era and won several awards. Their performances often made use of material of Russian folk music.

== History ==
The vocal-instrumental ensemble "Ariel" was created by student of the Chelyabinsk Music College Lev Fidelman in 1968. In early 1968, at the New Year's Eve, the first performance of the ensemble took place (at that time there was no name). It did not last long, as the director of the music school demanded that he stop it (only three songs were able to be sung). In 1968, there was a line-up that could give concerts. There was also a name. They did mostly cover versions of songs by The Beatles, The Monkees, The Tremeloes, The Turtles.

In 1970, at the initiative of the Komsomol District Committee of the Central District of the city of Chelyabinsk, three leading vocal and instrumental ensembles were invited to the creative meeting: Ariel, Allegro and Pilgrims. "Pilgrims" refused to attend the meeting, but a kind of creative competition took place among the ensembles "Ariel" and "Allegro", as a result of which only Ariel was created from two Chelyabinsk ensembles "Ariel" and "Allegro" (led by Valery Yarushin) Valery Yarushin was the leader of the band. The date of the formation of the ensemble was decided on November 7, 1970.

In December 1971, Ariel shared the first place with the Skomorokhi trio under the direction of Alexander Gradsky, at the Silver Strings competition, dedicated to the 750th anniversary of the city of Gorky.

"Ariel" is a laureate of the 5th All-Union Contest of Variety Artists (Moscow, 1974, first place).

"Ariel" performed at the Tbilisi Rock Festival out of competition in 1980.

The group often references Russian folklore. Some of their most famous songs are "Porushka — poranya", "Baba Yaga". On the account of "Ariel" - a number of conceptual stage productions, rock operas, including: "For the Russian Land", "Masters", "The Legend of Emelian Pugachev."

At different times, "Ariel" worked in different styles, but the genre base of the ensemble was always a Russian variant of folk-rock, implying the processing or stylization of popular Russian folk songs. Often the ensemble performs songs and a cappella ("Shumel kamysh") or accompanied by acoustic instruments.

Rostislav Gepp died on 24 February 2026, at the age of 74.

== Members ==
=== "Golden" Ariel ===
- Valery Yarushin (leader) - bass guitar, accordion, vocals, arrangement (1970–1989)
- Lev Gurov † - rhythm guitar, vocals.
- Boris Kaplun - drums, violin, vocal
- Rostislav Gepp †- piano, flute, vocal
- Sergei Sharikov - keyboards, vocals
- Sergei Antonov † - rhythm and lead guitar

=== Chelyabinsk Ariel ===
- Rostislav Gepp (leader) - keyboards, flute, vocals (1989–2026; his death)
- Boris Kaplun - drums, violin, vocal
- Alexander Tibelius - vocals, percussion
- Oleg Gordeev - rhythm and lead guitars, vocals

=== Moscow Ariel ===
- Valery Yarushin (leader) - bass guitar, vocals (from 1989 to present)
- Alexander Trapeznikov - guitars, vocals
- Victor Litvinov - keyboard, vocals
- Anatoly Litvinov - drums, vocals

== Discography ==
- 1975 — Ariel — S60-05891
- 1976 — Songs to the film "Mezhdu nebom i zemloy" — S60-07085-86
- 1978 — Russkiye kartinki — S60-08641
- 1978 — Skazaniye o Yemel'yane Pugachove — rok-opera
- 1980 — Na ostrove Buyane — S60-13891
- 1980 — Priglasheniye v gosti — C62-14857
- 1981 — Mastera — rok-oratoriya
- 1982 — Kazhdyy den tvoy — S60-16739
- 1983 — Utro planety, syuita — S60-20127 008
- 1985 — Za zemlyu Russkuyu — rok-duma
- 1990 — Lyubimaya, no chuzhaya — S60-31391 008 (Melodiya)
- 1993 — Privet (CD Krasniy Klin Music Records, Germaniya)
- 2000 — Shumel kamysh (CD)
- 2000 — Lyubimaya, no chuzhaya (CD)
- 2001 — Beatles in the russians (CD)
- 2001 — Cherez maydan (CD)
- 2005 — Doroga dlinoy v 35 (SD)
- 2008 — Ariel 40 (CD)
- 2011 — Vernomsya na ozora (SD)
- 2014 — Shumel kamysh (LP) PCRGLP002
