= Václav Hybš =

Czech musician, trumpeter and conductor (1935–2026)

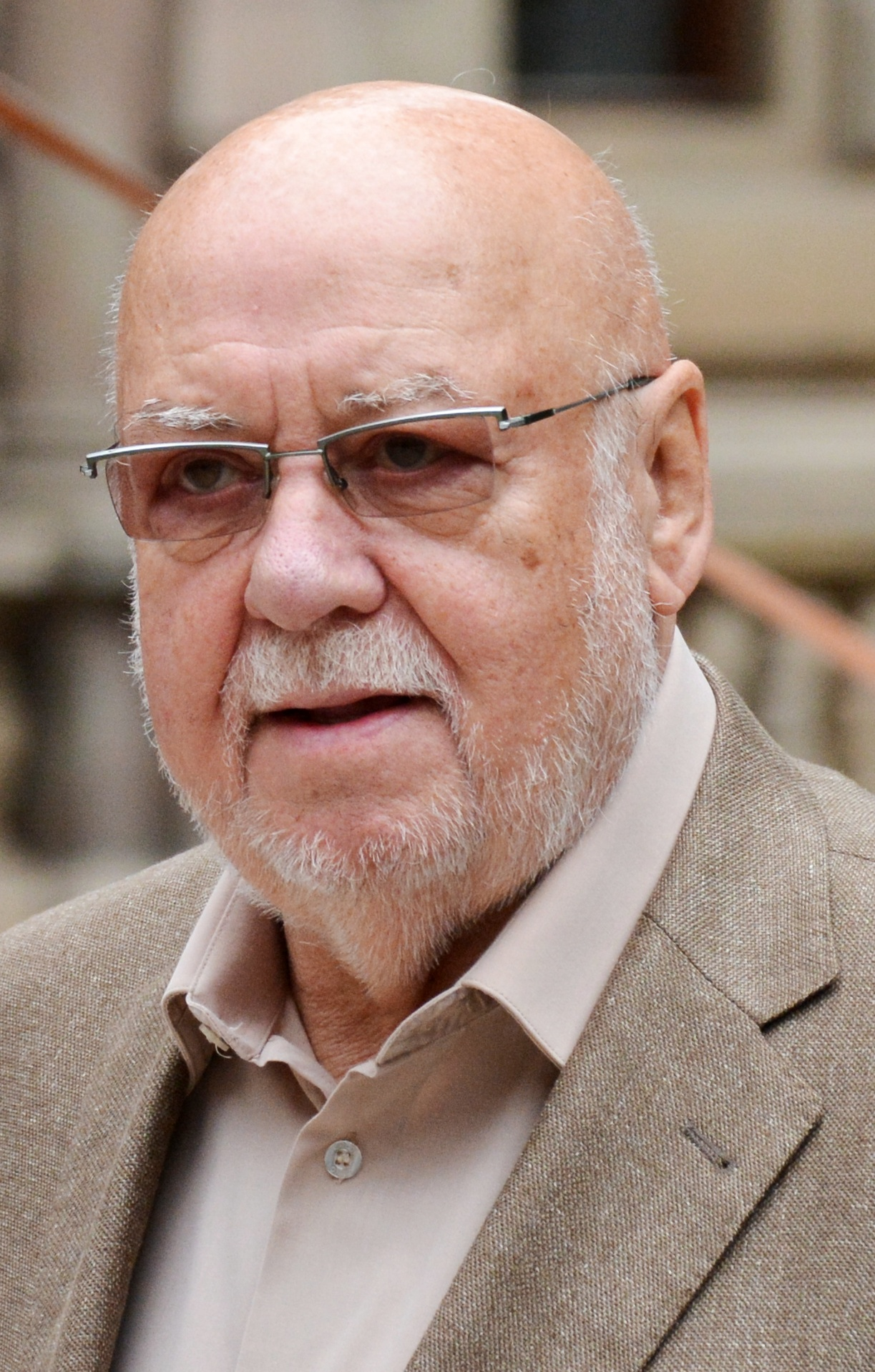
- Hybš in 2015
- Born: 3 June 1935; Police nad Metují, Czechoslovakia
- Died: 12 April 2026 (aged 90)
- Education: State Conservatory in Prague
- Occupations: Trumpeter, conductor, music arranger, bandleader
- Known for: Leadership of Václav Hybš Orchestra

Václav Hybš (3 June 1935 – 12 April 2026) was a Czech trumpeter, conductor, music arranger and bandleader.

== Early life and education ==
Hybš was born in Police nad Metují on 3 June 1935. He began learning music as a child and later studied trumpet at the State Conservatory in Prague.

== Career ==
During and after his conservatory studies, Hybš performed in several orchestras. He played in the spa orchestra in Poděbrady, joined Zdeněk Barták's orchestra in 1954, and later worked with the orchestra of Ladislav Bezubka. He also performed in entertainment settings including Circus Praga and Varieté Alhambra.

In 1960, Hybš became a member of the Dance Orchestra of Czechoslovak Radio, founded by Karel Krautgartner.

== Death ==
Hybš died on 12 April 2026, at the age of 90.

== Awards and recognition ==
In 1987, he was named the Merited Artist of Czechoslovakia.

In May 2005, the Czech Ministry of Culture awarded him the Artis Bohemiae Amicis medal for promoting Czech culture.

== Discography ==
- A jeho hosté (1976)
- Hybš hraje polku (1978)
- Václav Hybš a jeho hosté 2 – Malá sváteční hudba (1978)
- Hudební hostina Václava Hybše (1980)
- Václav Hybš hraje operetu (1981)
- Hybš hraje valčík (1984)
- České Vánoce (1990)
- Legenda: To nejlepší z padesáti let Orchestru Václava Hybše (2013)
- Hudební delikatesy (2014)
- 60 let Orchestru Václava Hybše (2019)
