= Mohamed Garfi =

Tunisian musicologist, composer and conductor (1948–2026)

- محمد القرفي
- Born: 17 November 1948; Tunis, French protectorate in Tunisia
- Died: 13 September 2026 (aged 77)
- Education: National Conservatory of Music; Schola Cantorum de Paris; Paris-Sorbonne University
- Occupations: Musicologist; Composer; Conductor

Mohamed Garfi (Arabic: محمد القرفي; 17 November 1948 – 13 September 2026) was a Tunisian musicologist, composer and conductor.

Garfi collaborated with several Tunisian musicians throughout his career, such as Hassen Doss. His son, Chadi Garfi, also became a conductor.

Garfi died on 13 September 2026, at the age of 77.

== Publications ==
- Les formes instrumentales dans la musique classique de Tunisie : étude comparative des formes arabo-turques (1996)
- Musique et spectacle : le théâtre lyrique arabe, esquisse d'un itinéraire (1847–1975) (2009)
