= Sajida Obaed =

Iraqi singer (1957–2026)

- ساجدة عبيد
- Born: 2 November 1957; Baghdad, Kingdom of Iraq
- Died: 4 April 2026 (aged 68)

Sajida Manna' Auda Shabib Al-Tamimi (Arabic: ساجدة مناع عودة شبيب التميمي; 2 November 1957 – 4 April 2026), known professionally as Sajida Obaed (Arabic: ساجدة عبيد), was an Iraqi singer.

== Life and career ==
Sajida Obaed was born on 2 November 1957 in Baghdad, Iraq to a Romani family. She later moved to Erbil in northern Iraq’s autonomous Kurdistan Region. Obaed began performing at the age of 12. Over the span of her career, she released six albums. Some of her most famous songs include Khala U Ya Khala (Aunt Oh Aunt) and Enkasret Al Shisha (The Shisha Broke).

Obaed died in Iraq on 4 April 2026 at the age of 68 following a battle with lung cancer.
