= Abdelhadi Belkhayat =

Moroccan singer (1940–2026)

Abdelhadi Belkhayat عبد الهادي بلخياط
- Born: Abdelhadi Belkhayat; 1940; Fez, Morocco
- Died: 30 January 2026 (aged 85)
- Genres: Moroccan music
- Occupations: Singer, songwriter
- Instrument: Luth

Abdelhadi Belkhayat (Arabic: عبد الهادي بلخياط; 1940 – 30 January 2026) was a Moroccan singer of Arabo-Andalusian and popular Moroccan music.

== Life and career ==
Abdelhadi Belkhayate was born in Fez in 1940. He left his hometown to settle in Casablanca.

He is mostly remembered for his song "Ya bent Nass" which has since been made famous again by many young Moroccan and Arab artists, also his music has been featured in several films from Morocco.

After such successful albums like "Ya Bent Nass", "Ya Dak L'insane", "Qitar Al Hayat" and "Alkamaro al-ahmar", he also released a spiritual-themed song "Al Mounfarija" based on Ibn Al Nahawi's famous poem as a response to king Hassan II request.

Belkhayat died on 30 January 2026, at the age of 85.

== See also ==
- Abdelwahab Doukkali
- Mohamed Rouicha
