= Guillermo Rendón García =

Colombian composer (1935–2026)

- Born: 25 March 1935; Manizales, Colombia
- Died: 16 January 2026 (aged 90); Manizales, Colombia
- Education: University of Caldas; Humboldt University of Berlin
- Occupations: Composer, organist

Guillermo Rendón García (25 March 1935 – 16 January 2026) was a Colombian composer and organist. He died on 16 January 2026, at the age of 90.
