= Tōsha Rosen VI =

Tōsha Rosen 六世藤舎呂船
- Born: Toshiaki Tachibana (橘利明); 1944 (age 80–81); Kyoto, Japan
- Genres: Traditional Japanese theatre and dance
- Occupations: Musician, songwriter, educator
- Instruments: Noh and Kabuki Tsuzumi, ōtsuzumi, taiko, many others
- Years active: 1954-present

Tōsha Rosen VI (六世藤舎呂船, Rokusei Tōsha Rosen) (born 1944) is a Japanese percussionist in the tradition of traditional Japanese dance and drama, the sixth iemoto (head) of the Tōsha school. He specializes in the taiko and tsuzumi, and performs as a member or leader of the hayashi (musical accompanists) in the kabuki theatre, as well as in a variety of other traditional contexts.

Born in 1944, his father was the 4th Tōsha Rosen. He began studying percussion under his father at the age of six, focusing upon the ko-tsuzumi, a small hand-drum. He later studied taiko under the 5th Tōsha Rosen, nagauta shamisen under Kondō Chōjūrō II, Kondō Ayako, and Kineya Katsuroku, and kiyomoto-bushi under Kiyomoto Jukuni-tayū.

He made his first appearance on stage in 1954, at the Kyoto Gion Kaburenjō (Song and Dance Practice Hall), under the name Tōsha Toshiaki. He then took up the name Tōsha Naritoshi in 1968, and made his kabuki debut in April the following year, performing for the dance piece Renjishi at the Kabuki-za in Tokyo. He succeeded to the name Tōsha Rosen, and the position as iemoto of the school, in September 1986.

== Discography ==
- Tsuzumi (music CD; various artists; 1 disc; 70 min; JAN:4988003253592). King Records. December 6, 2000. ASIN B00005HPI7.
- Nihon no taiko Besuto [The Best of Japanese Drums] (music CD; various artists; 1 disc; 58 min; JAN:4988003402051). King Records. May 11, 2011. ASIN B004LEE3PY.
- Edo no hana! korega kabuki no BGM da!!—Kabuki hayashi senshu [Flower of Edo! This is Kabuki's BGM!—Selection of Kabuki Accompaniment] (music CD; various artists; 2 discs; 148 min; JAN:4988003263898). King Records. September 5, 2001. ASIN B00005MIDH.
- Edo no hana! korega kabuki no meikyoku da!!—Kabuki hayashi senshu [Flower of Edo! This is a masterpiece of Kabuk!!—Nagauta masterpiece collection] (music CD; various artists; 1 disc; 71 min; JAN:4988003263881). King Records. September 5, 2001. ASIN B00005MIDG.
- Imafuji Masatarō sakuhinshu (5)—No, Kyogen [Works of Masatarō Imafuji—No, Kyogen] (music CD; various artists; 1 disc; 52 min; JAN:4519239014864). Vol. 5. Japan Traditional Cultures Foundation. March 4, 2009. ASIN B001O2HL3W.
