= Rainelle Krause =

American coloratura soprano (1987–2026)

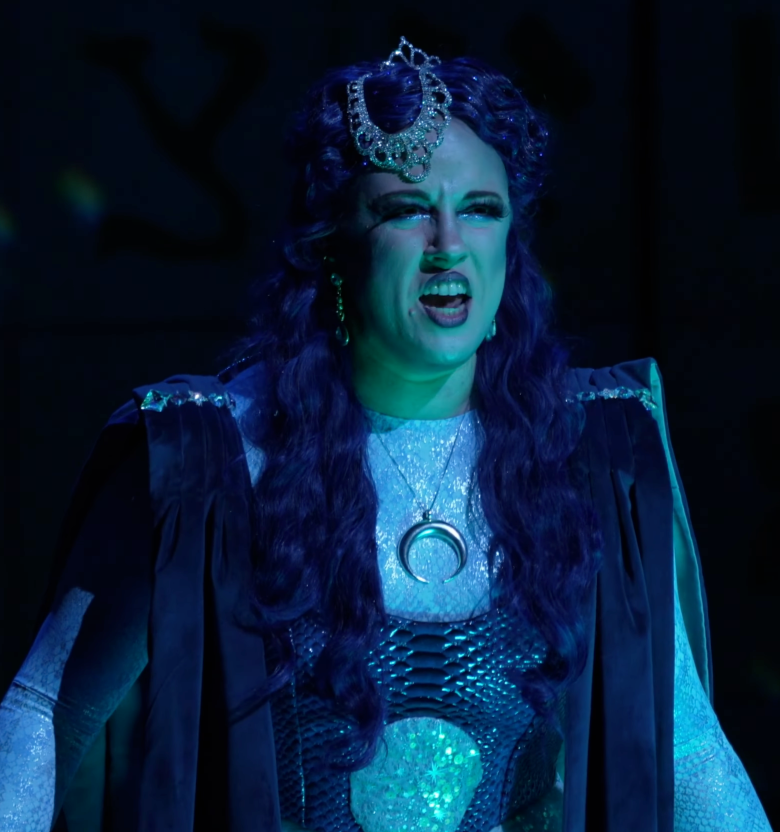
- Krause performing in Mozart's The Magic Flute at the Atlanta Opera in 2024

Background information
- Born: December 14, 1987; Tampa, Florida, U.S.
- Died: March 16, 2026 (aged 38) Fort Worth, Texas, U.S.
- Genre: Opera
- Instrument: Coloratura soprano
- Spouse: Ryan Krause (m. 2010)

Rainelle Sara Krause (December 14, 1987 – March 16, 2026) was an American opera singer and aerialist, known for her combination of coloratura soprano and aerial silks performance. Her signature piece was the Queen of the Night aria, "Der Hölle Rache kocht in meinem Herzen", from Mozart's The Magic Flute.

== Early life and career ==
Krause was born in Tampa, Florida, on December 14, 1987, and grew up in Bloomington, Indiana. She received her Bachelor of Music and Master of Music in vocal performance at the Jacobs School of Music at Indiana University in Bloomington.

After graduating, she travelled to Europe and performed in opera houses such as the English National Opera, the Berlin State Opera, the Dutch National Opera, the Royal Danish Theatre, and Theater Basel, among many others.

In July 2020, Krause's singing the "Queen of the Night aria" while practicing acrobatics and aerial silks went viral. In April 2025, at the Nashville Opera, she performed as Lucia in Donizetti's opera Lucia di Lammermoor. Later that year, in September, she was recorded and filmed singing the "Queen of the Night aria" at the English National Opera during the one-off performance, Mozart's Women: A Musical Journey, for the television channel Sky Arts. By October 2025, Krause had performed the role of the Queen of the Night in more than 145 performances of The Magic Flute. In December 2025, she made her Metropolitan Opera debut, again singing the Queen of the Night.

== Personal life ==
In 2010, she married Ryan Krause.

Rainelle Krause died on March 16, 2026, after a short hospitalization in Fort Worth, Texas, at the age of 38. Prior to her death, she had been scheduled to perform The Magic Flute at the Santa Fe Opera in the summer of 2026.
