= Tōsha Meishō =

Japanese musician (1941–2026)

Tōsha Meishō 藤舎名生
- Born: Isao Nakagawa (中川勲); 1941; Tokyo, Japan
- Died: 4 February 2026 (aged 84) Kyoto, Japan
- Genres: Traditional Japanese theatre and dance
- Occupation: Musician
- Instruments: Noh and Kabuki Tsuzumi, ōtsuzumi, taiko, many others
- Years active: 1963–2026

Tōsha Meishō (藤舎名生) (1941 – 4 February 2026) was a Japanese hayashi musician, one of a long line of Tōsha school musicians specializing in providing musical accompaniment in the kabuki theatre.

== Life and career ==
Born in 1941, he began studying under his father, Tōsha Shūhō, from around the age of six. In 1958, he took on the name Tōsha Suihō, and made his first appearance onstage five years later, in a June production of "Ō-Edo Shuten-dōji" at the Kabuki-za.

Meishō was granted a number of awards, including the Osaka Prefecture Citizens' Arts Award in 1978, and the Agency for Cultural Affairs' Special Award for the Promotion of Creative Arts in 1979 and 1982; in the latter year he also won the Kyoto Rookie Award. Four years later, he won the Agency for Creative Affairs' Arts Festival Award for Excellency for his performance "Flute of Four Seasons" (四季の笛, Shiki no fue).

He officially succeeded to the name Tōsha Meishō in 1989, becoming the second in the lineage to hold that name. A number of his relatives are also active musicians in kabuki hayashi or other traditional forms.

Meisho died on 4 February 2026, at the age of 84.
