= Recycled composite components =

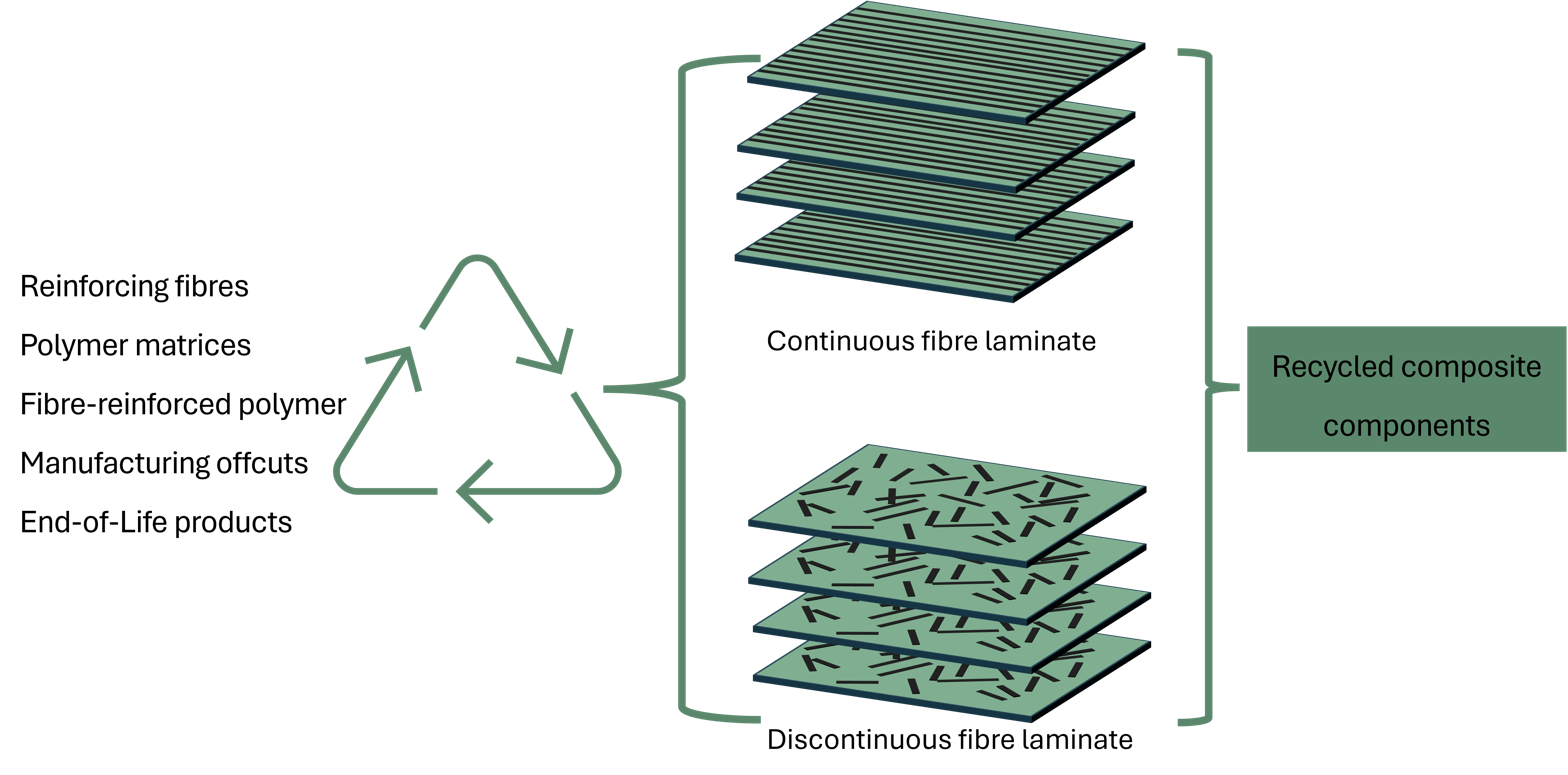
Conceptual illustration of recycled composite components

Recycled composite components are engineering components manufactured wholly or partly from recycled composite materials. These components are manufactured using reclaimed reinforcing fibres, recycled polymer matrices, repurposed fibre-reinforced polymer materials, or manufacturing offcuts. These components are manufactured from production scrap, end-of-life composite structures, or recovered composite feedstocks through reuse, remanufacturing, or recycling processes. They are increasingly used in industries including aerospace, automotive, construction, and the marine sector.

Unlike conventional composite recycling, which primarily focuses on recovering constituent materials or reducing waste, recycled composite components focus on manufacturing new engineering products from recycled composite feedstocks. Depending on the feedstock, manufacturing process, and design requirements, these components may be used in non-structural, semi-structural, or structural applications.

Growing environmental concerns, increasingly stringent waste-management regulations, and demand for lightweight engineering materials have driven research into recycled composite components. Advances in manufacturing methods, including compression moulding and discontinuous fibre processing, have expanded the range of engineering applications for recycled composite materials.

== Sources of recycled materials ==
The materials used to manufacture recycled composite components are primarily obtained from manufacturing waste and end-of-life composite structures. Manufacturing waste is generated during the production of composite parts and includes offcuts, ply-cutting skeletons, trimming waste, end-of-roll materials, expired prepregs, and rejected components that do not meet quality requirements. Because these materials often retain much of their original fibre architecture and polymer matrix, they can frequently be reused or remanufactured into new composite components with minimal additional processing, reducing material waste and improving resource efficiency.

End-of-life composite waste is produced when composite structures reach the end of their service life. Common sources include aircraft structures, wind turbine blades, marine structures, sporting goods, automobile and construction materials. Depending on the condition of the recovered material, these composites may be directly repurposed or processed through mechanical, thermal, or chemical recycling to recover fibres, matrices, or composite feedstocks for manufacturing new components.

== Waste hierarchy ==
Composite waste management generally follows the waste hierarchy, a framework that ranks waste-management strategies according to their environmental preference. The hierarchy prioritises waste prevention, followed by reuse, recycling, energy recovery, and disposal, with the objective of maximising resource efficiency while minimising environmental impacts.

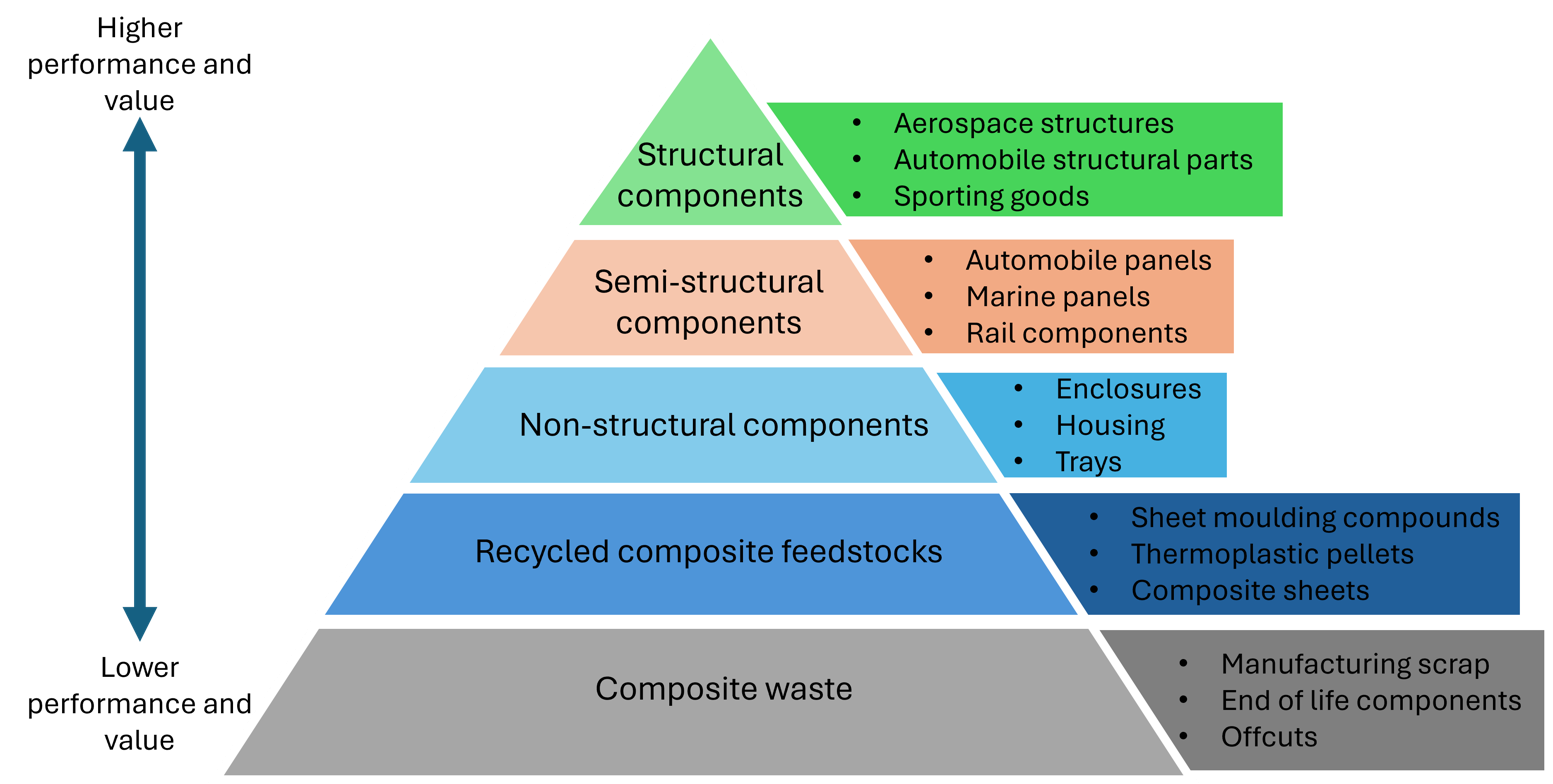
Conceptual hierarchy of recycled composite components illustrating the progression from composite waste to structural engineering applications.

=== Waste prevention ===
Waste prevention represents the highest priority within the waste hierarchy. It focuses on reducing the generation of composite waste through improved product design, optimised manufacturing processes, efficient material utilisation, and extending product service life through repurposing.

=== Reuse ===
Reuse is the next preferred option and involves employing composite materials or manufacturing offcuts again with minimal processing while retaining much of their original material value. In composite manufacturing, uncured prepreg offcuts and production scrap can be repurposed directly into new engineering components without separating the reinforcing fibres from the polymer matrix.

=== Recycling ===
When direct reuse is not feasible, recycling is used to recover valuable constituents from composite waste. Recycling methods are generally classified as mechanical, thermal, and chemical processes, which recover reinforcing fibres, polymer matrices, or both for use in the manufacture of new composite products.

=== Energy recovery ===
Energy recovery utilises the calorific value of polymer matrices through controlled thermal treatment when material recovery is impractical. Although this process recovers energy, it does not preserve the material value of the composite constituents.

=== Disposal ===
Disposal, primarily through landfill, is considered the least preferred waste-management option because it permanently removes valuable materials from the resource cycle and is associated with increasing environmental and regulatory concerns. Consequently, research and industrial practice have increasingly focused on higher levels of the waste hierarchy to support circular economy principles in the composites industry.

== Manufacturing methods ==
Recycled composite components are manufactured using processes that depend on the type, condition, and form of the recovered composite material. Manufacturing methods generally include the direct reuse of production waste or the reprocessing of recovered materials through mechanical, thermal, or chemical recycling techniques. The selected method influences the composition, mechanical properties, and intended application of the final component.

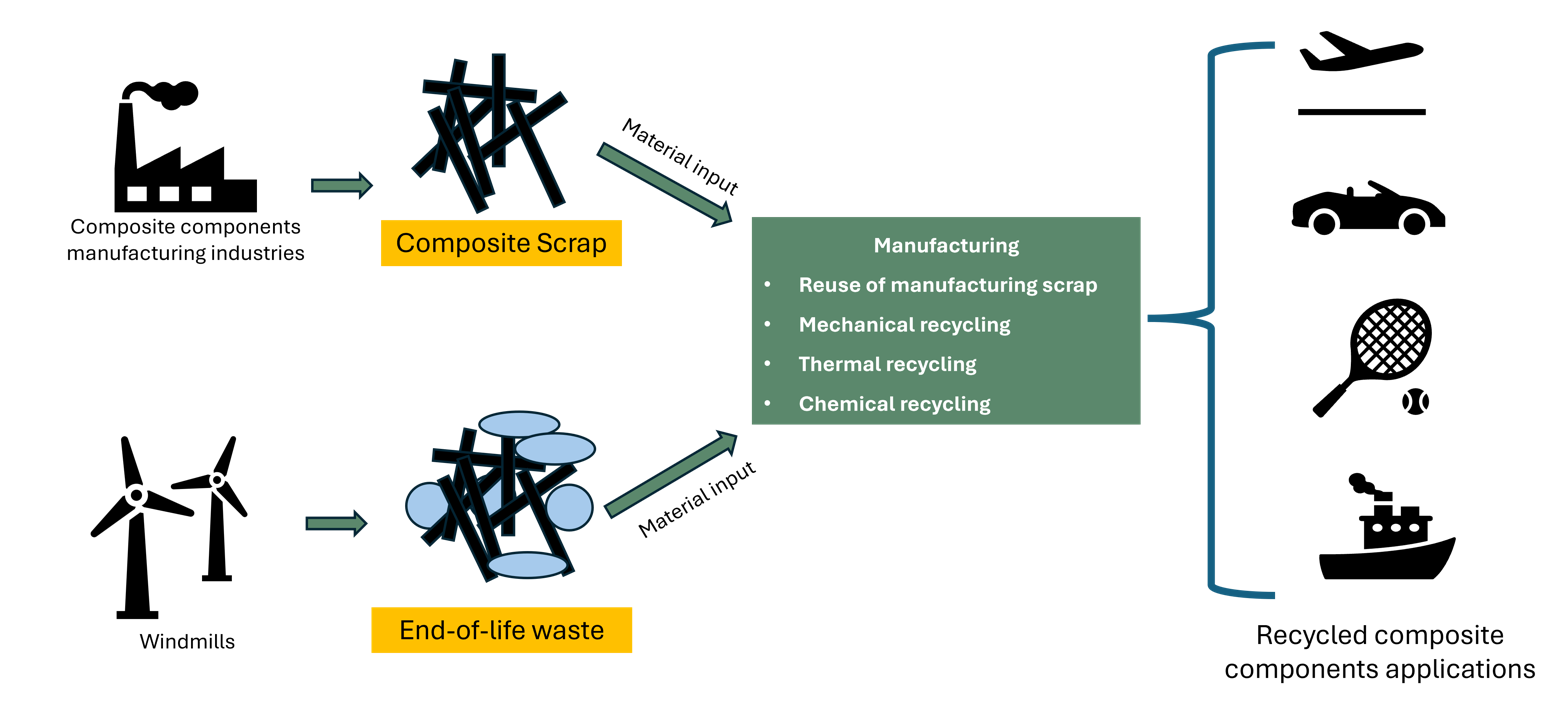
Flow diagram showing the conversion of composite manufacturing scrap and end-of-life composite waste into recycled composite components for engineering applications.

=== Reuse of manufacturing scrap ===
Manufacturing scrap, particularly uncured prepreg offcuts generated during ply cutting and trimming operations, can be reused directly without separating the reinforcing fibres from the polymer matrix. The recovered material is commonly cut into smaller pieces or strands and consolidated using conventional composite manufacturing processes, including compression moulding and vacuum bag curing, to produce new engineering components. This approach retains both the reinforcing fibres and resin system while reducing manufacturing waste and the demand for virgin materials.

=== Mechanical recycling ===
Mechanical recycling reduces composite waste into smaller particles, flakes, or short-fibre materials through cutting, shredding, crushing, or milling operations. The resulting recyclates are subsequently processed into new composite products by methods such as compression moulding or injection moulding. Owing to fibre shortening and changes in fibre orientation during processing, mechanically recycled materials are generally used in non-structural or semi-structural applications.

=== Thermal recycling ===
Thermal recycling employs elevated temperatures to decompose the polymer matrix and recover reinforcing fibres for reuse. The most widely used thermal recycling methods include pyrolysis and fluidised-bed processing, which remove the resin while retaining much of the fibre reinforcement. The recovered fibres may subsequently be incorporated into new composite materials or moulding compounds.

=== Chemical recycling ===
Chemical recycling separates reinforcing fibres from the polymer matrix using solvents or reactive chemicals under controlled processing conditions. Solvolysis is one of the most widely investigated chemical recycling techniques because it enables recovery of fibres with limited degradation of their mechanical properties. The recovered fibres can subsequently be reprocessed into new composite materials for a range of engineering applications.

== Applications ==
Recycled composite components are used in a wide range of industries where lightweight materials, resource efficiency, and sustainability are important. Their applications depend on the type of recovered material, the manufacturing process, and the required mechanical properties.

=== Aerospace ===
In the aerospace industry, recycled composite components are primarily manufactured from production scrap, including uncured prepreg offcuts and trimming waste. These materials are commonly reused to produce secondary structures, tooling, moulds, and other non-critical engineering components, reducing manufacturing waste while retaining much of the original material value.

=== Automotive ===
The automotive industry uses recycled composite components in interior panels, brackets, underbody shields, battery enclosures, and other lightweight structural and semi-structural applications. Increasing demand for lightweight vehicles and circular manufacturing has encouraged the adoption of recycled composite materials in vehicle production.

=== Construction ===
In the construction sector, recycled composite components are used in panels, decking systems, reinforcement elements, and other building products where corrosion resistance, low weight, and durability are advantageous.

=== Marine ===
Marine applications include decking, interior structures, and secondary components. In this field of application, the resistance to moisture and corrosion makes recycled composite materials suitable for long-term service.

=== Other applications ===
Recycled composite components are also used in sporting goods, consumer products, wind energy, and industrial equipment. Ongoing research has expanded their use in both structural and non-structural applications while supporting circular economy initiatives and reducing dependence on virgin composite materials.

== Properties and performance ==
The mechanical properties and performance of recycled composite components depend on the source of the recycled material, the recovery process, manufacturing method, fibre architecture, and the quality of the fibre–matrix interface. Components manufactured from directly reused production scrap generally retain more of the original material architecture than those produced from recycled fibres, resulting in improved mechanical performance.

The recovery process also influences the properties of recycled composite components. Mechanical recycling generally produces shorter and randomly oriented fibres, which may reduce the strength and stiffness of the final component. Thermal and chemical recycling methods can recover fibres with a greater retention of their original mechanical properties, although fibre length, surface condition, and residual matrix may affect the performance of remanufactured composites.

The intended application of recycled composite components is largely determined by their mechanical performance and manufacturing route. Components produced from reclaimed manufacturing scrap are commonly used in semi-structural and non-structural applications, whereas recovered fibres with controlled alignment and processing have also been investigated for structural applications.

Continued improvements in recycling technologies, fibre realignment methods, and manufacturing processes have enhanced the quality and consistency of recycled composite components, expanding their potential use in engineering applications.

== Environmental impact ==
The manufacture of recycled composite components can reduce the environmental impacts associated with composite production by extending the service life of composite materials and reducing the demand for virgin raw materials. Reusing manufacturing waste and end-of-life composite materials also reduces the quantity of waste sent to landfill or incineration while supporting resource efficiency and circular economy principles.

Life cycle assessment studies have shown that manufacturing components from reclaimed composite materials generally requires less energy and produces lower greenhouse gas emissions than manufacturing equivalent components from virgin composite materials. The environmental benefits depend on factors such as the recycling method, transportation, recovered material quality, and the intended application of the recycled component.

Although recycled composite components can reduce environmental impacts, their overall sustainability depends on efficient collection, sorting, processing, and manufacturing systems. Continued improvements in recycling technologies and manufacturing processes are expected to further enhance the environmental performance of recycled composite components and support more sustainable use of composite materials.

== Challenges and limitations ==
Despite the growing use of recycled composite components, several technical and economic challenges remain. The properties of recycled components can vary depending on the quality of the recovered material, the recycling method, and the manufacturing process, making consistent quality control more difficult than for components manufactured from virgin materials.

Mechanical recycling often shortens reinforcing fibres and produces randomly oriented fibre architectures, which may reduce the strength and stiffness of the resulting components. Thermal and chemical recycling methods can recover higher-quality fibres, but they generally require specialised equipment, greater energy input, or the use of chemical reagents, which may increase processing costs.

The heterogeneous composition of composite waste, together with the presence of different fibre types, polymer matrices, and additives, also complicates material recovery and remanufacturing. In addition, the limited availability of standardised recycling processes and quality assessment methods has constrained the wider adoption of recycled composite components in high-performance structural applications.

Ongoing research is focused on improving recycling technologies, manufacturing methods, and material characterisation to enhance the quality, consistency, and commercial viability of recycled composite components.

== Standards and regulations ==
The development and use of recycled composite components are influenced by environmental regulations, waste-management policies, and industry initiatives that promote resource efficiency and sustainable manufacturing. Within the European Union, the Waste Framework Directive (Directive 2008/98/EC) establishes the waste hierarchy as the guiding principle for waste management, prioritising waste prevention, reuse, recycling, recovery, and disposal. The directive has encouraged the development of recycling technologies and manufacturing processes capable of recovering valuable constituents from composite waste while reducing the environmental impacts associated with landfill disposal and incineration.

In the automotive sector, the End-of-Life Vehicles Directive (Directive 2000/53/EC) requires high levels of material reuse, recycling, and recovery, encouraging manufacturers to improve end-of-life management strategies and increase the use of recyclable materials in vehicle production.

Although no international standard is dedicated specifically to recycled composite components, their manufacture and testing generally follow existing composite material standards and application-specific engineering requirements. Ongoing research and industrial initiatives continue to support the development of standardised recycling processes, quality assessment methods, and certification procedures to facilitate the wider adoption of recycled composite components in engineering applications.

== See also ==
- Carbon fibre
- Composite material
- Circular economy
- Fibre-reinforced composites
- Fibre-reinforced composite recycling
- Glass fibre
- Life cycle assessment
- Waste hierarchy
