= The End of All Things =

The End of All Things may refer to:

- The End of All Things (Fringe), an episode of the American television series Fringe
- The End of All Things (novel), a science fiction novel by John Scalzi
- The End of All Things (Invincible), a two-part graphic novel by Robert Kirkman
- The End of All Things, a song by Panic! at the Disco from Too Weird to Live, Too Rare to Die!

== See also ==
- The End of Everything
