= Sports engineering =

Sports equipment design

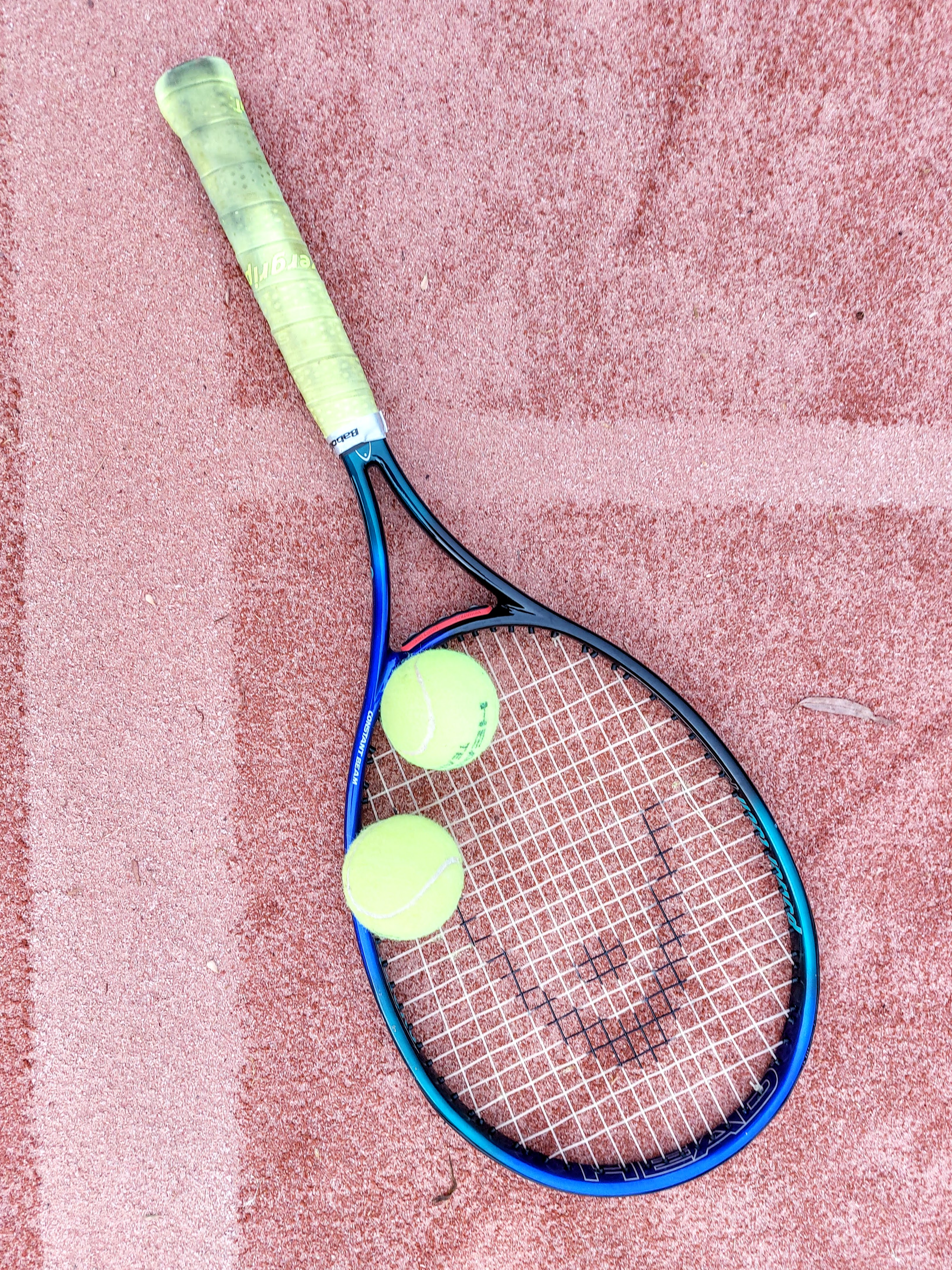
Head Tennis Racket

Sports engineering is a sub-discipline of engineering that applies mathematics and science to develop technology, equipment, and other resources for sport. The terms sports engineering and sports technology are sometimes used interchangeably, although sports technology is often understood as the more general concept. This interdisciplinary approach further integrates knowledge from engineering, biomechanics, and physics to improve athletic performance, safety, and the scientific understanding of human movement. Engineers of this field create and analyse a wide range of products and systems, such as sporting goods, protective gear, clothing, footwear, and wearable sensors. It also covers sporting facilities, officiating and regulatory technologies, performance monitoring and training tools. Together, these technologies form an ecosystem that supports athlete participation, competition, performance, and safety.

Sports engineering was first introduced by Isaac Newton’s observation of a tennis ball. In the mid-twentieth century, Howard Head became one of the first inventors to apply engineering principles to improve sports equipment. Dedicated to showing the innovations in this field, the International conference for sports engineering and the journal Sports Engineering were introduced.

This discipline requires an understanding of a variety of engineering topics, including physics, mechanical engineering, biomechanics, materials science, and computational engineering. Many practitioners hold degrees in those topics rather than in sports engineering specifically. Specific study programs in sports engineering and technology are becoming more common at the undergraduate and graduate level in the USA, central Europe and the Asia-Pacific area.

In terms of materials, the discipline replicates the broad variety of products and facilities. From "pure" metals and polymers to composites and natural materials, a wide range can be found. Sports engineers are therefore trained to adapt to the distinctive requirements in the particular field. This allows not only to incorporate suitable technology in different applications, but also to improve the material selection and processes to optimize the athlete-equipment interaction, safety, and performance.

== History ==
One of the earliest instances of the use of scientific principles in sports context occurred in 1671 when English mathematician Isaac Newton wrote a letter to German theologian and natural philosopher Henry Oldenburg regarding a tennis ball’s flight mechanics. In the following centuries, German scientist Heinrich Gustav Magnus further examined Newton’s analysis and applied Newtonian theories to the spinning properties of balls. Around 1760, in the midst of the Industrial Revolution, sports engineering was further explored with the acceleration of the manufacturing of sports equipment. During this stage, the manufacturers recognized an increase in sales being directly related to better quality of equipment. As a result, experimentation started to explore new designs and materials for greater athletic performance.

In modern times, sports engineers, such as Howard Head, applied engineering principles to sports equipment. After finding traditional snow skis to be too heavy, Head developed lighter, more flexible skis in 1947. He used his knowledge from the aircraft industry to create skis with a metal-sandwich construction. After 40 iterations and 3 years, he released his skis commercially, and they soon set the standard for skis. Today, his skis are widely known and recognized under the brand Head, with Head Sportswear International, and the Head Ski Company. Head also developed the Prince Classic tennis racquet. He created a much lighter design, with a bigger frame supporting off-center hits, and a grip that did not twist in players' hands. As with his skis, Head's oversized racquets were embraced by top athletes in the sport.

In 1998, the International Sports Engineering Association (ISEA) was established and the journal Sports Engineering was published. In 1999, the first international sports engineering conference was organized by Steve Haake called The International Conference on the Engineering of Sports in Sheffield, England. The conference brings world-leading researchers, sports professionals, and industry organizations together to celebrate the profession, showcasing innovations in both research and industry.

Sports engineering has become an important sub-discipline in modern engineering. The optimization of athlete-equipment interaction and the importance of technology for safety and performance, and therefore success has become more frequent ever since. The Speedo LZR Racer, as a prominent example, is a swimsuit developed in collaboration with NASA researchers and engineers and launched 2015. Sports engineers tested different materials and coatings in a wind tunnel to reduce drag and optimized stability and mobility by using layering and joining techniques specific to particular body parts. The LZR Racer was able to reduce skin friction drag by 24% compared to Speedo’s previous suit, resulting in several new world records. Inventions like this present sports engineering as a field of potential and have popularized it as a discipline of very tangible developments.

== Discipline ==
=== Associated fields ===
Sports engineering synthesizes content from both engineering and sports science. Consequently, programs in sports engineering encompass on one hand engineering-oriented classes such as physics, engineering mechanics, aerodynamics, and materials engineering, and on the other hand sports science-based courses such as physiology, anatomy or training theory. In between, there are some interdisciplinary courses like biomechanics or smart devices in sports, which cannot strictly be classified as one or the other.

==== Biomechanics ====
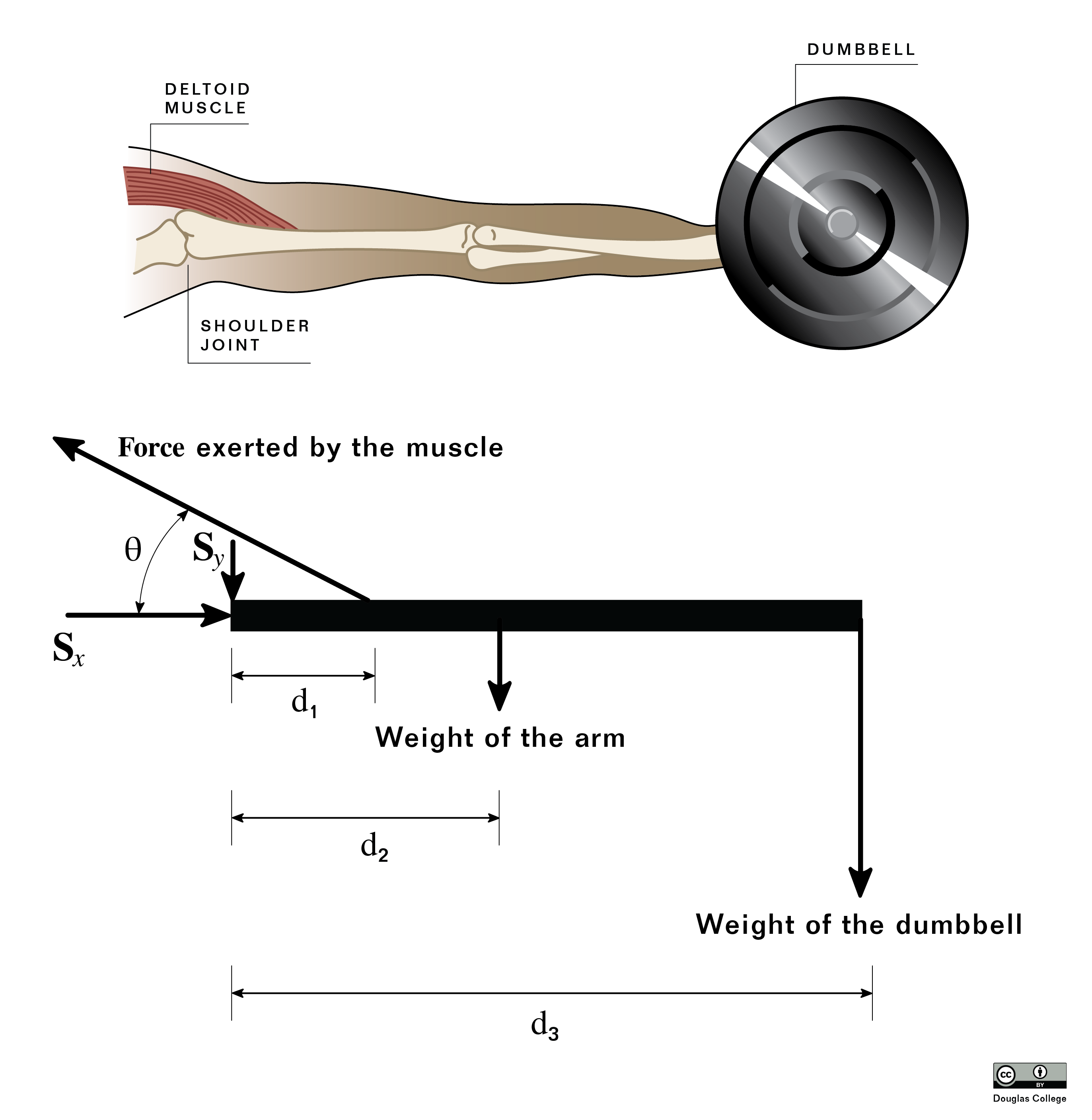
Example of Biomechanical Consideration

Biomechanics is the scientific discipline that examines the mechanical principles governing living organisms. The focus lies on the forces acting on the human body and their effects on movement and biological function. Drawing on concepts from mechanics, including kinematics and kinetics, biomechanics attempts to understand how internal and external forces influence motion. To achieve this, the field uses a variety of measurement techniques, such as motion capture, and analytical methods, like inverse dynamics. This helps the engineers to quantify movement, evaluate body alignment, and investigate interactions between the athlete, their equipment and their environment. Biomechanics is associated with numerous disciplines, like medicine, engineering, and sports science, which makes it therefore also particularly relevant within sports engineering. Biomechanical principles provide the basis and support the design and optimization of sports technologies with the aim of improving performance, safety, and injury prevention.

==== Materials science ====
Materials and material selection for sporting goods involve diligent consideration of the regulations and requirements once a product or facility is in use. Materials are one of the determining factors of performance, and therefore of popularity, success and money. Therefore, the materials and their selection must maintain a balance between optimization of properties and structures and cost effectiveness. Based on materials, revolutionary results were achieved in professional sports and there is still room for improvement in certain fields, such as paralympic sports.

According to the curricula of the universities, courses in this field resemble other engineering programs in terms of structure. The focus, however, lays on the specific requirements for the product examined in the course.

==== Computational modeling ====
Computational modeling is commonly employed across many engineering disciplines. It enables engineers to create, simulate and examine the behavior of an object without having to physically produce it or the condition it is operating in. This makes it particularly useful for the application in sports.

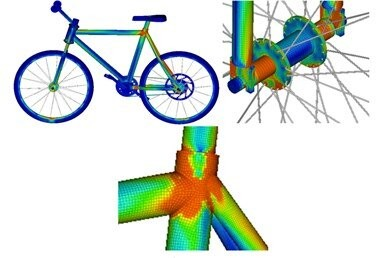
FEM of a Bicycle Frame

Computational fluid dynamics (CFD) can be used in sports engineering education to model flow in both air and water systems. CFD can be applied to sports such as cycling to examine the aerodynamics of cycles and riders' body positions. This information is useful in understanding how to increase cycling speeds and decrease exertion for riders. Furthermore, it enables engineers, for example, to predict fluid patterns around a skier jumping through the air or a swimmer moving through the water, to reduce the drag acting on the athlete.

Computer-aided design (CAD) and finite element modelling (FEM) or analysis (FEA) allows to design and test sports equipment. FEM is an engineering modeling tool that simulates the physics of applied forces acting in a system. Thus, engineers use FEA to apply different stresses to an object and determine its strengths and weaknesses. For example, FEA analysis can be used to examine the impact of a ball against a tennis racket or the different the deformation resulting from the impact of a football. This contributes not only to the performance of the equipment but also to safety through failure prevention.

=== Academic career ===
==== Dissemination ====
Sports engineering in the United States is often part of universities' undergraduate mechanical engineering programs, rather than as stand-alone bachelor's degree programs. On the graduate level, research labs use an interdisciplinary approach to sports engineering such as in the MIT Sports Lab and the Biosports Lab at UC Davis. Some graduate opportunities like the program offered through Purdue include concentrations in sports engineering within the mechanical engineering or materials engineering department.

Sports engineering in academics is more developed in the United Kingdom with programs at the undergraduate and graduate levels. The Sports Engineering Research Group at Sheffield Hallam University - the 'home' of the sports engineering as a discipline, and Loughborough University offer a 1 year, full-time sports engineering postgraduate program. Nottingham Trent University offers a 3 year, full-time undergraduate program that is based on industry-oriented seminars and activities as well as on-campus research experiences like the Sports Engineering lab. Furthermore, this field of studies is offered in various places in central Europe, for example the Universities of Vienna (A), Bayreuth and Magdeburg (DE), as well as Universities in the Netherlands, Sweden and Denmark. Beyond that, it is offered in some places in Japan, Australia, New Zealand and Canada. There is no uniform educational path for becoming a sports engineer: even though the isolated field of sports engineering is offered at the aforementioned universities, most sports engineering students pursue bachelor’s degrees in other areas within engineering. This can include mechanical, electrical, and materials engineering.

==== List of study programs ====
Undergraduate and graduate level programs in sports engineering are more common in Europe as opposed to the United States. The list below highlights offerings currently available in the field of sports engineering.

- Aalborg University (Denmark)
- Centre for Sports Engineering Research (CSER) - Sheffield Hallam University (UK)
- Deutsche Sporthochschule Köln (Germany)
- Griffith University (Australia)
- Islamic Azad University, Science and Research Branch (Iran) (undergraduate & postgraduate students)
- Loughborough University (UK)
- Massachusetts Institute of Technology
- Mittuniversitetet (Sweden)
- Nottingham Trent University
- Purdue University
- TU Chemnitz (Germany) (undergraduate)
- TU Chemnitz (Germany) (graduate)
- TU Delft (Netherlands)
- University of Adelaide (Australia)
- University of Applied Sciences Technikum Wien (Austria, undergraduate)
- University of Applied Sciences Technikum Wien (Austria, graduate)
- University of California Davis
- University of Debrecen, Faculty of Engineering (Hungary)
- University of Otago (New Zealand)

== Materials and applications ==
A basic aspect of sports engineering is understanding the materials available and their capabilities. Since material selection directly influences the performance, safety, durability, and sustainability of sports equipment, knowledge of material science forms one of the most important foundations of sports engineering. The typical classification of materials in engineering consists of metals, polymers, and ceramics. This can be extended by including composites as the mixture of more than one material.

Ashby Chart of Material Groups

These four groups can be divided into subgroups using the Ashby chart, which sorts the groups according to stiffness and density. Compared to the previous classification, it adds some highly relevant groups for the field of sports engineering, such as wood as a biomaterial and a popular ingredient for a composite material. Determining their value for sports engineering, the key properties of the materials are:

- Strength
- Density
- Ductility
- Fatigue resistance
- Toughness
- Modulus (damping)
- Cost

To understand the relevance for design, it is vital to consider first the most important requirements of the final product. The variety of sports, including equipment, fields, courts, conditions and so on forces engineers to use a very broad spectrum of the materials shown in the chart from left to right. As a result, the final and optimized products usually consist of a mix of materials.

=== Metals ===
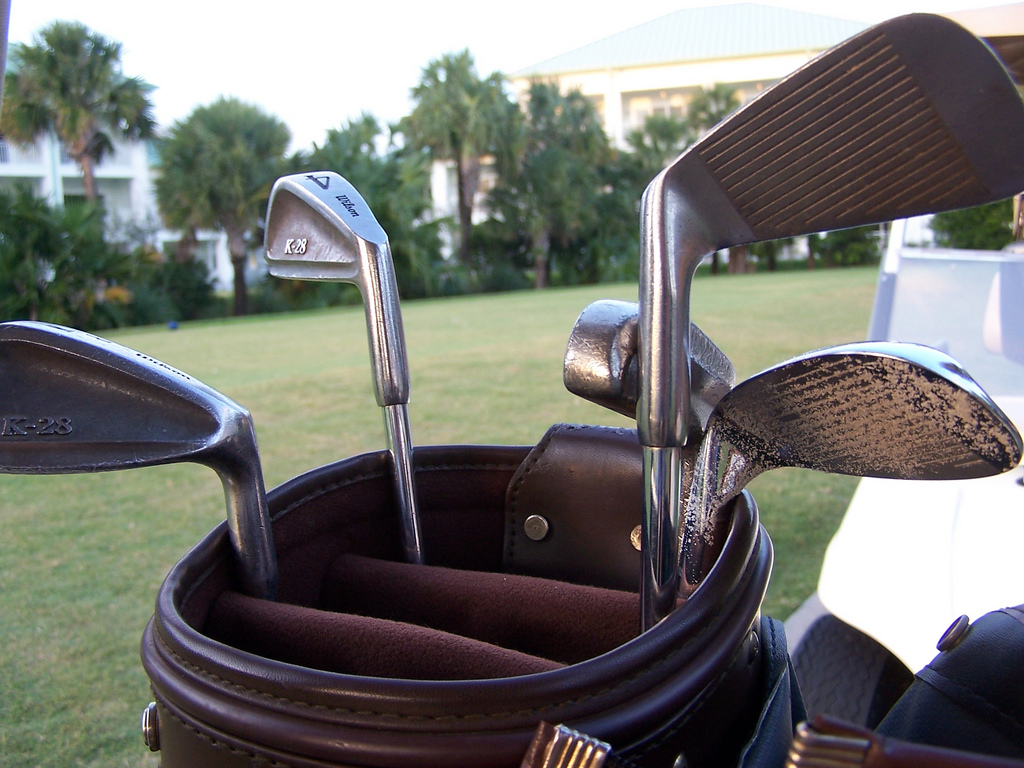
Golf clubs

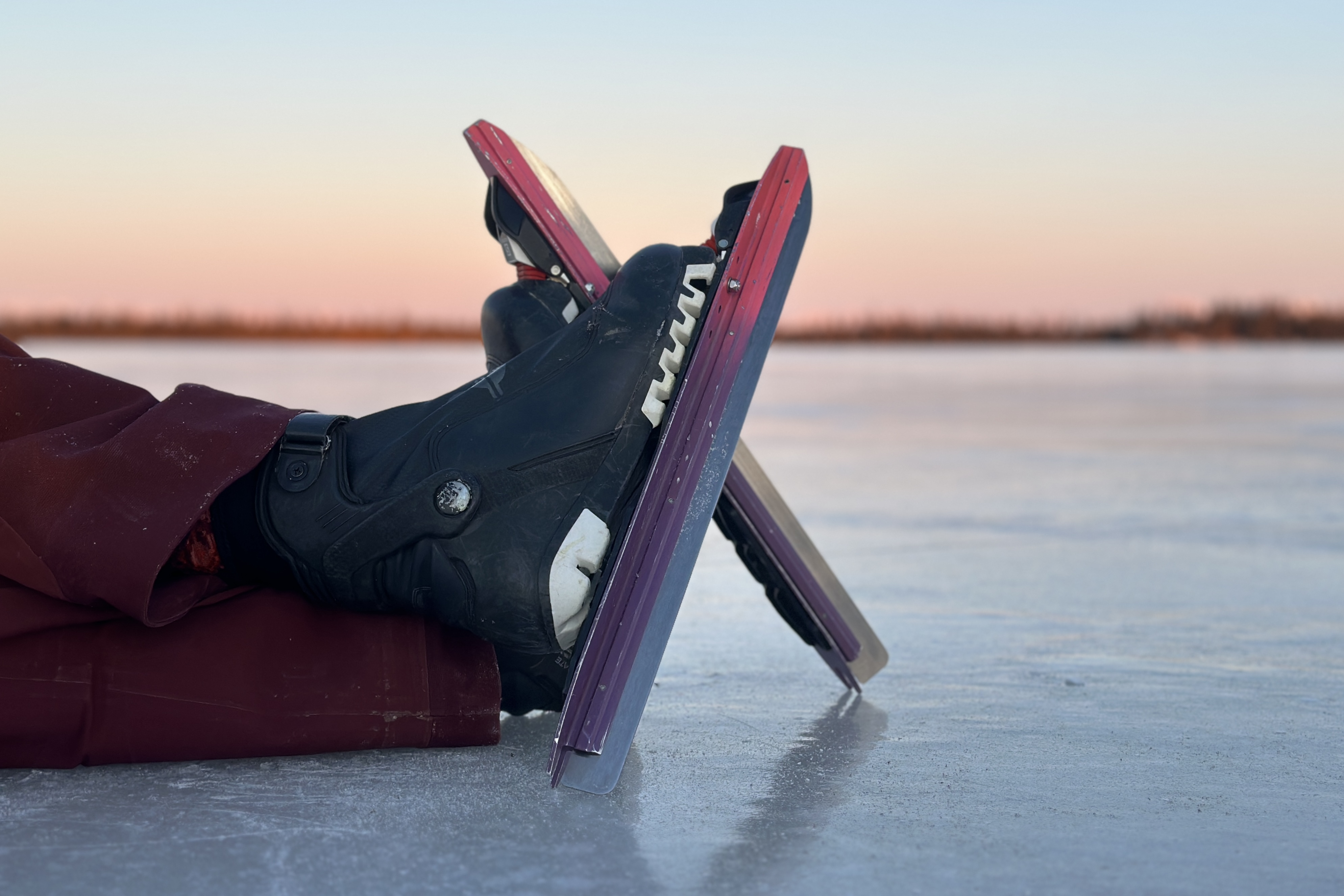
Ice Skates

From the group of metals, steel, aluminum, magnesium and titanium are the most commonly used types in sports. They offer the main advantages of high strength, corrosion resistance and formability. Steel, for example, can be found in:

- Golf clubs
- Bike frames
- Horseback riding (horseshoes, ...)
- Winter sports (edges for skis and snowboards, blades, bobsleighs, ...)
- Mountain sports (various climbing and mountaineering gear)
- Water sports (diving gear, pieces of sailing and rowing boats, ...)
- Fencing equipment (additional benefit: conductivity)

Besides that, steel appears in non-personal equipment, which includes weight lifting machines and equipment like lifting bars or weights in fitness centers and set-ups for gymnastics, like the high bar. This also applies to facilities like outdoor fitness stations, stadiums, etc.

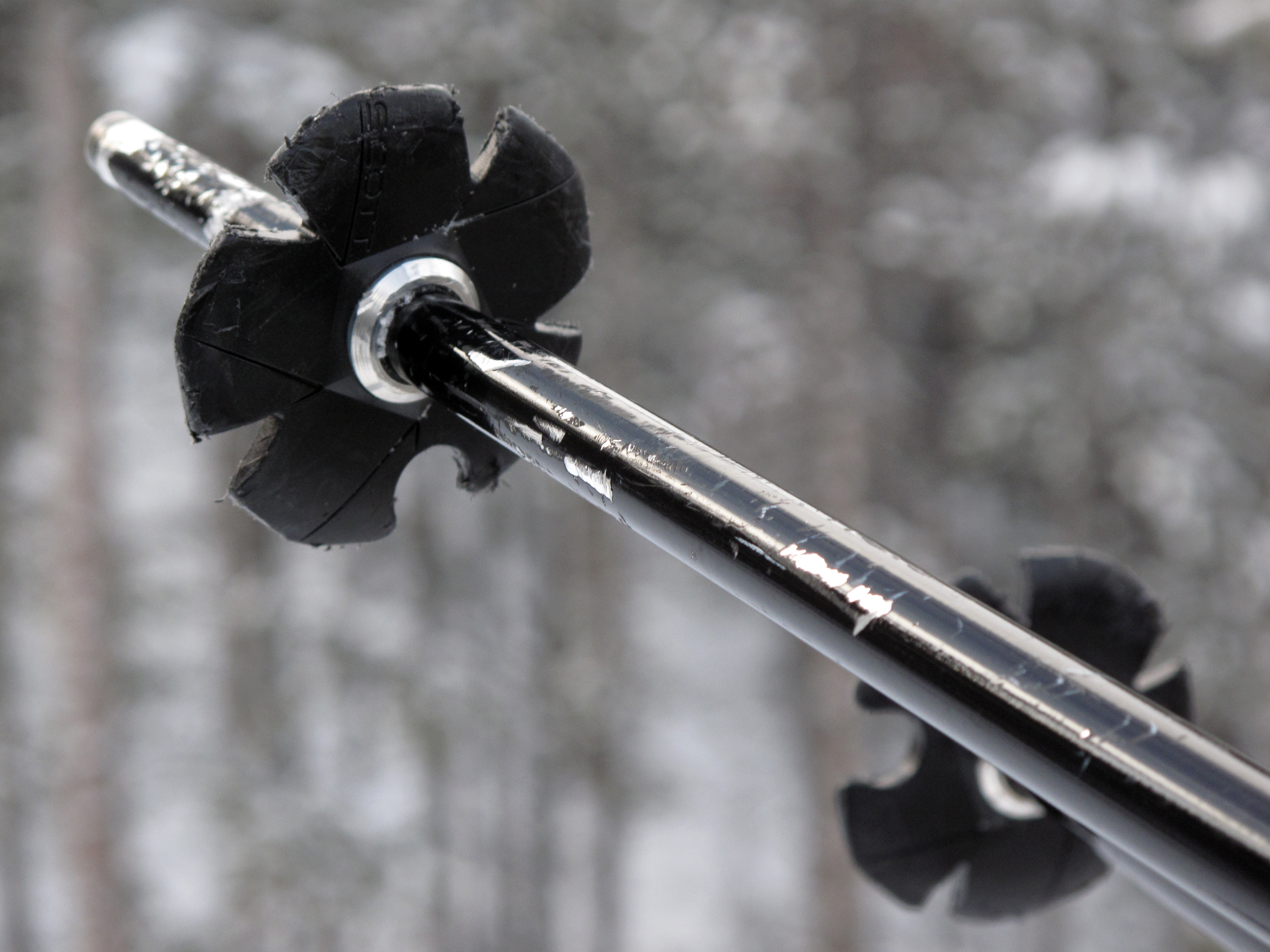
Ski Poles

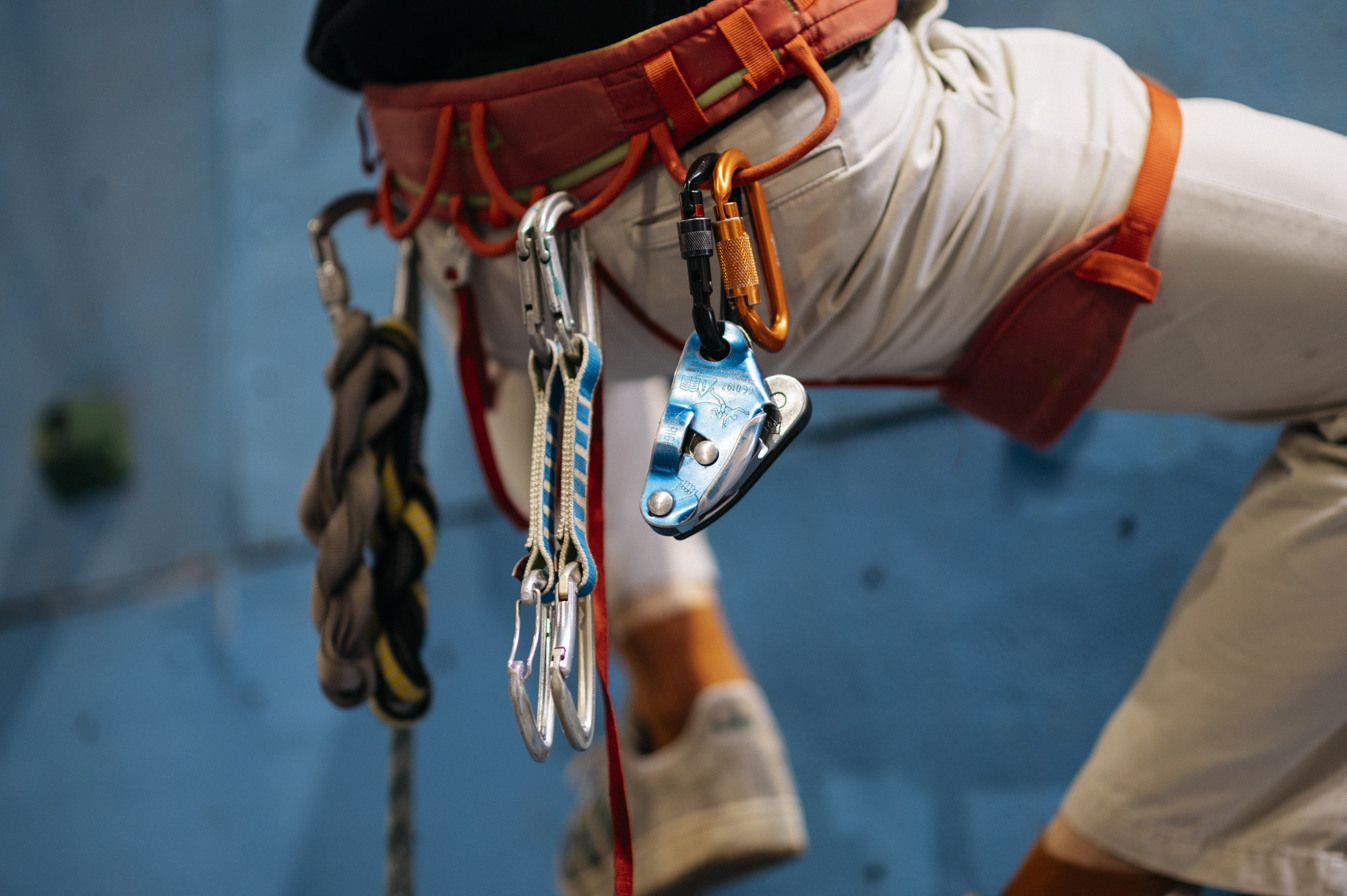
Climbing Gear

In cases where durability is required but objects are required to be lightweight, aluminum, magnesium, or titanium (or alloys with those elements) are used. The latter, however, mostly appears in high-performance sports due to the price of the material. These types of metals can be found in:

- Baseball bats
- Golf clubs
- Tennis rackets (earlier)
- Badminton rackets
- Bike frames
- Track and field (javelins, hurdles, ...)
- Winter sports (skis, snowboards, poles, ...)
- Mountain sports (climbing, ..)

Similar to steel, these materials also appear in non-personal equipment, like in gymnastics (beam) and team sports (goal frames, basketball hoops, ...), as well as in facilities.

=== Polymers ===
Polymeric materials are omnipresent in sports engineering. Their utilization is variable and their purpose reaches from safety over performance to comfort. Over the past decades, the polymer market experienced massive growth, which modernized the sporting good industry. The diversity inside of this material group allowed to incorporate more lightweight, elastic, resistant or damping materials in a likewise wide product range.

Polymer	Application Examples	Key Property	Sources
PE	Synthetic turf fields, sailing equipment, kayak hulls, ski/snowboard bases	Low friction, UV-resistance, hydrophobic	
PP	Stadium seats, artificial turf, helmets	High flexural stiffness, non-water-absorbent	
PU	Running tracks, indoor courts, helmets/protectors (shin), ski/surfboard cores, shoes	Energy return, long-term elasticity, high abrasion resistance	
PVC	Indoor flooring, judo mats, racing boat cores	Slip resistance, wear resistance, flame retardant	
ABS	Casings (treadmills, steppers, electronics), helmets	Shatter-proof impact strength, scratch-resistant surface	
PA (Nylon)	Sportswear, textiles (e.g. sails), flooring, goal nets, tennis/badminton racket strings, snowboard boots	Massive tensile strength, low friction, elastic recovery	
PC	Helmet visors, basketball backboards, goggles (e.g. ski, swimming, cycling)	Optical clarity, "unbreakable"	
EVA (foam)	Cushioning/protective equipment (hockey pads, mats), shoes	Lightweight, closed cell micro-shock absorption	
Elastomers, e.g. rubber	Resistance bands, flooring, tennis balls, table tennis bats, skis, bike tires, shoes, grips	Tear strength, massive elasticity, natural grip	

The use of thermosetting polymers in sports engineering is comparatively limited when unreinforced. Instead, they are predominantly employed as matrix materials in fiber-reinforced composites, where they provide structural support and transfer loads between the reinforcing fibers.

=== Ceramics ===
Ceramic materials are a comparatively minor material group in sports engineering in terms of volume and variability, but they have a significant role in selected applications. This limited use is mainly due to their mechanical behavior: ceramics are typically stiff and wear-resistant, but also brittle and prone to fracture under impact loading. However, modern developments in ceramic engineering have improved fracture resistance, enabling broader industrial and sports-related applications.

One of the most established application areas is motor engineering and motorsport, where high-performance ceramics are used in highly stressed components including engine parts, braking systems, and exhaust-related systems. These materials are especially valued for their high stiffness and thermal stability in comparison to conventional metallic materials. In addition, ceramics are relevant in sensor systems and smart equipment. Ceramic-based components are used in sensors that detect mechanical stress, movement, or impact. They can be integrated into wearable technologies for performance monitoring and biomechanical analysis. These examinations include for example piezoelectric behavior in specific materials, which allows conversion of mechanical signals into electrical output. Finally, ceramic materials are used in sports facilities and infrastructure applications, particularly in which durability, thermal stability, or electrical functionality are required, such as in lighting systems or selected high-performance technical components.

Overall, ceramics do not represent a dominant material class in sports engineering, but they provide essential functions in high-performance mechanical systems, sensing technologies, and specialized safety or infrastructure applications.

=== Composite materials ===
Composites are generally multi-material combinations. They consist of two or more distinct constituent materials that remain separate on the macroscopic scale. Typically, a composite comprises a continuous matrix (polymer, metal, or ceramic) and a reinforcement in the form of fibers, particles, or sheets. By combining the properties of the individual constituents, composites can achieve mechanical and functional characteristics that are not attainable with a single material alone, such as high strength-to-weight ratios, increased stiffness, improved toughness, or enhanced fatigue resistance. Owing to these advantages, composite materials are necessary in modern sports engineering, where lightweight construction and high mechanical performance are essential. In the context of sports, the most important material combinations are carbon or glass fibers in thermoset matrices (CFRP or GFRP).

Equipment	Composite type	Key property	Sources
Tennis rackets	CFRP/GFRP	Shock absorption, force transfer, design freedom	
Golf clubs	CFRP	Lightweight, high strength/elasticity	
Bicycle frames & wheels	CFRP/GFRP	High strength-to-weight ratio, lightweight, aerodynamic optimization	
Skis & ski poles	CFRP/GFRP	Rigidity, abrasion resistance, improved performance lifetime, lightweight	
Vaulting poles	CFRP/GFRP	Energy storage and return, lightweight	
Hockey sticks	CFRP/GFRP	Durability, enhanced energy transfer	
Fishing rods	CFRP/GFRP	High rigidity, fast recovery, lightweight	
Rowing shells, oars & kayaks	CFRP/GFRP	High strength-to-weight ratio, low skin friction	
Archery equipment	CFRP/GFRP	High stiffness, durability, temperature stability	
Baseball & softball bats	CFRP/GFRP	Vibration damping, enlarged sweet spot, crack resistance	
Badminton rackets	CFRP/GFRP	Lightweight, high rigidity, crack resistance	
Surf & windsurfing boards	CFRP/GFRP	Strength-to-weight ratio, suitability for slab structures	
Helmets	CFRP/GFRP	Impact energy absorption, high-strength flake structure	

The table presents selected examples of sports equipment that utilize fiber-reinforced polymers (FRPs), focusing on widely used applications in popular sports. FRPs are also employed in numerous specialized products, including snowmobile components, kites, trampolines, and so on. The range of applications in the sports and recreation industry persists to expand with advances in materials and manufacturing technologies.

=== Natural materials ===
Natural materials are highly significant for the performance and design of sports equipment. While in some sectors they are supported by carbon or glass fiber composites, as seen in the construction of modern skis, or have been completely replaced, as in the case of the pole vault, they continue to be indispensable in several disciplines due to their uniqueness and sensitivity. For instance, wood and its derived products are currently the material of choice for baseball bats, basketball courts, cycling tracks, table tennis rackets, and skateboards, as well as for horse riding obstacles and gymnastics apparatuses. Furthermore, leather continues to be essential due to its capacity to adapt to the particular requirements of products such as baseballs, cricket balls, gloves, footballs, and basketballs. Nevertheless, these materials present additional challenges for engineers, mainly because of their non-uniform and highly anisotropic material behavior.

== Manufacturing processes ==
In the context of sports engineering, selecting the appropriate manufacturing process is critical as it dictates the performance, durability, and cost of the final product. While high-performance requirements exist, the methods used are often not unique to sports and are frequently adopted from other sectors such as the aerospace and automotive industries.

For instance, common industrial methods like injection molding and blow molding are used for various components, such as tennis racket parts and protective gear. For high-performance composites, engineers apply resin transfer molding (RTM). The use of pre-impregnated materials is also common to simplify processing and guarantee consistent quality. Other techniques include compression molding for golf ball cores and skis, rotational molding for hollow items like hockey balls, and thermoforming for thermoplastic composites. Furthermore, additive manufacturing (3D printing) is more frequently employed to produce topology-optimized structures that would be difficult to create with traditional tooling.

== Sustainability ==
In contemporary sports engineering, sustainability is now a fundamental priority that is integrated directly into the initial product creation process, largely because approximately 80% of a product's environmental burden is established during the design phase through decisions regarding materials and manufacturing.

A main challenge in this field is the widespread use of high-performance fiber-polymer composites, which, unlike metals, are notoriously difficult and expensive to recycle in a sustainable manner. Conventional thermal recycling methods for these materials often lead to an 80–95% reduction in the mechanical strength of reclaimed fibers, frequently rendering them unsuitable for reuse in high-performance equipment.

Although there are obstacles, there are promising developments in the industry, such as the growing adoption of thermoplastic matrices that can be melted and reformed at the end of their life cycle. Engineers are also utilizing innovative bio-based materials like polylactic acid (PLA) derived from corn and developing biodegradable tennis strings made from corn starch to reduce environmental impacts. Furthermore, circular economy initiatives like the Eco Circle program now allow for the chemical recycling of polyester textiles back into high-quality new fibers without performance loss. These efforts are complemented by the development of advanced functional materials, including auxetic foams for superior impact protection and sustainable textiles like bamboo charcoal yarns, which try to balance peak athletic performance with ecological responsibility.

== See also ==
- Biomechanics
- Composites
- Materials science
- Mechanical engineering
- Sports equipment
- Sports medicine
- Sports science
- Physics
