= End of life =

End of life or end-of-life may refer to:

- Death
- Extinction, the termination of an organism
- End-of-life (product), terminating the sale or support of goods and services
- End of life, a phase during a software release life cycle when software is no longer sold or supported

== See also ==
- End-of-life care, medical care for patients with terminal illnesses
- End-of-life planning (disambiguation)
- End of the world (disambiguation)
- The End of Everything (disambiguation)
- Death of everything (disambiguation)
- Global catastrophe scenarios
