= Swedish death cleaning =

Decluttering method

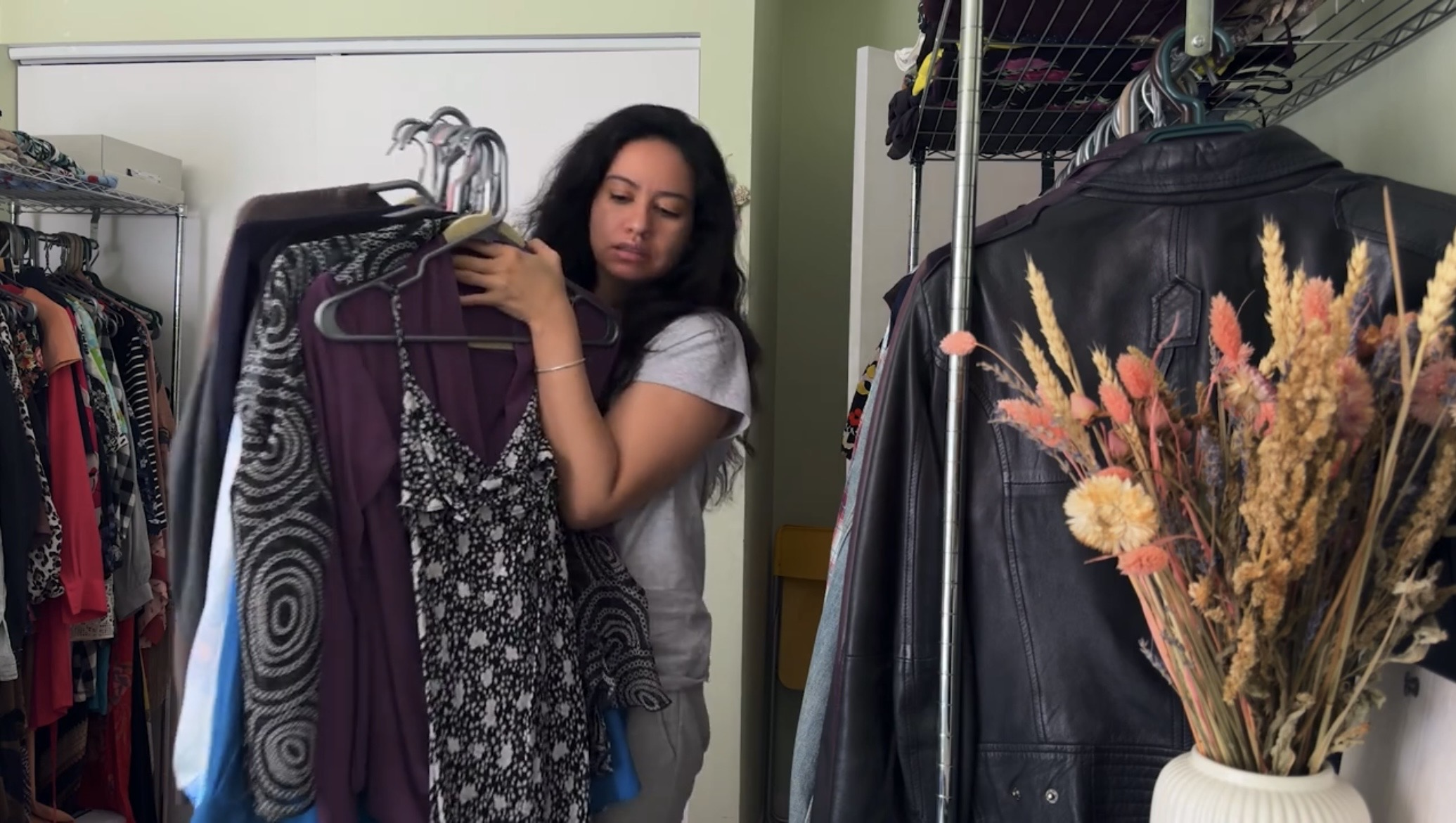
Swedish death cleaning

Swedish death cleaning (Swedish: döstädning) is a decluttering method popularised in Sweden by Margareta Magnusson's 2017 book, The Gentle Art of Swedish Death Cleaning. It is a simple living practice that encourages people to get rid of belongings before death to spare loved ones from having to manage them. The word entered the Swedish Language Council’s list of new words in 2017; while sorting belongings before death isn’t entirely new, historians such as Akesson argue the modern practice reflects a consumer society’s accumulation of possessions, and earlier death preparation focused on relationships and religious rites.

Magnusson, who died 12 March 2026, described this practice of tidying up as something to do "when you think the time is coming closer for you to leave the planet". As the practice has become more popular in the United States, it has been praised as practical and gratifying but also criticized as morbid.

The tradition inspired a 2023 TV show on Peacock, The Gentle Art of Swedish Death Cleaning, produced by Amy Poehler. In the show, three Swedish people help Americans declutter and detach from their belongings.

== See also ==
- Shukatsu (end-of-life planning), Japan
