= EOL =

EOL, eol, or Eol may refer to:

- Encyclopedia of Life, a freely-accessible, online collaborative bio-encyclopedia
- End-of-life (product), a term used with respect to terminating the sale or support of goods and services
- End-of-line, a special character or sequence of characters signifying the end of a line of text in computing
- Eol, poetic form of Aeolus, a character representing the wind in Greek mythology
- The Empress of light, a Terraria boss

== See also ==
- End-of-life care (EoLC), medical care options, primarily for patients who are considered critically ill
- End-of-life (disambiguation)
