= Margareta Magnusson =

Swedish painter and essayist (1934–2026)

- Born: Margareta Elisabeth Bothén; 31 December 1934; Gothenburg, Sweden
- Died: 12 March 2026 (aged 91); Gothenburg, Sweden
- Education: Beckmans College of Design
- Occupations: Painter, author
- Notable work: The Gentle Art of Swedish Death Cleaning

Margareta Elisabeth Bothén (31 December 1934 – 12 March 2026) was a Swedish painter and essayist.

Magnusson was born in Gothenburg, the daughter of gynecologist Nils Bothén and nurse Carin Lindqvist. She studied at the Beckmans College of Design in Stockholm, from where she graduated in 1956. She was best known for popularizing the term Swedish death cleaning, in which those near death would declutter their homes and give away possessions. The practice was done primarily to save loved ones from having to partake in cleaning out items after one's death and the emotional distress of doing so. Her book on the topic was an international bestseller in 2017.

Magnusson died in Gothenburg on 12 March 2026, at the age of 91. Her daughter, Jane, who was one of her five children, confirmed that her mother had left her attic and basement empty.
