= Sports Engineering =

- Discipline: Sports engineering
- Language: English
- Edited by: Tom Allen

Publication details
- History: 1998–present
- Publisher: Springer for International Sports Engineering Association
- Frequency: Quarterly
- Open access: Hybrid

Standard abbreviations
- ISO 4: Sports Eng.

Indexing
- ISSN: 1369-7072 (print); 1460-2687 (web)

Links
- Journal homepage

Sports Engineering is a peer-reviewed academic journal covering "the application of engineering to sport". It is the journal of the International Sports Engineering Association, published for them by Springer. It was founded in 1998 by Steve Haake, then at University of Sheffield. It is published quarterly and is a hybrid open-access journal. The contents and abstracts are available online for volumes 6- (2003-). It is indexed in services including Ei Compendex, Inspec and Scopus.
