= Toyo Keizai =

Japanese book and magazine publisher

Toyo Keizai Inc.
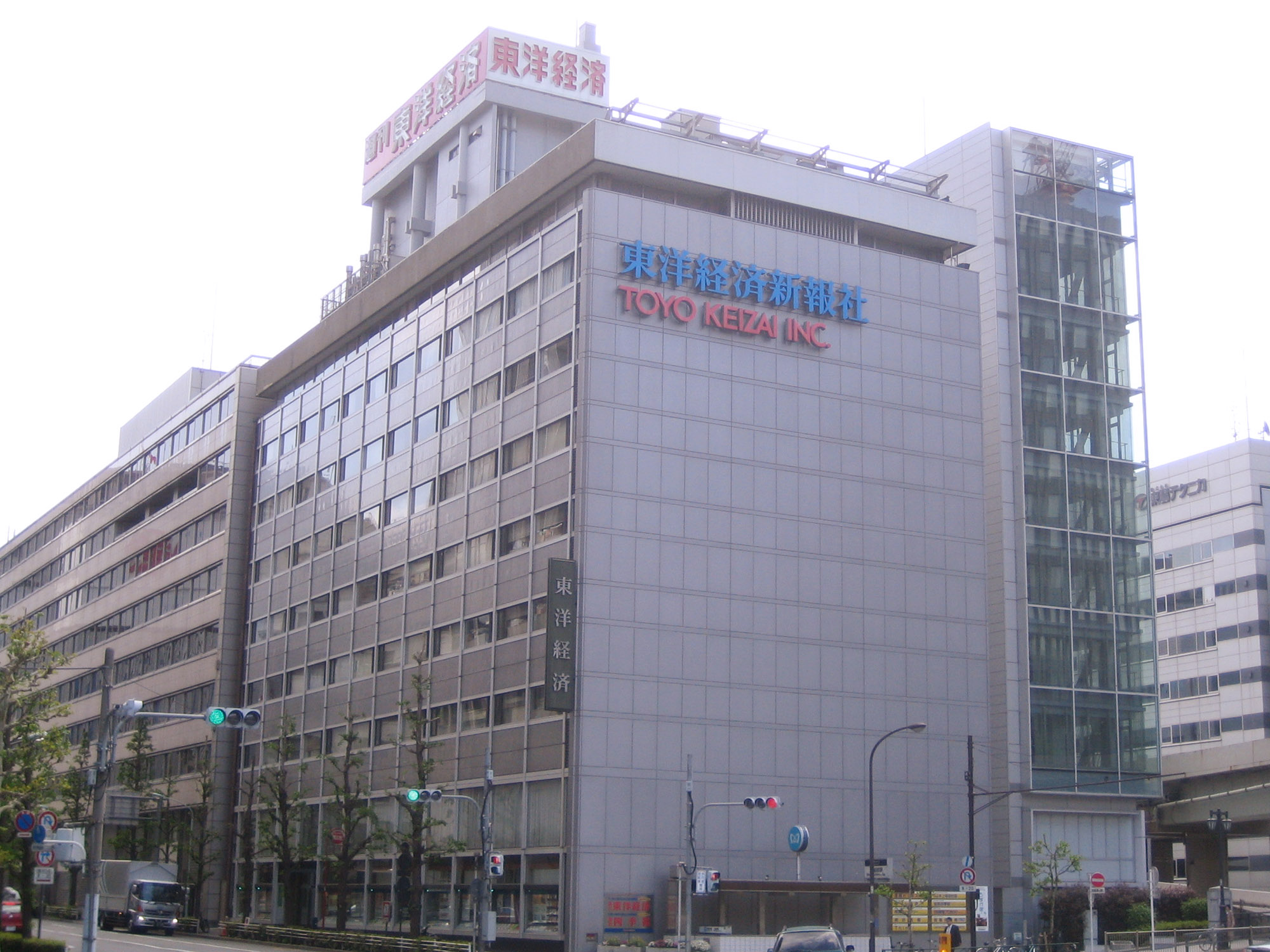
- Headquarters of Toyo Keizai in Tokyo, Japan
- Native name: 東洋経済新報社
- Founded: 1895; 131 years ago
- Founder: Machida Chūji
- Headquarters: Tokyo, Japan
- Brands: Toyo Keizai, Kaisha Shikiho
- Website: corp.toyokeizai.net/en/

Toyo Keizai Inc. (株式会社東洋経済新報社, Kabushiki-gaisha Tōyō Keizai Shinpōsha) is a book and magazine publisher specializing in politics, economics and business, based in Tokyo, Japan.

The company is famous for Weekly Toyo Keizai (週刊東洋経済, Shūkan Tōyō Keizai) established in 1895, one of three Japanese leading business magazines ranked with Nikkei Business (日経ビジネス) published by Nikkei Business Publications and Weekly Diamond (週刊ダイヤモンド) published by Diamond.

== Major magazines, websites and services ==
- Weekly Toyo Keizai, Japan’s oldest business magazine published since 1895.
- Kaisha Shikiho, Japanese company quarterly handbook which provides comprehensive earnings forecasts information for all listed companies in Japan.
- Toyo Keizai Online, one of the largest websites for economics and business in Japan.
- Toyo Keizai Data Services, data provider of economic and corporate data.
