= University of Applied Sciences Technikum Wien =

University of applied sciences

Coordinates: 48°14′22″N 16°22′40″E

- Fachhochschule Technikum Wien (FHTW)
- Type: Public–private partnership
- Established: 1994
- Rector: FH-Prof. Dr. Sylvia Geyer
- Director: Horst Rode, Florian Eckkrammer
- Students: 4,593 regular studies, 294 course studies (Winter semester 2024/25)
- Location: Vienna, Austria
- Colours
- Website: www.technikum-wien.at/en/

University of Applied Sciences Technikum Wien (Also: UAS Technikum Wien, German: Fachhochschule Technikum Wien) is a technical university of applied sciences in Austria. With around 18,000 graduates to date and around 4,700 students on more than 30 Bachelor's and Master's degree courses, it is the largest technical university of applied sciences in Austria.

== History ==
Its predecessor institution was founded in 1994 and was the first institution in Vienna to be granted the status of a university of applied sciences in 2000.

Part-time degree courses were introduced as early as 2001. In 2003, it was the first university of applied sciences in Austria to switch to the Bologna-compliant Bachelor's and Master's system. In 2005, the university founded its own further education institute, the Life-Long Learning Academy, which today operates as the Technikum Wien Academy. In October 2008, UAS Technikum Wien opened a second location in the passive office building ENERGYbase in Floridsdorf (Vienna) and following that, in 2013 a comprehensive expansion of the main location at Höchstädtplatz in Vienna's 20th district Brigittenau was completed.

Since 2012, UAS Technikum Wien has been a member of the European University Association (EUA). In December 2015, UAS Technikum Wien was awarded the Erasmus+ Award 2015 in the category of Higher Education. A milestone in academic development was the introduction of the first cooperative doctoral program with TU Wien in the field of embedded systems in 2018.

This was followed in 2021 by another program in Tissue Engineering. During the COVID-19 pandemic in 2020, UAS Technikum Wien switched to distance learning at short notice and successfully established new digital formats. In April 2021, FH-Prof. Dr. Sylvia Geyer was appointed to succeed FH-Prof. DI Dr. Fritz Schmöllebeck as the rector of UAS Technikum Wien, acting as of September 1, 2021. In 2024, it celebrated its 30th anniversary. To mark the anniversary, four new degree programs were launched in future-oriented fields such as hydrogen technology and quantum technologies.

Since 2025, UAS Technikum Wien has been the first and only university in Austria to bear the Austrian Ecolabel for educational institutions. In 2025, UAS Technikum Wien and the Medical University of Vienna launched a joint cooperative doctoral program with a focus on artificial intelligence in cancer diagnostics. Since December 1, the University of Applied Sciences Technikum Wien has a new commercial director in Horst Rode.

== Faculties ==
UAS Technikum Wien is divided into four faculties. These form the academic foundation of the university and cover central areas of technical and scientific education.

- Computer Science & Applied Mathematics: computer science, AI, software development and applied mathematics
- Electronic Engineering & Entrepreneurship: electronics, innovation and entrepreneurial skills
- Industrial Engineering: production, digitalization and industrial process optimization
- Life Science Engineering: biotechnology, medical engineering and environmental technologies

== Degree programmes ==
UAS Technikum Wien offers practical Bachelor's and Master's degree programs with a technical focus. The courses are geared towards the requirements of business, industry and research.

=== Master's programmes ===
- Business Information Systems (part-time)
- Data science (part-time)
- Ecotoxicology & Environmental management (part-time)
- Embedded systems (part-time)
- Game Engineering and Simulation (full-time)
- Health and Rehabilitation Technology (full-time)
- Information systems Management (distance learning)
- Information systems Management – Double Degree Programme (part-time)
- Innovation and Technology management (part-time)
- Integrative Urban Development – Smart City (part-time)
- International Industrial engineering (part-time)
- IT security (part-time)
- Mechanical Engineering – Digitalised Product Development & Simulation (full-time)
- Mechatronics and Robotics (full-time, part-time)
- Medical engineering & eHealth (full-time)
- Power electronics (Part-time)
- Urban Renewable energy Systems (part-time)
- Software Engineering (part-time)
- Sports Technology (full-time)
- Telecommunications and Internet Technologies (part-time)
- Tissue engineering and Regenerative medicine (part-time)

=== Bachelor's programmes ===
- Biomedical engineering (full-time)
- Business informatics (full-time, part-time)
- Computer science (full-time, dual)
- Electronics (full-time)
- Electronics and Business (part-time)
- Human Factors and Sports engineering (full-time)
- Information and Communication Systems (part-time)
- International Industrial engineering (part-time)
- Mechatronics and Robotics (full-time)
- Mechanical Engineering (full-time)
- Smart homes and Assistive Technologies (full-time)
- Urban Renewable energy Technologies (full-time)

== Research and development ==
The following thematic focal points form the strategic framework and focus for research at the UAS Technikum Wien:

- Automation and Robotics: Projects in the fields of Industry 4.0, 3D printing and bioplastics.
- Embedded systems and Cyber-physical systems: The focus areas are primarily related to platforms and development tools for intelligent products as well as the application domains of smart homes and assistive technologies.
- Renewable Urban Energy Systems: The focus is on urban technologies and on the cities of the future as well as on questions regarding mobility.
- Data-driven, Secure and Smart systems: Focus on the exchange, interoperability, use of health data, but not only in ambient assisted living.
- Tissue engineering and Molecular Life Science Technologies: The applications range from the regeneration of joints in the body all the way to various types of material coatings for industrial applications.
- eHealth & Mobility: Digital health applications and intelligent transport systems
- Bioengineering & Molecular Life Science Technologies: Tissue engineering, bioanalytics and molecular biotechnology.

In addition, staff at UAS Technikum Wien conduct research on other technologies and work on projects in subject areas such as telecommunications, security and usability.

== Cooperation ==
UAS Technikum Wien cooperates with companies, start-ups, research institutions and educational partners. The aim is to strengthen the link between theory and practice, promote innovation and offer students practical perspectives.

With the Entrepreneurship in Technology program, the university supports start-ups through coaching, mentoring and network access. Companies can get in touch with students via job platforms, career events and dual study models.

In applied research, the UAS Technikum Wien works together with industry within the framework of EU projects, innovation checks and the Josef Ressel Center. Events such as the Manufacturing Day and projects with partners such as the Austrian Research Promotion Agency (FFG) underline the transfer into practice.

== International ==
UAS Technikum Wien is internationally networked and cooperates with over 100 universities worldwide. The aim is to promote international mobility, expand research cooperation and strengthen intercultural skills in education.

Within the framework of programs such as Erasmus+, there are partnerships with renowned universities, including the Riga Technical University, the Politecnico di Milano, the University of Porto and Tampere University.

== Awards and certificates ==
- 2025: 1st place in the “Image” category in the Austrian Industry Magazine university of applied sciences ranking
- 2025: Austrian Ecolabel for educational institutions

== Rankings ==
UAS Technikum Wien is listed in several national and international university rankings.

In the international EduRank (2025), UAS Technikum Wien achieved 29th place among Austrian universities and 3,996th place worldwide. In the AD Scientific Index (2025), it is ranked 37th in Austria, 1,877th in Europe and 7,732nd worldwide in terms of research performance and scientific visibility. According to uniRank (2025), the university is ranked 23rd among Austrian institutions. In the trend Employer Ranking (2022), UAS Technikum Wien achieved 22nd place in Austria and 3rd place in the Education & Research sector.
