= End-of-life planning =

End-of-life planning may refer to:

- Estate planning
- Planning for end-of-life care
- End-of-life product planning
- Shukatsu (end-of-life planning), Japanese practice of planning for one's own end of life
