= Steve Haake =

British sports engineer

Steve Haake OBE
- Born: Stephen John Haake
- Education: University of Leeds (BSc); Aston University (PhD)
- Scientific career
- Workplaces: University of Sheffield; Sheffield Hallam University; National Centre for Sport and Exercise Medicine; Parkrun
- Thesis: Apparatus and test methods for measuring the impact of golf balls on turf and their application in the field (1989)
- Doctoral advisor: Alastair Cochran
- Website: stevehaake.com

Stephen John Haake OBE (/heɪk/ HAYK) is a British sports engineer. He is professor of sports engineering at Sheffield Hallam University, England and is founding director of the university's advanced wellbeing research centre.

== Education ==
Haake studied physics and the University of Leeds, and went on to do a PhD at Aston University in Birmingham where he was sponsored by The Royal and Ancient Golf Club of St Andrews. His thesis investigated methods for measuring the impact of golf balls on turf.

== Career and research ==
Haake worked at the University of Sheffield, building a sports research group there, before moving to Sheffield Hallam in 2006. He founded the journal Sports Engineering, the International Sports Engineering Association and the International Conference on the Engineering of Sport. He served as director of research for the Sheffield section of the National Centre for Sport and Exercise Medicine from 2014 to 2016, when he was succeeded by Elizabeth Goyder.

Haake is chair of the research board of parkrun, and has said that "useful fitness exercise might just be a 10-minute walk every day". In 2019 he was appointed chair of Sheffield City Region's Active Travel Advisory Board. His research has been funded by the Engineering and Physical Sciences Research Council (EPSRC) and has included research on football, cycling, tennis, and olympic sports.

== Selected publications ==
- Haake, Steve (2018). Advantage play : technologies that changed sporting history. Edinburgh: Arena Sport. ISBN 9781909715592.
- Moritz, Eckehard Fozzy; Haake, Steve, eds. (2006). The engineering of sport: Proceedings of the 2006 biannual conference of the International Sports Engineering Association. New York: Springer. ISBN 0387354603.
- Haake, S. J.; Coe, Andrew, eds. (2000). Tennis science & technology. Blackwell Science. ISBN 978-0632056385.

== Awards and honours ==
In 2014 the Engineering and Physical Sciences Research Council recognised him as a RISE Leader ("Recognising Inspirational Scientists and Engineers").

In September 2020 he was interviewed by Jim Al-Khalili for The Life Scientific.

Haake was appointed Officer of the Order of the British Empire (OBE) in the 2020 Birthday Honours for services to sport.

== Personal life ==
As of September 2020 his personal best time for the marathon is 3 h 17 m; in 2015 he completed the Greater Manchester Marathon in 3 h 15 m 19 s but the course was found to have been 380m short for three years, invalidating the times for 2013-2015.
