= Fibre-reinforced plastic recycling =

Fibre-reinforced plastic recycling is the recovery, reuse, or reprocessing of fibre-reinforced plastic (FRP) waste generated during manufacturing, use, or end-of-life disposal of composite materials. It is considered an alternative to landfills and incineration for composite waste of sectors such as construction, transport, wind energy, marine products, aerospace, electrical equipment, and sporting goods.

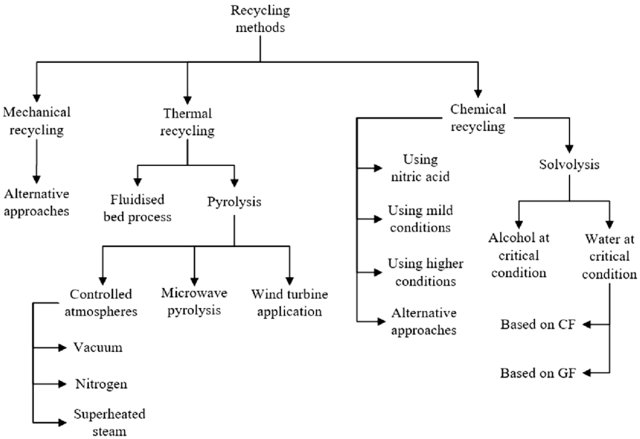
Recycling methods for FRP

FRP recycling is technically difficult because many commercial FRPs are based on thermoset polymer matrices. Once cured, these matrices are chemically cross-linked and cannot be remelted or reshaped like thermoplastics. The recycling of thermoplastic composite is generally more favourable. However, it is still limited though fibre damage, contamination (additives, coatings, adhesives) and the multimaterial design of composite parts. In general, FRP recycling methods can be divided into three categories: mechanical, thermal, and chemical processes.

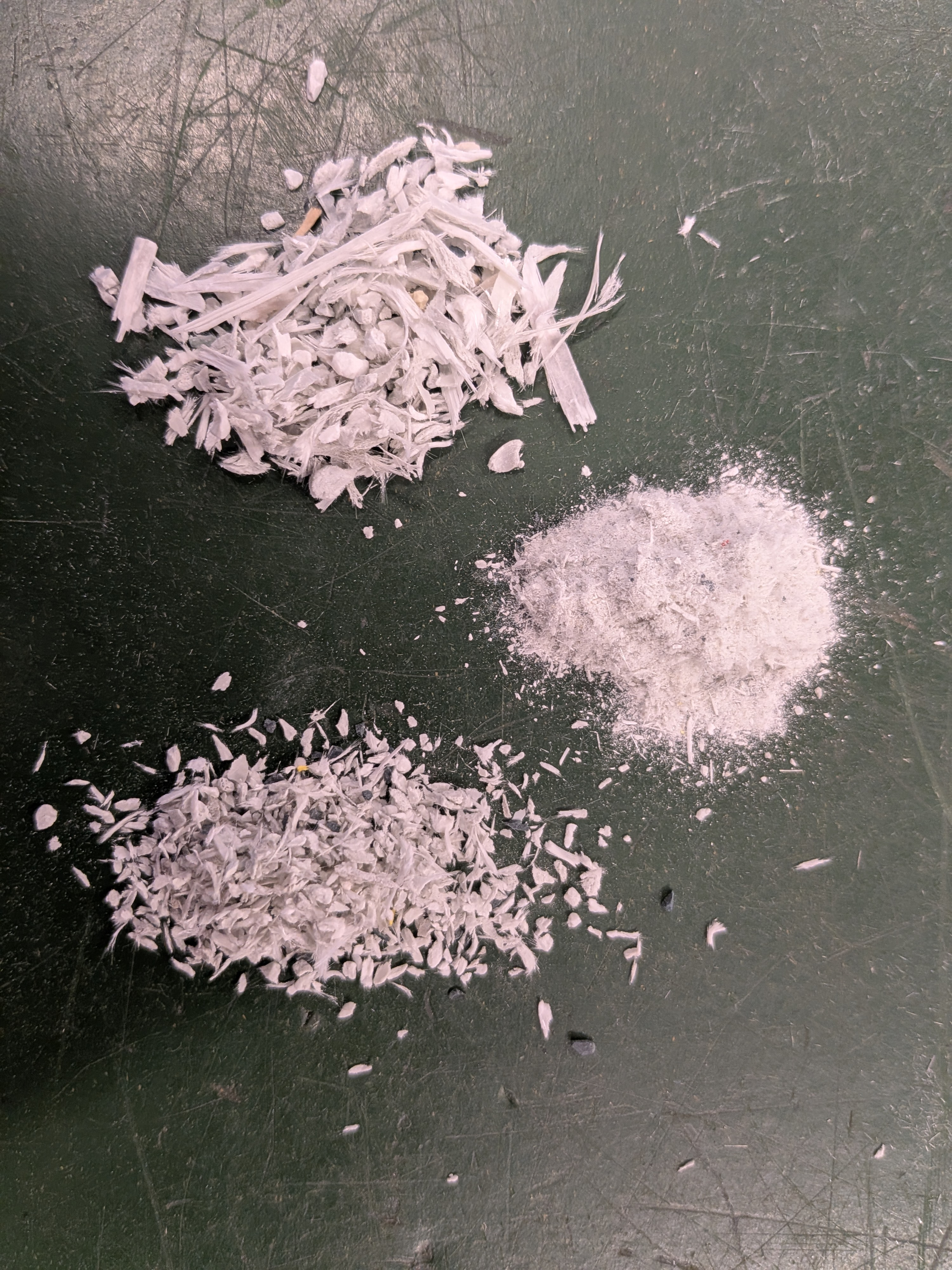
Example of mechanically recycled GFRP

Within each category, different routes exist differing by outputs but also by performance, scalability, energy demand, cost, and industrial implementation. For Europe, thermoset composite waste was estimated at about 914 kt, with about 228 kt realistically accessible for recycling and a maximum of 5% currently recycled. Wind-turbine blades are one of the most widely discussed end-of-life FRP wastes because of their large size, increasing decommissioning volumes, and limited disposal options. Global cumulative wind turbine blade waste has been forecast to reach 43 million tons worldwide by 2050, with Europe accounting for about 25%.

The main goal of FRP recycling is to retain as much material value as possible while reducing the environmental impacts associated with landfilling and incineration as well as the production of raw material. Current research and industrial development focus on improving collection systems, recovering fibres with usable mechanical properties, creating reliable markets for recycled composite materials, and designing future FRP products to be easier to reuse, repair, or recycle.

== Background ==
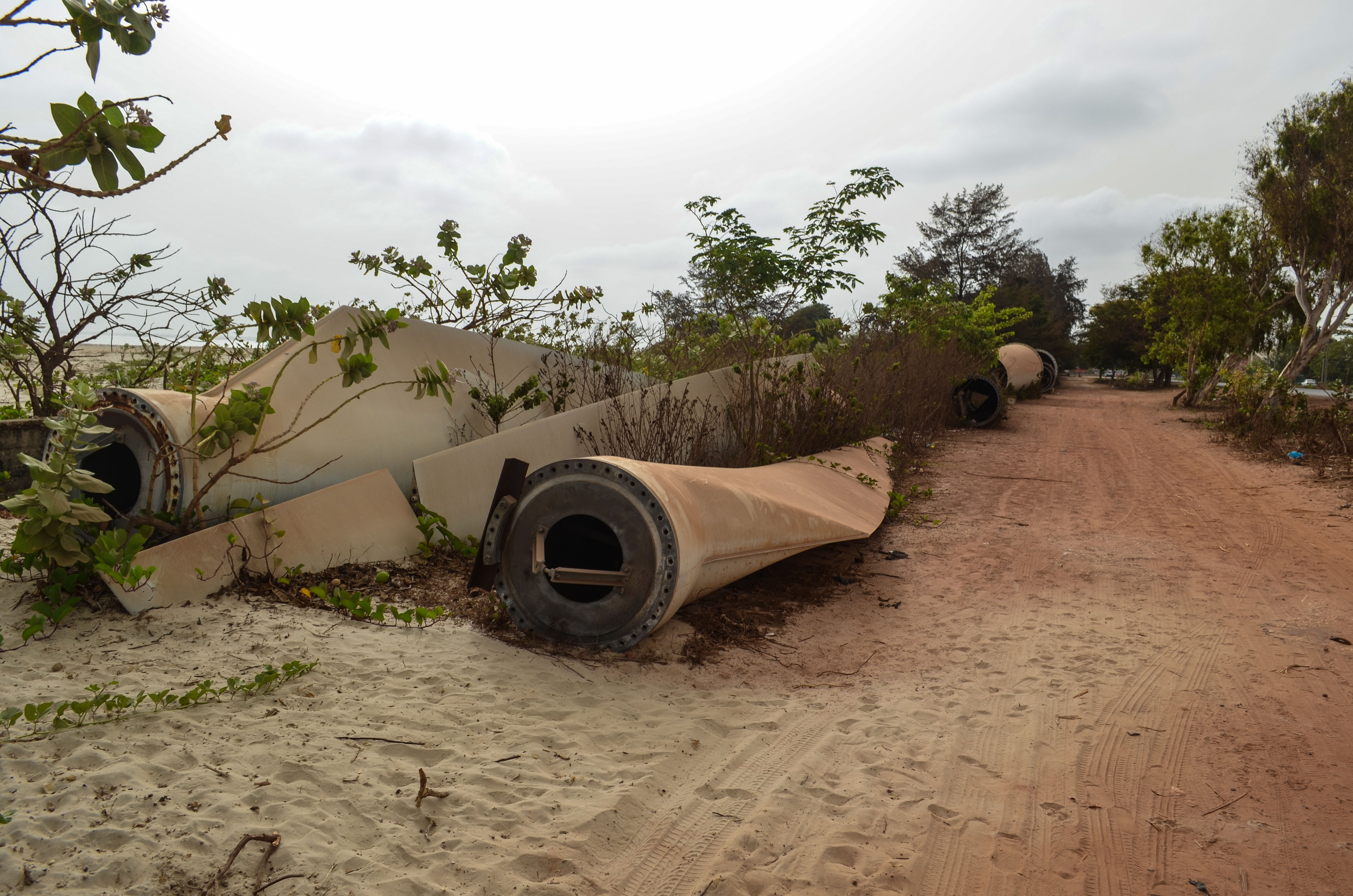
Wind-turbine blade landfill

Discussions of FRP recycling emerged in the late 20th century, as the first generations of composite products approached the end of their service lives. Early research in the 1980s and 1990s focused on the issues posed by thermoset composites, which cannot be remelted and reshaped like thermoplastics. At that time, recycling was not widely implemented, and most FRP waste was disposed of through landfill or incineration due to the lack of economically viable alternatives.

This issue has become more significant in recent decades as the volume of composite waste has significantly increased. Large-scale applications such as wind turbine blades, boats, automotive components, and construction materials have long service lives, meaning that many products installed in the late 20th and early 21st century are approaching the end of their lifespans. At the same time, stricter environmental regulations, landfill restrictions, and sustainability goals have reduced the acceptability of traditional waste management methods.

== Sources of FRP waste ==
FRP waste is generated from two main sources: manufacturing processes and end-of-life products. Manufacturing waste may include offcuts, rejected parts, trimming residues, uncured or cured resins, and other production scraps. End-of-life waste comes from composite products after use, including components from construction, transport, electrical and electronic equipment (E&E), wind energy, marine applications, aerospace, and sports and leisure products.

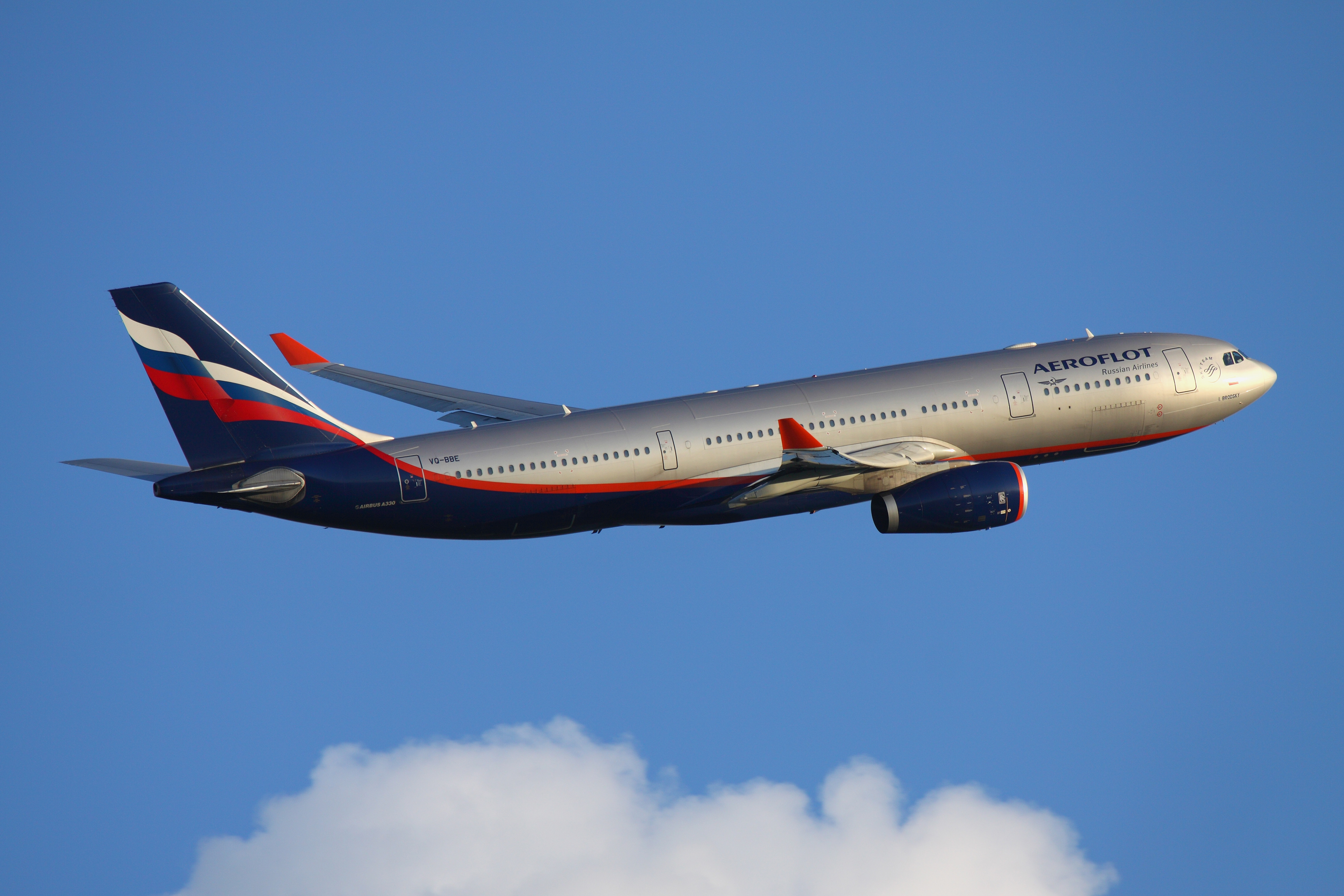
Modern airplane using composite material

The main sources of FRP waste reflect the sectors in which composite materials are used. In Europe, transport accounted for almost half of the total composite production volume in 2024, followed by E&E applications, construction and sports and leisure. However, production volume does not directly correspond to available waste, because many FRP products have long service lives and some are embedded in structures or infrastructure where collection is difficult.

Large composite products have received particular attention because they create concentrated waste streams when decommissioned. Wind turbine blades are a widely cited example. A recent study projected that cumulative global wind turbine blade waste could reach about 43 million tons by 2050. In Europe, the European Composites Industry Association (EuCIA) estimated that around 914 kt of thermoset composite waste could be generated in 2025, but that only 228 kt would be realistically accessible for recycling under current collection and sorting conditions.

== Recycling challenges ==
The recycling potential of FRP depends among other parameters on the type of polymer matrix. Thermoplastic composites can be melted or reshaped when heated, although fibre damage and contamination may still limit the quality of the recovered recycled materials. Unlike thermoplastics, thermoset composites are more difficult to recycle because their polymer matrices are chemically cross-linked after curing. For many years, thermoset composites were predominant in the industry. Nowadays, they still represent more than half of the market. Therefore, many structural FRP products about to reach their end-of-life are based on thermoset resins such as polyester, vinyl ester, or epoxy.

Another difficulty is the multimaterial architecture of FRP products. Composite parts may contain different types of fibres (glass, carbon, aramid, natural fibres) embedded in a polymer matrix, together with fillers, coatings, paints, adhesives, sandwich cores, metallic inserts, and other components. This structure is useful during service life because it enables better mechanical properties, but it complicates material sorting at the end-of-life. For this reason, some studies investigate design for disassembly and design for recycling approaches, in which, when designing the component, these possible issues are considered to facilitate end-of-life treatment.

As for regular plastics, recycling can also reduce the value of the recovered material. These problems will be discussed in detail in the next section. As a consequence, recycled FRP materials are often used in lower-performance applications unless their properties can be reliably controlled.

However, barriers are not exclusively technical. Logistical problems are also a major obstacle. They commonly include collection, sorting, and pre-treatment. Large composite structures, such as wind turbine blades, boat hulls and tanks, often need dismantling, transport, and cutting before they can enter a recycling process. Mixed waste streams may require sorting by fibre type, resin type, product origin, or contamination level, but this information is not always available for older products. Coatings, dirt, moisture, metals, core materials, and other contaminants can reduce recyclate quality or restrict the recycling methods that can be used. These practical steps can form a significant part of the cost and complexity of FRP recycling, especially when waste is geographically dispersed or difficult to access.

== Recycling methods ==
Current approaches to FRP recycling is divided into three categories: mechanical, thermal and chemical. In addition to these, co-processing in cement kilns is used to recover energy and incorporate mineral content into clinker production.

=== Mechanical recycling ===
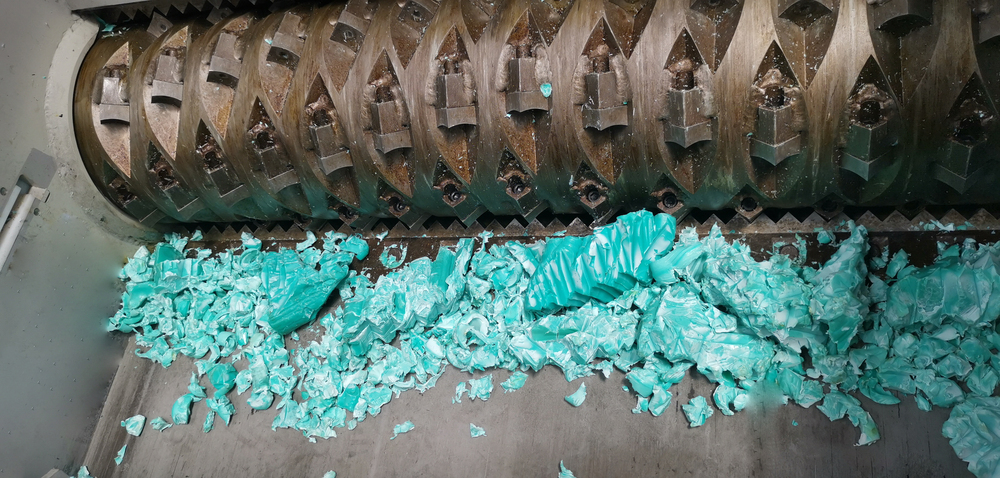
Industrial shredder for plastic waste

Mechanical recycling usually involves one or more size-reduction steps, such as grinding or shredding. During the process, the material is reduced into smaller fractions. The output is a coarse fraction and a fine powder. The process is usually followed by a classification step such as sieving or air classification.

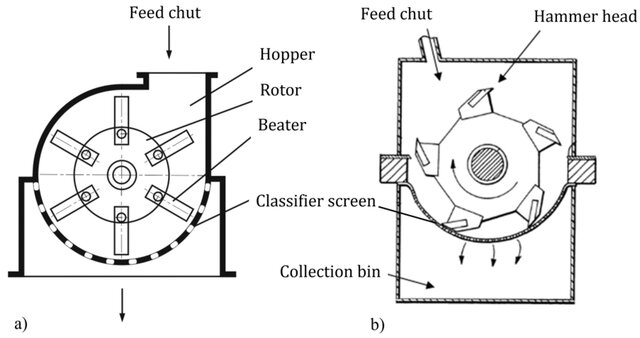
Schematic of mechanical recycling

Unlike other recycling methods, fibres are not separated from the matrix. For this reason, the reuse of these fibres is more difficult, as it raises potential compatibility issues in a new matrix. Instead, the recovered material remains a mixture of fibres, resin, fillers, and other constituents from the original composite. Moreover, recovered material suffers from property loss when compared to virgin fibre, and fibre shortening reduces the overall performance. These recycled fractions can be used as fillers or partial reinforcement in new composite materials, concrete, asphalt, or other lower-value applications. It is also important to note that CFRP composites experience a greater property reduction than GFRP.

The main advantage of mechanical recycling is its relatively low cost, simple operation, and lower technical complexity when compared to many thermal or chemical processes. However, as mentioned before, the process causes fibre shortening and produces heterogeneous recyclates, which can reduce mechanical performance and make it difficult to use the recovered material in high-end applications. Compatibility with a new matrix can also be limited by the presence of cured resin, fillers, coatings, or contaminants from the original product.

Mechanical recycling is commonly seen as more economically suitable for GFRP than for CFRP, because GFRP are produced in larger volumes and have lower virgin fibre value. For CFRP, mechanical recycling is still studied, but routes that better preserve fibre length and fibre quality, such as thermal or chemical recovery, are often preferred when high-value reuse is targeted.

=== Thermal recycling ===
Thermal recycling groups the processes that use high temperatures to decompose the polymer matrix of FRP and recover the fibre reinforcement. The main ways of thermal recycling discussed for FRP waste are pyrolysis and the fluidised-bed process. They can vary according to temperature, residence time, atmosphere, heating method, and post-treatment conditions. However, they are all based on the same general principle: the polymer matrix is thermally broken down while the fibres are isolated.

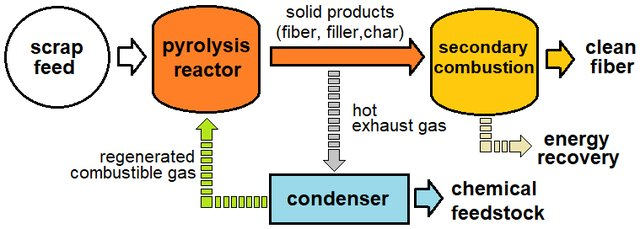
The pyrolysis process

In pyrolysis, composite waste is heated in the absence of oxygen or under low-oxygen conditions. The polymer matrix decomposes into gases, oils, and solid residues, while the fibres can be recovered from the remaining material. Process variants include conventional pyrolysis, microwave pyrolysis, vacuum pyrolysis, and other systems using different heating conditions or atmosphere. Pyrolysis is usually seen as more economically attractive for CFRP than for GFRP, because recovered carbon fibres have a higher potential mechanical and monetary value.

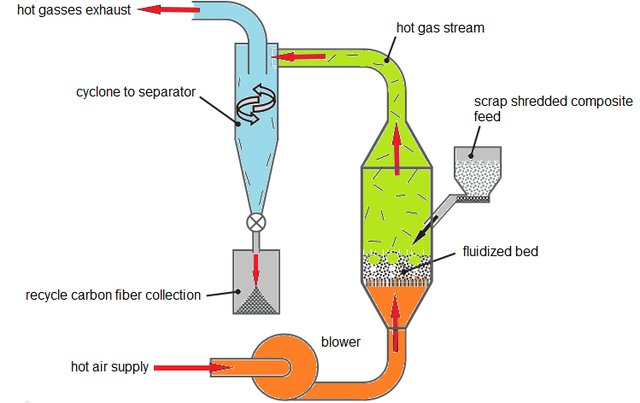
The fluidized-bed-process

Fluidised-bed recycling uses a hot bed of fluidised particles, usually sand, to transfer heat rapidly to shredded composite waste. The polymer matrix is decomposed or combusted, while fibres and inorganic materials are separated from the gas stream. This process can tolerate mixed or contaminated thermoset composite scrap, but the recovered fibres are usually shorter and may have lower mechanical properties than virgin fibres.

A major limitation of thermal recycling is the possible degradation of the recovered fibres. High temperature, oxidation, and post-treatment conditions can reduce fibre strength, remove fibre sizing, or alter the fibre surface, which affects bonding with a new polymer matrix. Thermal recycling can therefore recover useful fibres from FRP waste, but its environmental and economic performance depends on energy demand, process control, emission treatment, fibre quality, and the availability of markets for the recovered fibres and by-products.

=== Chemical recycling ===
Chemical recycling involves processes using solvents to decompose the polymer matrix and separate it from the fibres. Compared to mechanical recycling, the reclaimed fibres are recovered with less shortening and almost preserve the total integrity of their mechanical properties. However, the performance of the process is strongly determined by the original fibre architecture and type, the chemical structure of the material, the solvent used, the environment, and temperature.

Most chemical recycling processes for FRPs are based on solvolysis, in which a solvent is used to break down or dissolve the polymer matrix. Solvolysis routes include hydrolysis, where water is used as the reacting medium, as well as procedures using alcohols, glycols, or other organic solvents. These processes may operate under relatively mild conditions, or under subcritical or supercritical conditions, where higher temperature and pressure can accelerate matrix decomposition.

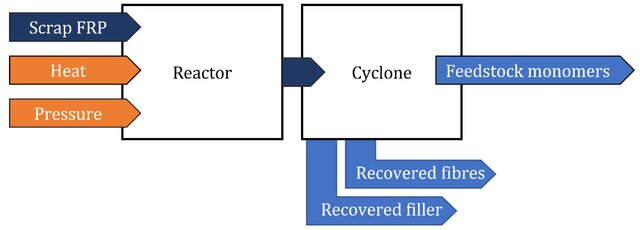
Diagram of the solvolysis process

The choice of solvent and process conditions is mainly determined by the chemistry of the polymer matrix and the desired quality of the recovered fibres and resin-derived products. Epoxy, polyester, vinyl ester, and other thermoset matrices may require different chemical environments to break down effectively. Some processes can also recover organic products from the resin phase, although their value and usability depend on the resin system and recycling conditions.

Chemical recycling is often considered as more attractive for CFRP than for GFRP, because recovered carbon fibres have a higher potential economic value. For GFRP, the relatively low cost of virgin glass fibre can make chemical recycling more difficult to justify economically. The main limitations of chemical recycling include process cost, energy demand, solvent recovery, treatment of chemical residues, and possible environmental impacts associated with the chemicals used. As a result, chemical recycling is an active area of research and industrial development, but its commercial use remains more limited than mechanical recycling for many FRP waste streams.

=== Other and emerging recycling methods ===
Other FRP waste-management routes include cement kiln co-processing, in which composite waste is used as both an energy source and a mineral feedstock. In this process, the organic fraction of the composite, mainly the polymer matrix, contributes energy during cement production, while the inorganic fraction, including fibres and fillers, can be incorporated into clinker. Because of the low-cost of glass fibre, co-processing is mainly relevant for GFRP, where the mineral content can substitute part of the raw materials used in cement manufacturing, although it does not recover fibres for reuse in new composite products.

New recycling methods are currently being developed and tested. Among them, high-voltage fragmentation and delamination-based recycling seem to be promising and are raising more and more attention.

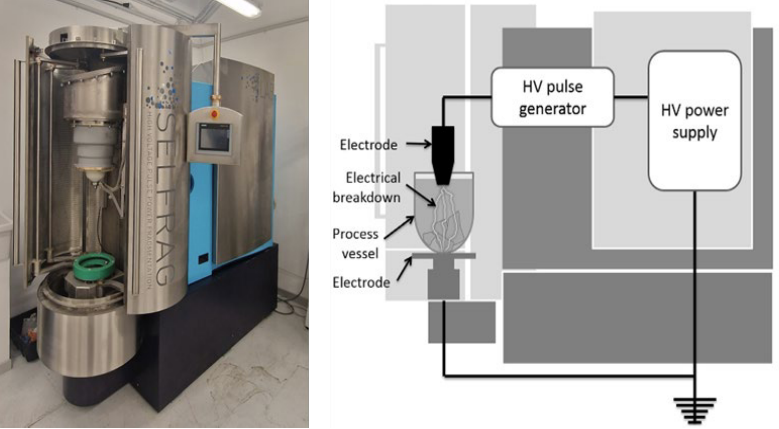
High-Voltage Fragmentation Machine (left) and principle (right)

High-voltage fragmentation is an emerging recycling method that applies short electrical pulses to break composite materials apart. The technique was originally developed for fragmenting rocks and minerals, but has been investigated for separating fibres, matrix and other phases in FRP composites. Compared with conventional mechanical recycling, high-voltage fragmentation may promote separation along material interfaces, but its industrial use for FRP recycling remains currently limited.

Delamination-based recycling aims to separate composite laminates into layers or fibre-rich sheets rather than reducing the whole material into small particles. This approach is being studied for continuous fibre composites because preserving long fibre architecture could retain more value than conventional mechanical recycling. Some proposed methods use heat, solvent, swelling, or specially designed separation layers to weaken the matrix or interlaminar regions. These approaches are generally at an earlier stage of development than more mature recycling processes, but they are of interest for higher-value reuse of composite laminates.

Further research includes the development of recyclable thermoplastic composites, design-for-recycling approaches, and reversible or dynamic polymer matrices that can be more easily separated.

== Environmental and economic aspects ==
The environmental benefit of FRP recycling depends on the recycling process used, the transport distance, the energy source, the quality of the recovered material, and the type of virgin material that is replaced. Life cycle assessment is commonly used to compare end-of-life options for composite materials, including landfill, incineration, cement co-processing, mechanical recycling, thermal recycling, and chemical recycling. Recycling can reduce environmental impacts when it diverts waste from landfill or incineration and when the recycled output substitutes virgin raw materials.

The economic value of recycled FRP depends strongly on the type of fibre and the quality of the recovered material. Recovered carbon fibres usually have higher potential value because virgin carbon is expensive and energy demanding to produce. By contrast, GFRP are produced in larger volumes but are more difficult to recycle economically, because virgin glass fibre is comparatively low-cost and the recovered material is often used in lower-value applications.

Collection, transport, sorting, and pre-treatment are major economic barriers. Many FRP products are large, geographically dispersed, or embedded in infrastructure, which can make recovery more expensive than the recycling process itself. In Europe, EuCIA estimated that although around 914 kt of thermoset composite waste could be generated in 2025, only about 228 kt would be realistically accessible for recycling under current collection and sorting conditions. The same estimate suggested that only a small fraction of accessible thermoset composite waste was being recycled, indicating that recycling infrastructure and markets for secondary composite materials remain limited.

Different recycling routes also produce outputs with different market values. Mechanical recycling is relatively simple and can produce fibre-rich particles or powders, but the recovered material is usually less valuable than the original reinforcement. Thermal and chemical processes can recover fibres with higher potential value, especially from CFRP, but they may require more energy, specialised equipment, or additional treatment of emissions and process chemicals. Cement kiln co-processing is commercially available for some GFRP waste streams and can recover energy and mineral content, but it does not recover fibres for use in new composite products.

The development of economically viable FRP recycling therefore depends not only on recycling technology, but also on waste collection systems, material traceability, product design, certification, and reliable demand for recycled composite materials. In many applications, recycled FRP materials must meet technical standards and quality requirements before they can replace virgin materials, which may limit their use in safety important or highly regulated products.

== Design for circularity and future development ==
Recent developments in FRP recycling increasingly focus on preventing end-of-life problems during product design. This includes design-for-recycling, design-for-disassembly, material simplification, and the selection of matrices, fibres, adhesives, and coatings that are more compatible with reuse or recycling. These approaches aim to reduce the number of inseparable materials in composite products and to make dismantling, sorting, and recovery easier at the end of service life.

One area of development is the use of thermoplastic composites, which can in principle be softened and reprocessed more easily than thermoset composites. However, their recyclability still depends on fibre length, contamination, degradation during processing, and the ability to collect and sort compatible waste streams. Other research focuses on recyclable thermoset systems, including reversible, cleavable, or dynamic polymer networks such as vitrimers, which are designed to retain thermoset-like performance during use while allowing repair, reshaping, or chemical recovery under specific conditions.

Traceability is another challenge for future FRP recycling. Older composite products commonly lack accessible information about fibre type, resin chemistry, additives, coatings, or repair history, which makes sorting and recycling more difficult. Digital product passports and material passports have been proposed as tools to store and communicate information about product composition, repairability, recyclability, and environmental performance throughout the product life cycle. In the European Union, the Ecodesign for Sustainable Products Regulation includes digital product passports as a way to provide information on product sustainability and circularity.

Future progress in FRP recycling is expected to depend on a combination of material innovation, product design, waste collection infrastructure, and as well as market demand for recycled composite materials. No single approach is likely to solve the issue for all FRP products, because waste streams differ widely in fibre type, polymer chemistry, product size, service history, and required performance in second-life applications.

== See also ==
- Circular economy
- Composite material
- Recycled composite components
- Recycling
