= National Centre for Sport and Exercise Medicine =

UK nonprofit

The National Centre for Sport and Exercise Medicine (NCSEM) is an Olympic legacy project delivering education, research and clinical services in sport, exercise and physical activity from three hubs across England. It is a collaboration of universities, healthcare trusts, local authorities and private and voluntary sector organizations.

== History ==
The London Olympic and Paralympic games pledged to provide a lasting health legacy tackling the crucial issues currently threatening health budgets, workforce efficiency and the health of the nation. The National Centre for Sport and Exercise Medicine is a 2012 Olympics Legacy project.

== Themes ==
The NCSEM has five themes; each target a different aspect of the value of physical activity:

- Physical activity in disease prevention
- Exercise in chronic disease
- Sports injuries and musculoskeletal health
- Mental health and wellbeing
- Performance health

== Structure ==
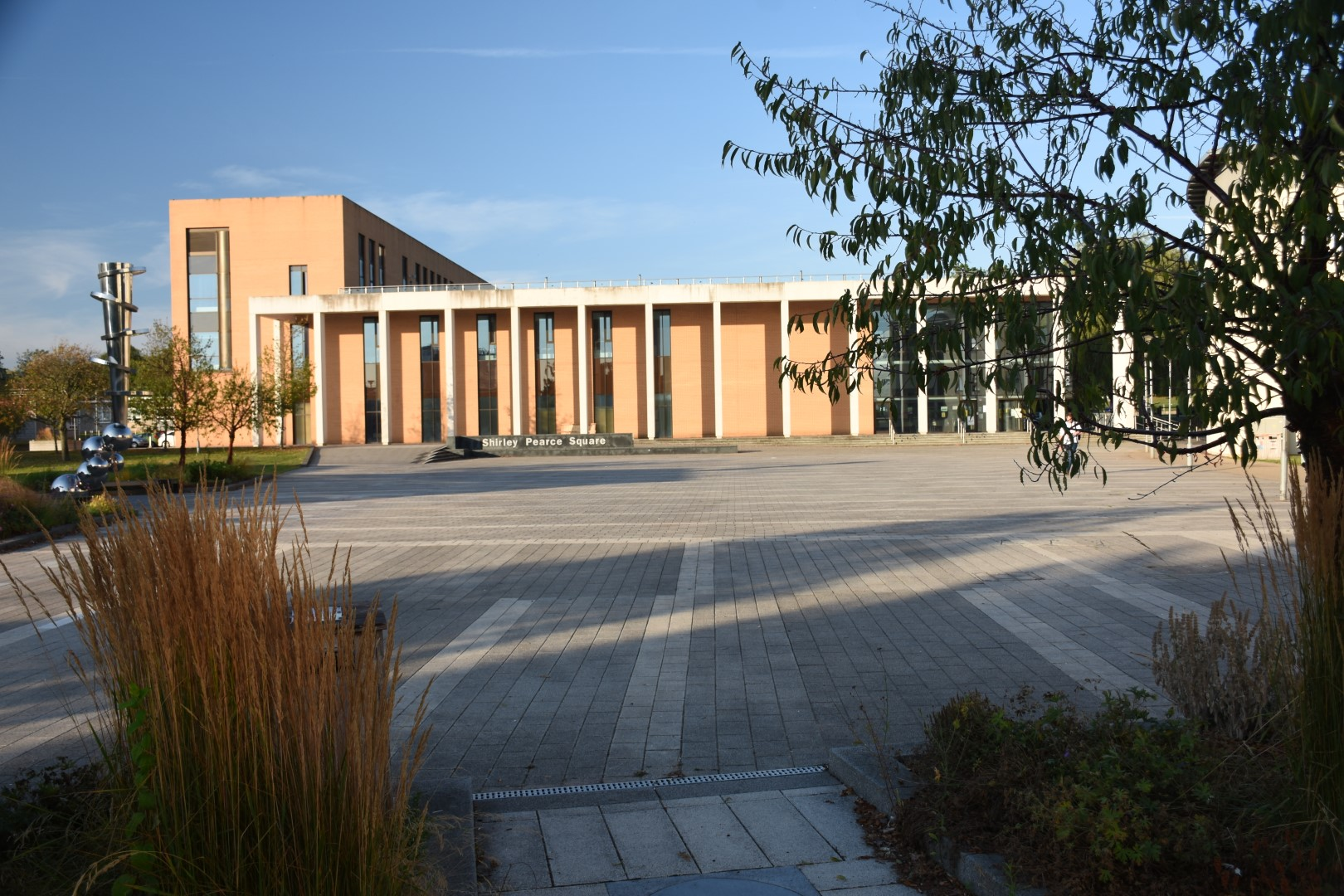
The NCSEM center at Loughborough University, opened in August 2015

The NCSEM consists of three regional hubs based in the East Midlands (Loughborough), London and Sheffield. In each hub, leading academics and healthcare professionals are brought together to build on existing research in the field of sport and exercise medicine and to facilitate the efficient transfer of research into frontline practice. In London the Institute of Sport Exercise and Health (ISEH) specializes in elite sports performance and sports injury management; in the East Midlands the focus is on a strong and broad research base with the aim of accelerating the translation of knowledge into clinical practice; while Sheffield concentrates on citywide testing of community initiatives to increase physical activity.

== Partners ==
East Midlands

- University of Leicester
- Loughborough University
- University of Nottingham
- University Hospitals of Leicester NHS Trust
- Nottingham University Hospitals NHS Trust
- Nottinghamshire Healthcare NHS Foundation Trust

London

- British Olympic Association
- English Institute of Sport
- HCA Healthcare UK
- University College London (UCL)
- University College London Hospitals NHS Foundation Trust

Sheffield

- Sheffield Teaching Hospitals NHS Foundation Trust
- Sheffield Hallam University
- The University of Sheffield
- Sheffield Children's NHS Foundation Trust
- Sheffield Health and Social Care NHS Foundation Trust
- Sheffield City Council
- Sheffield Clinical Commissioning Group
- Voluntary Action Sheffield
- Sheffield Chamber of Commerce
- Sheffield International Venues
- English Institute of Sport

== See also ==
- Olympic Legacy Park, Sheffield
