= Weekly Toyo Keizai =

Japanese business magazine

- Categories: Business magazine
- Frequency: Weekly
- Circulation: 64,185 (2015)
- Publisher: Toyo Keizai Shinposha
- Founded: 1895; 130 years ago
- Company: Toyo Keizai Corporation
- Country: Japan
- Based in: Tokyo
- Language: Japanese
- Website: toyokeizai.net
- ISSN: 0918-5755
- OCLC: 1338354734

Weekly Toyo Keizai (週刊東洋経済, Shūkan Tōyō Keizai) is a weekly business and finance magazine published in Tokyo, Japan. Founded in 1895 it is one of the earliest business publications in the country.

== History and profile ==
The magazine was established in 1895 under the name Toyo Keizai Shimpo. The magazine modelled on the British business magazine The Economist. Weekly Toyo Keizai is part of the Toyo Keizai Corporation, and its publisher is Toyo Keizai Shinposha. The magazine has its headquarters in Tokyo.

Weekly Toyo Keizai targets business executives, businesspeople, business analysts and investors. In May 1934 the English edition of the magazine, The Oriental Economist, was launched. It became a significant reference point for those who would like to be informed about the economy of Japan. The Oriental Economist was published monthly until January 1946 when the Supreme Commander for the Allied Powers demanded that it should be published on a weekly basis. Its frequency was switched to monthly in August 1952, and The Oriental Economist folded in 1986. It was restarted as a website in October 2015.

== Circulation ==
The magazine sold 108,161 copies in 2006. The circulation of Weekly Toyo Keizai was 62,950 copies in 2013. It was 61,411 copies in 2014 and 64,185 in 2015.
