= Death of everything =

Death of everything may refer to:

- Heat death of everything, a hypothesis on the ultimate fate of the universe
- Global catastrophe scenarios, events which may threaten life on Earth
- The Death of Everything, a 1988 album by The Three Johns
- The Death of Everything, a 2006 demo album by Sean McGrath

== See also ==
- End of the World (disambiguation)
- Extinction Event (disambiguation)
- The End of Everything (disambiguation)
- "Everything Dies", a 2009 single by Type O Negative
- Timeline of the far future
- Ultimate fate of the universe
