= Shukatsu (end-of-life planning) =

Practice in Japan

Shūkatsu (終活, end-of-life planning) in Japanese is an abbreviation for "ending activities." It is a term that refers to various preparations and reflections for the final stages of life made with the awareness of one's inevitable mortality. The term is considered to have originated from the magazine Weekly Asahi in 2009 and was nominated for the New Word/Buzzword Award in 2010.

== Background ==
Japan's total population increased after World War II and supported rapid economic growth, but it began to decline after reaching its peak in 2010. This is due to a declining birth rate; however, the elderly population (65 years old and above) continued to grow, as the average life expectancy has extended.

Population Trends in Japan, by age (IPSS Population Statistics)

According to the data from the Statistics Bureau of the Ministry of Internal Affairs and Communications, the proportion of the elderly population, which was around 5% immediately after the end of World War II, has gradually increased. It is predicted to make up approximately one-third of Japan's population by around 2035.

Japanese society is rapidly aging with a declining birthrate, and in the near future, the post-war baby boomer generation will all at once be in need of nursing care and eventually pass away. Therefore, there has currently been an increased awareness among the elderly about the need to prepare for the end of life without causing inconvenience to those around them.

In the early twentieth century, when couples had many children, sometimes as many as ten, it was possible to share responsibility for the care of aging parents and handling affairs after their death. However, in recent times, families often have one or no children, and unmarried people are not uncommon. Furthermore, compared to the early twentieth century, local communities no longer have strong interpersonal relationships; therefore, significant burdens of posthumous chores cannot be placed on the younger generation. These tendencies have contributed to end-of-life planning as a momentous social phenomenon.

== Origin and development ==
Critical aspects of end-of-life planning while alive include preparing for the funeral and grave, resolving personal affairs to avoid causing trouble or inconvenience to others, and ensuring a smooth inheritance process for one's assets by the surviving family members.

Asahi Weekly Logo

The term shūkatsu is considered to have originated from the magazine Weekly Asahi, and it is attributed to the former deputy editor-in-chief of the magazine, Hiroto Sasaki. Since the series of articles related to shūkatsu was published in 2009, the word has spread through the public, along with the numerous book publications discussing the topic. In 2010, shūkatsu was nominated for the New Word/Buzzword Award, and in 2012 it was selected as one of the top ten for the same contest. In 2012, the first organization specializing in shūkatsu, the Association of Comprehensive Ending Care, was established in Hokkaido. In September 2015, it was incorporated as the General Incorporated Association Japan for End-of-Life Planning.

In 2013, Japan's first specialized magazine on shūkatsu, End-of-Life Reader Sonae ('preparation'), was published by Sankei Shimbun. Subsequently, in 2014, there arose a growing trend towards more casual end-of-life planning, including What-If Calendar to make it easier for people to think about and plan for the end of their lives.

End-of-life planning has appeared in featured articles by monthly and weekly magazines such as Bungei Shunjū, Chūōkōron, and Weekly Tōyō Keizai, and it has become a significant social trend from which what is known as the "End-of-life Industry" emerged.

== Support of local governments and businesses ==
Not only is end-of-life planning practiced privately by those who are aware of their mortality with their families, relatives, friends, and acquaintances, but local governments and businesses are also increasingly providing support and advice for such preparation activities.

Yokosuka City, Kanagawa Prefecture, offers a program, "End-of-Life Information Registration and Communication," often referred to as "My End-of-Life Registration." This program is designed for citizens who have few or no close relatives, and allows them to provide information about the storage location of their will and the whereabouts of their grave before their death, ensuring that their posthumous matters are handled appropriately.

Companies engaged in the funeral service business, and trust banks are also involved in end-of-life planning as a business. ENDEX JAPAN, a trade fair, has been held for companies to showcase their services and products.

== Actions ==
=== Preparations ===
An "ending note" and will inform the family in advance on how to conduct a funeral and how to distribute properties. Addressing these concerns may become impossible if one becomes impaired and unable to convey one's intentions. It is, therefore, necessary to express one's wishes before any signs of dementia start to appear.

- End-of-life arrangement: Sorting and organizing one's personal belongings and social relationships while still alive and mobile.
  - When elderly individuals who reside alone pass away unnoticed, the handling of their residence and the disposition of their possessions become societal concerns. When the deceased has children living separately, if there is a significant amount of personal belongings, cleaning up the parent's home can be a substantial burden. Thus, in many cases, heirs hire a professional estate clearance company. Additionally, it is crucial to prearrange one's digital assets, such as data and online registered information, and determine what to do with login IDs and passwords.
  - Regarding social relationships, those who maintain an active role in companies or organizations should train successors while in good health to ensure that there is always someone available to take over in case they no longer fulfill their roles. It is also necessary to proactively step down from important roles that would not function without that person in order to ease the transition. After individuals have died, services are available that send messages on behalf of the deceased via email or other means to convey gratitude and farewell to those who had cared for them. Some elderly individuals, apart from their close people, choose to discontinue sending New Year's cards, indicating that it will be their last card.
- Nursing care: Medical care for elderly individuals with dementia or bedridden conditions. One must also consider whether to opt into life-sustaining treatment. Becoming a member of the Japan Society for Dying with Dignity and indicating one's intentions on life-sustaining treatment can be an option.

=== Funeral ===
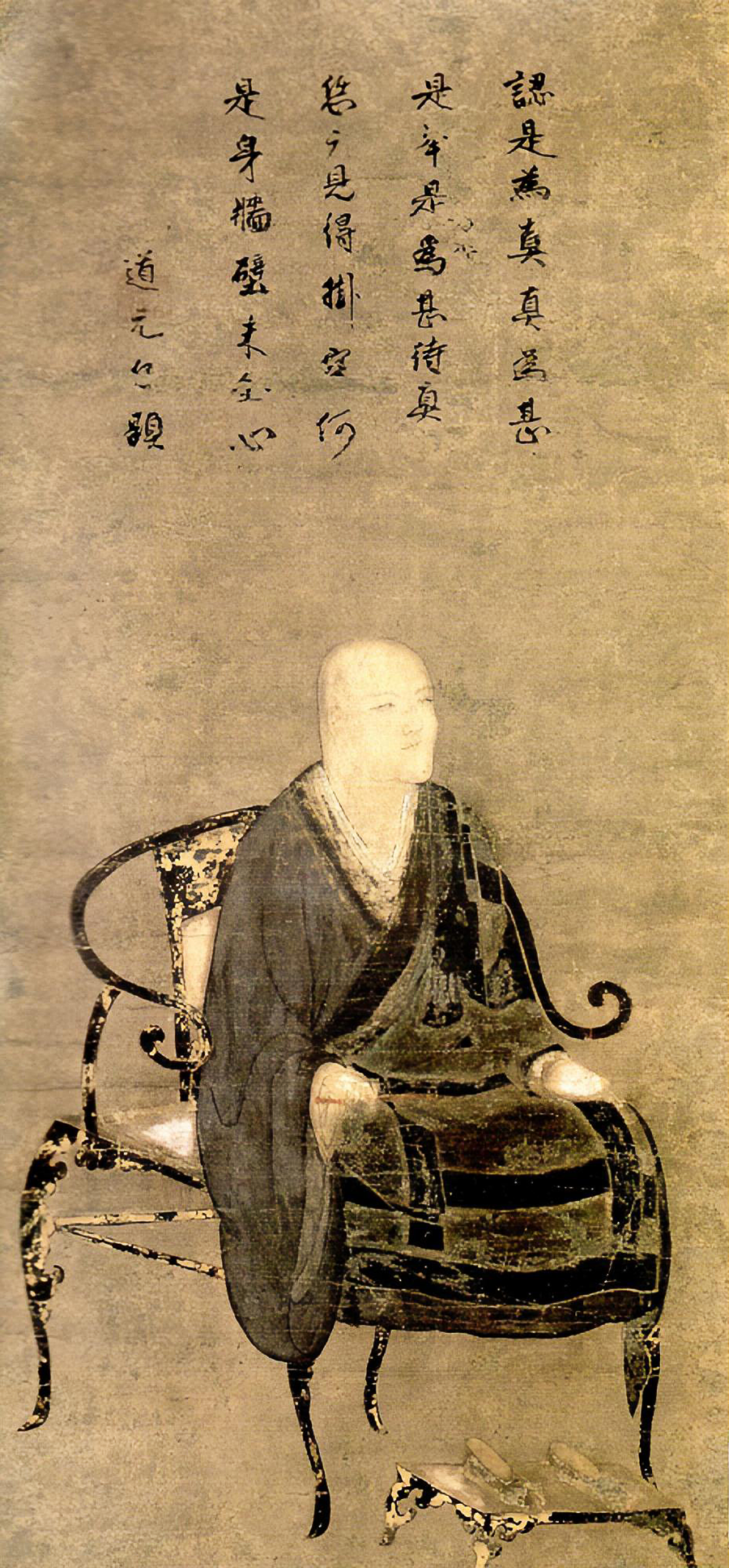
Dōgen Zenji, co-founder of Soto Zen in Japan

- Funeral: Buddhist funeral ceremonies were originally practiced within the Soto Zen sect. When a monk died amidst training on the path to enlightenment, a memorial service was held to console his unfinished aspirations. This practice gradually spread to other Buddhist sects as well. During the Edo period, the concept of village community emerged. When organizing funerals for a member of the village community, temples began to conduct these ceremonial rituals. Recently, it has become increasingly common for funerals to be held with a small number of attendees. When one stops supporting a temple and using its graves or when successive generations do not conduct Buddhist funeral ceremonies, a fee for leaving the temple may be charged. Traditional, grandiose funerals are expensive, so lately, it has become mainstream to conduct private funerals with just close relatives. One camp considers that, since one cannot conduct one's own funeral, it is important to build trusting relationships with those who can undertake that responsibility. Another camp says that end-of-life planning is unnecessary. The rationale behind such a view is that one cannot be responsible for whatever happens after death.
- Living funerals, or seizensō (生前葬): Besides planning a funeral after death, some opt for a funeral to say farewell to acquaintances while still alive. In addition to funeral service companies, travel agencies also started to undertake arrangements.
- Burial: Deciding how to handle the remains of the deceased. Until the medieval period, cemeteries did not build tombstones, but in modern times, tombstones were gradually introduced into graves due to the advent of the danka temple affiliation system and funeral Buddhism (a derisive term referring to the modern-day prevalence of Buddhism focusing on performing lucrative funerals rather than teaching enlightenment). Traditionally, remains were buried in family graves. Once again, there is renewed attention to the issues of neglected and deteriorating graveyards due to the lack of descendants to maintain and perform memorial services, as well as to alleviate the burden on descendants responsible for safeguarding the cemetery and offering memorial rituals.

=== Assets and records ===
- Inheritance: the distribution and disposition of the remaining estate or assets left behind.
- Records: A record of the deceased, such as a profile or personal biography, which some self-publish. Since ancient times, it has been a common practice to engrave the dates of death and posthumous Buddhist names on tombstones or record them in necrologies, preserving the data in the form of family trees. Recently, social networking services (SNS) and other web-based records have become living proof of the deceased's life as they remain after death. Service providers do not verify whether each user is still alive, so blogs and other digital records are left unattended and continue to exist. Records remain not only as text but also in the form of photos and videos. It has recently become possible to attach QR codes to tombstones, allowing them to link to blogs, Facebook, and other online platforms.
- Digital end-of-life planning: Conversely, some individuals prefer to dispose of records related to themselves or acquaintances that touch on privacy concerns, ensuring that others do not access them after their death. In recent times, there has also been an increasing number of people who make advanced arrangements to destroy digital legacies (i.e., large amounts of personal information) on personal computers, smartphones, and other digital storage devices. They may also arrange to delete their websites and accounts from the Internet. These activities are called digital end-of-life planning, and organizations and companies that support such activities have emerged.
