= The End of Everything =

The End of Everything may refer to:

== Books ==
- The End of Everything (Abbott novel), a 2011 novel by Megan Abbott
- The End of Everything (Harrison novel), a 2026 novel by M. John Harrison
- The End of the End of Everything: Stories, a 2015 story collection by Dale Bailey
- The End of Everything (Astrophysically Speaking), a 2020 book on cosmology by Katie Mack

== Music ==
- The End of Everything (album), an album by Moby under the pseudonym Voodoo Child
- The End of Everything (EP), an extended play record by Noah Cyrus
- "End of Everything", a song by Melanie C from the album Melanie C

== Television ==
- "The End of Everything" (Fear the Walking Dead), an episode of zombie series Fear the Walking Dead

== See also ==
- Ultimate fate of the universe
- End of the world (disambiguation)
- Death of everything (disambiguation)
- The End of All Things
