= Deaths in June 2026 =

The following is a list of notable deaths in June 2026.

Entries for each day are listed alphabetically by surname. A typical entry lists information in the following sequence:

- Name, age, country of citizenship at birth, subsequent country of citizenship (if applicable), reason for notability, cause of death (if known), and reference.

== June 2026 ==
=== 1 ===
- Rick Adelman, 79, American basketball player and Hall of Fame coach (Portland Trail Blazers, Sacramento Kings, Houston Rockets).
- Tofail Ahmed, 82, Bangladeshi politician, MP (1973–2024), minister of industries (1996–2006) and commerce (2014–2019).
- Ermanno Arslan, 85, Italian archaeologist.
- Rafi Baranes, 83, Israeli footballer (Maccabi Tel Aviv).
- Areski Belkacem, 86, French singer, musician, and composer.
- Jozien Bensing, 76, Dutch clinical psychologist.
- John Blanche, 77, British fantasy and science fiction illustrator (White Dwarf, Warhammer 40,000).
- Stéphane-Albert Boulais, 76, Canadian writer and film critic.
- Margaret Commodore, 93, Canadian politician, Yukon MLA (1982–1996).
- Probal Dasgupta, 72, Indian Esperantist, president of the Universal Esperanto Association (2007–2013), stroke.
- Souleymane Diallo, 80, Guinean journalist, founder of Le Lynx.
- Kenneth Gagnon, 68, American politician, member of the Maine Senate (2000–2006).
- William Willard Gibson Jr., 94, American lawyer and academic (University of Texas School of Law).
- Raúl Guerrón, 49, Ecuadorian footballer (Deportivo Quito, national team), stomach cancer.
- Alan Haselhurst, Baron Haselhurst, 88, British politician, MP (1970–1974, 1977–2017) and member of the House of Lords (2018–2024).
- Anthony Head, 72, English actor (Buffy the Vampire Slayer, Ted Lasso, Merlin), complications from pneumonia.
- Aleksandr Ivanchenko, 80, Russian writer.
- Pierre Izard, 90, French politician, member (1967–2015) and president (1988–2015) of the general council of Haute-Garonne, mayor of Villefranche-de-Lauragais (1971–2001).
- Igoris Kirilovas, 54, Lithuanian footballer (FK Panerys Vilnius, Hapoel Jerusalem, national team).
- Lois Landgraf, 74, American politician, member of the Colorado House of Representatives (2013–2021).
- Master Parrot, 47–48, Ugandan dancehall and Afro-pop musician, traffic collision.
- Gianni Francesco Mattioli, 86, Italian politician, deputy (1987–2001) and minister of community policies (1998–1999).
- Michael Meadowcroft, 84, English politician, MP (1983–1987).
- Richard Mettler, 56, French-born American film editor (Desert Warrior, Anthropoid, I.S.S.), cancer.
- Keith Anthony Morrison, 84, Jamaican-American painter.
- Marios Oikonomou, 33, Greek footballer (Bologna, AEK Athens, national team), complications from head injury in a traffic collision.
- André Santini, 85, French politician, deputy (2009–2017) and mayor of Issy-les-Moulineaux (since 1980).
- Sir Angus Stirling, 92, British arts administrator and conservationist.
- Bruce Van Sant, 88, American-born Dominican sailor and author.
- Jim Tallas, 89, American politician, member of the Texas House of Representatives (1985–1995).
- Jaan Tults, 80, Estonian rower, referee and coach.
- Stanley Urban, 81, American ice dancer.
- Wei Zongwan, 87, Chinese actor (San Mao Joins the Army, Romance of the Three Kingdoms, 1911).
- Larisa Zhukovskaya, 88, Russian actress (War and Peace, Anna Karenina, The Black Monk).

=== 2 ===
- Nasos Athanasiou, 75, Greek politician, MP (2012–2023).
- Andy Bishop, 61, American racing cyclist, cancer.
- Peabo Bryson, 75, American singer ("If Ever You're in My Arms Again", "Beauty and the Beast", "A Whole New World"), Grammy winner (1993, 1994), complications from a stroke.
- Josep Maria Cadena, 90, Spanish art critic and journalist.
- Sir Neville Cenac, 86, Saint Lucian politician, governor-general (2018–2021) and minister of foreign affairs (1987–1992).
- Daniel Costelle, 90, French documentarist and film director (Apocalypse: The Second World War, Apocalypse: World War I).
- Lyuben Dilov Jr., 61, Bulgarian writer and journalist, MP (2005–2009, since 2021), complications from a heart attack.
- Seham Galal, 54, Egyptian actress, complications from vascular surgery.
- José Carlos Gómez Villamandos, 63, Spanish veterinarian and politician, minister of universities of Andalusia (since 2022) and rector of the University of Córdoba (2014–2022), cancer.
- David J. Halberstam, 74, American radio executive (Westwood One) and sports broadcaster (Miami Heat, St. John's Red Storm), brain cancer.
- Agnes M. Herzberg, 87, Canadian statistician.
- Guts Ishimatsu, 76, Japanese WBC lightweight champion boxer (1974–1976) and actor (Empire of the Sun, Black Rain, Mare), pneumonia.
- Ray Lampkin, 78, American boxer.
- Eszter Láng, 78, Hungarian painter.
- Ken Legan, 79, American politician, member of the Missouri House of Representatives (1981–2002).
- Casey Luna, 95, American racing team owner and politician, lieutenant governor of New Mexico (1991–1995).
- Cláudio Magrão, 72, Brazilian politician, deputy (2003–2007, 2007–2009).
- Nina Marushina, 91, Russian actress (Day by Day).
- Min Htin Ko Ko Gyi, 64–65, Burmese film director, poet and political prisoner, liver cancer.
- Homa Mirafshar, 89, Iranian poet.
- Giorgia Moll, 88, Italian actress (The Quiet American, Lipstick, Contempt).
- Alexey Panteleev, 67, Russian politician, senator (2009–2012).
- Robert Parizeau, 90, Canadian businessman (Fonds de solidarité FTQ).
- Yogesh Patel, 79, Indian politician, Gujarat MLA (since 2012).
- Vyacheslav Sharpar, 39, Ukrainian footballer (Vorskla Poltava, Volyn Lutsk, Riga), drowned.
- George H. Vaughn Jr., 87, American politician, member of the Oklahoma House of Representatives (1973–1995).
- Spider Webb, 81, American jazz drummer.
- David Robert Williams, 71, American aerospace and mechanical engineer, fellow of the American Physical Society.
- Sir Alex Younger, 62, British intelligence officer, chief of the Secret Intelligence Service (2014–2020), pancreatic cancer.
- Wei-Wen Yu, 102, Chinese-born American civil engineer.
- Eleni Zetou, 70, Greek volleyball player (Aris Thessaloniki, national team).

=== 3 ===
- Rocky Allen, 71, American talk radio personality (WPLJ), cancer.
- Eugène Attigan, 55, Togolese journalist and television presenter (Togolese Television).
- Wilhelmus de Bekker, 87, Dutch-born Surinamese Roman Catholic prelate, bishop of Paramaribo (2004–2014).
- Dimitri Bertsekas, 83, Greek mathematician.
- Sterling Betancourt, 96, Trinidadian steelpan music arranger and musician.
- Chung King-fai, 89, Hong Kong actor (Black Mask, My Family, Welcome to the House).
- Charlie Cunningham, 77, American mountain biker, co-founder of Wilderness Trail Bikes, complications from a traffic collision.
- Matthieu d'Epenoux, 60, French businessman and board game designer.
- Jagannath Prasad Das, 90, Indian writer and poet.
- Jaba Dvali, 41, Georgian footballer (Zestaponi, Dinamo Tbilisi, national team), heart attack.
- Theo Fischer, 88, Swiss politician, MP (1979–1999).
- Lily-Mae Fisher, 31, British Royal Navy lieutenant, helicopter crash.
- James Handy, 81, American actor (Top Gun: Maverick, The Rocketeer, Alias), stabbed.
- Margriet Hermans, 72, Belgian singer and politician, senator (2007–2011), euthanasia.
- Kanya King, 57, British businesswoman, founder of the MOBO Awards, colon cancer.
- Max Kleven, 92, Norwegian-born American stuntman and second unit director (Back to the Future, Batman Returns, The River Wild).
- Lieke Marsman, 35, Dutch poet, cancer.
- Rutsel Martha, 70, Dutch politician.
- Herbert Möller, 103, German politician, member of the Landtag of Schleswig-Holstein (1985–1987).
- Marita Monteleone, 68, Argentine radio broadcaster.
- Angela Morant, 85, British actress (I, Claudius, Brookside, Dixon of Dock Green).
- Reha Muhtar, 66, Turkish television anchor (TRT, Show TV) and newspaper columnist (Vatan), heart failure.
- Patrick Négrier, 70, French philosopher.
- Pat Pappas, 89, American businessman and politician, member of the Arkansas House of Representatives (1995–2000).
- Peter Potichnyj, 96, Polish-Ukrainian-born American-Canadian political scientist and historian.
- Jouko Purontakanen, 78, Finnish sports executive.
- A. K. M. Rahmatullah, 75, Bangladeshi politician, MP (1986–1987, 1996–2001, 2009–2024).
- Lalith J. Rao, 83, Indian classical singer.
- Marjane Satrapi, 56, Iranian-French graphic novelist (Persepolis) and film director (Persepolis, Dear Paris).
- Axel Schreiber, 49, German actor (Türkisch für Anfänger, Berlin by the Sea), cancer.
- Fergus Slattery, 77, Irish Hall of Fame rugby union player (British & Irish Lions, Barbarians, national team).
- Tutu Sohlberg, 84, Finnish Olympic equestrian (1988).
- Fermín Sola Barrena, 52, Spanish police officer, traffic collision.
- Bobby Tambling, 84, English football player (Chelsea, Crystal Palace, national team) and manager.
- James Blood Ulmer, 86, American guitarist.
- Price Wallace, 64, American politician, member of the Mississippi House of Representatives (since 2018).
- Henry Malcolm Whyte, 105, Australian physician.
- Whatarangi Winiata, 90, New Zealand Māori academic, founder of Te Wānanga o Raukawa.
- Norma Yaeger, 96, American stockbroker.

=== 4 ===
- Claudio Appiani, 69, Italian rugby union player (Calvisano, national team).
- Norman Balon, 99, British publican (Coach and Horses).
- George Berzsenyi, 87, Hungarian-American mathematician.
- Robert Coles, 97, American child psychiatrist and author (Children of Crisis), Pulitzer Prize winner (1973).
- Aaron Cook, 46, Welsh footballer (Salisbury City, Gosport Borough, Bemerton Heath Harlequins), esophageal cancer.
- Muhammad al-Fayadh, 95, Afghan-born Iraqi marja'.
- Patrick Godfrey, 93, English actor (Maurice, The Count of Monte Cristo, Ever After).
- Eddie Haas, 91, American baseball player (Chicago Cubs, Milwaukee Braves) and manager (Atlanta Braves).
- Cor Herkströter, 88, Dutch oil industry executive.
- Valentina Ignatyeva, 77, Russian actress.
- Nathan Irby, 94, American politician, member of the Maryland Senate (1982–1995), heart failure.
- Greg James, 71, American tattoo artist.
- Ned Jarrett, 93, American Hall of Fame racing driver (NASCAR) and broadcaster, two-time Cup Series champion (1961, 1965).
- Jin Ze, 33, Chinese actor.
- Hans Jorritsma, 77, Dutch Olympic field hockey player (1976).
- Subhash C. Kashyap, 97, Indian political scientist.
- Georgy Kleiner, 80, Russian economist.
- Bob Lacey, 72, American baseball player (Oakland Athletics, San Francisco Giants, Cleveland Indians).
- Wendy Law, 65, British crossword compiler, cancer.
- Leivinha, 76, Brazilian footballer (Palmeiras, Portuguesa, national team).
- Sheila Mitchell, 100, British actress (Lillie, Z-Cars, Grange Hill) and author.
- Pahlaj Nihalani, 76, Indian film producer (Aankhen, Shola Aur Shabnam).
- Edward Ntshingila, South African politician, MP (since 2024).
- John D. Ong, 92, American manufacturing industry executive and diplomat, CEO of Goodrich Corporation (1979–1986) and ambassador to Norway (2002–2005), kidney failure.
- Genito Ortiz, 78, Spanish rally driver.
- Gary Piantedosi, 71, American Olympic rower (1976), cancer.
- Marius Romme, 92, Dutch psychiatrist.
- José Sanfilippo, 91, Argentine footballer (San Lorenzo, EC Bahia, national team).
- Ken Shine, 78, Australian rugby league coach (South Sydney Rabbitohs).
- Jane Idleman Smith, 88, American scholar.
- Antonius Agus Sriyono, 69, Indonesian diplomat.
- Sir John Swan, 90, Bermudian politician, premier (1982–1995).
- Anantrao Thopate, 93, Indian politician, three-time Maharashtra MLA.
- Amin Tojiyev, 79, Uzbek politician, chairman of the Council of Ministers of Karakalpakstan (1989–1992, 1998–2002).
- Rabilal Tudu, 76, Indian Santali writer.
- Chunchuna Villafañe, 92, Argentine actress (No toquen a la nena, The Official Story, I Never Been in Vienna).
- John B. Williams, 85, American double bassist and bass guitarist (The Tonight Show, The Arsenio Hall Show).
- Blenda Wilson, 85, American academic administrator.
- Jim Wooten, 88, American journalist.
- Nur Yalman, 95, Turkish social anthropologist.

=== 5 ===
- Roar Arntzen, 78, Norwegian engineer.
- Manuel Domingos Augusto, 68, Angolan journalist and politician, minister of foreign affairs (2017–2020).
- Waldemar Bohdanowicz, 85, Polish politician, mayor of Łódź (1989–1990), senator (1991–1993).
- James Bradley, 72, American author (Flags of Our Fathers, Flyboys: A True Story of Courage, The Imperial Cruise).
- Bernadette Chirac, 93, French politician, spouse of the president (1995–2007).
- Christiane Cohendy, 86, French actress (The Creator, The Horseman on the Roof, The Passerby).
- Denis Coughlan, 80, Irish Gaelic footballer and hurler (Glen Rovers, St. Nicholas').
- Sam Dastor, 84, Indian-born British actor (Jinnah, The Life and Death of Peter Sellers, I, Claudius), cancer.
- Cliff Fletcher, 90, Canadian Hall of Fame ice hockey executive (Calgary Flames, Toronto Maple Leafs, Phoenix Coyotes).
- Ignacio Gómez Aristizábal, 96, Colombian Roman Catholic prelate, bishop of Ocaña (1972–1992) and archbishop of Santa Fe de Antioquia (1992–2007).
- Ovidio Granados, 84, Colombian vallenato accordionist and songwriter.
- Inman Harvey, British computer scientist.
- Lady Pamela Hicks, 97, British aristocrat.
- Tamás Horváth, 35, Hungarian footballer (Kaposvári Rákóczi).
- Raymond Llewellyn, 97, Welsh actor (Doctor Who, The Owl Service, The Thief of Baghdad).
- Jürgen Kesting, 85, German journalist and music critic.
- Peter Klopfer, 95, German-American zoologist.
- Olufemi Majekodunmi, 86, British-Nigerian architect.
- Charles Marvin, 97, American football coach (Adrian Bulldogs).
- Gerry Meehan, 79, Canadian ice hockey player (Buffalo Sabres, Washington Capitals, Atlanta Flames) and executive.
- Yrondu Musavu-King, 34, Gabonese footballer (Boulogne, Le Mans, national team).
- Naran Ochir-Goryaev, 52, Russian military senior lieutenant and Hero of the Russian Federation.
- Ian A. O'Connor, 81, American air force colonel and author.
- Kenneth Prewitt, 90, American academic.
- Vania Protti Traxler, 89, Italian entrepreneur.
- Manoa Rasigatale, 78, Fijian politician and historian, senator (1992–1999).
- Heimo Reinitzer, 82, Austrian Olympic discus thrower (1968, 1972).
- Talay Riley, 35, British singer ("Make You Mine") and songwriter ("Young Dumb & Broke", "Bounce"), stabbed.
- Joost Ritman, 85, Dutch businessman (Bibliotheca Philosophica Hermetica).
- Sadıq Sadıqov, 60, Azerbaijani football executive, president of Neftçi (2009–2015).
- Jokke Seppälä, 72, Finnish musician.
- David Sheiner, 98, American actor (A Man Called Gannon, Winning, The Odd Couple), renal failure.
- Michael Shur, 83, Soviet-born American physicist and academic.
- Indio Solari, 77, Argentine musician (Patricio Rey y sus Redonditos de Ricota).
- Georgios Souflias, 84, Greek politician, minister of national economy (1989–1990), education (1991–1993), and the environment (2004–2009).
- A. C. Sreehari, 56, Indian poet and writer.
- Michael Tate, 80, Australian politician and Catholic priest, senator (1978–1993).
- Yoshihisa Uchida, 101, Japanese politician, member of the Aichi Prefectural Assembly (1963–1971) and mayor of Okazaki, Aichi (1971–1980).
- Francine Villeneuve, 61, Canadian jockey and racing pioneer.
- Yehudah L. Werner, 95, Israeli herpetologist and academic.
- Agaath Witteman, 84, Dutch theatre director and politician, senator (2003–2007).

=== 6 ===
- Dafydd ab Hugh, 65, American author (Star Trek, Doom).
- Osório Citora Afonso, 54, Mozambican Roman Catholic prelate, auxiliary bishop of Maputo (2023–2025) and bishop of Quelimane (since 2025), shot.
- Abdul Ganiyu Ambali, 68, Nigerian academic administrator, vice chancellor of the University of Ilorin (2012–2017).
- Hans Chrunak, 77, Swedish swimming coach.
- Ernie Cunliffe, 88, American Olympic runner (1960).
- Ibrohim Gʻafurov, 88, Uzbek writer, translator and politician, MP (1999–2004).
- Anthony Guidera, 65, American actor (Species, The Godfather Part III, The Rock) and model.
- Alan Hale, 67, American astronomer, co-discoverer of Comet Hale–Bopp.
- William Hasley, 78, American biographer and television writer (Swift Justice, The Smurfs, The Young Riders).
- Michael Jackson, 72, American convicted murderer.
- Julio Jung, 84, Chilean actor (Coronation, El regalo, And Suddenly the Dawn) and radio announcer.
- Ingeborg Kaiser, 95, German-Swiss writer.
- Musaazi Charles Kalooli, 32, Ugandan social media influencer, injuries sustained from a fall.
- David Kaplunov, 91, Russian scientist.
- Salim Kumar, 56, Indian film director (Karutha Joothan) and actor (Achanurangatha Veedu, Adaminte Makan Abu), liver disease.
- John Loring, 86, American fashion design director (Tiffany & Co.).
- Víctor Mendoza, 62, Ecuadorian footballer (Barcelona, national team), heart, lung and kidney disease.
- Andrew Morgan, 92, British Olympic cross-country skier (1956, 1960, 1964).
- Bob Packwood, 93, American politician, member of the U.S. Senate (1969–1995) and the Oregon House of Representatives (1963–1969).
- Jane Pegel, 92, American sailor.
- Lee Raymond, 87, American oil executive, chairman and CEO of ExxonMobil (1987–2005), pneumonia.
- Alan Riding, 82, British journalist (The New York Times), cancer.
- Elfie Semotan, 84, Austrian fashion photographer.
- Karel Tejkal, 88, Czech radio journalist and publicist.
- Ute Walther, 83, German mezzo-soprano (Deutsche Oper Berlin).
- Shirley Wershba, 103, American radio and television news producer.
- Robert Louis Wilken, 89, American historian.
- Peter Wilkinson, 86, Canadian Roman Catholic priest.
- Dieter Wunderlich, 88, German linguist.

=== 7 ===
- Lehbib Mohamed Abdelaziz, 37, Sahrawi military commander, drone strike.
- Alfio Brina, 84, Italian politician, deputy (1983–1987), senator (1987–1994).
- Fatjon Bunjaku, 22, Kosovar footballer (Phoenix Banjë, Malisheva, AF Elbasani), traffic collision.
- Ernie Caffrey, 89, Irish politician, senator (1997–2002).
- Rosemary M. Collyer, 80, American jurist, judge of the U.S. District Court for D.C. (since 2002), Foreign Intelligence Surveillance Court (2013–2020), and Alien Terrorist Removal Court (2016–2020).
- Louis Donnadieu, 96, French politician, three-time deputy, mayor of Bout-du-Pont-de-Larn (1971–1989).
- Dorothy E. Downton, 79, American congressional staff member, personal secretary to the president (1974–1977).
- María Rosa Fugazot, 83, Argentine actress.
- Sidney Green, 96, Canadian politician, member of the Legislative Assembly of Manitoba (1966–1981).
- Mangal Prasad Gupta, 80, Nepali politician, MP (2022–2025).
- Andrew Paul Gutiérrez, 86, American entomologist and ecologist.
- Maria Haiduc, 86, Romanian folk singer.
- Stacey King, 59, American basketball player (Chicago Bulls) and broadcaster, three-time NBA champion (1991, 1992, 1993), fall.
- Yishai Levi, 63, Israeli Mizrahi music singer.
- Arvi Lind, 85, Finnish television news presenter (Yle TV1).
- Prakash Mallavarapu, 77, Indian Roman Catholic prelate, bishop of Cuddapah (1998–2002) and Vijayawada (2002–2012), archbishop of Visakhapatnam (2012–2024).
- István Mihalecz, 78, Hungarian football player (Zalaegerszegi TE) and manager (Szombathelyi Haladás, Nagykanizsa FC).
- Dennis Parrett, 66, American politician, member of the Kentucky Senate (2011–2023).
- Lance Rentzel, 82, American football player (Dallas Cowboys, Los Angeles Rams, Minnesota Vikings).
- Robert Ricklefs, 83, American ornithologist.
- Wolfgang Schleidt, 98, Austrian scientist.
- Richard Scolyer, 59, Australian pathologist, glioblastoma.
- Vsevolod Sevastyanov, 88, Russian politician, member of the Legislative Assembly of Krasnoyarsk Krai (1994–2016).
- Roger K. Summit, 95, American research scientist, traffic collision.
- J. David Thomas, 94, British papyrologist and classical scholar.
- Wilma Tisch, 98, American philanthropist.
- Werner Trzmiel, 84, German Olympic hurdler (1964, 1968).
- V. Vikramraju, 92, Indian cricket umpire.
- Jeannette Weiss Gruber, 91, French glass painter.
- Gordon S. Wood, 92, American historian (The Radicalism of the American Revolution, Empire of Liberty: A History of the Early Republic, 1789–1815), Pulitzer Prize winner (1993), traffic collision.
- Ben Aziz Zagré, 27, Burkinabè footballer (Kaisar, Shinnik Yaroslavl, national team), bone cancer.

=== 8 ===
- Myktybek Abdyldayev, 72, Kyrgyz politician, speaker (2020) and member (since 2010) of the Supreme Council.
- Divine Adili, 21, Nigerian basketball player (Ateneo Blue Eagles), drowned.
- Linda Amos, 79, English Olympic swimmer (1964).
- Rene Baterbonia, 19, Filipino basketball player (Ateneo Blue Eagles), drowned.
- Nicholas Blurton-Jones, 90, British biologist and evolutionary anthropologist.
- Bo Brown, 81, American politician, member of the Mississippi House of Representatives (since 2020).
- Jean Fourié, 81, French writer and community activist.
- Masahiro Futahashi, 84, Japanese politician, deputy chief cabinet secretary (2003–2006, 2007–2008), pneumonia.
- Julian Garrett, 85, American politician, member of the Iowa Senate (since 2013), prostate cancer.
- Robert Greenidge, 76, Trinidadian steelpan player (Coral Reefer Band), stroke.
- Jean Houde, 86, French Olympic sprint canoer (1960).
- Hans Kaufmann, 77, Swiss politician, MP (1999–2014).
- Yōhei Kōno, 89, Japanese politician, twice minister for foreign affairs, deputy prime minister (1994–1995) and speaker of the House of Representatives (2003–2009), pancreatic cancer.
- Juan Andrés Larre, 58, Uruguayan footballer (Chamois Niortais, Gazélec Ajaccio, national team).
- Guy Liebmann, 90, American politician, mayor of Oklahoma City (2003–2004) and member of the Oklahoma House of Representatives (2005–2013).
- Hans Maier, 94, German politician, member of the Landtag of Bavaria (1978–1987)
- Paolo Manunza, 71, Italian footballer (Teramo, Piacenza, Ragusa).
- Turgun Mashrapova, 98, Kyrgyz politician, member of the Supreme Soviet of the Soviet Union (1974–1979).
- Josip Milković, 83, Croatian handball player and coach.
- Tim Mountford, 80, American Olympic cyclist (1964, 1968).
- Helmut Nadolski, 83, Polish musician.
- Oto Neubauer, 95, Czech politician, senator (1996–1998), mayor of Trmice (1994–2006).
- Piero Pasini, 84, Italian basketball coach.
- Michael Preston, 93, English actor (Mad Max 2, Homicide, Bellbird) and singer.
- Alain Schifres, 87, French journalist (Réalités, Le Nouvel Observateur).
- Thomas J. Schoenbaum, 86, American lawyer and legal scholar.
- Monika Silva Koniuszek, 41, Polish anti-corruption activist.
- Roberto Soffritti, 84, Italian politician, deputy (2006–2008).
- Nikke Ström, 75, Swedish rock musician (Nationalteatern), complications from heart surgery.
- Mauro Viviani, 76, Italian footballer (Leonzio, Colligiana, Akragas).
- Orlando Watters, 54, American football player (Seattle Seahawks).

=== 9 ===
- Iain Anderson, 95, Scottish cricketer and automotive industry executive.
- Jerzy Bańczerowski, 88, Polish philologist.
- W. R. Berkley, 80, American insurance executive, founder of W. R. Berkley Corporation.
- Patrizia Caselli, 66, Italian actress (City Limits) and television presenter, lung cancer.
- Horace Casey, 91, American electrical engineer, fellow of the Institute of Electrical and Electronics Engineers.
- Mehdi Charef, 73, French film director (Tea in the Harem, In the Country of Juliets, Summer of '62).
- Bill Cody, 67, American radio host (Grand Ole Opry), kidney and heart failure.
- Anderson Dilworth, 96, American businessman and politician, member of the Georgia House of Representatives (1959–1960).
- Matteo Fantuzzi, 46, Italian poet, cancer.
- Sophie Faucher, 68, Canadian actress (Bethune: The Making of a Hero, Ding et Dong), voice actress and scriptwriter, cancer.
- Gina Ferrall, 67, American actress.
- Wolfgang Gust, 91, German historian and journalist (Der Spiegel).
- Karin Illgen, 85, German Olympic discus thrower (1968).
- Gilad Janklowicz, 71, Israeli-born American fitness coach.
- Heinz-Jürgen Koloczek, 82, German politician, mayor of Tuttlingen (1980–2004).
- Kwon Heon-seong, 67, South Korean politician, MP (1988–1992).
- Cyril Karabus, 91, South African paediatric oncologist.
- Alexander Licht, 73, German politician, member of the Landtag of Rhineland-Palatinate (1991–2020).
- Angelina Mas Joaniquet, 82, Andorran social activist.
- Duane Michals, 94, American photographer.
- Charles Mistretta, 85, American medical physicist.
- F. John Monahan, 82, American politician, member of the Massachusetts House of Representatives (1979–1983).
- Tamao Nakamura, 86, Japanese actress (The River with No Bridge, Satan's Sword, The Human Condition III: A Soldier's Prayer), pneumonia.
- Natalie Ng, 51, Hong Kong actress, breast cancer.
- Ciarán Ó Lionáird, 38, Irish Olympic runner (2012).
- John Pappageorge, 94, American politician, member of the Michigan Senate (2007–2014) and House of Representatives (1999–2004).
- Beatriz Pardi, 84, Brazilian politician, São Paulo MLA (1991–1999).
- Keith Piper, 56, English cricketer (Warwickshire), cancer.
- Titta Pretto, 93, Indian singer and comedian.
- Albert Sans, 94, Spanish choreographer and dancer.
- Barney Schoby, 87, American politician, member of the Mississippi House of Representatives (1980–1997).
- Janie Sell, 86, American actress (Over Here!) and singer, Tony winner (1986).
- Orlando Senna, 86, Brazilian film director (Iracema: Uma Transa Amazônica).
- Bob Simmons, 77, American football coach (Oklahoma State Cowboys).
- Corrado Solari, 77, Italian actor.
- Don Stallings, 87, American football player (Washington Redskins).
- Dick Strahm, 92, American football coach (Findlay Oilers).
- Susan Sullivan, 79, American politician, member of the Alaska House of Representatives (1975–1977).
- Bruno Turner, 95, British musicologist.
- Yulen Uralov, 101, Ukrainian Olympic fencer (1952).
- Larry Walker, 84, American politician, member of the Georgia House of Representatives (1973–2005).
- Ruth Watson Henderson, 93, Canadian composer and pianist.
- Alexander Yanchulev, 87, Bulgarian politician and civil engineer, member of the Grand National Assembly (1990–1991), mayor of Sofia (1991–1996).

=== 10 ===
- Hüseyin Kenan Aydın, 63, Turkish-born German politician, MP (2005–2009).
- Dick Barbour, 85, American racing driver, motorsport team owner and businessman.
- Bharathiraja, 84, Indian film director (16 Vayathinile, Vedham Pudhithu, Kadal Pookkal), screenwriter and producer.
- Viacheslav Bielskyi, 72, Ukrainian politician, deputy (1994–1998).
- Arthur Buikema, 85, American biologist and ecologist.
- Petru Cadar, 77, Romanian footballer (SR Brașov).
- David Cayley, 80, Canadian writer and broadcaster.
- Lyudmila Chursina, 84, Russian actress (The Adjutant of His Excellency, A Little Crane, The Andromeda Nebula).
- Tino Conti, 80, Italian Olympic cyclist (1968).
- Pascal Corminboeuf, 82, Swiss politician, member of the Council of State of the Canton of Fribourg (1996–2011).
- Beppe Costa, 84, Italian writer.
- David Fairrington, 85, American painter.
- Vladas Garastas, 94, Lithuanian basketball coach (Žalgiris, Soviet Union national team, national team).
- Wes Gardner, 65, American baseball player (New York Mets, Boston Red Sox).
- Dieter Glemser, 87, German racing driver.
- Thomas Alan Harris, 92, American politician, member of the Tennessee Senate (1966–1968) and House of Representatives (1962–1966).
- Manu Lann Huel, 77, French singer-songwriter and poet.
- Megan Kimmel, 46, American mountain runner.
- Emi Koyama, 50, Japanese-American intersex activist.
- José Ignacio López de Arriortúa, 85, Spanish automotive industry executive.
- Shirley Lord, 93, English-born American journalist.
- Jaroslav Macháček, 96, Czech academic and translator.
- Abdel Aziz Makhyoun, 83, Egyptian actor (Karnak, The Hunger, The Treasure: Truth and Imagination).
- Jan Málek, 88, Czech composer and music director.
- Zdena Mašínová Jr., 92, Czech anti-communist political prisoner.
- John Sanders, 83, American sports broadcaster (Pittsburgh Pirates, Cleveland Indians).
- Janek Sarapson, 54, Estonian actor (Kelgukoerad).
- Wim T. Schippers, 83, Dutch comedian (De Fred Haché Show, Van Oekel's Discohoek), actor and visual artist (Torentje van Drienerlo).
- Christa Schmidt, 85, German politician, MP (1990, 1994).
- Claudio Spadaro, 72, Italian actor (Tea with Mussolini, Demons, Guardami).
- Chai Vang, 57, American convicted murderer.
- Jean Ziegler, 92, Swiss sociologist and politician, MP (1981–1999), complications from Parkinson's disease.

=== 11 ===
- Bajrakitiyabha, 47, Thai princess and diplomat, complications from heart and stomach infections.
- Philip Adrian Booth, 66, British-Canadian guitarist and keyboardist ("Ulterior Motives").
- Merle Boucher, 79, American politician, member of the North Dakota House of Representatives (1991–2011).
- Brito, 86, Brazilian footballer (Vasco da Gama, Botafogo, national team), world champion (1970), pneumonia.
- Jan Brzeźny, 75, Polish Olympic cyclist (1976).
- Nigel Cabourn, 76, English fashion designer, cancer.
- Stranger Cole, 83, Jamaican singer.
- Charlie Dalin, 42, French offshore sailor, gastrointestinal cancer.
- José Durán, 74, Spanish Olympic swimmer.
- Niels Ersbøll, 100, Danish politician and diplomat, secretary-general of the Council of the European Union (1980–1994).
- David Hockney, 88, English painter (A Bigger Splash, Mr and Mrs Clark and Percy, The Blue Guitar), draughtsman and printmaker.
- Natalino Irti, 90, Italian academic and jurist.
- Kenny Jackett, 64, English-born Welsh football player (Watford, Wales national team) and manager (Millwall).
- Antony Jameson, 91, British aerospace scientist.
- Margaret Kerry, 97, American dancer and actress (Peter Pan, If You Knew Susie, Clutch Cargo), lung cancer.
- Hans Gerd Klais, 95, German organ builder.
- Christian Laurissergues, 86, French politician, deputy (1973–1988).
- Lynn Leibovitz, 67, American jurist, associate judge of the Superior Court of the District of Columbia (since 2001), glioblastoma.
- Garry Landreth, 89, American psychotherapist.
- María Ángeles Mezquíriz Irujo, 97, Spanish archaeologist and museologist, director of the Museum of Navarre, Pamplona (1957–1998).
- Janusz Michałowski, 89, Polish actor (Vabank, Sexmission, Memoirs of a Sinner).
- William C. W. Mow, 90, Chinese-born American electrical engineer and businessman, founder of Bugle Boy.
- Leif Nielsen, 84, Danish footballer (BK Frem, Greenock Morton, national team), complications from dementia.
- Gerry O'Reilly, 61, Irish Olympic middle-distance runner (1988).
- Eduardo Portela, 91, Spanish basketball coach (FC Barcelona) and executive, president of the ACB (1990–2013).
- Rüdiger Postier, 82, German judge, president of the Constitutional Court of Brandenburg (2009–2012).
- Vladimir Sapozhnikov, 81, Russian composer, traffic collision.
- Memiş Selciuc, 47, Romanian-Turkish saxophonist, heart attack.
- Leonid Shchukin, 81, Russian ice hockey player and coach.
- Chope Paljor Tsering, 77–78, Tibetan politician, MP (1986–2007).
- Lhasang Tsering, 74, Tibetan writer and political activist.
- Jane Yolen, 87, American author (The Devil's Arithmetic, Owl Moon, Commander Toad) and editor.

=== 12 ===
- Jan Achterstraat, 97, Dutch politician, senator (1980–1983).
- Taj Muhammad Afridi, 56, Pakistani politician, senator (2015–2021), traffic collision.
- Alain Blondel, 86, French art dealer and gallerist.
- Pauls Butkēvičs, 85, Latvian actor (I Remember Everything, Richard, Four White Shirts, Long Road in the Dunes).
- Yevgeny Chen, 92, Russian triple jumper.
- Alan Closter, 82, American baseball player (New York Yankees, Atlanta Braves, Washington Senators).
- Ali Musa Daqduq, 56–57, Lebanese Hezbollah commander, airstrike.
- André Doms, 94, Belgian essayist, poet, and writer.
- Bob Farmer, 79, Australian footballer (Collingwood).
- David Gamble, 70, British film editor (Shakespeare in Love, Veronica Guerin, Shopgirl). (death announced on this date)
- Ramamurthy Gamango, 75, Indian politician, Odisha MLA (1990–1995, 2000–2004), complications from diabetes.
- María Granata, 105, Argentine author, poet and politician.
- Görel Hanser, 76, Swedish record company executive (Polar Music) and talent manager (ABBA).
- Boris Isachenko, 67, Belarusian archer, Olympic silver medallist (1980).
- Norman Matloff, 77, American computer scientist.
- Frank Michael, 79, Italian-born Belgian singer, lung cancer.
- Niño Guerrero, 42, Venezuelan drug lord, leader of Tren de Aragua, assassination by airstrike.
- Joseph LaPalombara, 101, American political scientist.
- Jean-Claude Meyer, 80, French business banker.
- Lettie Oosthoek, 88, Dutch actress (Flodder, Dossier Verhulst, Flodders in America).
- Kola Oyewo, 80, Nigerian actor (The Gods Are Not to Blame, Saworoide, Koseegbe).
- Portchie, 62, South African painter and sculptor.
- Jaspal Rana, 49, Indian Olympic sport shooter (1996) and shooting coach, cardiac rupture.
- Ronnie Schell, 94, American actor (Gomer Pyle – USMC, Good Morning World, Jetsons: The Movie).
- Gene Shalit, 100, American journalist (Ladies' Home Journal), media critic (Look) and television personality (Today).
- Arlette Testyler, 93, French Holocaust survivor.
- Yaya Bauchi Tongo, 62, Nigerian politician, MP (since 2023).
- Petr Uličný, 76, Czech football player (Sparta Prague, Viktoria Plzeň) and manager (SK Sigma Olomouc).

=== 13 ===
- Zaini Abdullah, 86, Indonesian politician, governor of Aceh (2012–2017).
- Umer Chapra, 93, Pakistani-Saudi economist.
- Annick Chartreux, 83, French composer.
- Roger Cook, 83, New Zealand-born British investigative journalist and television broadcaster (The Cook Report).
- Shelly-Ann Cox, 38, Barbadian scientist and civil servant, Chief Fisheries Officer (since 2023).
- François Gall, 103, French author and film director (Amazing Train Journeys).
- Victor Gbeho, 91, Ghanaian politician, MP (2001–2006) and minister of foreign affairs (1997–2001).
- John D. Groendyke, 81, American trucking executive (Groendyke Transport).
- Ralph Haben, 84, American politician, member (1972–1982) and speaker (1980–1982) of the Florida House of Representatives.
- Roy Hattersley, Baron Hattersley, 93, British politician, MP (1964–1997) and member of the House of Lords (1997–2017).
- Hugh Heyliger, 80, Kittitian politician, deputy prime minister (1994–1995).
- Richard Hill, 81, British composer.
- Shahrzad Javaheri, 49, Iranian actress.
- Gideon Konchellah, Kenyan politician, MP (2003–2022), cardiac arrest.
- Felix Kreichman, 77, Russian economist and politician.
- Netanel Lasri, 40, Israeli military officer, cancer.
- Betty Lindberg, 101, American track and field athlete (Peachtree Road Race).
- Balázs Martos, 73, Hungarian electrical engineer.
- Rosamond McKitterick, 77, British medieval historian.
- Waldi Murad, 75, Indonesian vice admiral.
- Luisa Muraro, 85, Italian academic and philosopher.
- John O'Connell, 94, Australian footballer (Claremont, Geelong).
- Almas Ordabajev, 88, Kazakh architect.
- Hidayat Orujov, 81, Azerbaijani writer and politician, chairman of the State Committee on Affairs with Religious Associations (2006–2012).
- Dee Palmer, 88, English musician (Jethro Tull), arranger, and composer.
- Silvano Pedroso Montalvo, 73, Cuban Roman Catholic prelate, bishop of Guantánamo-Baracoa (since 2018).
- T. B. Porter, 99, American Hall of Fame bulldogger and calf roper.
- Dennis Reinbold, 65, American automobile dealer and motorsport team owner.
- Avelino Rico, 95, Spanish carom billiards player.
- Sheldon S. Sawyer, 91, American politician, member of the New Hampshire House of Representatives (2004–2006).
- Aldon Smith, 36, American football player (San Francisco 49ers, Oakland Raiders).
- Vovô Anésio, 88, Brazilian social media influencer (TikTok, Instagram, YouTube), cardiac arrest.

=== 14 ===
- Taty Almeida, 95, Argentine human rights activist.
- Malcolm Burrows, 83, British zoologist.
- Patrick Céleste, 78–79, French architect.
- Converse Chellis, 82, American politician, treasurer (2007–2011) and member of the South Carolina House of Representatives (1996–2006), cancer.
- Choi Jungwha, 70, South Korean translator.
- Chantal Deruaz, 77, French actress (Diva, The Return of Martin Guerre).
- Stephen Dobyns, 85, American poet.
- Barry Dransfield, 79, English folk singer and musician, lung infection.
- Craig Fennie, 54, American applied physicist, heart attack.
- Richard Gordon, 82, American theoretical biologist.
- Dave Greenslade, 83, English composer and keyboardist (Colosseum, Greenslade, If).
- Kay Halloran, 89, American politician, member of the Iowa House of Representatives (1997–2001) and mayor of Cedar Rapids, Iowa (2006–2009).
- Malcolm Harding, 89, English-born Canadian Anglican bishop.
- Charles A. Holloway, 90, American educator.
- Mimi Kanarek, 93, American tennis player.
- Andy Lewis, 39, American slackliner and stunt performer, BASE jumping accident.
- Alvin Libin, 95, Canadian businessman and sports executive, co-owner of Calgary Flames (since 1994).
- Beatrice Lumpkin, 107, American union organizer, activist and writer.
- Lorcan O'Herlihy, 66, Irish architect.
- Josep Maria Sans i Travé, 78, Spanish archivist and historian.
- Anne Schedeen, 77, American actress (ALF, Marcus Welby, M.D., Three's Company).
- Danny Simmons, 72, American abstract expressionist painter.
- Győző Somogyi, 83, Hungarian graphic artist and painter.
- Philippe Stern, 87, Swiss businessman, president of Patek Philippe (1977–2009).
- John Stockwell, 88, American CIA officer. (body discovered on this date)
- Max Wideman, 99, Welsh-Canadian engineer.
- Notable deaths in the Rio de Janeiro mid-air collision:
  - Lucas Frota, 27, Brazilian music producer
  - Gaspi, 23, Argentine YouTuber
  - Oliver Tree, 32, American singer-songwriter ("Life Goes On", "Miss You") and rapper
  - Lucas A. Vignale, 28, Argentine film director (The River Train) and screenwriter

=== 15 ===
- Eddie Andelman, 89, American sports radio talk-show host.
- Francesco Michele Barra, 78, Italian politician, deputy (1994–1996).
- Semahegn Belew, 58, Ethiopian singer.
- Christian Bujeau, 81, French actor (Les Visiteurs, Would I Lie to You? 2, Kaamelott).
- Kyle Calder, 47, Canadian ice hockey player (Chicago Blackhawks, Los Angeles Kings, Philadelphia Flyers).
- Etienne Cooreman, 97, Belgian politician, MP (1958–1968), senator (1971–1995).
- J. Michael Criley, 95, American medical researcher.
- Rosalind Gefre, 96, American Catholic religious sister.
- Frank J. Gargiulo, 87, American politician, member of the New Jersey General Assembly (1986–1988).
- Thomas H. Greco Jr., 89, American economist.
- Vladimir Gulyamkhaydarov, 80, Tajik-Kazakh football player (Pamir Dushanbe) and manager (Vakhsh Qurghonteppa, Sunkar).
- José Guzmán, 89, Peruvian Olympic basketball player (1964).
- Trevor Hitchen, 99, English footballer (Southport, Wigan Athletic, Oldham Athletic).
- Abdullah Ibrahim, 91, South African jazz pianist (The Jazz Epistles) and composer ("Mannenberg"), subject of A Brother with Perfect Timing.
- Ece İrtem, 35, Turkish actress (O Hayat Benim, Payitaht: Abdülhamid, Sandık Kokusu), heart attack.
- Jerry de Jong, 61, Surinamese-born Dutch footballer (PSV Eindhoven, MVV, Netherlands national team).
- I. Robert Lehman, 101, Lithuanian-born American biochemist.
- Peter Littlewood, 71, British physicist.
- Mahadevan Mahalingam, 96, Malaysian psychiatrist, heart and lung complications.
- Minkailu Mansaray, 75, Sierra Leonean politician, MP (2002–2007).
- Serhiy Osyka, 71, Ukrainian politician, deputy (2002–2012).
- Rock Perdoni, 78, American football player (Georgia Tech Yellow Jackets).
- Peter Schuster, 85, Austrian theoretical chemist.
- Semyon Skrepetsky, 45, Russian artist, opposition activist and blogger, shot.
- Luís Vaz Jorge, 82, Portuguese Olympic swimmer (1960). (death announced on this date)
- Alexander Vinidiktov, 76, Russian politician, MP (2001–2003).
- Alan Ward, 78, English cricketer (Derbyshire, Border, Leicestershire), amyloidosis.
- Bob Winograd, 76, Canadian ice hockey player (New York Golden Blades/Jersey Knights, San Diego Mariners).
- Togba Zogbélémou, Guinean politician, minister of justice (1996–2000) and MP (2014–2021).

=== 16 ===
- Gilbert Azibert, 79, French jurist.
- Claude Bardos, 86, French mathematician.
- Alfred Bayer, 93, German politician.
- Raimundo Carrero, 78, Brazilian writer, cancer.
- Daveigh Chase, 35, American actress (Lilo & Stitch, The Ring, Donnie Darko), complications from AIDS.
- The Duke of Dorchester, 83, American professional wrestler (WWWF).
- George Frost, 91, British Anglican priest, Archdeacon of Salop (1987–1998) and Lichfield (1998–2000).
- Juliet Gardiner, 83, British historian and writer.
- Romy Guevarra, 89, Filipino basketball referee.
- Christine Hamm, 83, American politician, member of the New Hampshire House of Representatives (2002–2012).
- Elizabeth Hampsten, 94, American historian, academic and author.
- Jacky Haran, 83, French racing driver (Formula Renault).
- Pat Holmes, 85, American football player (Houston Oilers, Calgary Stampeders, Kansas City Chiefs).
- Peter Kampits, 83, Austrian philosopher.
- Michael Kapovich, 63, Russian-American mathematician.
- David Kinsella, 89, New Zealand cricket umpire.
- Chatch Kuldilok, 82, Thai politician, MP (2011), stroke.
- Philippe Labarde, 86, French writer and economic journalist (Le Monde, La Tribune).
- Hervé Larrue, 90, French rugby union (national team) and rugby league player (XIII Catalan, national team).
- Lidia Litvinova, 76, Russian politician, member of the Soviet of the Union (1979–1989).
- Afsaneh Malek, 83, Iranian singer.
- Bob Miller, 85, Australian footballer (Melbourne) and politician, member of the Victorian Legislative Assembly (1979–1985).
- István Nász, 99, Hungarian bacteriologist.
- Per Ottesen, 93, Norwegian sports official, president of the Norwegian Ski Federation (1985–1987).
- Bill Poon, 81, Chinese-British chef and restaurateur, cancer.
- Bobby Prince, 81, American video game composer (Doom, Duke Nukem, Wolfenstein 3D).
- Alexander Rabinowitch, 91, American historian.
- Camillo Ruini, 95, Italian Roman Catholic cardinal, auxiliary bishop of Reggio Emilia-Guastalla (1983–1991), president of CEI (1991–2007) and cardinal vicar (1991–2008).
- Daniel Senet, 72, French weightlifter, Olympic silver medalist (1976).
- Sergey Shashurin, 69, Russian politician, MP (1995–2003).
- John J. Snow Jr., 80, American politician, member of the North Carolina Senate (2005–2011), complications from dementia.
- Robert Thurman, 84, American Buddhist writer and academic.
- Joan Viñas, 75, Spanish physician.
- Jiří Wolf, 74, Czech political prisoner and anticommunist activist, signatory of Charter 77.
- Al Worthington, 97, American baseball player (New York Giants, Boston Red Sox, Minnesota Twins).
- Harunobu Yonenaga, 60, Japanese politician, member of the House of Councillors (2007–2013).

=== 17 ===
- Manuel Benza Pflücker, 82, Peruvian politician, deputy (1985–1990).
- Teddie Beverley, 99, English singer (The Beverley Sisters).
- James Breen, 81, Irish politician, TD (2002–2007).
- Tony Brown, 93, American journalist (Tony Brown's Journal).
- Eliot D. Cohen, 84, American electrical engineer, fellow of the Institute of Electrical and Electronics Engineers.
- Marilyn Trenholme Counsell, 92, Canadian politician, lieutenant governor of New Brunswick (1997–2003), New Brunswick MLA (1987–1997), and senator (2003–2008).
- Tom Dreesen, 86, American comedian and actor (Man on the Moon, Trouble with the Curve, Spaceballs).
- Hildegard Fässler, 74, Swiss politician, MP (1997–2013).
- Carlo Ginzburg, 87, Italian historian (The Cheese and the Worms, The Night Battles, Ecstasies: Deciphering the Witches' Sabbath).
- Bobby Harrison, 95, English footballer (Carlisle United, Stockport County, Mossley). (death announced on this date)
- Hans van Hooft Sr., 84, Dutch politician, complications from colon surgery.
- Andreas Høivold, 53, Norwegian poker player, organ failure.
- Margrét Helga Jóhannsdóttir, 86, Icelandic actress.
- Toney Lee, 72, American singer, songwriter and record producer.
- Major Oak, c. 800–1000, English oak (Quercus robur). (death announced on this date)
- Lidija Manić, 70–71, Serbian model.
- Ken McCurrach, 80, Australian rugby union player (Eastwood, national team).
- Alisher Mirzonabot, 45, Tajik politician, MP (since 2022), traffic collision.
- Teresė Nekrošaitė, 64, Lithuanian Olympic javelin thrower (1992).
- Walter Parazaider, 81, American Hall of Fame woodwind musician (Chicago), complications from Alzheimer's disease.
- Éric Roy, 58, French football player (Lyon, Nice) and manager (Brest), pancreatic cancer.
- Aleksandr Samokutyaev, 56, Russian politician and cosmonaut (Soyuz TMA-21/TMA-14M), MP (since 2020).
- Prasad Sawkar, 97, Indian classical vocalist.
- Dennis Shiels, 87, Northern Irish footballer (Sheffield United, Notts County, Peterborough United). (death announced on this date)
- Barbara Stark, 88, American Olympic swimmer (1952).
- Bharat Bhushan Tiwari, Indian social activist.
- Roger Wierinckx, 98, Belgian politician, senator (1991–1995).
- Beau Williams, 76, American gospel singer, cancer.
- Ralph G. Wright, 91, American politician, member (1979–1995) and speaker (1985–1995) of the Vermont House of Representatives.

=== 18 ===
- Qamar Ahmed, 88, Pakistani cricketer (Sindh, Hyderabad) and journalist, complications from a heart attack.
- Haroon Al Rashid, 87, Bangladeshi politician, MP (1991–2008).
- Elizabeth Arnold, 66, American journalist (NPR), complications from endometrial cancer.
- Sally Brayley, 88, Canadian-American ballet dancer.
- Alex Bueno, 62, Dominican singer.
- Adolfo Battaglia, 96, Italian politician, deputy (1972–1994) and minister of industry (1987–1991).
- Daniel Castellano, 53, Venezuelan journalist, writer and researcher.
- François Englert, 93, Belgian theoretical physicist, Nobel Prize laureate (2013).
- Theoliptos Fenerlis, 69, Turkish-Greek Orthodox prelate, metropolitan of Iconium (since 2000).
- Wulf Herzogenrath, 82, German art historian and art curator.
- Ondřej Horský, 49, Czech sprint canoer.
- Bob Jolly, 95, New Zealand veterinary scientist, Fellow of the Royal Society of New Zealand (since 1985).
- Tay Keith, 29, American record producer ("Sicko Mode", "Nonstop", "Look Alive"), drug overdose.
- Bogdan Marinescu, 81, Romanian politician and doctor, MP (1992–2000).
- Thomas R. Metcalf, 92, American historian and academic.
- Al Mujahidi, 83, Bangladeshi poet.
- George Rowlett, 84, British painter.
- Ursula Schleicher, 93, German politician, MP (1972–1980), MEP (1979–2004).
- Achmad Sutjipto, 81, Indonesian admiral, chief of staff of the Navy (1999–2000).
- Mikhail Torrance, 37, American basketball player (Alabama Crimson Tide, OGM Ormanspor, Moncton Miracles).
- Sam Y. Zamrik, 93, Syrian-American engineer.

=== 19 ===
- Youssef Afifi, 99, Egyptian army officer and politician, governor of Red Sea Governorate (1981–1991) and Giza Governorate (1991–1993).
- Samīra al-Māni', 91, Iraqi writer.
- Gianfranco Baraldi, 90, Italian Olympic middle-distance runner (1956, 1960).
- Gene Bess, 91, American college basketball coach (Three Rivers Raiders).
- Brasão, 44, Brazilian footballer (Athletico Paranaense, Santa Cruz, Salgaocar), shot.
- Kent Briggs, 68, American football player and coach (Western Carolina Catamounts), prostate cancer.
- James Burrows, 85, American Hall of Fame television producer and director (Cheers, Will & Grace, Taxi), five-time Emmy winner.
- Hans Buzek, 88, Austrian footballer (First Vienna, Austria Wien, national team).
- Guy Edwards, 83, British racing driver (Formula One).
- Fatou Gaye Sarr, Senegalese politician.
- Rodolfo Giampaoli, 86, Italian politician, president of Marche (1990–1993).
- William Isaac, 82, American banker, FDIC chairman (1981–1985).
- Trond Johansen, 102, Norwegian intelligence officer (NIS).
- Mona Khalil, 76, Lebanese conservationist and environmentalist, injuries from an airstrike.
- Min Khaike Soe San, 53, Burmese writer and film director.
- Alain MacMoy, 99, French actor (Je t'aime, je t'aime).
- Hershel Parker, 90, American literary historian and scholar (Herman Melville).
- Lex Pritchard, 72, Australian footballer (Collingwood).
- Igor Protti, 58, Italian footballer (Lazio, Napoli, Livorno), colon cancer.
- John Ronaldson, 79, Australian footballer (Richmond), cancer.
- Savabeel, 24, Australian Hall of Fame Thoroughbred racehorse and sire, fractured shoulder.
- Mark Singer, 75, American journalist (The New Yorker), complications from salivary gland cancer.
- Kirsti Sparboe, 79, Norwegian singer and actress.
- Sir Emile Straker, 90, Barbadian singer (The Merrymen), complications from dementia.
- Sándor Tímár, 95, Hungarian choreographer and dancer.
- Haruhiro Yamashita, 87, Japanese gymnast, double Olympic champion (1964).

=== 20 ===
- Geneviève Aubry, 98, Swiss politician, MP (1979–1995).
- Mireille Bastin, 83, Belgian painter.
- Michael Byrne, 86, British actor (Indiana Jones and the Last Crusade, Gangs of New York, Braveheart).
- Slavenka Drakulić, 76, Croatian journalist, novelist (Café Europa, They Would Never Hurt a Fly) and essayist.
- Geraldene Felton, 100, American academic.
- Frank J. Guarini, 101, American politician, member of the U.S. House of Representatives (1979–1993).
- Eliazar Guzmán, 94, Chilean Olympic sport shooter.
- Audu Sule Katagum, 69, Nigerian politician.
- Ivan Khitskov, 89, Russian economist.
- P. Narayana Kurup, 91, Indian poet and literary critic.
- Yves Lacoste, 96, French geographer and geopolitician.
- Evalyn Merrick, 72, American politician, member of the New Hampshire House of Representatives (2006–2012), pancreatic cancer.
- Jim Mitchell, 77, American football player (Detroit Lions).
- Akihiro Miwa, 91, Japanese singer and actor (Princess Mononoke, Howl's Moving Castle, Black Rose Mansion).
- Alan Murray, 76, English football player (Doncaster Rovers) and manager (Hartlepool United, Darlington).
- Julia Nyakó, 63, Hungarian actress (Season of Monsters, On Body and Soul).
- Sami al-Oraydi, 52–53, Jordanian Islamic militant, leader of Hurras al-Din (2018–2025), airstrike.
- David W. Rohde, 82, American political scientist.
- Abdus Sadeque, 79, Bangladeshi field hockey player (Azad SC, Pakistan national team, national team) and footballer.
- Olga Soffer, 83, Serbian-born American anthropologist.
- Norman Tolk, 88, American physicist.
- Habib Touhami, 78, Tunisian politician.
- Nirajoy Tripura, 86, Indian politician, Tripura MLA (2008–2013).
- Ahmad Washah, 25, Palestinian cameraman (Al Jazeera), airstrike.

=== 21 ===
- Yaacov Agam, 98, Israeli sculptor and experimental artist.
- Selima Ahmad, 65, Bangladeshi politician, MP (2019–2024), cancer.
- Ange Armato, 96, American baseball player (Rockford Peaches, Kalamazoo Lassies).
- Jim Battle, 88, American football player (Edmonton Eskimos, Minnesota Vikings).
- George Blay, 45, Ghanaian footballer (Standard Liège, Dinamo București, national team).
- Ilana Cohen, 82, Israeli politician, MK (2003–2006).
- Remigio Cortés, 94, Chilean horse groomer and rodeo rider.
- Ab DeMarco Jr., 77, American-born Canadian ice hockey player (New York Rangers, Pittsburgh Penguins, Los Angeles Kings).
- Noël Deschamps, 83, French singer.
- Iñaki Dorronsoro, 78, Spanish industrial engineer.
- Krzysztof Dowgiałło, 87, Polish politician, MP (1989–1991).
- Maura L. Gillison, 61, American oncologist and molecular epidemiologist, small bowel cancer.
- Víctor Guaglianone, 89, Uruguayan footballer (Lazio, Montevideo Wanderers, national team).
- Francisco Guterres, 71, East Timorese politician, president (2017–2022) and president of the national parliament (2002–2007).
- Louise Holcombe, 72, American Olympic slalom canoeist (1972).
- Mosharraf Hossain, 78, Bangladeshi politician, MP (1988–1990).
- S. Jeyanandamoorthy, 60, Sri Lankan politician, MP (2004–2010).
- Naeem Ahmed Kharal, 69, Pakistani politician, Sindh MPA (2013–2018).
- Rajendra Kharel, 80, Nepali politician, MP (1999–2002, 2007–2008), complications from chronic obstructive pulmonary disease.
- Pavlos Kourtidis, 53, Greek actor.
- Abdul Ahad Momand, 67, Afghan-German astronaut (Mir EP-3), cancer.
- Karen S. Montgomery, 90, American politician.
- Jeff Olson, 77, American visual effects artist (Star Wars: Episode I – The Phantom Menace, Star Trek, Who Framed Roger Rabbit).
- Vittorio Parisi, 89, Italian politician, senator (1992–1994).
- Edward Wiley Ray, 99, American record producer and songwriter.
- Oleksandr Riabeka, 66, Ukrainian politician, MP (2006–2012).
- András Simor, 87, Hungarian poet.
- Ramiro Valdés Menéndez, 94, Cuban revolutionary and politician, vice president of the Council of State (2009–2019), and minister of the interior (1961–1968, 1979–1985).
- Judith Valles, 93, American educator and politician.
- Gene Wiley, 88, American basketball player (Los Angeles Lakers, Oakland Oaks, Dallas Chaparrals).

=== 22 ===
- Joby Baker, 92, Canadian actor (Gidget, Good Morning World, Girl Happy).
- Denisa Baránková, 24, Slovak Olympic archer (2020, 2024), traffic collision.
- Wolfgang Behrendt, 90, German bantamweight boxer, Olympic champion (1956).
- Jean-Claude Biojout, 86–87, French basketball player (CSP Limoges).
- Joaquim Casado, Spanish voice actor.
- Paul Clancy, 49, Irish Gaelic football player (Moycullen, Galway GAA) and manager (Garrycastle GAA).
- Clive Davis, 94, American Hall of Fame music executive (Columbia Records) and record producer, founder of Arista Records and J Records, four-time Grammy winner.
- Joseph F. Fraumeni Jr., 93, American medical researcher.
- Thomas Frawley, 77, Northern Irish health executive.
- Joshua Gil, 50, American restaurateur, colorectal cancer.
- Joanne Glasser, 75, American academic administrator, president of Eastern Kentucky University (2001–2007) and Bradley University (2007–2015).
- Alan Greenspan, 100, American economist, chair of the Federal Reserve (1987–2006), complications from Parkinson's disease.
- Saïd Haddou, 43, French road bicycle racer, traffic collision.
- Villy Haugen, 81, Norwegian speed skater, Olympic bronze medalist (1964).
- Sir Edwin Jowitt, 96, British judge.
- Eddie Knox, 89, American politician, mayor of Charlotte, North Carolina (1979–1983) and member of the North Carolina Senate (1971–1975).
- Viktor Kudriavtsev, 88, Russian figure skating coach and choreographer.
- János Németh, 92, Hungarian sculptor.
- Mikhail Nozhkin, 89, Russian actor (The Detached Mission, The Secret Agent's Blunder, Liberation), poet, and musician.
- Edin Numankadić, 78, Bosnian visual artist.
- Guesch Patti, 80, French singer ("Étienne").
- Ron Sanford, 80, American basketball player (Dallas Chaparrals).
- Sir Jack Stewart-Clark, 96, British politician and businessman, MEP (1979–1999).
- Byron D. Tapley, 93, American geodesist.
- Barbora Tlučhořová, 37, Czech radio presenter, cancer.
- Temur Ugulava, 56, Georgian hospitality executive.
- Dorothy Wilken, 90, American politician, mayor of Boca Raton, Florida (1976–1977).
- Herbie Williams, 85, Welsh footballer (Swansea City, national team).
- Martha Zoller, 66, American political commentator and radio host, complications from a heart attack.

=== 23 ===
- Azar Azima, 98, Iranian singer.
- Bob Blair, 94, New Zealand cricketer (Wellington, national team).
- José Bonnet, 84, Spanish writer, politician and astronomer, co-founder of the Cantonal Party.
- Cristiana Brandolini d'Adda, 99, Italian aristocrat.
- Nina Brashkina, 87, Russian politician, member of the Supreme Soviet of the Russian SFSR (1971–1980).
- Heinz Erbstößer, 86, German Olympic sprinter (1964, 1968).
- Boris Grițunic, 78, Moldovan architect.
- Davyd Harries, 89, Welsh actor (Anna Karenina, A.D., Emmerdale).
- Maurice-Ruben Hayoun, 75, French philosopher.
- Valmai Holt, 90, British military historian.
- Orest Meleschuk, 86, Canadian curler, world champion (1972).
- Erie Mills, 73, American operatic soprano.
- Marcelo Miranda Soares, 87, Brazilian politician, mayor of Campo Grande (1977–1979) and governor of Mato Grosso do Sul (1979–1980, 1987–1991), multiple organ failure complicated by pneumonia.
- Charlie Nelson, 72, French actor (Diplomacy, A Difficult Year, The Marching Band).
- Zsanett Németh, 32, Hungarian Olympic wrestler (2016), suicide by jumping.
- Józef Nowicki, 81, Polish politician, MP (1993–2005).
- John P. Reardon, 88, American academic administrator, athletic director of Harvard University (1978–1990).
- Roger W. Sandler, 92, American army general, chief of the U.S. Army Reserve (1991–1994).
- Franco Seminara, 68, Belgian politician, senator (2007, 2009–2010), MP (2010–2014).
- François Taillandier, 71, French writer and journalist.
- Ingo Weiß, 89, German politician, member of the Landtag of Bavaria (1970–1978).
- Jani Wickholm, 48, Finnish singer.
- Steve Zabel, 78, American football player (Philadelphia Eagles, New England Patriots, Baltimore Colts).

=== 24 ===
- Beata Andrejczuk-Dudzińska, 38, Polish chess player, aortic dissection.
- Emilio Bataclan, 85, Filipino Roman Catholic prelate, auxiliary bishop of Cebu (1990–1995, 2004–2015) and bishop of Iligan (1995–2004), heart attack.
- Ann Blyth, 98, American actress (Mildred Pierce, Brute Force, The Great Caruso).
- Mary-Dell Chilton, 87, American biochemist.
- David Clayton-Thomas, 84, British-Canadian Hall of Fame singer (Blood, Sweat & Tears) and songwriter ("Spinning Wheel"), Grammy winner (1970).
- Takis Gonias, 54, Greek footballer (Levadiakos, Olympiacos, Iraklis, national team).
- Sir Roy Goode, 93, English lawyer, heart failure.
- Pyotr Gorovoy, 89, Russian botanist.
- Oswald Harding, 90, Jamaican politician, president of the Senate (1980–1984, 2007–2011) and attorney general (1986–1989).
- Néstor Herrera Heredia, 92, Ecuadorian Roman Catholic prelate, bishop of Machala (1982–2010).
- Jeong Gi-seung, 97, South Korean judge, justice of the supreme court (1985–1988).
- Chris Langham, 77, English actor (The Thick of It, Help), television writer (The Muppet Show) and sex offender, Emmy winner (1981), pancreatic cancer.
- Guillermo Lousteau Heguy, 91, Argentine lawyer.
- Om Malik, 59, Indian-American web and technology writer, founder of Gigaom.
- Teena McQueen, Australian politician.
- Tullio Možina, 91, Italian-born Slovenian guitarist and singer.
- Oshim Ottawa, 29, Canadian actor (Atikamekw Suns) and musician.
- Élisabeth Pochon, 71, French politician, deputy (2012–2017).
- Mike Stamm, 73, American swimmer, Olympic champion (1972).
- Lynn Stiles, 85, American football coach.
- Katsuya Uechi, 67, Japanese-American chef and restaurateur.
- Caroline S. Wagner, 71, American academic and author, pancreatic cancer.
- Jeremy Walsh, 96, English bishop.
- Harold Wheeler, 82, American orchestrator and composer.
- Notable victims of the Venezuela earthquakes:
  - Yimvert Berroterán, 18, Venezuelan footballer (Universidad Central de Venezuela)
  - Yorgelis Delgado, 43, Venezuelan actress
  - Milagros Eulate, 63, Venezuelan politician, deputy (since 2016)
  - Gabriela Fleritt, 55, Venezuelan actress, radio announcer, and comedian (Bienvenidos)
  - Isabel Jara, 69, Spanish-Venezuelan civil servant, delegate of the Government of the Canary Islands (since 2023)
  - María Clemencia López, 85–86, Venezuelan diplomat
  - Richard Peñalver, 62, Venezuelan politician (Llaguno Overpass events)
  - Onai Quiñonez, 32, Venezuelan painter and cellist
  - Willner Rivas, 31, Venezuelan volleyball player

=== 25 ===
- Gail Bowen, 83, Canadian playwright and writer (Joanne Kilbourn), cancer.
- Gérard Brémond, 88, French resort developer (Pierre & Vacances).
- Les Brennan, 95, Australian rugby league player (South Sydney Rabbitohs).
- Daniel Castellani, 65, Argentine volleyball player, Olympic bronze medallist (1988).
- Victoria Cruz, 79, Puerto Rican LGBTQ rights activist, liver cancer.
- Charlie Davis, 82, West Indian cricketer (Trinidad and Tobago, West Indies).
- Philip Doyle, 61, Irish rugby union coach (women's national team, Blackrock College).
- Carl Ekdahl, 90, American electrical engineer, fellow of the Institute of Electrical and Electronics Engineers.
- Eriamel, 73, French comic book writer.
- Derrell Griffith, 82, American baseball player (Los Angeles Dodgers).
- Mats Grotenbreg, 28, Dutch footballer (USV Hercules, Jong Vitesse, VV DOVO), boat collision.
- Timo Hantunen, 76, Finnish rally co-driver.
- Donald William Krummel, 96, American music bibliographer.
- Stephen Lowe, 82, British Anglican prelate, Bishop of Hulme (1999–2009).
- Jackie MacDonald, 93, Canadian Olympic shot putter and discus thrower (1956).
- Salomó Marquès, 84, Spanish academic and writer.
- Ira C. Owens, 89, American army lieutenant general.
- Vyacheslav Pozgalyov, 79, Russian politician, governor of Vologda Oblast (1996–2011) and deputy (2011–2016).
- Nicholas Rossi, 38, American convicted sex offender and fugitive.
- B. J. Sams, 91, American news anchor.
- Francis Clifford Smith, 101, American convicted murderer.
- Dusty Spencer, 74, American convicted murderer, execution by lethal injection.
- Sir Neville Trotter, 94, British politician, MP (1974–1997).
- Bill Valentine, 88, American architect.
- Wan Shaofen, 95, Chinese politician, party secretary of Jiangxi (1985–1988).
- Frank A. Welch, 65, American maritime officer, master chief petty officer of the Coast Guard (2002–2006).
- Sławomir Żukowski, 67, Polish actor and theatre director.

=== 26 ===
- Saman Almeida, 60, Sri Lankan actor (Aladinge Waldin, Patibhana) and comedian.
- Kurt Ard, 100, Danish illustrator, painter and graphic artist. (death announced on this date)
- Annie Baglin, 87, French astrophysicist.
- Likulia Bolongo, 86, Congolese politician, prime minister of Zaire (1997).
- David B. Danbom, 79, American historian and author.
- Joe Doering, 44, American professional wrestler (TNA, AJPW), brain tumor.
- Stephen Fender, 89, American-born British academic and writer.
- Tom Glass, 77, Canadian actor, chuckwagon racer and stuntman (Shanghai Noon, The 6th Day, The Long Kiss Goodnight), stroke.
- Christopher Robert Hallpike, 88, British-born Canadian anthropologist.
- David Hencke, 79, British investigative journalist (The Guardian), liver cancer.
- Tamás Horváth, 75, Hungarian chess International Master. (death announced on this date)
- Kadir İnanır, 77, Turkish actor (Target, A Sip of Love, Yarın Ağlayacağım), complications from pneumonia.
- Sergei Ivanov, 73, Russian politician, chief of staff (2011–2016), deputy prime minister (2007–2011), and minister of defence (2001–2007), pneumonia.
- Adrian Jack, 83, British composer. (death announced on this date)
- Nail Kutlugildin, 79, Russian politician, member of the State Assembly of the Republic of Bashkortostan (1999–2013).
- Günter Lenz, 87, German jazz bassist and composer.
- Tom Ligon, 85, American actor (Paint Your Wagon, The Young and the Restless, Oz).
- Věra Linhartová, 88, Czech writer and art historian.
- Martha Lillard, 78, American polio survivor, last known person reliant on an iron lung, complications from COVID-19.
- Rosetta Miller-Perry, 91, American journalist, founder of the Tennessee Tribune.
- Nurlan Motuev, 56, Kyrgyz politician.
- Daniel Oliver, 87, American executive editor.
- Ernestina Pais, 54, Argentine journalist and television presenter, traffic collision.
- John T. Pawlikowski, 85, American Roman Catholic priest and theologian.
- Tapani Peltola, 66, Finnish Olympic bowler (1988).
- Mihály Pénzes, 75, Hungarian footballer (Győri ETO, national team).
- Huno Rätsep, 98, Estonian linguist, member of the Estonian Academy of Sciences and chairman of the Mother Tongue Society (1982–1989).
- Manfred Ritschel, 80, German footballer (Kickers Offenbach, SpVgg Fürth, West Germany national team).
- Kevin Roberts, 87, Australian footballer (St Kilda).
- Alain Roux, 91, French historian and sinologist.
- Bahij Tabbara, 96, Lebanese jurist and politician, minister of economy (1973) and justice (1992–1998, 2003–2004). (death announced on this date)
- Tsuneko Taniuchi, 79, Japanese-French artist.
- Wang Luolin, 88, Chinese politician and academic administrator.
- Leslie Woodhead, 88, British documentary filmmaker.
- Mickey York, 78, American racing driver.

=== 27 ===
- David Andrews, 91, Irish politician, TD (1965–2002), minister for foreign affairs (1992–1993, 1997–2000) and twice for defence.
- K. Bhagyaraj, 73, Indian film director (Andha 7 Naatkal, Mundhanai Mudichu) and actor (Thupparivaalan), heart attack.
- Alexei Bueno, 63, Brazilian poet, complications from cancer.
- Anna Dawson, 88, British actress (Dixon of Dock Green, The Benny Hill Show, Keeping Up Appearances).
- David S. Doty, 96, American jurist, judge of the U.S. District Court for Minnesota (since 1987).
- Gilbert Emptaz, 76, French Olympic sport shooter (1972, 1976).
- Valery Fabrikant, 86, Belarusian-born Canadian academic and convicted mass murderer (Concordia University massacre).
- Khadijah Farrakhan, 90, American political activist (Nation of Islam).
- Thomas Fey, 65, German orchestral conductor, complications from a brain injury.
- C. Robin Ganellin, 92, British medicinal chemist.
- Peter Heard, 87, British football executive (Colchester United F.C.)
- Jean-Paul Jauffret, 95, French oenologist, tennis player and businessman.
- Ray Keener, 70, American academic and politician, member of the West Virginia House of Delegates (2000–2002).
- Konstantin Khudyakov, 81, Russian artist, lung cancer.
- Eeva Kilpi, 98, Finnish writer.
- Simon L. Leis Jr., 92, American prosecuting attorney and sheriff, complications from pneumonia and cancer.
- Ian Kennedy Martin, 90, British television writer and screenwriter (The Sweeney, The Capone Investment, Mitchell).
- Billy G. Mills, 96, American politician, member of the Los Angeles City Council (1963–1974).
- Daniel Morse, 81–82, American Anglican prelate, bishop of the Central States (2008–2019).
- Rob Scheller, 98, Dutch art historian.
- Werner Stauff, 66, German Olympic road racing cyclist (1984).
- Waldo Urrego, 80, Colombian actor (Café con aroma de mujer, The Great Heist, Stolen Away).
- Margaret Britton Vaughn, 87, American poet.
- Siegfried Verbeke, 85, Belgian Holocaust denier.
- Dramane Yaméogo, Burkinabe politician, minister of justice (2012–2014).

=== 28 ===
- Shoaib Ahmed, 62, Indian software engineer.
- Sonia Antinori, 63, Italian playwright.
- Marcello Aravena, 50, Canadian outlaw biker and convicted murderer.
- Wilford Lloyd Baumes, 86, American screenwriter and television producer (The Love Boat, Wonder Woman).
- Eddie Bevans, 41, Irish hurler (Offaly), complications from amyotrophic lateral sclerosis.
- Alla Chernova, 82, Russian actress (Don't Forget... Lugovaya Station, Secret of the Blackbirds).
- Piotr Chmielowski, 61, Polish politician, deputy (2011–2015).
- Artur Dmitriev, 58, Russian figure skater, Olympic champion (1992, 1998), complications from heart surgery.
- Mignon Dunn, 98, American mezzo-soprano (Metropolitan Opera) and voice teacher (Manhattan School of Music).
- Teruki Gotō, 43, Japanese musician and far-right perennial candidate.
- Vlado Janevski, 65, Macedonian singer.
- Ken Lewis, 97, Welsh cricketer (Glamorgan).
- Victor H. Mair, 83, American sinologist (The Columbia History of Chinese Literature), urinary tract cancer.
- Bill McCowen, 89, British Olympic bobsledder (1964).
- Gamal Mohamed, 27, Egyptian Olympic wrestler (2024).
- Wolfgang Paul, 86, German footballer (Borussia Dortmund, West Germany national team).
- David E. Potter, 82, South African microcomputer manufacturer, founder and chairman of Psion.
- Justin Richards, 64, British writer (Doctor Who, The Invisible Detective).
- Tom Siddon, 84, Canadian politician, MP (1978–1993).
- Robert Słaboń, 72, Polish motorcycle speedway rider (Eastbourne Eagles, national team).
- Gagik Stamboltsyan, 69, Armenian surgeon and politician, minister of health (1997–1998).
- Egil Ulateig, 80, Norwegian writer.
- Sevgül Uludağ, 67, Turkish Cypriot journalist and activist.
- Marie Viková, 90, Czech actress.
- Hannelore Zober, 79, German handball player (East Germany national team), Olympic silver medalist (1976) and three-time world champion.

=== 29 ===
- Saleem Al-Ashqar, 32, Palestinian footballer, shot.
- Careca, 82, Brazilian footballer (Atlético Mineiro, national team), lung cancer.
- Cat Frazier, 35, American graphic designer and blogger.
- Luis Gini, 90, Paraguayan footballer (Club Olimpia, The Strongest, national team).
- Tan Ling Houw, 95, Indonesian footballer (Persija Jakarta, national team).
- Gennady Ireykin, 85, Russian aviation navigator.
- Dame Penelope Keith, 86, English actress (The Good Life, To the Manor Born, Executive Stress), cancer.
- Phyllis Kinney, 103, American singer (Carl Rosa Opera Company) and author.
- Arda Küçükyetim, 20, Turkish convicted attempted murderer (2024 Eskişehir stabbing), suicide.
- Vicente Lage, 93, Brazilian football manager (Atlético Mineiro, Cruzeiro, Uberlândia).
- Madan Mohan Lakhera, 88, Indian army lieutenant general, governor of Mizoram (2006–2011), lieutenant governor of Andaman and Nicobar Islands (2006) and Puducherry (2004–2006).
- Ervin László, 94, Hungarian-American philosopher.
- Michael Luce, 84, American Olympic bobsledder (1968).
- Bob Maaskant, 88, Dutch football manager (SV SVV).
- Gregor McLennan, 74, British sociologist. (body discovered on this date)
- Neil McNeill, 94, Australian footballer (South Melbourne).
- Antoinette Miggiani, 88, Maltese operatic soprano.
- Les Mills, 91, New Zealand Hall of Fame Olympic shot putter and discus thrower (1960–1972), Hall of Fame businessman, and politician, mayor of Auckland City (1990–1998).
- Mustafa Monwar, 90, Bangladeshi painter and puppeteer, pneumonia complicated by prostate cancer.
- Salman Nadwi, 72, Indian Islamic scholar.
- Michael Oatley, 90, British intelligence officer.
- Karel Pexidr, 96, Czech writer, philosopher and classical composer.
- Daniel Poudrier, 62, Canadian ice hockey player (Quebec Nordiques).
- Josef Přibyl, 78, Czech chess player.
- Joël Raguénès, 84, French novelist.
- Ron Raper, 80, Australian rugby league player (Canterbury Bankstown Bulldogs, Redcliffe Dolphins) and coach (Wests Panthers).
- Prezell Robinson, 105, American sociologist.
- Humphrey Smith, 81, British brewer, chairman of Samuel Smith Old Brewery (since 1980).

=== 30 ===
- Aitana Alberti León, 84, Argentine-Cuban writer.
- Yves-Marie Bercé, 89, French historian.
- Donald Frederick Blaxell, 92, Australian botanist.
- Augusto Borderas, 94, Spanish politician, member of the Basque Parliament (1987–1989) and senator (1989–1996).
- Roger Cador, 74, American Hall of Fame college baseball coach (Southern Jaguars), brain cancer.
- Karen Clark, 80, American politician, member of the Minnesota House of Representatives (1981–2019).
- Ethel Cochrane, 88, Canadian politician, senator (1986–2012).
- Elio Cotena, 80, Italian Olympic boxer (1968).
- Joaquín Gimeno Lahoz, 77, Spanish Roman Catholic prelate, bishop of Comodoro Rivadavia (2010–2023).
- Irén Henrik, 89, Hungarian cinematographer (Mattie the Goose-boy).
- Bobby Irvine, 84, Northern Irish footballer (Linfield, Stoke City, national team).
- Penne Percy Korth, 83, American diplomat, ambassador to Mauritius (1989–1992).
- P. A. Madhavan, 79, Indian politician, Kerala MLA (2011–2016), complications from a traffic collision.
- Radu Mărginean, 43, Romanian footballer (UTA Arad, CFR Cluj, Gloria Bistrița), fall.
- Vijaya Mehta, 91, Indian actress (Party) and director (Rao Saheb, Pestonjee).
- Daniel Melingo, 68, Argentine musician (Los Twist, Los Abuelos de la Nada).
- Mahmoud Mollaghasemi, 97, Iranian freestyle wrestler, Olympic bronze medallist (1952).
- Mihalis Mosios, 79, Greek actor.
- Bill Pattinson, 81, English rugby league player (Workington Town, Warrington, Swinton).
- Brian Potter, 87, British-born American songwriter ("Ain't No Woman (Like the One I've Got)", "It Only Takes a Minute") and record producer (Rhinestone Cowboy).
- Puviarasu, 96, Indian poet.
- Angela Rosengart, 94, Swiss art dealer, collector and philanthropist.
- Joe Smith, 91, American politician, member of the Oregon House of Representatives (2004).
- Danny Webb, 73, American camera operator (American Idol, America's Got Talent, Dinner for Five), seven-time Emmy winner.
- Victor Willis, 74, American singer (Village People) and songwriter ("Y.M.C.A.", "In the Navy"), liver cancer.
