= Ekdahl =

Ekdahl is a surname of Swedish origin. Notable people with the surname include:

- Carl Ekdahl, American electrical engineer
- Jonas Ekdahl, Swedish born drummer of metal band Evergrey
- Lennart Ekdahl (1912–2005), Swedish sailor who competed in the 1936 Summer Olympics
- Lisa Ekdahl (born 1971), Swedish singer-songwriter
- Nils Johan Ekdahl (1799–1870), Swedish theologian, political writer and cultural historian
