= Joan Viñas =

Spanish physician (1950–2026)

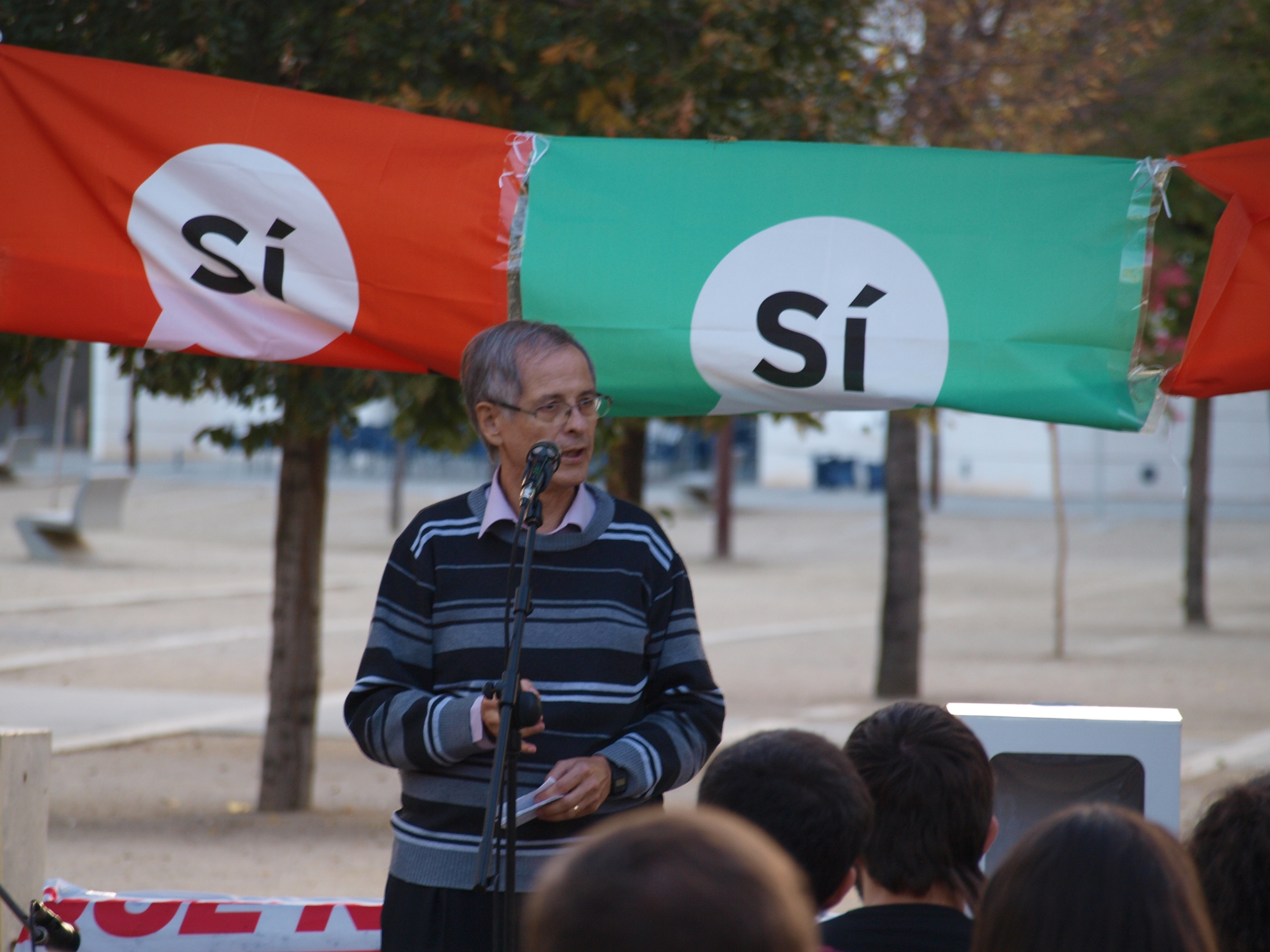
- Viñas in 2017
- Born: Joan Viñas i Salas; 11 December 1950; Mataró, Spain
- Died: 16 June 2026 (aged 75); Lleida, Spain
- Education: University of Barcelona; Biomedical Research Institute of Lleida
- Occupation: Physician

Joan Viñas i Salas (11 December 1950 – 16 June 2026) was a Spanish physician. A member of the Royal Academy of Medicine of Catalonia, he was a recipient of the Creu de Sant Jordi (2018).

Viñas died in Lleida on 16 June 2026, at the age of 75.
