= Maurice-Ruben Hayoun =

French philosopher (1950–2026)

Maurice-Ruben Hayoun (21 September 1950 – 23 June 2026) was a French philosopher. He was a recipient of the Legion of Honour (2007).

Hayoun died on 23 June 2026, at the age of 75.

== Books ==
- La Philosophie et la théologie de Moïse de Narbonne (1300-1362), Tübingen, Mohr, 1989.
- Moshé Narboni, Tubingen, Mohr, 1986.
- L'Exégèse philosophique dans le judaïsme médiéval, Tubingen, Mohr, 1993
- Eliya Delmédigo (1460-1493). L'examen de la religion. Paris, Cerf, 150 pages
- Les Mémoires de Jacob Emden ou l'anti-Sabbataï Zewi, Traduit de l'hébreu, Cerf, 1992
- Gershom Scholem. Le nom et les symboles de Dieu dans la mystique juive. Paris, Cerf, 1983, 1989. (textes rassemblés, traduits de l'allemand avec une introduction)
- Gershom Scholem. La kabbale, les thèmes fondamentaux, Paris, Cerf, 1985. (Traduction de l'allemand avec une introduction)
- Georg M. Langer, L'érotique de la kabbale, Solin/ Actes Sud, 1990.
- Gershom Scholem. De la création du monde jusqu'à Varsovie, Paris, Cerf, 1990. (textes édités, traduits de l'allemand avec une introduction)
- Salomon Maïmon. Histoire de ma vie. Paris, Berg international,1984.
- Samson-Raphaël Hirsch. Les dix-neuf épîtres sur le judaïsme Paris, Cerf,1987.
- Franz Rosenzweig. Le livret de l'entendement sain et malsain Paris, Cerf,1988.
- Theodor Lessing. La haine de soi : le refus d'être juif, Paris, Berg, 1991. Réédition 2002
- Heinrich Grätz (1817-1892). La construction de l'Histoire juive, suivi de Gnosticisme et judaïsme, Cerf, Paris, janvier 1992.
- Léo Baeck (1873-1956). L'Essence du judaïsme. PUF, 1993.
- Hermann Cohen (1843-1918). L'éthique du judaïsme. Cerf, 1994.
- Les Lumières de Cordoue à Berlin : une histoire intellectuelle du judaïsme, Pocket, Agora, 2007/8.
- Salomon Maïmon. Commentateur du Guide des égarés de Moïse Maïmonide, Le Cerf, 1998.
- Le Zohar, aux origines de la mystique juive, éd. Noêsis, 1999, réédité chez Pocket en 2005.
- Gershom Scholem : un Juif allemand à Jérusalem. PUF, Paris, 2002.
- Léo Baeck. Les Evangiles, une source juive, traduit de l’allemand avec une introduction, Bayard, 2001
- Le judaïsme (coll. 128 pages). (Armand Colin) 2003
- La philosophie juive. Armand Colin, Collection U, 2004.
- Geschichte der jüdischen Philosophie. Wissenschaftliche Buchgesellschaft, Darmstadt, 2004,
- Maïmonide, Paris, éd. Entrelacs, Collection Sagesses éternelles. 2005.
- Écoute, Israël, Écoute, France – Sachons préserver notre héritage commun, Armand Colin, 2005.
- Léo Baeck. Ce peuple. L’existence juive. (Berlin, 1956 ; Gütersloh, G.S. 1996), traduction française avec introduction, postface et bibliographie. 2007.
- Petite histoire de la philosophie juive. Paris, Ellipses, 2008.
- Renan. la Bible et les juifs. Paris, Arléa, 2008.
- Maimonide. Paris, Ellipses, 2009.
- Abraham. Un patriarche dans l'histoire. Paris, Ellipses, 2009.
- La Kabbale. Préface de Jacques Attali, Paris, Ellipses, 2011
