= Vovô Anésio =

Brazilian social media influencer (1937–2026)

- Born: Anezio Fiori; 22 September 1937
- Died: 13 June 2026 (aged 88); Araraquara, São Paulo, Brazil
- Occupation: Social media influencer
- Spouse: Dona Elza

Instagram information
- Page: ovovodobrasil
- Followers: 771 thousand

TikTok information
- Page: Caio do vovô Anesio
- Years active: 2023–2026
- Followers: 6.8 million

YouTube information
- Channel: Short's do vovô Anesio
- Years active: 2022–2026
- Subscribers: 963 thousand
- Views: 710 million
- Last updated: 13 June 2026

Anezio Fiori (22 September 1937 – 13 June 2026), known professionally as Vovô Anésio, (Note: Grandpa Anésio is the English translation of Vovô Anésio) was a Brazilian social media influencer. Originally a bricklayer, he was best known for appearing in numerous humorous videos along with his grandson Caio Fiori on YouTube, Instagram and TikTok. He was dubbed as the "Grandpa of Brazil" by O Globo.

In 2024, Fiori lived in Rincão. He died from a cardiac arrest in Araraquara, São Paulo, on 13 June 2026, at the age of 88.
