= Georgy Kleiner =

Russian economist (1946–2026)

- Георгий Клейнер
- Born: 8 May 1946; Ivanovo, Russian SFSR, Soviet Union
- Died: 4 June 2026 (aged 80)
- Occupation: Economist

Georgy Borisovich Kleiner (Russian: Георгий Борисович Клейнер; 8 May 1946 – 4 June 2026) was a Russian economist. A member of the Russian Academy of Sciences and the Russian Academy of Natural Sciences, he was a recipient of the Medal of the Order "For Merit to the Fatherland" (2014).

Kleiner died on 4 June 2026, at the age of 80.
