= Seham Galal =

Egyptian actress (1972–2026)

- سهام جلال
- Born: Seham Saeed Galal; 7 January 1972; Cairo, Egypt
- Died: 2 June 2026 (aged 54)
- Occupation: Actress
- Years active: 1998–2018

Seham Galal (7 January 1972 – 2 June 2026) was an Egyptian actress. She began her artistic career in 1998 and remained active in the entertainment industry until 2018, when she stepped away from acting due to professional conflicts with producers.

== Early life and career ==
Galal began her professional life working in television commercials. She transitioned into acting through a minor role in the blockbusting comedy film Sa'edi fyl Gam'ah el Amrekeyyah (1998). Following this debut, prominent actor Mahmoud Abdel Aziz invited her to co-star with him in the film El Nems (2000), which marked her breakthrough into mainstream cinema.

She later went on to perform extensively in television dramas, gaining wide recognition for her appearances in popular series such as Ayna Qalbi ("Where is My Heart?") and Hadd el Sekkeen ("Edge of the Knife"). She also secured her first leading protagonist role in the film Al Ged'an.

== Death ==
Galal died on 2 June 2026, at the age of 54. Her death followed a sudden medical emergency that required doctors to perform urgent surgery to address a vascular occlusion. Following the operation, she was admitted to the intensive care unit, where her health deteriorated, and she entered a complete coma before dying.

== Filmography ==
=== Television ===
- Awwalem Khafeya (2018)
- Arayes Khashab (2017)
- Tilka al-Layla (2011)
- Hanem Bent Basha (2009)
- Banat fil-Thalatheen (2008)
- Oyoun wa Ramad (2007)
- Toto wa Bejama (2006)
- Mowaten Bedargat Wazir (2006)
- Aslehat Damar Shamel (2006)
- Lel Tharwa Hesabat Okhra (2005)
- Fajr Layla Sayf (2004)
- Hadd el Sekkeen (2003)
- Ghadr wa Kibriya (2003)
- Egry.. Egry (2002)
- Ayna Qalbi (2002)
- Ragol Fee Zaman Al-Awlama (Part 1) (2002)
- Alo.. Rabe' Marra (2002)
- Awraq Misriya (Part 2) (2002)
- Enty Meen Ya Helwa (2000)
- Al-Fagala (2000)
- Al-Wishah Al-Abiad (2000)
- Salma Ya Salama (2000)
- Robama Naltaqy (1999)
- Hob Taht Al-Herasah (1998)

=== Film ===
- Harb Atalia (2005)
- Hamada Yal'ab (2005)
- Sayd al-Heetan (2002)
- Gawaz Be Qarar Gomhoury (2001)
- Film Saqafy (2000)
- El Nems (2000)
- Sanawat Al-Ghadab (2000)
- Sa'edi fyl Gam'ah el Amrekeyyah (1998)

=== Radio and theatre ===
- Strawberry (2009) – Radio series
- Ya Khamis Ya Goma'a (2008) – Radio series
- Ahlan Ya Basha (2007) – Radio series
- Shei' Fee Sabry (2002) – Stage play
