= Beatriz Pardi =

Brazilian politician (1942–2026)

Member of the Legislative Assembly of São Paulo
- In office 15 March 1991 – 1 February 1999

Personal details
- Born: 6 June 1942 São José do Rio Preto, São Paulo, Brazil
- Died: 9 June 2026 (aged 84) São Paulo, Brazil
- Party: PT
- Occupation: Teacher

Beatriz Pardi (6 June 1942 – 9 June 2026) was a Brazilian politician. A member of the Workers' Party, she served in the Legislative Assembly of São Paulo from 1991 to 1999.

Pardi died in São Paulo on 9 June 2026, at the age of 84.
