= Noël Deschamps (singer) =

French singer (1942–2026)

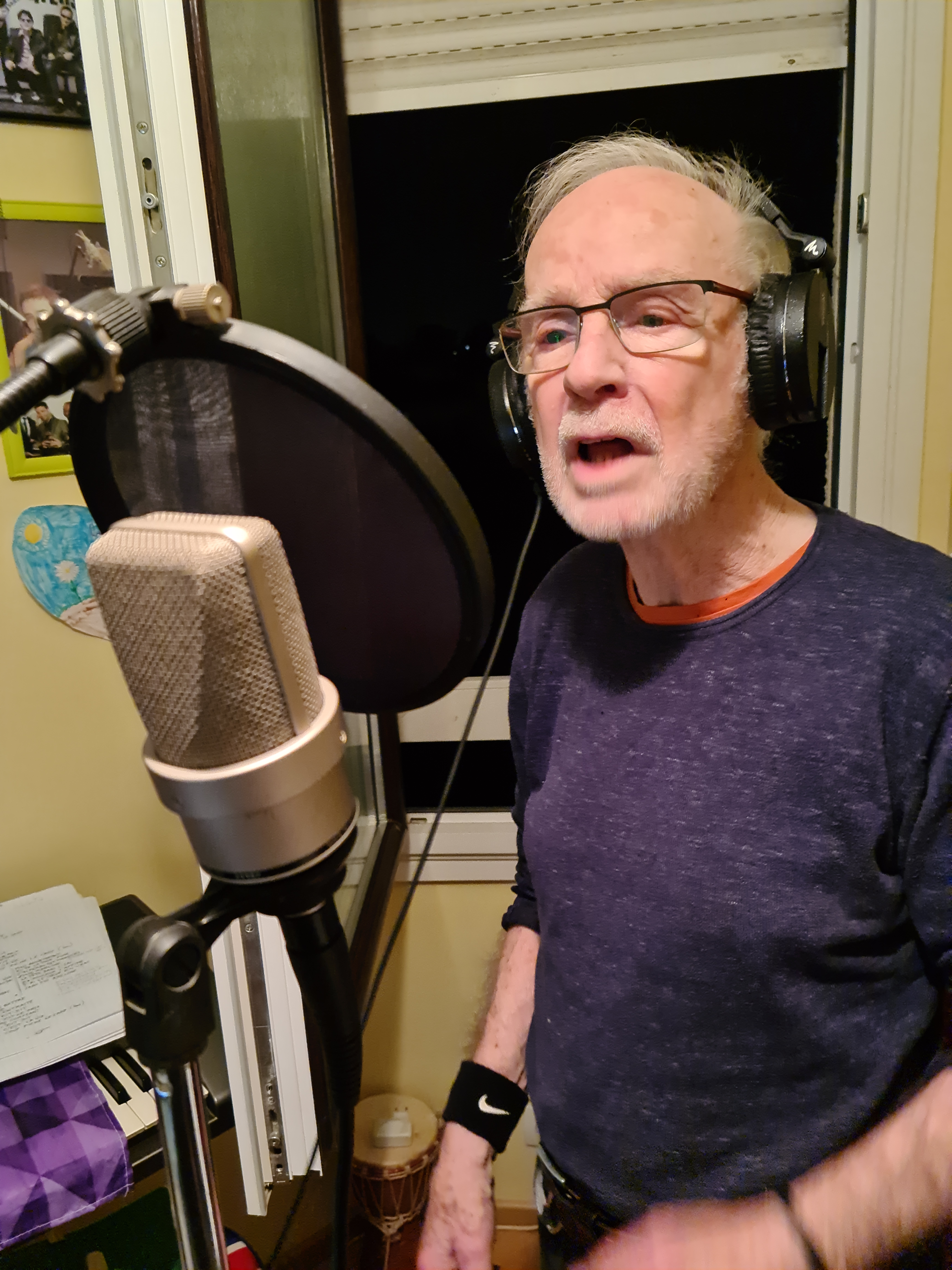
- Deschamps in 2023
- Born: 22 June 1942; Villefranche-sur-Saône, France
- Died: 21 June 2026 (aged 83); Châteauroux, France
- Occupation: Singer

Noël Deschamps (French: [nɔˈɛl dɛʃˈɑ̃]; 22 June 1942 – 21 June 2026) was a French singer.

First signing with RCA Victor in 1964, he notably performed at the Palais des Sports at a pop festival in June 1967. His most popular song was "Oh la hey", written alongside Alain Bashung in 1966.

Deschamps died in Châteauroux on 21 June 2026, one day before his 84th birthday.

== Albums ==
- Ça va bien pour moi (1967)
- Le long de l'avenue (1988)
- Ça n'est jamais assez (1996)
- C'est pas ça la vie (1997)
- Anthologie 40e anniversaire (2004)
- C'est bien ça la vie (2020)
- Retour aux sources (2023)
- 60e anniversaire 1964/2024 (2024)
- Si j'avais vu le Père Noël (2025)
