= Sam Y. Zamrik =

Syrian-American engineer (1932–2026)

Sam Yusuf Zamrik (December 11, 1932 – June 18, 2026) was a Syrian-American mechanical and consulting engineer, and Emeritus Professor at Pennsylvania State University and expert in the field of high pressure technology, and fracture mechanics. He was more generally known as president of the American Society of Mechanical Engineers from 2007 to 2008.

== Life and career ==
Zamrik born in Syria on December 11, 1932, and came to the United States in 1950. He started his studies at the University of Texas, where he obtained his BA in Mathematics in 1955, and his BSc in 1957. Next he continued his studies at the Pennsylvania State University, where he obtained his MSc in engineering in 1961, and his PhD in engineering in 1965.

After his graduation in 1965 Zamrik started his career in the industry. In 1962 he joined the Pennsylvania State University and worked his way up from instructor, assistant professor, associate professor until in 1976 he was appointed professor in the Department of Engineering Science and Mechanics. In 1998 he retired and was appointed professor emeritus. In 2007–2008 he served as president of the American Society of Mechanical Engineers.

He was awarded the Pressure Vessels and Piping Division's Robert M. McGrattan Literature Award in 1991; the Central Pennsylvania Section's Outstanding Mechanical Engineer of the Year Award in 1992; the ASME Pressure Vessel and Piping Medal in 1996; and the ASME Dedicated Service Award in 2006. In 2010 the ASME renamed the Pressure Vessel and Piping Medal to the ASME S.Y. Zamrik PVP Medal.

Zamrik died on June 18, 2026, at the age of 93.

== Selected publications ==
- Sam Yusuf Zamrik (Ingénieur mécanicien), R. I. Jetter (eds.). Advances in Design for Elevated Temperature Environment: Papers Presented at the Second National Congress on Pressure Vessels and Piping San Francisco California June 23–27, 1975. American Society of Mechanical Engineers, 1975.
- S.Y. Zamrik and E.H. Perez (eds.). High Pressure Technology, Fracture Mechanics, and Service Experience in Operating Power Plants : Presented at the 1990 Pressure Vessels and Piping Conference, Nashville, Tennessee, June 17–21, 1990.
- S.Y. Zamrik, Gary R. Halford, S.S. Manson (eds.). Material durability/life prediction modeling: materials for the 21st century : presented at 1994 International Mechanical Engineering Congress and Exposition, Chicago, Illinois, November 6–11, 1994.

Articles, a selection

- Zamrik, Sam Y. "An Interpretation of Axial Creep--Fatigue Damage Interaction in Type 316 Stainless Steel." J. Pressure Vessel Technol. (Trans. ASME) 112.1 (1990): 4-19.
- Zamrik, Sam Y., Daniel C. Davis, and Lee C. Firth. "Isothermal and thermomechanical fatigue of type 316 stainless steel." Thermomechanical Fatigue Behavior of Materials: Second Volume. ASTM International, 1996.
- Zamrik, Sam Y., and Mark L. Renauld. "Thermo-mechanical out-of-phase fatigue life of overlay coated IN-738LC gas turbine material." Thermo-mechanical Fatigue Behavior of Materials: Third Volume. ASTM International, 2000.
