= Ivan Khitskov =

Russian agriculturist and economist (1937–2026)

- Иван Хицков
- Born: 16 March 1937; Pavlovsky District, Voronezh Oblast, Russian RSFSR, Soviet Union
- Died: 20 June 2026 (aged 89)
- Education: Voronezh State University
- Occupations: Agriculturist; economist

Ivan Fyodorovich Khitskov (Russian: Иван Фёдорович Хицков; 16 March 1937 – 20 June 2026) was a Russian agriculturist and economist. A member of the Russian Academy of Sciences and the Russian Academy of Agricultural Sciences, he was a recipient of the Honored Scientist of the Russian Federation (1996).

Khitskov died on 20 June 2026, at the age of 89.
