= Rüdiger Postier =

German judge (1944–2026)

President of the Constitutional Court of Brandenburg
- In office 21 January 2009 – 9 May 2012
- Preceded by: Monika Weisberg-Schwarz
- Succeeded by: Jes Möller

Personal details
- Born: 11 February 1944 Komotau, Reichsgau Sudetenland, Germany
- Died: 11 June 2026 (aged 82)
- Occupation: Judge

Rüdiger Postier (11 February 1944 – 11 June 2026) was a German judge. He served as president of the Constitutional Court of Brandenburg from 2009 to 2012.

Postier died on 11 June 2026, at the age of 82.
