= Theo Fischer (politician, born 1937) =

Swiss politician (1937–2026)

Member of the Swiss National Council
- In office 26 November 1979 – 5 December 1999

Member of the Grand Council of Aargau
- In office 18 March 1973 – 14 March 1981

Personal details
- Born: 25 December 1937 Hägglingen, Switzerland
- Died: 3 June 2026 (aged 88)
- Party: SVP
- Occupation: Notary

Theo Fischer (25 December 1937 – 3 June 2026) was a Swiss politician of the Swiss People's Party (SVP).

Fischer served in the Grand Council of Aargau from 1973 to 1981 and in the National Council from 1979 to 1999.

Fischer died on 3 June 2026, at the age of 88.
