= Robert Parizeau =

Canadian businessman (1935–2026)

- Born: 7 November 1935; Montreal, Quebec, Canada
- Died: 2 June 2026 (aged 90); Montreal, Quebec, Canada
- Education: HEC Montréal
- Occupation: Businessman

Robert Parizeau (7 November 1935 – 2 June 2026) was a Canadian businessman.

The son of businessman Gérard Parizeau and the great-grandson of politician Damase Parizeau, he studied business at HEC Montréal. He served as president of the board of directors of the Fonds de solidarité FTQ and was also on the board for the Power Corporation of Canada. He received honorary degrees from the Université de Montréal and the Université Laval.

Parizeau died in Montreal on 2 June 2026, at the age of 90.
