= Waldo Urrego =

Colombian film, stage and television actor (1945–2026)

- Urrego in 2024
- Born: 22 July 1945; Bogotá, Colombia
- Died: 27 June 2026 (aged 80); Bogotá, Colombia
- Occupations: Film, stage and television actor

Waldo Urrego (22 July 1945 – 27 June 2026) was a Colombian film, stage and television actor. He won a TvyNovela Award in the category Best Antagonistic Actor for his performance in the Colombian telenovela television series La mujer del presidente.

Urrego died in Bogotá on 27 June 2026, at the age of 80.
