= Geraldene Felton =

American academic (1926–2026)

- Born: January 31, 1926; Norfolk, Virginia, U.S.
- Died: June 20, 2026 (aged 100); Iowa City, Iowa, U.S.
- Education: Wayne State University; New York University
- Occupation: Academic

Geraldene Felton (January 31, 1926 – June 20, 2026) was an American academic. She was the Kelting Chair Professor of Nursing at the University of Iowa.

Felton died at her home in Iowa City, Iowa, on June 20, 2025, at the age of 100.
