= Cláudio Magrão =

Brazilian politician (1953–2026)

Member of the Chamber of Deputies of Brazil for São Paulo
- In office 6 February 2007 – 3 March 2009
- In office 1 February 2003 – 31 January 2007

Personal details
- Born: Cláudio Magrão de Camargo Crê; 6 July 1953 Osasco, São Paulo, Brazil
- Died: 2 June 2026 (aged 72)
- Party: Cidadania
- Education: SENAI
- Occupation: Metallurgist

Cláudio Magrão de Camargo Crê (6 July 1953 – 2 May 2026) was a Brazilian politician. A member of Cidadania, he served in the Chamber of Deputies from 2003 to 2007 and from 2007 to 2009.

Magrão died on 2 May 2026, at the age of 72.
