= Jaan Tults =

Estonian rower and rowing coach (1946–2026)

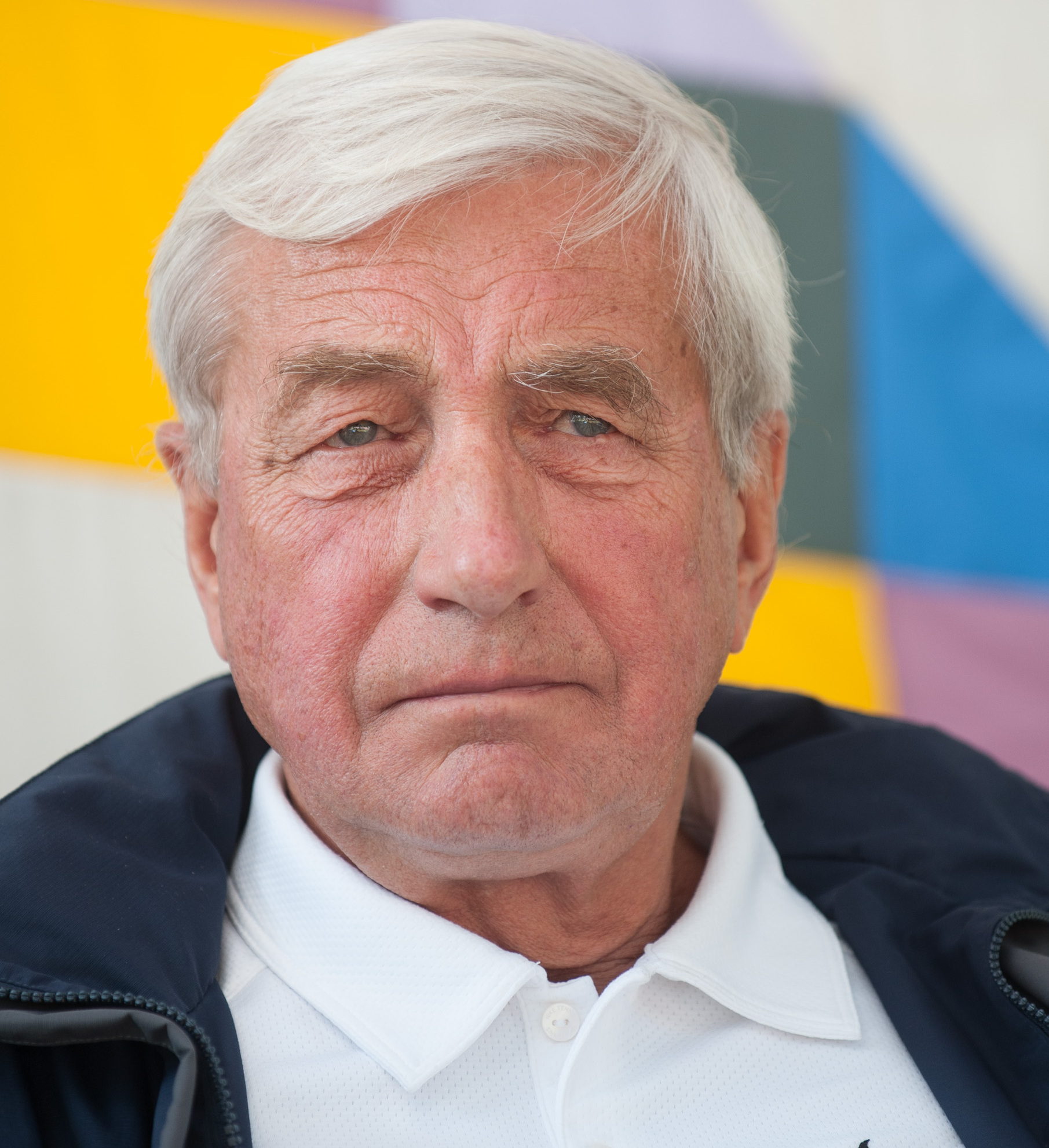
- Tults in 2014

Personal information
- Born: 30 April 1946 Pärnu, then part of Estonian SSR, Soviet Union
- Died: 1 June 2026 (aged 80)
- Resting place: Forest Cemtery, Tallinn
- Education: University of Tartu

Sport
- Sport: Rowing

Jaan Tults (30 April 1946 – 1 June 2026) was an Estonian rower, rowing coach and referee. He was a recipient of the Order of the White Star (2007).

Tults died on 1 June 2026, at the age of 80.
