= Luisa Muraro =

Italian philosopher and feminist activist (1940–2026)

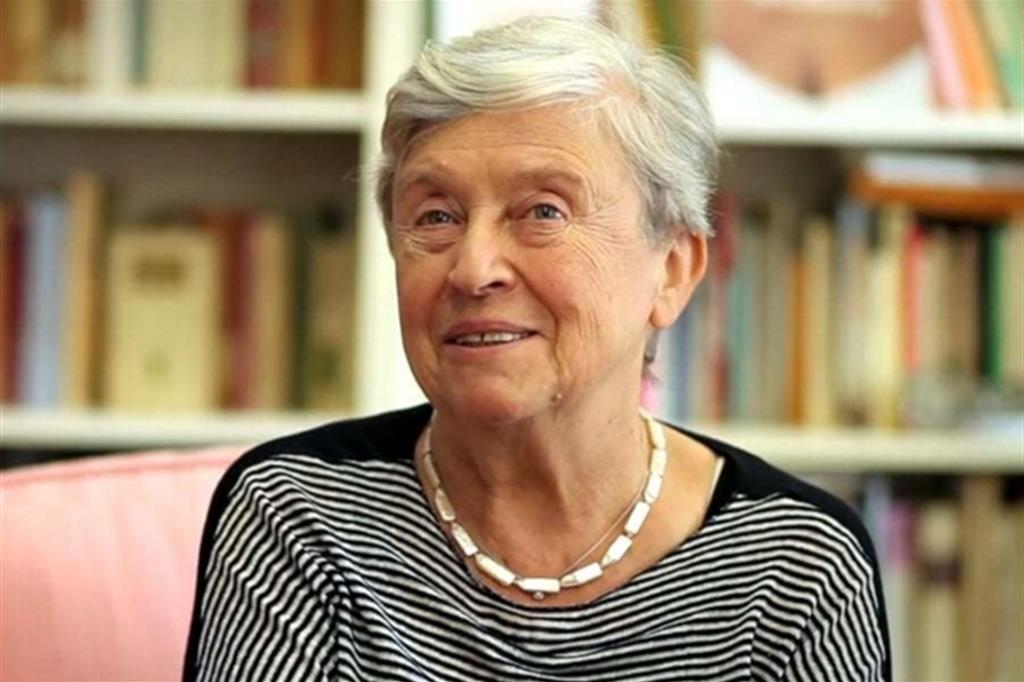
- Muraro in 2018
- Born: 14 June 1940; Montecchio Maggiore, Italy
- Died: 13 June 2026 (aged 85); Milan, Italy
- Education: Università Cattolica del Sacro Cuore
- Occupations: Philosopher; Activist

Luisa Muraro (14 June 1940 – 13 June 2026) was an Italian philosopher and feminist activist.

== Life and career ==
A graduate of the Università Cattolica del Sacro Cuore, she studied philosophical feminism with the Diotoma group of which she was a co-founder. The group is based at the University of Verona, where Muraro was a researcher and professor from 1975 to 2005. She proposed a transversal approach that rejects a politics specifically for women that would merely reinforce their subordination to men. Her work also reconstructed Biblical women, emphasizing their contributions to the feminine nature of God.

She was among the founders of the women's bookshop in Milan, 'La Libreria delle Donne' in 1975.

Muraro died in Milan on 13 June 2026, one day shy of her 86th birthday.

== Publications ==
- L'erba voglio : pratica non autoritaria nella scuola (1971)
- La signora del gioco. Episodi della caccia alle streghe (1976)
- Giambattista della Porta mago e scienziato (1978)
- Maglia o uncinetto. Racconto linguistico-politico sulla inimicizia tra metafora e metonimia (1981)
- Il pensiero della differenza sessuale (1987)
- L'ordine simbolico della madre (1991)
- Oltre l'uguaglianza. Le radici femminili dell'autorità (1994)
- Lingua materna, scienza divina. Scritti sulla filosofia mistica di Margherita Porete (1995)
- Lingua e verità in Emily Dickinson, Teresa di Lisieux, Ivy Compton-Burnett (1995)
- La politica del desiderio (1996)
- Il Dio delle donne (2003)
- Guglielma e Maifreda : storia di un'eresia femminista (1985)
- Le amiche di Dio. Margherita e le altre (2001)
- La signora del gioco. La caccia alle streghe interpretata dalle sue vittime (2006)
- Al Mercato della felicità : la forza irrinunciabile del desiderio (2009)
- Tre Lezioni sulla differenza sessuale e altri scritti (2011)
- Non è da tutti. L'indicibile fortuna di nascere donna (2011)
- Dio è violent (2012)
- Autorità (2013)
- L'anima del corpo : contro l'utero in affitto (2016)
