= Kwon Heon-seong =

South Korean politician (1958–2026)

- 권헌성

Member of the National Assembly of South Korea
- In office 30 May 1988 – 29 May 1992

Personal details
- Born: 11 October 1958
- Died: 9 June 2026 (aged 67)
- Party: RDP
- Education: Princeton University (BA)
- Occupation: Civil servant

Kwon Heon-seong (Korean: 권헌성; 11 October 1958 – 9 June 2026) was a South Korean politician. A member of the Reunification Democratic Party, he served in the National Assembly from 1988 to 1992.

Kwon died on 9 June 2026, at the age of 67.
