= Juan Andrés Larre =

Uruguayan footballer (1967–2026)

Personal information
- Full name: Juan Andrés Pablo Larre Stivan
- Date of birth: August 5, 1967
- Place of birth: San José de Mayo, Uruguay
- Date of death: June 8, 2026 (aged 58)
- Height: 1.78 m (5 ft 10 in)
- Position: Midfielder

Senior career*
Years	Team	Apps	(Gls)
1985–1987	Bella Vista		
1987–1990	Chamois Niortais	49	(9)
1990–1993	Gazélec Ajaccio	77	(15)
1993–1995	Nacional Montevideo	23	(7)
1995–1997	Angers	32	(5)

International career
	Uruguay	6	(0)
- * Club domestic league appearances and goals

Juan Andrés Pablo Larre Stivan (August 5, 1967 – June 8, 2026) was a Uruguayan professional footballer who played as a midfielder. He died on June 8, 2026, aged 58.
