= Pierre Izard =

French politician (1935–2026)

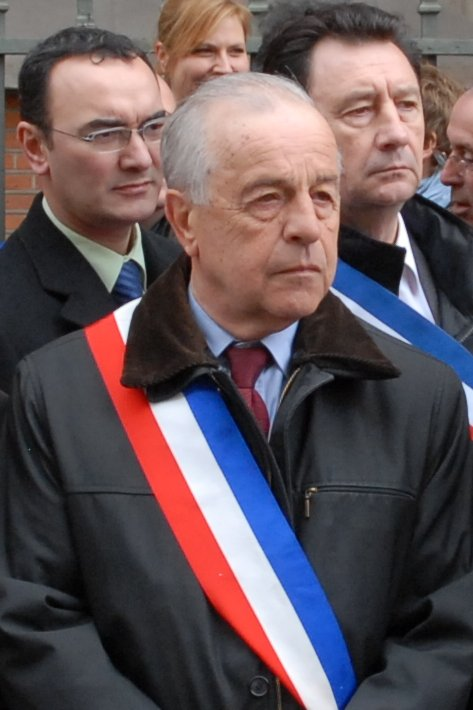
- Izard in 2007

President of the General Council of Haute-Garrone
- In office 7 October 1988 – 2 April 2015
- Preceded by: Léon Eeckhoutte
- Succeeded by: Georges Méric

Member of the General Council of Haute-Garonne for the Canton of Villefranche-de-Lauragais
- In office 24 September 1967 – 2 April 2015
- Preceded by: Roger Alias
- Succeeded by: canton abolished

Mayor of Villefranche-de-Lauragais
- In office 21 March 1971 – 18 March 2001
- Preceded by: Roger Alias
- Succeeded by: Marie-Claude Piquemal-Doumeng

Personal details
- Born: 11 July 1935 Villefranche-de-Lauragais, France
- Died: 1 June 2026 (aged 90)
- Party: PS
- Education: University of Toulouse
- Occupation: Pediatrician

Pierre Izard (French: [pjˈɛʁ izˈaʁ]; 11 July 1935 – 1 June 2026) was a French politician of the Socialist Party (PS).

A pediatrician by trade after his father was also a doctor, he served as mayor of Villefranche-de-Lauragais from 1971 to 2001 and was a member of the General Council of Haute-Garone from 1967 to 2015. He was also its president from 1988 to 2015.

Izard died on 1 June 2026, at the age of 90.
