= Ingo Weiß =

German politician (1937–2026)

Member of the Landtag of Bavaria
- In office 22 November 1970 – 25 April 1978

Personal details
- Born: 24 January 1937 Neuburg an der Donau, Gau Swabia, Germany
- Died: 23 June 2026 (aged 89)
- Party: CSU
- Education: University of Erlangen–Nuremberg; LMU Munich
- Occupation: Civil servant

Ingo Weiß (24 January 1937 – 23 June 2026) was a German politician. A member of the Christian Social Union in Bavaria, he served in the Parliament of the state of Bavaria from 1970 to 1978.

Weiß died on 23 June 2026, at the age of 89.
