= Józef Nowicki =

Polish politician (1944–2026)

Member of the Sejm
- In office 19 September 1993 – 18 October 2005

Personal details
- Born: 14 August 1944 Eschnersaue, Gau March of Brandenburg, Germany (now Wieprzyce Dolne, Poland)
- Died: 23 June 2026 (aged 81) Konin, Poland
- Occupation: Politician

Józef Nowicki (14 August 1944 – 23 June 2026) was a Polish politician who served as member of the Sejm from 1993 to 2005. He also was a city president of Konin from 2010 to 2018.

Nowicki died in Konin on 23 June 2026, at the age of 81.
