= Ken Legan =

American politician (1946–2026)

Member of the Missouri House of Representatives
- In office 1981–2002

Personal details
- Born: Kenneth Dale Legan; August 3, 1946 Halfway, Missouri, U.S.
- Died: June 2, 2026 (aged 79) Bolivar, Missouri, U.S.
- Party: Republican
- Spouse: Rebecca Bodenhamer (m. 1969)
- Education: University of Missouri

Kenneth Dale Legan (August 3, 1946 – June 2, 2026) was an American politician. A member of the Republican Party, he served in the Missouri House of Representatives from 1981 to 2002.

== Early life and career ==
Legan was born in Halfway, Missouri, the son of A.J. Legan, a Missouri representative, and June Jones. He attended Halfway High School, graduating in 1964. After graduating, he attended the University of Missouri, earning his bachelor's degree in animal science, which after earning his degree, he served in the United States Army from 1969 to 1971. After his discharge, he worked as a farmer.

He served in the Missouri House of Representatives from 1981 to 2002.

== Personal life and death ==
In 1969, Legan married Rebecca Bodenhamer. Their marriage lasted until Legan’s death in 2026.

Legan died in Bolivar, Missouri on June 2, 2026, at the age of 79.
