= Matthieu d'Epenoux =

French businessman and board game designer (1965–2026)

- Born: 10 October 1965
- Died: 3 June 2026 (aged 60)
- Occupations: Businessman; Board game designer

Matthieu d'Epenoux (French: [matjˈø dˈe'epɛnˈu]; 10 October 1965 – 3 June 2026) was a French businessman and board game designer.

The founder of board game publishing company Cocktail Games, he created games such as Contrario and Illico Presto.

D'Epenoux died on 3 June 2026, at the age of 60.
