= Rob Scheller =

Dutch art historian (1927–2026)

Robert Wouter Hans Pieter Scheller (11 July 1927 – 27 June 2026) was a Dutch art historian. He was professor of art history, specializing in the Middle Ages, at the University of Amsterdam between 1969 and 1992.

Scheller was born in Amsterdam to a Swiss mother. He obtained his doctorate in art history at the University of Amsterdam in 1966 under professor J.Q. van Regteren Altena.

Scheller was elected member of the Royal Netherlands Academy of Arts and Sciences in 1981.

Scheller died on 27 June 2026, at the age of 98.
