= Stephen Fender =

American-born British academic and writer

- Born: Stephen Allen Fender; 6 August 1936; San Francisco, California, U.S.
- Died: 26 June 2026 (aged 89)
- Education: Stanford University; Cardiff University; Manchester University
- Occupations: Academic, writer

Stephen Allen Fender (6 August 1936 – 26 June 2026) was an American-born British academic and writer.

== Life and career ==
Fender was born in San Francisco, California. He attended high school in Connecticut, and attended Stanford University, earning his BA degree. He worked as a copyboy for the San Francisco Chronicle. He also attended Cardiff University and Manchester University, earning his PhD degree.

Fender served as a professor at University College London and the University of Sussex, where he taught American studies. He was also a lecturer in American literature at the University of Edinburgh. As a writer, he wrote the books Plotting the Golden West: American Literature and the Rhetoric of the California Trail, Sea Changes: British Emigration and American Literature, American and European National Identities: Faces in the Mirror, and American Literature in Context, I.

== Death ==
Fender died at his home on 26 June 2026, at the age of 89.
