= Patrick Négrier =

French philosopher (1956–2026)

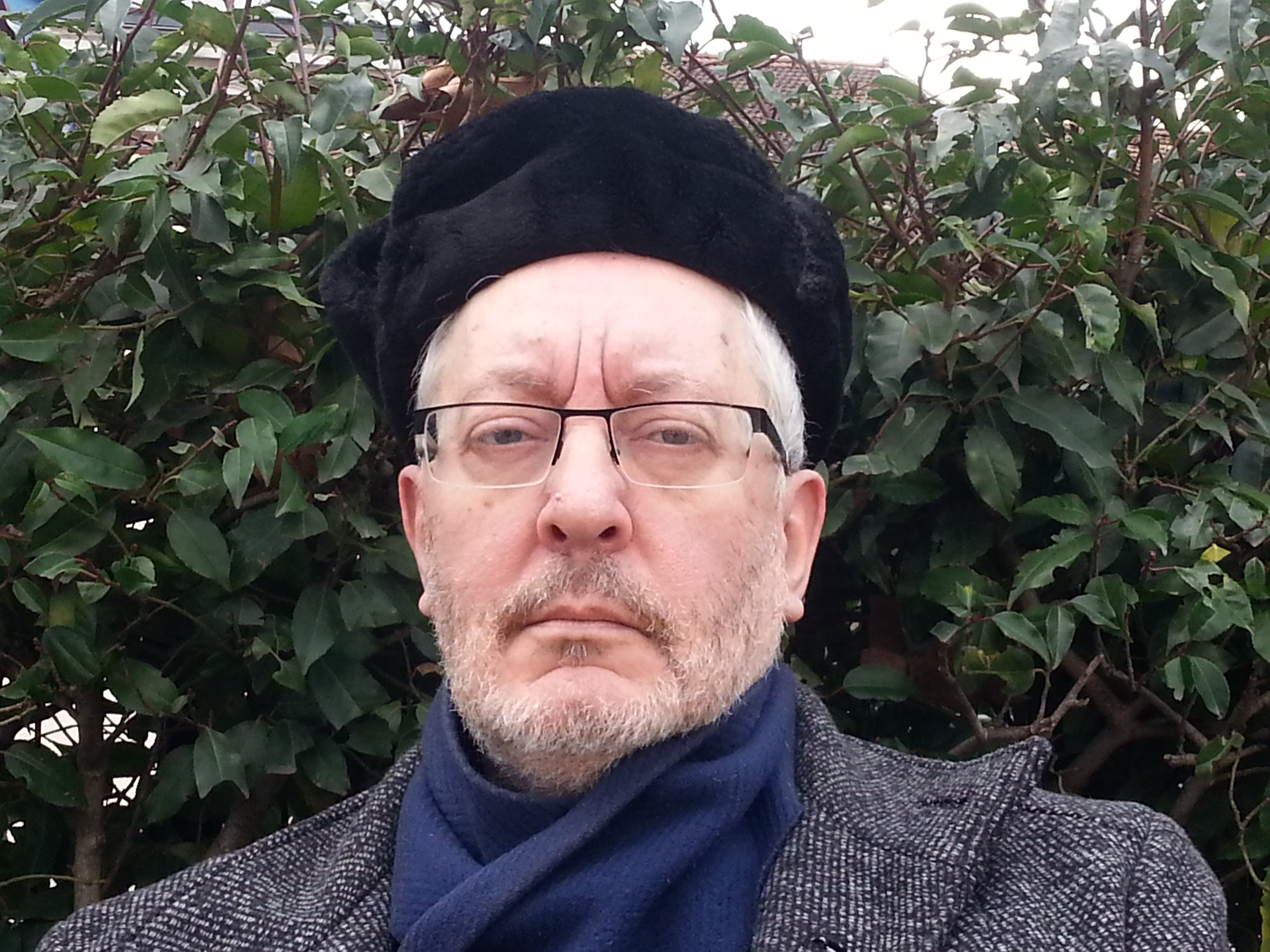
- Négrier in 2018
- Born: 30 April 1956; Aubusson, France
- Died: 3 June 2026 (aged 70)
- Occupation: Philosopher

Patrick Négrier (French: [patʁˈik neɡʁiˈe]; 30 April 1956 – 3 June 2026) was a French philosopher.

Négrier primarily specialized in the study of Western esotericism and Freemasonry.

Négrier died on 3 June 2026, at the age of 70.

== Publications ==
- L'Initiation maçonnique (1991)
- Textes fondateurs de la Tradition maçonnique (1390–1760) (1995)
- La Franc-maçonnerie d'après ses textes classiques. Anthologie (1599–1967) (1996)
- Le Temple de Salomon et ses origines égyptiennes (1996)
- Le Temple et sa symbolique. Symbolique cosmique et philosophie de l’architecture sacrée (1997)
- La Pensée maçonnique du XIVe au XXe siècle (1998)
- La Tradition initiatique. Idées et figures autour de la franc-maçonnerie (2001)
- La Bible et l'Égypte. Introduction à l'ésotérisme biblique (2002)
- L'Eclectisme maçonnique suivi de Herméneutique maçonnique et philosophie biblique (2003)
- Temple de Salomon et diagrammes symboliques. Iconologie des tableaux de loge et du cabinet de réflexion (2004)
- La Tulip. Histoire du rite du Mot de maçon de 1637 à 1730 (2005)
- Le Rite des Anciens devoirs. Old charges (1390–1729) (2006)
- Art royal et régularité dans la tradition de 1723–1730 (2009)
- Les Ziggurats et la Bible (2011)
- L'Essence de la franc-maçonnerie à travers ses textes fondateurs 1356–1751 (2018)
- La loge Thébah et le "Mouvement Cosmique", 1901–2000 (2019)
- La Pensée maçonnique 1370–1884 (2022)
