= Patrick Céleste =

French architect (1947–2026)

- Born: 1947
- Died: 14 June 2026 (aged 78–79)
- Education: Diplôme d'études approfondies
- Occupation: Architect

Patrick Céleste (French: [patʁˈik selˈɛst]; 1947 – 14 June 2026) was a French architect.

After he received his Diplôme d'études approfondies, he became a senior lecturer at the École nationale supérieure d'architecture de Paris-Malaquais. He worked as an architect and urban planner on projects such as the Avenue de France, the zone d'aménagement concerté of the Bassin de la Villette, and La Joliette in Marseille.

Céleste died on 14 June 2026.

== Publications ==
- Architecture contemporaine à Versailles (1978)
- Philippe Panerai, Lecture d'une ville : Versailles (1980)
- Paris comme forme urbaine (1983)
- Images et imaginaires d'architecture, en Europe et aux xixe et xxe siècles (1984)
- Les Cahiers de la Recherche Architecturale (1988)
- Patrimoine et développement des cœurs de ville (2003)
