= Geneviève Aubry =

Swiss politician (1928–2026)

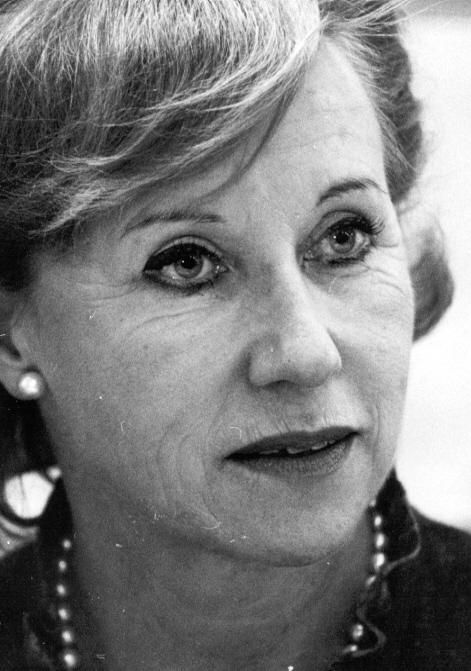
- Aubry in 1986

Member of the National Council
- In office 26 November 1979 – 3 December 1995

Personal details
- Born: 4 March 1928 La Chaux-de-Fonds, Switzerland
- Died: 20 June 2026 (aged 98) La Neuveville, Switzerland
- Party: FDP
- Occupation: Politician

Geneviève Aubry (4 March 1928 – 20 June 2026) was a Swiss politician who was a member of the National Council from 1979 to 1995.

== Death ==
Aubry died in La Neuveville on 20 June 2026, at the age of 98.
