= Ken Lewis (cricketer) =

Welsh cricketer (1928–2026)

Personal information
- Full name: Kenneth Humphrey Lewis
- Born: 10 November 1928; Penygloddfa, Newtown, Montgomeryshire, Wales
- Died: 28 June 2026 (aged 97); Newtown, Powys, Wales
- Batting: Right-handed
- Bowling: Right-arm fast-medium

Domestic team information
- Years: Team
- 1950–1956: Glamorgan

Career statistics
Competition	First-class
Matches	36
Runs scored	312
Batting average	9.17
100s/50s	0/0
Top score	34
Balls bowled	4170
Wickets	55
Bowling average	37.16
5 wickets in innings	0
10 wickets in match	0
Best bowling	4/25
Catches/stumpings	15/–
- Source: Cricinfo, 15 October 2020

Kenneth Humphrey Lewis (10 November 1928 – 28 June 2026) was a Welsh cricketer who played first-class cricket for Glamorgan from 1950 to 1956.

== Biography ==
Lewis was a fast bowler from Newtown in Montgomeryshire whose career was hampered by injury. He was one of a family of five sons and five daughters; his father was a postman.

While serving in the Royal Artillery during his national service in the late 1940s, Lewis took wickets regularly for services teams, and was signed by Glamorgan in 1950. He appeared in 36 first-class matches over seven seasons before a serious leg injury ended his career in 1956. He scored 312 runs with a highest score of 34 and took 55 wickets with a best performance of 4 for 25 in Glamorgan's innings victory over Kent in 1953.

After his playing career ended, Lewis returned to Newtown, where he served as president of the town's cricket club. He died in Newtown on 28 June 2026, aged 97. Prior to his death, he was Glamorgan's oldest living first-class player.
