= Chatch Kuldilok =

Thai politician (1943–2026)

- ชัจจ์ กุลดิลก

Member of the House of Representatives of Thailand
- In office 3 July 2011 – 25 August 2011

Personal details
- Born: 24 June 1943
- Died: 16 June 2026 (aged 82) Siriraj Hospital, Bangkok, Thailand
- Party: PTP
- Education: Royal Police Cadet Academy (BA)
- Occupation: Police officer, politician

Chatch Kuldilok (Thai: ชัจจ์ กุลดิลก; 24 June 1943 – 16 June 2026) was a Thai politician. A member of the Pheu Thai Party, he served in the House of Representatives from July to August 2011.

Kuldilok died from a stroke in Bangkok, on 16 June 2026, at the age of 82.
