= Barbora Tlučhořová =

Czech radio presenter (1988–2026)

- Born: 12 September 1988; Příbram, Czechoslovakia
- Died: 22 June 2026 (aged 37); Czech Republic
- Occupation: Radio presenter

Barbora "Bára" Tlučhořová (12 September 1988 – 22 June 2026) was a Czech radio presenter for Radio Kiss.

== Life and career ==
Tlučhořová started as a presenter on Kiss Southern Bohemia radio in November 2013. By February 2014, she became been one of the presenters of the newly created morning show Jižní rána. From April 2017, after the regional versions of Radio Kiss were unified under a single nationwide broadcast, she remained on its airwaves and, with her colleague Roman Anděl, hosted the show Ranní Kiss s Bárou a Romanem.

During the summer holidays in 2019, Tlučhořová interrupted her career as a presenter due to illness. After six months, she returned to the airwaves until her pregnancy in 2022. In 2025, her illness returned and on 12 September 2025, on her 37th birthday, her mother announced together with the program director of Kiss Radio Roman Anděl that she would no longer return to the radio because she had lost her sight due to a brain tumor and was dependent on 24-hour care.

Tlučhořová died from cancer on 22 June 2026, at the age of 37.
