= Marie Viková =

Czech actress (1935–2026)

- Viková in 1961
- Born: 14 July 1935; Olomouc, Czechoslovakia
- Died: 28 June 2026 (aged 90)
- Education: Academy of Performing Arts in Prague
- Occupations: Film, television and theatre actress

Marie Viková Tuláčková (14 July 1935 – 28 June 2026) was a Czech film, television and theatre actress.

== Life and career ==
Viková was born in Olomouc on 14 July 1935. She attended the Academy of Performing Arts in Prague, studying acting. She joined the Petr Bezruč Theatre in Ostrava under the direction of Jan Kačer in the late 1950s. During her theatre career, she won a Literary Fund Award for her performance in the play Chicken Head. Her final theatre role was as the grandmother in the 2018 play Maryša.

Viková began her screen career in 1973, appearing in the television program Haldy. She also appeared in television programs including Bakaláři, U nás doma, Dispečer and Modrý kód, and also in films such as Bathory, Vzestup po šikmé ploše, Město nic neví, Peklo s princeznou, Mládí na prodej and Mimořádný případ. Her final screen role was in the 2022 film Za vším hledej ženu.

== Death ==
Viková died on 28 June 2026, at the age of 90.
