= Jean-Claude Biojout =

French basketball player (1939–2026)

Personal information
- Born: 1939 Limoges, France
- Died: 22 June 2026 (aged 86–87)
- Position: Point guard

Career history
- ?–?: CSP Limoges

Jean-Claude Biojout (French: [ʒˈɑ̃-klˈod bjoʒˈu]; 1939 – 22 June 2026) was a French basketball player who played as a point guard.

Biojout played his entire career with CSP Limoges in the 1950s and 60s and remained active with the club after his retirement. His son, Pascal, founded Sport Plus Conseil, a sports management firm.

Biojout died on 22 June 2026.
