= Remigio Cortés =

Chilean horse groomer and rodeo performer (1931–2026)

- Born: Remigio Segundo Cortés Palma; 10 August 1931; Las Cabras, Chile
- Died: 21 June 2026 (aged 94)
- Occupations: Horse groomer, rodeo performer

Remigio Segundo Cortés Palma (10 August 1931 – 21 June 2026), nicknamed "Don Remi", was a Chilean horse groomer and rodeo rider. A champion of the reining movement, he was named the Master Arranger of the Huasa Equestrian School by the National Sports Federation of Chilean Rodeo in 2021.

Cortés died on 21 June 2026, at the age of 94.
