= Boris Grițunic =

Moldovan architect (1948–2026)

- Born: 29 May 1948; Sofia, Drochia District, Moldavian SSR, USSR
- Died: 23 June 2026 (aged 78); Bălți, Moldova
- Occupation: Architect

Boris Grițunic (29 May 1948 – 23 June 2026) was a Moldovan architect. He was a recipient of the Civil Merit Medal of the Republic of Moldova (1995).

Grițunic died on 23 June 2026, at the age of 78.
