= Thomas Alan Harris =

American politician (1933–2026)

Thomas Alan Harris (September 27, 1933 – June 10, 2026) was an American politician. An alumnus of Vanderbilt University, he was a member of the Tennessee House of Representatives from 1962 to 1966 and the Tennessee Senate from 1966 to 1968. He died on June 10, 2026, at the age of 92.
