= Eliot D. Cohen =

American electrical engineer (1942–2026)

- Born: Eliot Dorsey Cohen; March 10, 1942; Washington, D.C., U.S.
- Died: June 17, 2026 (aged 84); North Potomac, Maryland, U.S.
- Education: George Washington University
- Occupation: Electrical engineer
- Spouse: Barbara Susan (died. 2014)

Eliot Dorsey Cohen (March 10, 1942 – June 17, 2026) was an American electrical engineer.

== Early life and career ==
Cohen was born in Washington, D.C., the son of Walter Cohen and Clara Goldberg. He attended George Washington University, earning his bachelor's degree in electrical engineering in 1963 and his master's degree in engineering in 1966.

He worked as a electrical engineer and high frequency devices secretary at the United States Naval Research Laboratory from 1963 to 1980. He also worked as program manager and deputy director at DARPA from 1988 to 1991. In 1991, he was named a fellow of the Institute of Electrical and Electronics Engineers, "for leadership in the advancement of microwave and millimeter-wave monolithic integrated circuits".

In 2003, Cohen was inducted into the Space Technology Hall of Fame.

== Personal life and death ==
Cohen was married to Barbara Susan. Their marriage lasted until her death in 2014.

Cohen died in North Potomac, Maryland on June 17, 2026, at the age of 84.
