= Alain Schifres =

French journalist (1939–2026)

- Born: 14 February 1939; Montmorency, France
- Died: 8 June 2026 (aged 87)
- Education: Sciences Po (DESS)
- Occupation: Journalist

Alain Schifres (French pronunciation: [alˈɛ̃ ʃˈifʁ]; 14 February 1939 – 8 June 2026) was a French journalist.

Schifres earned a Diplôme d'études supérieures spécialisées from the Sciences Po and began working for Réalités. In 1986, he received the Prix de la fondation Mumm.

Schifres died on 8 June 2026, at the age of 87.

== Publications ==
- Entretiens avec Arrabal (1969)
- Ceux qui savent de quoi je parle comprendront ce que je veux dire (1986)
- Les Yeux ronds (1988)
- Les Parisiens (1990)
- Les Hexagons (1994)
- Le Cousin (1997)
- Nouveau dictionnaire des idées reçues, des propos convenus et des tics de langage ou Le dîner sans peine (1998)
- La Chute des corps (2003)
- Dictionnaire amoureux des menus plaisirs (2005)
- Inventaire curieux des choses de la France (2008)
- Dictionnaire amoureux du bonheur (2012)
- My tailor is rich but my français is poor (2014)
- Sympa (2016)
- Je préfère ne pas (2020)
