= Vittorio Parisi (politician) =

Italian politician (1936–2026)

Member of the Senate of the Republic of Italy
- In office 23 April 1992 – 14 April 1994

Personal details
- Born: 5 July 1936 Milan, Italy
- Died: 21 June 2026 (aged 89) Parma, Italy
- Party: PRC
- Occupation: Academic

Vittorio Parisi (5 July 1936 – 21 June 2026) was an Italian politician. A member of the Communist Refoundation Party, he served in the Senate of the Republic from 1992 to 1994.

Parisi died in Parma on 21 June 2026, at the age of 89.
