= Manuel Benza Pflücker =

Peruvian politician (1944–2026)

Member of the Congress of the Republic of Peru
- In office 27 July 1985 – 27 July 1990

Personal details
- Born: Manuel Germán Benza Pflücker; 16 April 1944 Lima, Peru
- Died: 17 June 2026 (aged 82) Lima, Peru
- Party: PSR
- Education: Pontifical Catholic University of Peru
- Occupation: Journalist

Manuel Germán Benza Pflücker (16 April 1944 – 17 June 2026) was a Peruvian politician. A member of the Revolutionary Socialist Party, he served in the Congress of the Republic from 1985 to 1990.

Benza Pflücker died in Lima on 17 June 2026, at the age of 82.
