= Portchie =

South African painter and sculptor (1963–2026)

Jan Hendrik Viljoen (23 November 1963 – 12 June 2026), better known as Portchie, was a South African painter and sculptor. He died on the morning of 12 June 2026, at the age of 62.
