= Ramamurthy Gamango =

Indian politician (1951–2026)

Member of the Odisha Legislative Assembly for Gunupur
- In office 29 February 2000 – 6 February 2004
- Preceded by: Bhagirathi Gomango
- Succeeded by: Hema Gamang
- In office 3 March 1990 – 15 March 1995
- Preceded by: Bhagirathi Gomango
- Succeeded by: Akshya Kumar Gomango

Personal details
- Born: 1 March 1951
- Died: 12 June 2026 (aged 75)
- Party: BJP; Janata Dal (former)

Ramamurthy Gamango (1 March 1951 – 12 June 2026) was an Indian politician. A member of the Bharatiya Janata Party, he served in the Odisha Legislative Assembly from 1990 to 1995 and again from 2000 to 2004.

On 20 June 2023, Gamango was found guilty and convicted for the 1995 murder of his wife, Sashirekha. His wife had been found dead in the bathroom of his Bhubaneswar residence on 29 August 1995.

Gamango died from complications of diabetes on 12 June 2026, at the age of 75.
