= Mihalis Mosios =

Greek film and stage actor (1947–2026)

- Μιχάλης Μόσιος
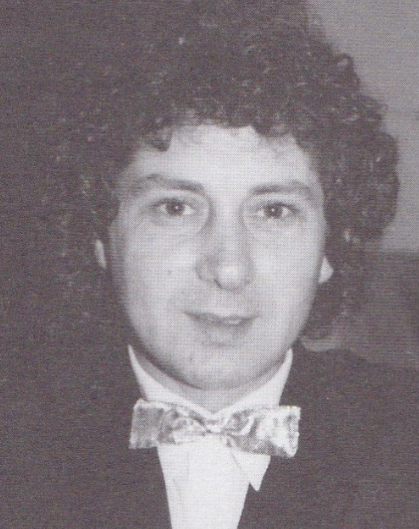
- Born: 10 March 1947; Thessaloniki, Greece
- Died: 30 June 2026 (aged 79); Keratea, Greece
- Occupations: Film and stage actor
- Years active: 1972–2016

Mihalis Mosios (Greek: Μιχάλης Μόσιος; 10 March 1947 – 30 June 2026) was a Greek film and stage actor. He appeared in over 30 films between 1972 to 2016, and was best known for playing Tamtakos in the 1980 film Xevrakotos Romios.

Mosios died in Keratea on 30 June 2026, at the age of 79.
