= Etienne Cooreman =

Belgian politician (1928–2026)

Member of the Senate of Belgium
- In office 7 November 1971 – 20 May 1995

Member of the Chamber of Representatives of Belgium
- In office 1 June 1958 – 30 March 1968

Member of the Flemish Council
- In office 7 December 1971 – 23 November 1991

Personal details
- Born: 14 November 1928 Zele, Belgium
- Died: 15 June 2026 (aged 97)
- Party: CVP
- Occupation: Lawyer

Etienne Cooreman (14 November 1928 – 15 June 2026) was a Belgian politician. A member of the Christian People's Party, he served in the Chamber of Representatives from 1958 to 1968, the Flemish Council from 1971 to 1991, and the Senate from 1971 to 1995.

Cooreman died on 15 June 2026, at the age of 97.
