= François Gall (film director) =

French film director and author (1922–2026)

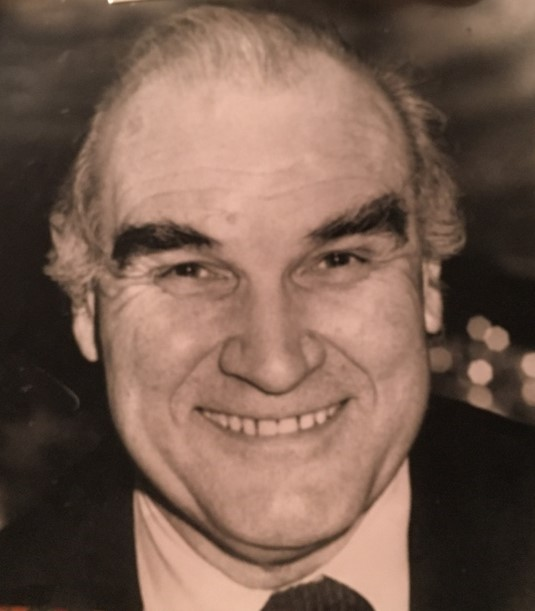
- Born: 9 November 1922; Saint-Germain-en-Laye, France
- Died: 13 June 2026 (aged 103); Paris, France
- Occupations: Film director Author

François Gall (French: [fʁɑ̃swˈa ɡˈɔːl]; 9 November 1922 – 13 June 2026) was a French film director and author.

In his youth, he was an active member of the French Resistance. After World War II, he began his career as a journalist, working as a correspondent during the First Indochina War. In television, he was longtime director of the documentary series Amazing Train Journeys. On 21 November 1996, he was inducted into the Legion of Honour, awarded at the Hôtel de Lassay.

Gall died in Paris on 13 June 2026, at the age of 103.

== Publications ==
- Les invités du tour du monde (1958)
- Les Aventures de Vermeille de Plancy au XIIIe siècle. 1, Vermeille et le plus grand prince de la terre (1996)
- Les Aventures de Vermeille de Plancy au XIIIe siècle. 2, Or, feu, sang, Vermeille (1967)
- Marie, le ciel ouvert (1968)
- Mauve aux étranges amours (1968)
- 9 seigneurs d'Extrême-Orient... (1974)
- Un Médecin dans la nuit (1974)
- La Route carnivore (1976)
- Le Pain et le fouet (1977)
- Alba (1977)
- L'Or et l'amour (1978)
- Alba, l'or et l'amour (1978)
