= Arlette Testyler =

French Holocaust survivor and human rights campaigner (1933–2026)

- Born: Arlette Reiman; 30 March 1933; Paris, France
- Died: 12 June 2026 (aged 93)
- Occupation: Activist

Arlette Testyler (née Reiman; 30 March 1933 – 12 June 2026) was a French Holocaust survivor and human rights campaigner.

== Biography ==
Born in Paris on 30 March 1933, she was the daughter of Polish Jews; her father was Abraham Reiman, a fur trader. Abraham became a volunteer in the French Armed Forces in 1939 before his demobilizaton; he was arrested in May 1941 amidst the green ticket roundup. Testyler was arrested during the Vel' d'Hiv roundup and subsequently interned at the Beaune-la-Rolande internment camp. However, she escaped along with her sister and found protection by Jeanne and Jean Philippeau in Vendôme. After the Holocaust, she worked to have the couple recognized as Righteous Among the Nations, a goal achieved and celebrated with a ceremony on 16 June 2025. She was married to Charles Testyler, who died in 2018.

Testyler died on 12 June 2026, at the age of 93.

== Publications ==
- Les Enfants aussi ! (2010)
- J’avais 9 ans quand ils nous ont raflées (2024)

== Honors ==
- Legion of Honour
  - Knight (2011)
  - Officer (2025)
- Commander of the Ordre des Palmes académiques (2025)
