= Eugène Attigan =

Togolese journalist (1970–2026)

- Born: 20 December 1970; Lomé, Togo
- Died: 3 June 2026 (aged 55)
- Occupations: Journalist; television presenter

Eugène Attigan (20 December 1970 – 3 June 2026) was a Togolese journalist and television presenter.

== Life and career ==
Born in Lomé in 1970, Attigan began his career with Togolese Television, presenting popular shows such as Télé Loisirs and Le Grand Rendez-vous. In September 2009, he was arrested at Lomé–Tokoin International Airport while preparing to board a flight to Paris after he was found to be carrying several kilograms of cocaine in his luggage. He denied the charges, claiming he was unaware of the contents of the bag and carrying it for someone else. In December 2011, he was sentenced to ten years in prison, but received a presidential pardon on 18 September 2017.

Attigan died on 3 June 2026, at the age of 55.
