= Gennady Ireykin =

Russian aviation navigator (1940–2026)

- Геннадий Ирейкин
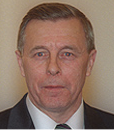
- Ireykin in 2000
- Born: 26 November 1940; Baryshsky District, Samara Oblast, Russian RSFSR, Soviet Union
- Died: 29 June 2026 (aged 85)
- Occupation: Aviation navigator

Gennady Grigorievich Ireykin (Russian: Геннадий Григорьевич Ирейкин; 26 November 1940 – 29 June 2026) was a Russian aviation navigator. He was a recipient of the Hero of the Russian Federation (2000).

Ireykin died on 29 June 2026, at the age of 85.
