= Jeong Gi-seung =

South Korean judge (1928–2026)

Jeong Gi-Seung
- 정기승

Justice of the Supreme Court of Korea
- In office 11 March 1985 – 10 July 1988

Personal details
- Born: 23 July 1928 Gongju, Korea, Empire of Japan
- Died: 24 June 2026 (aged 97)
- Education: Seoul National University (LLB)
- Occupation: Judge

Jeong Gi-Seung (Korean: 정기승; 23 July 1928 – 24 June 2026) was a South Korean judge. He served as a justice of the Supreme Court from 1985 to 1988.

Jeong died on 24 June 2026, at the age of 97.
