= Albert Sans =

Spanish choreographer and dancer (1932–2026)

- Born: Albert Sans i Arís; 1932; Rubí, Spain
- Died: 9 June 2026 (aged 94); Rubí, Spain
- Occupations: Choreographer, dancer

Albert Sans i Arís (1932 – 9 June 2026) was a Spanish choreographer and dancer. He was a recipient of the Creu de Sant Jordi (1992).

Sans died in Rubí on 9 June 2026, at the age of 94.
