= Francesco Michele Barra =

Italian politician (1947–2026)

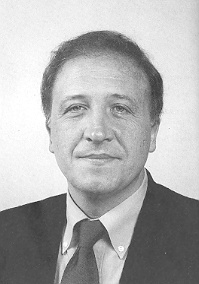
- Barra in 1994

Member of the Chamber of Deputies of Italy for Basilicata
- In office 15 April 1994 – 8 May 1996

Personal details
- Born: 6 October 1947 Castrovillari, Italy
- Died: 15 June 2026 (aged 78) Policoro, Italy
- Party: AN
- Occupation: Accountant

Francesco Michele Barra (6 October 1947 – 15 June 2026) was an Italian politician. A member of the National Alliance, he served in the Chamber of Deputies from 1994 to 1996.

Barra died in Policoro on 15 June 2026, at the age of 78.
