= Vsevolod Sevastyanov =

Russian politician (1938–2026)

- Всеволод Севастьянов

Member of the Legislative Assembly of Krasnoyarsk Krai
- In office 21 April 1994 – 6 October 2016

Personal details
- Born: 10 March 1938 Krasnoyarsk, Russian SFSR, Soviet Union
- Died: 7 June 2026 (aged 88) Krasnoyarsk, Russia
- Party: CPRF
- Education: Siberian Technological Institute
- Occupation: Civil servant

Vsevolod Nikolayevich Sevastyanov (Russian: Всеволод Николаевич Севастьянов; 10 March 1938 – 7 June 2026) was a Russian politician. A member of the Communist Party of the Russian Federation, he served in the Legislative Assembly of Krasnoyarsk Krai from 1994 to 2016.

Sevastyanov died in Krasnoyarsk on 7 June 2026, at the age of 88.
