= Roger Wierinckx =

Belgian politician (1927–2026)

Member of the Senate of Belgium
- In office 4 October 1991 – 20 May 1995

Member of the Flemish Council
- In office 7 January 1992 – 20 May 1995

Personal details
- Born: 13 November 1927 Kessel-Lo, Belgium
- Died: 17 June 2026 (aged 98) Tielt-Winge, Belgium
- Party: PPV (1961–1992); VLD
- Occupation: Civil servant

Roger Wierinckx (13 November 1927 – 17 June 2026) was a Belgian politician. A member of the Party for Freedom and Progress and the Flemish Liberals and Democrats, he served in the Senate from 1991 to 1995 and in the Flemish Council from 1992 to 1995.

Wierinckx died in Tielt-Winge on 17 June 2026, at the age of 98.
