= Carl Ekdahl =

American electrical engineer (1936–2026)

Carl August Ekdahl Jr. (May 2, 1936 – June 25, 2026) was an American electrical engineer from the Los Alamos National Laboratory. He was named Fellow of the Institute of Electrical and Electronics Engineers (IEEE) in 2015 for contributions to high-power accelerator development and the generation and transport of electron beams for flash-radiography.

Ekdahl died on June 25, 2026, at the age of 90.
