= 2026 in Italy =

- Decades: 2000s; 2010s; 2020s; 2030s
- See also: History of Italy; Timeline of Italian history; List of years in Italy

The following is a list of events of the year 2026 in Italy.

== Incumbents ==
- President – Sergio Mattarella
- Prime Minister – Giorgia Meloni

== Events ==
=== January ===
- 25 January – A landslide with a length of 4 km (2.5 mi) occurs in Niscemi, Sicily, due to Storm Harry, prompting the evacuation of 1,500 residents.

=== February ===
- 6–22 February – The 2026 Winter Olympics in Milan and Cortina d'Ampezzo.
- 15 February – Two skiers are killed in an avalanche along the Mont Blanc massif in Courmayeur.
- 17 February – A fire destroys the 19th century Teatro Sannazaro in Naples.
- 26 February – Authorities arrest Burundian national Guillaume Harushimana in Parma in connection with the 2014 murders of three Italian missionary nuns in Bujumbura.
- 27 February – A tram derails in Milan, killing two people and injuring 40 others.

=== March ===
- 2 March – An ambulance operator is arrested in Forlì after being accused of murdering five elderly patients between February and November 2025.
- 4 March – A magnitude 4.5 earthquake hits Sicily, damaging at least 600 homes in Ragalna.
- 5 March – The Italian Ministry of Defence states that Italy is to dispatch naval assets to Cyprus.
- 6–15 March – The 2026 Winter Paralympics in Milan and Cortina d'Ampezzo.
- 12 March – The Italian Armed Forces base in Erbil, Iraq is struck by an Iranian missile, with no casualties or injuries reported.
- 14 March – The Constitutional Court of Italy rules in favour of the Meloni government's 2025 decree, which significantly restricted Italian citizenship by descent.
- 15 March – An Italian MQ-9 Reaper is destroyed in an Iranian drone strike on Ali Al Salem Air Base in Kuwait.
- 21 March – Two people are killed in an avalanche at the Hohe Ferse near Ratschings.
- 22 March – Three paintings by Auguste Renoir, Paul Cézanne and Henri Matisse are stolen in an overnight heist at the Magnani-Rocca Foundation near Parma. The paintings are recovered by police in August.
- 22–23 March – 2026 Italian constitutional referendum: A proposal to reform the judiciary is rejected by 54% of voters.
- 30 March – Italy fails to qualify to the FIFA World Cup for a third consecutive time after losing to Bosnia and Herzegovina 4-1 on penalties at the 2026 FIFA World Cup qualification in Zenica.
- 31 March – Italy denies the United States Air Force the use the Sigonella base in Sicily for operations related to the war in Iran.

=== May ===
- 16 May
  - Eight people are injured in a car-ramming and stabbing in Modena.
  - Italy's Sal Da Vinci finishes fifth at Eurovision 2026 in Austria with the single "Per sempre sì".
- May–June – 2026 Italian local elections.

=== June ===
- 2 June – Four migrant workers from Afghanistan and Pakistan are found killed inside a burnt-out minivan in Calabria.
- 19 June – Prime Minister Giorgia Meloni rejects claims by United States President Donald Trump that she had "begged" him for a photograph during the 52nd G7 summit in France. The remarks cause a diplomatic row, with Foreign Minister Antonio Tajani cancelling a planned visit to the United States.

=== July ===
- 2026 Italy wildfires
- 16 July – Former Autostrade per l'Italia head Giovanni Castellucci is sentenced to 12 years' imprisonment for the Ponte Morandi collapse in 2018.
- 30 July — Italy suspends Schengen Area agreements with Spain, citing the 2026 Morocco–Spain border incident.
- 31 July — A magnitude 4.7 earthquake hits Campania, injuring 26 people.

=== August ===
- 7 August – Rafael Advanced Defense Systems' contract to run an anti-drone shield is cancelled by Rome Fiumicino Airport.
- 9 August – Spain suspends Schengen Area agreements with Italy for one month in response to similar measures imposed by the latter country over the 2026 Morocco–Spain border incident.
- 15 August – Four Renaissance paintings attributed to Antonello da Messina are stolen in an overnight heist at the Regional Museum of Messina.
- 21 August–6 September – 2026 Mediterranean Games in Taranto.

=== September ===
- 9–26 September – 2026 Men's European Volleyball Championship in Bulgaria, Finland, Italy and Romania.
- 18 September – Italy announces that it will deploy warships to protect shipping through the Bab al-Mandeb.
- 20 September – Prime Minister Meloni announces that the country would limit the number of foreign pupils per class and prohibit burqas and niqabs in schools.
- 24–27 September – 2026 Acrobatic Gymnastics World Championships in Pesaro.
- 28 September – A court in Rome sentences three Egyptian security officials to ten years imprisonment for abducting Giulio Regeni.

=== October ===
- 3 October – Marchesi Antinori warehouse theft: Around 30,000 bottles of wine valued at €5 million are stolen in a heist at a storage facility owned by Antinori in Tuscany.

=== November ===
- 3 November – Two passenger aircraft travelling from Dublin and Lisbon are searched upon landing at Rome Fiumicino Airport after being subjected to bomb threats that are subsequently found to be false.
- 5 November – Several passenger aircraft flying to Italy are searched upon landing at Rome and Milan after being subjected to bomb threats that are subsequently found to be false.
- 7 November – Deputy Prime Minister and Foreign Minister Antonio Tajani confirms that pro-Russian hackers exposed his private information on the dark web as a retaliation for Italy's backing of Ukraine.
- 11 November – More than 300 schools nationwide are subjected to bomb threats that are subsequently found to be false.
- 17 November – The Chamber of Deputies approves legislation formalizing the International Holocaust Remembrance Alliance working definition of antisemitism within national policy guidelines.

== Holidays ==
- 1 January – New Year's Day
- 6 January – Epiphany
- 5 April – Easter Sunday
- 6 April – Easter Monday
- 25 April – Liberation Day
- 1 May – International Workers' Day
- 2 June – Republic Day
- 15 August – Assumption Day
- 1 November – All Saints' Day
- 8 December – Immaculate Conception
- 25 December – Christmas Day
- 26 December – Saint Stephen's Day

== Art and entertainment ==
- List of Italian submissions for the Academy Award for Best International Feature Film
- 21st Rome Film Festival

== Deaths ==
=== January ===
- 2 January: Ivanne Trebbi, 97, partisan and politician, deputy (1979–1987).
- 3 January:
  - Natale Carlotto, 94, deputy (1976–1987).
  - Francesco Paolo Casavola, 94, president of the Constitutional Court (1992–1995).
- 4 January: Mario Blasone, 85, basketball player.
- 5 January:
  - Paolo Gillet, 96, Roman Catholic prelate, auxiliary bishop of Albano (1993–2005).
  - Pier Francesco Guarguaglini, 88, defence industry executive, chairman of Finmeccanica (2002–2011).
  - Cosimo Scaglioso, 89, senator (1994–1996).
- 6 January: Raffaele Nogaro, 92, Roman Catholic prelate, bishop of Sessa Aurunca (1982–1990) and of Caserta (1990–2009).
- 7 January:
  - Raffaella Bragazzi, 66, television presenter.
  - Domenico Graziani, 81, Roman Catholic prelate, bishop of Cassano all'Jonio (1999–2006) and archbishop of Crotone-Santa Severina (2006–2019).
- 11 January: Sergio Tarquinio, 100, painter.
- 15 January: Angelo Gugel, 90, papal assistant.
- 16 January: Rocco B. Commisso, 76, businessman and football team owner (Fiorentina).
- 19 January: Valentino, 93, fashion designer.
- 31 January: Fabio Scuto, 69, journalist (la Repubblica)

=== February ===
- 4 February: Lorenza Trucchi, 104, art critic.
- 8 February:
  - Enrico Benzing, 93, journalist (La Gazzetta dello Sport, Il Giornale).
  - Patrizia De Blanck, 85, television personality.
- 9 February:
  - Giancarlo Dettori, 93, actor (Quattro bravi ragazzi, My Sister in Law, Damned the Day I Met You).
  - Riccardo Fontana, 79, Roman Catholic prelate, archbishop of Spoleto-Norcia (1996–2009) and archbishop-bishop of Arezzo-Cortona-Sansepolcro (2009–2022).
  - Antonino Zichichi, 96, physicist.
- 20 February:
  - Giorgio Mendella, 73, telecommunications executive and fraudster, founder of Retemia.
  - Bruno Landi, 86, president of Lazio (1983–1984, 1987–1990), deputy (1992–1994).

=== March ===
- 1 March: Jacopo Camagni, 48, illustrator and comics artist.
- 2 March:
  - Eugenio Viale, 86, politician.
  - Benedetto Santapaola, 87, gangster.
- 6 March:
  - Antonio Puddu, 81, boxer.
  - Franco Vito Gaiezza, 66, musician and writer.
- 8 March: Maricla Boggio, 88, writer.
- 9 March:
  - Mario D'Acquisto, 95, politician.
  - Bruno Contrada, 94, police and intelligence officer.
- 13 March: Giovanni Bolzoni, 88, footballer (Sampdoria, Genoa, Napoli).
- 14 March: Sergio Merusi, 83, politician and economist.
- 15 March:
  - Valter Farina, 72, professional poker player.
  - Cinzia Oscar, 63, singer and stage actress.
- 19 March: Umberto Bossi, 84, MP (1987–2004, since 2008), twice MEP, and co-founder of Lega Nord.
- 21 March: Angelo Romano, 91, politician.
- 23 March: Gaspare Russo, 98, president of Campania (1976–1979) and mayor of Salerno (1970–1974).

=== April ===
- 4 April: Paolo Cherchi, 88, philologist and historian of literature.
- 23 April: Renzo Travanut, 80, politician, president of Friuli-Venezia Giulia (1994).
- 26 April: Giuseppe Commisso, 79, mobster.
- 27 April: Daniele Roscia, 72, politician, deputy (1994–2001).

=== May ===
- 1 May: Alex Zanardi, 59, racing driver and paracyclist, Paralympic champion (2012, 2016).
- 20 May: George Eastman, 83, actor (Antropophagus, Rabid Dogs) and screenwriter (Keoma).
- 21 May:
  - Vincenzo Santapaola, 56, mobster.
  - Carlo Petrini, 76, gastronomist, founder of Slow Food.

=== June ===
- 1 June: Ermanno Arslan, 85, archaeologist.
- 4 June: Claudio Appiani, 69, rugby union player (Calvisano, national team).
- 5 June: Vania Protti Traxler, 89, entrepreneur.
- 8 June:
  - Paolo Manunza, 71, footballer (Teramo, Piacenza, Ragusa).
  - Mauro Viviani, 76, footballer (Leonzio, Colligiana, Akragas).
  - Piero Pasini, 84, basketball coach.
- 9 June:
  - Matteo Fantuzzi, 46, poet.
  - Corrado Solari, 77, actor.
- 11 June: Natalino Irti, 90, academic and jurist.
- 16 June: Camillo Ruini, 95, Roman Catholic cardinal, auxiliary bishop of Reggio Emilia-Guastalla (1983–1991), president of the CEI (1991–2007) and Cardinal Vicar (1991–2008).
- 17 June: Carlo Ginzburg, 87, historian (The Cheese and the Worms, The Night Battles, Ecstasies: Deciphering the Witches' Sabbath).
- 19 June: Rodolfo Giampaoli, 86, president of Marche (1990–1993).
- 24 June: Tullio Možina, 91, Italian-born Slovene guitarist and singer.

=== July ===
- 2 July: Giacomo Lanzetti, 84, Roman Catholic prelate, auxiliary bishop of Turin (2002–2006), bishop of Alghero-Bosa (2006–2010) and Alba Pompeia (2010–2015).
- 3 July:
  - Yervant Gianikian, 84, film director and architect.
  - Bruno Lucchesi, 99, Italian-American sculptor.
- 4 July:
  - Adriano Caprioli, 90, Roman Catholic prelate, bishop of Reggio Emilia–Guastalla (1998–2012).
  - Fausto Delle Chiaie, 82, artist.
  - Sergio Pini, 90, footballer (Mantova, Vicenza).
- 5 July:
  - Tiziana Aristarco, 66, film and television director.
  - Giovanni Fanello, 87, footballer (Catanzaro, Reggiana, 1960 Olympics).
- 6 July: Erminio Gius, 88, psychologist and Capuchin priest.
- 7 July: Beniamino Di Giacomo, 90, footballer (Napoli, Inter Milan, national team).
- 8 July: Luigi Colombo, 88, journalist and television presenter.
- 9 July: Dino Bruni, 94, road racing cyclist, Olympic silver medallist (1952).
- 11 July:
  - Domenico Adinolfi, 80, boxer and actor.
  - Peppino di Capri, 86, singer-songwriter ("Un grande amore e niente più", "Champagne") and pianist.
  - Bruno Torri, 94, film critic and historian.
- 12 July: Fernando Scarpa, 79, footballer (Potenza).
- 13 July: Giuseppe Galtarossa, 88, footballer (Treviso, Mestrina, Prato).
- 14 July: Neliana Tersigni, 81, journalist (TG3).
- 26 July: Angelo Romero, 86, baritone and actor.
- 30 July: Franco Baresi, 66, footballer (AC Milan, national team), world champion (1982).

=== August ===
- 19 August – Michele Sensi-Contugi, 44, dual citizen of Italy and Ecuador, businessman, Director General of the National Intelligence Center (CNI) (2024-2026).
- 26 August – Domenico Papalia, 81, mobster ('Ndrangheta).

=== September ===
- 1 September – Enzo Bianchi, 83, Roman Catholic friar, founder of the Bose Monastic Community.
- 11 September –
  - Emma Bonino, 78, minister of foreign affairs (2013–2014), senator (2008–2013, 2018–2022) and twice MEP.
  - Raffaele Costa, 90, deputy (1976–2006), minister of transport (1993–1994) and twice of health.
- 15 September – Vitantonio Lovallo, 112, supercentenarian.
- 16 September – Pietro Soddu, 97, deputy (1983–1994) and three-time president of Sardinia.
- 30 September – Peppino Mazzullo, 100, actor and voice actor (Topo Gigio).

=== October ===
- 7 October: Stefania Corna, 35, volleyball player (Volley Bergamo, Club Italia, national team).
- 12 October – Giorgio Bracardi, 93, actor (Banana Joe, La portiera nuda, Being Twenty) and comedian.

=== November ===
- 2 November: Nadia Santini, 73, chef (Dal Pescatore).
- 5 November: Alessandro Staccioli, 95, Roman Catholic prelate, vicar apostolic of Luang Prabang (1968–1975) and auxiliary bishop of Siena–Colle di Val d'Elsa–Montalcino (1975–1990).
- 6 November: Roberto Cervellati, 92, physicist and explorer.
- 10 November: Ryan Ghietti, 37, rugby league player (Northern Pride, national team).
- 15 November: Antonio Franco, 89, Roman Catholic prelate, apostolic nuncio to Ukraine (1992–1999), the Philippines (1999–2006) and Israel (2006–2012).
- 21 November:
  - Paolo Bulgari, 89, fashion designer, chairman of Bulgari (since 1984).
  - Giovanni De Gennaro, 78, chief of the Polizia di Stato (2000–2007) and chairman of Leonardo S.p.A. (2013–2020).
