= Tarquinio =

Tarquinio is both an Italian masculine given name and a surname. Notable people with the name include:

== Given name ==
- Tarquinio Angiolin (1928–2012), Italian rower
- Tarquinio Ligustri (1564–c. 1620), Italian painter
- Tarquinio Merula (1595–1665), Italian composer, organist, and violinist
- Tarquinio Provini (1933–2005), Italian motorcycle road racer
- Octávio Tarquínio de Sousa (1889–1959), Brazilian historian and author

== Surname ==
- Lucio Tarquinio (1949–2025), Italian politician
- Marco Tarquinio (born 1958), Italian journalist and politician
- Sergio Tarquinio (1925–2026), Italian painter and comics artist

== See also ==
- Tarquin
- Tarquinius
