= Giovanni Bolzoni =

Giovanni Bolzoni may refer to:

- Giovanni Bolzoni (composer) (1841–1919), Italian composer
- Giovanni Bolzoni (footballer, born 1905), Italian footballer with Inter Milan in the 1930s
- Giovanni Bolzoni (footballer, born 1937), Italian footballer with Sampdoria, Genoa and Napoli in the 1950s and 1960s on List of S.S.C. Napoli players
