= Marco Casagrande (sculptor) =

Italian sculptor (1804–1880)

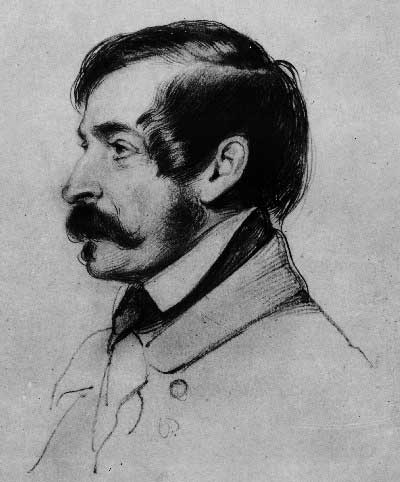
- Portrait of Marco Casagrande
- Born: September 18, 1804; Miane, Veneto Italy
- Died: February 5, 1880 (aged 75); Cison di Valmarino, Veneto
- Occupation: Sculptor

Marco Casagrande (18 September 1804 – 5 February 1880) was an Italian sculptor, active in Veneto and Hungary. His name is often overlooked because his works, in neoclassical style, all of excellent workmanship, are often mistakenly attributed by most to Zandomeneghi, his teacher, or to his most illustrious fellow countryman, Canova.

== Biography ==
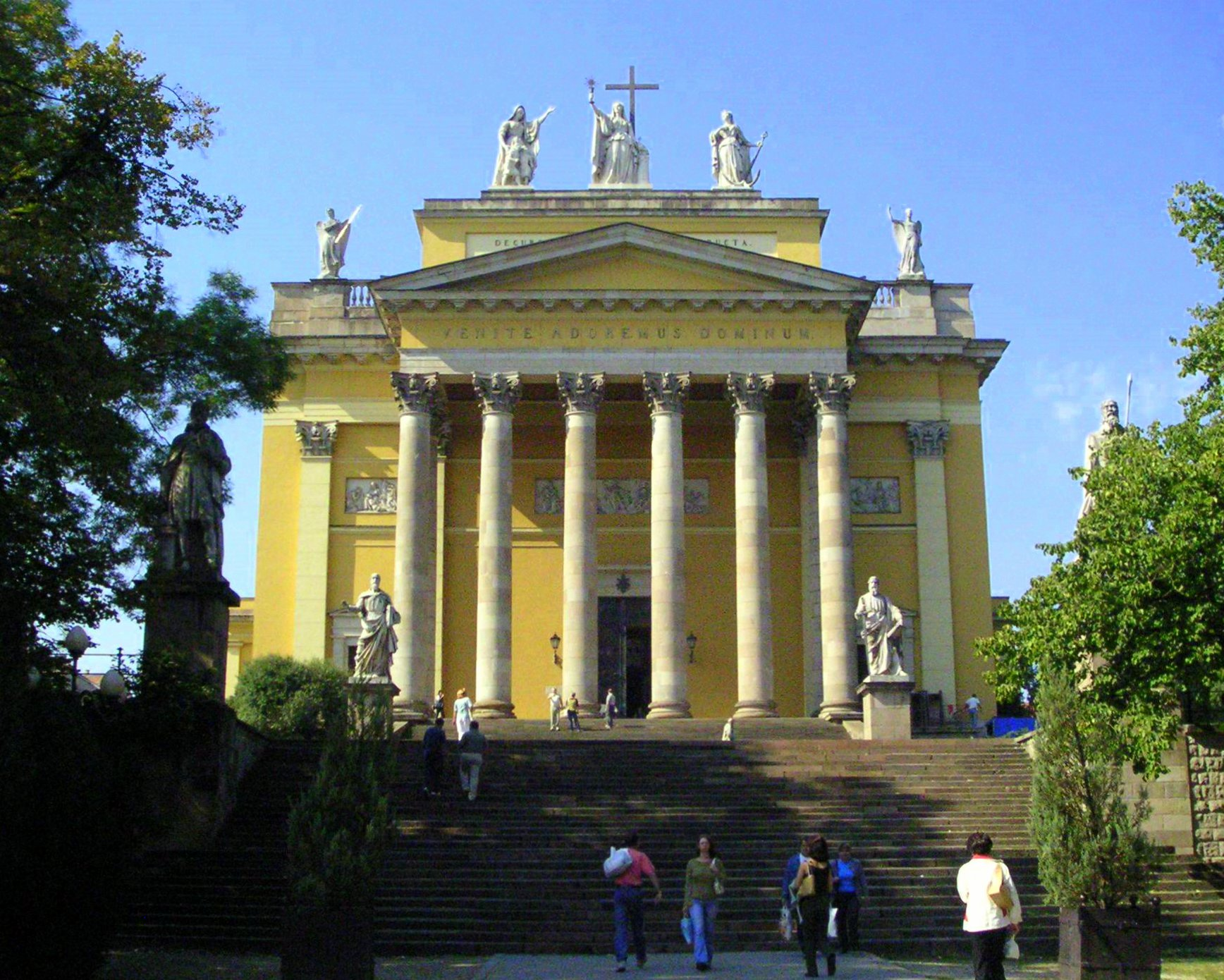
The Cathedral di Eger with the sculptural group of Casagrande

Marco Casagrande was born in Campea di Miane into a peasant family. Thanks to the generosity of the lords of Campea, Giovambattista, Vettore and Bartolomeo Gera, he was enrolled at a very young age at the Academy of Fine Arts in Venice, a pupil of the master Luigi Zandomeneghi. In 1825 he won the 1st prize of the Brera Academy with the opera Angelica and Medoro. During this period he was commissioned to make a statue of Pauline Bonaparte by the Marshal of the Empire Macdonald, Duke of Taranto, and a bust of Antonio Canova by his patron Bartolomeo Gera.

In the city of Ferrara in 1829 he created the sculptural group depicting Fortune propitiates Hydraulics and created Abundance for the tympanum of Palazzo Camerini and other works.

In 1830, at the age of 26, he was made an honorary member of the Academy of Fine Arts in Venice. After completing his studies, he went and sculpted in Conegliano (Villa Gera), Treviso (Palazzo Bortolan) and Padua. In Venice, the turning point: Patriarch John Ladislaus Pyrker, the future archbishop of Eger, after having commissioned him to make a statue of St. John the Baptist, entrusted him with the sculptural decoration of the cathedral of Eger, in Hungary.

From 1833 to 1836, the year of its inauguration, it decorated the façade and interior of the Eger Cathedral, designed by the Hungarian architect József Hild. Here he created the first Italian school of sculpture in Hungary, where he called Venetian and Magyar stonemasons. During this period, many local nobles also called him to decorate their palaces, in Pest, Eger and other towns. The Basilica of Esztergom In 1841 he was called by the Archbishop of Esztergom, Primate of Hungary, to decorate the city's basilica. In 1845 he married Mária Kovács, daughter of the tailor of the archbishopric of Eger.

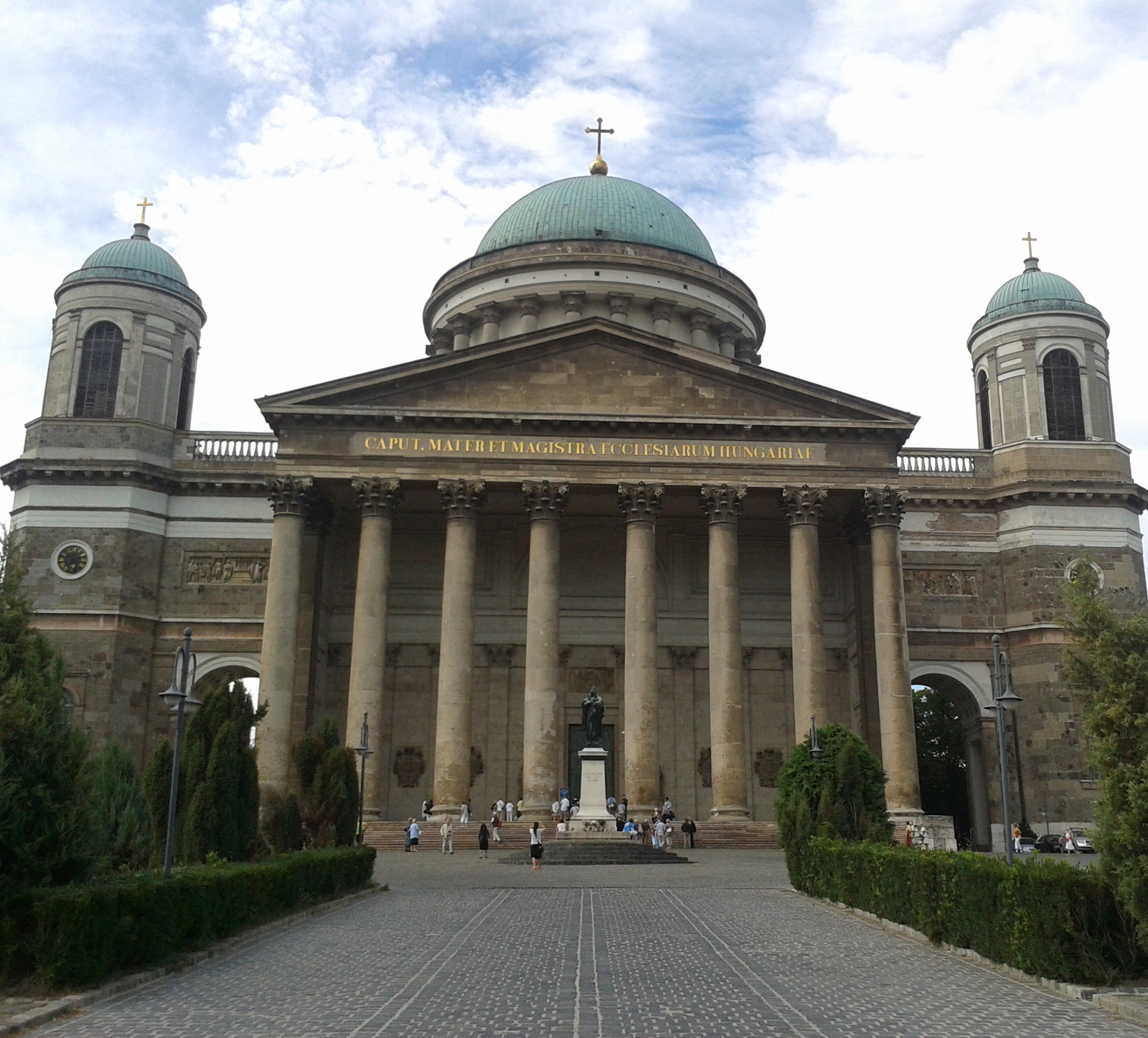
Esztergom Basilica

In 1847 the patron saint Monsignor Pyrker died and the following year the benefactor Bartolomeo Gera. Due to the uprisings of 1848, which soon involved the whole of Europe, he was reluctantly forced to leave Hungary after 15 years to return to the Italian peninsula, where, however, the first war of independence was raging. Here he settled first in Valmareno and then in Cison di Valmarino. He carried out works for the church of Cison di Valmarino, for the Cathedral of Conegliano, for Palazzo Berton in Feltre, for the archdeaconal church of Agordo, for the cathedral of Serravalle, for the church of Moriago della Battaglia and for that of Lutrano, as well as various busts of nobles and priests.

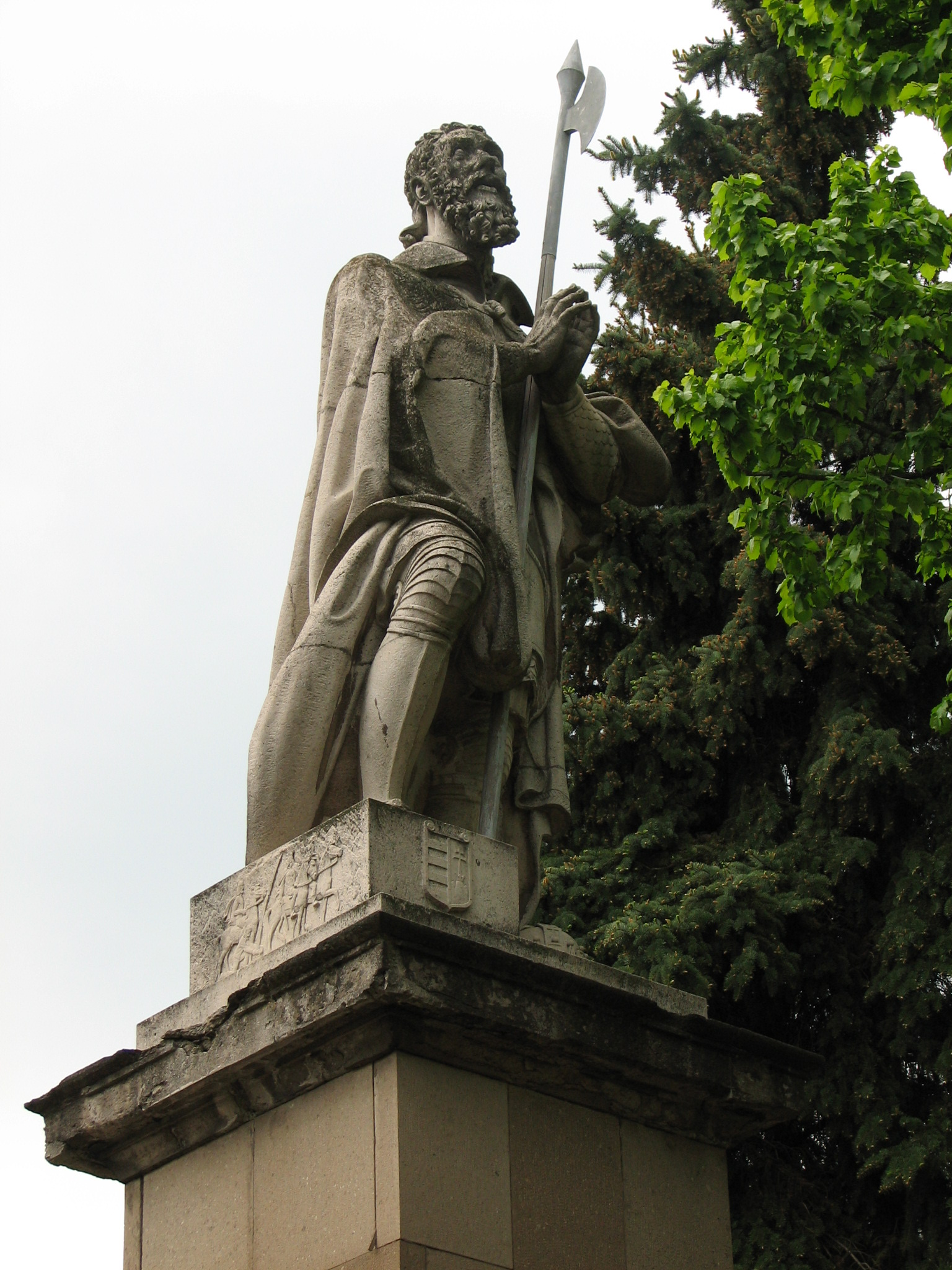
Statue of Saint Ladislaus (Marco Casagrande, 1836). - Eszterházy Square, Eger 2008, Hungary

In 1856 he was recalled to Hungary and was commissioned to paint four huge statues for the city's basilica in Esztergom. The basilica was inaugurated with a solemn feast, attended by Emperor Franz Joseph I of Habsburg, who praised the work of the Italian artist. But suddenly, and probably because he was considered a subversive because of his departure in 1848 for a Veneto close to independence from the Austro-Hungarian Empire, after this work nothing more was commissioned to him in Magyar land. This forces him to return to his homeland again. In 1860 he began the project of a small temple near Cison di Valmarino, in the style of the Canovian Gipsoteca, with the help of the local population. In these years, however, the discouragement for the few commissions received and the aftermath of an old work accident made him seriously ill.

He died at his home in Cison di Valmarino on 5 February 1880.

== Bibliography ==
- Tombor, Tibor (1980). Marco Casagrande scultore trevigiano. Treviso: Ed. Marton.
- L. Pusztai-Guido Sinopoli (1978). "Casagrande, Marco". Dizionario Biografico degli Italiani (in Italian). Vol. 21: Caruso–Castelnuovo. Rome: Istituto dell'Enciclopedia Italiana. ISBN 978-88-12-00032-6. marco-casagrande.
