= Cathedral Basilica of Eger =

Coordinates: 47.8994°N 20.3733°E

Cathedral Basilica of St. John the Apostle
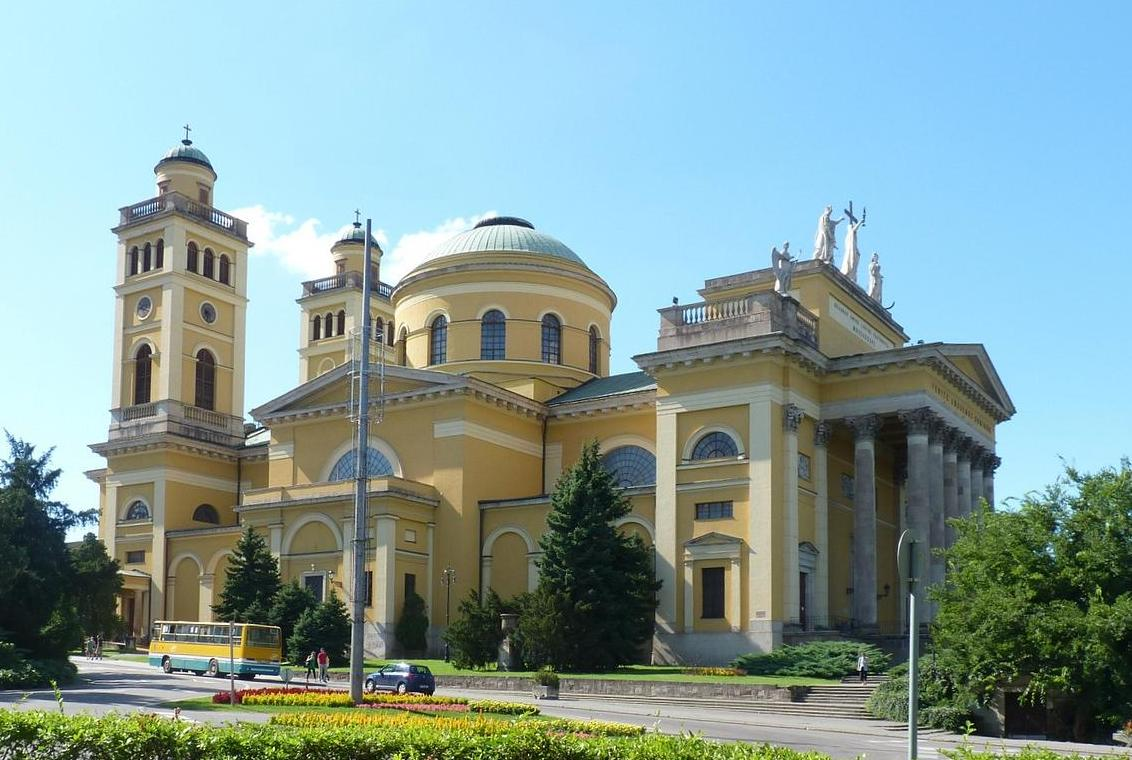
- Cathedral Basilica of St. John the Apostle
- Location: Eger
- Country: Hungary
- Denomination: Roman Catholic Church

The Cathedral Basilica of St. John the Apostle or more formally Metropolitan Cathedral Basilica of St. John the Apostle and Evangelist, St. Michael and the Immaculate Conception (Hungarian: Szent János apostol és evangélista, Szent Mihály főangyal, Szeplőtelen Fogantatás főszékesegyház bazilika) also called Eger Cathedral is a religious building affiliated with the Catholic Church that functions as the cathedral of the Archdiocese of Eger, located in the city of Eger, in Hungary.

Archbishop János László Pyrker, who came to Eger in 1827, commissioned József Hild to design the cathedral. It was built between 1831 and 1836 and consecrated in 1837, and it is considered the second largest church building in Hungary.

The cathedral is a basilica with three naves. In the middle between the nave and chancel to the east is the transept. The dome of the cathedral, 40 meters above ground, is lavishly decorated. At the rear are the two bell towers. The portal on the eastern porch is designed like a Greek temple. The monumental entrance is decorated with statues by the Venetian sculptor Marco Casagrande: Saints Stephen and Ladislaus beside the staircase, Saints Peter and Paul, and the figures of Faith, Hope and Charity above the portico. The facade is supported by Corinthian columns that reach a height of 17 meters, and the tympanum carries a Latin inscription meaning "Come, let us adore the Lord".

The decoration of the interior took about 120 years to complete. The organ was built in 1864 by Ludwig Mooser of Salzburg and enlarged in 1912, when its mechanical action was replaced with a pneumatic one.

== Gallery ==
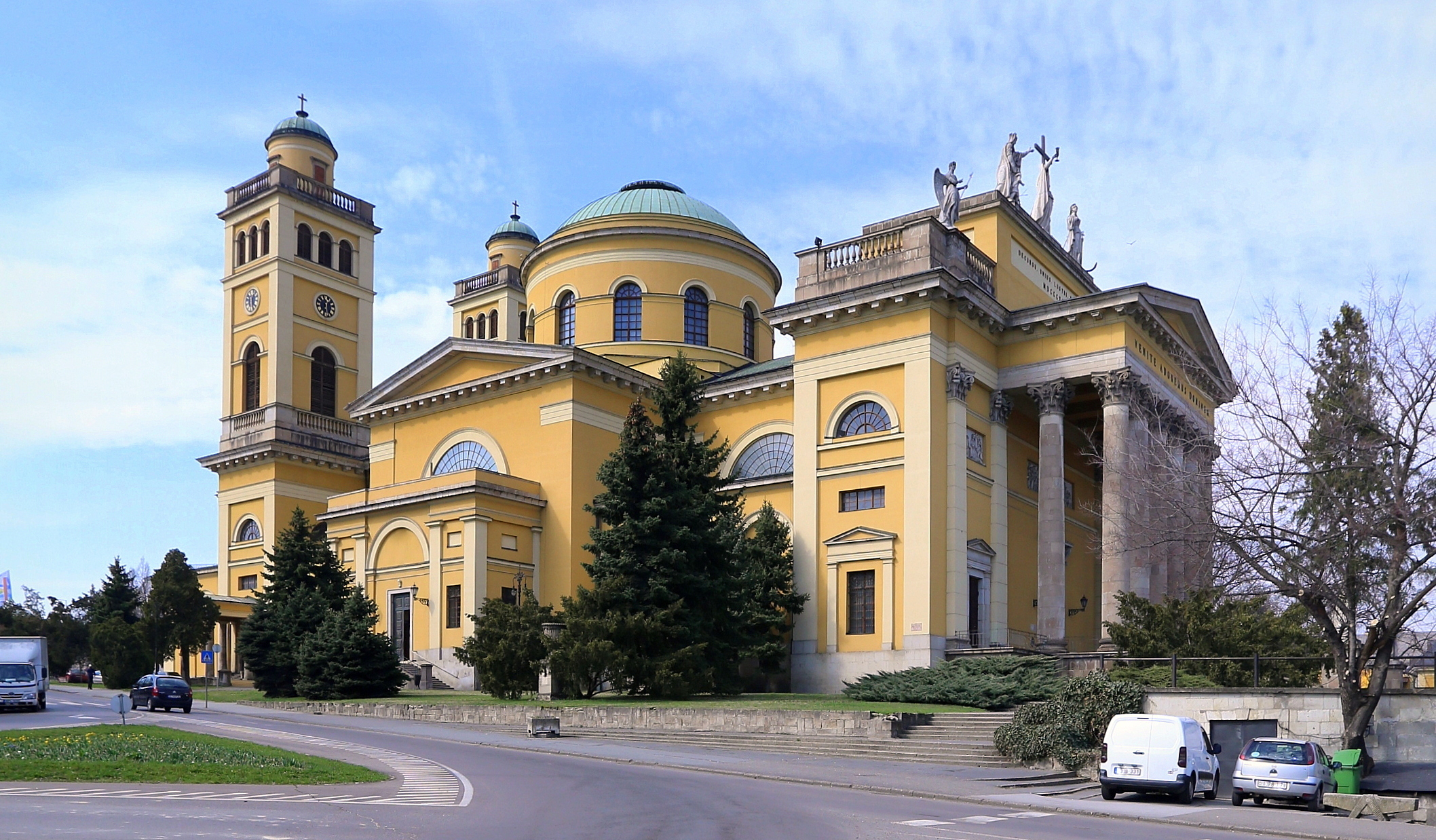

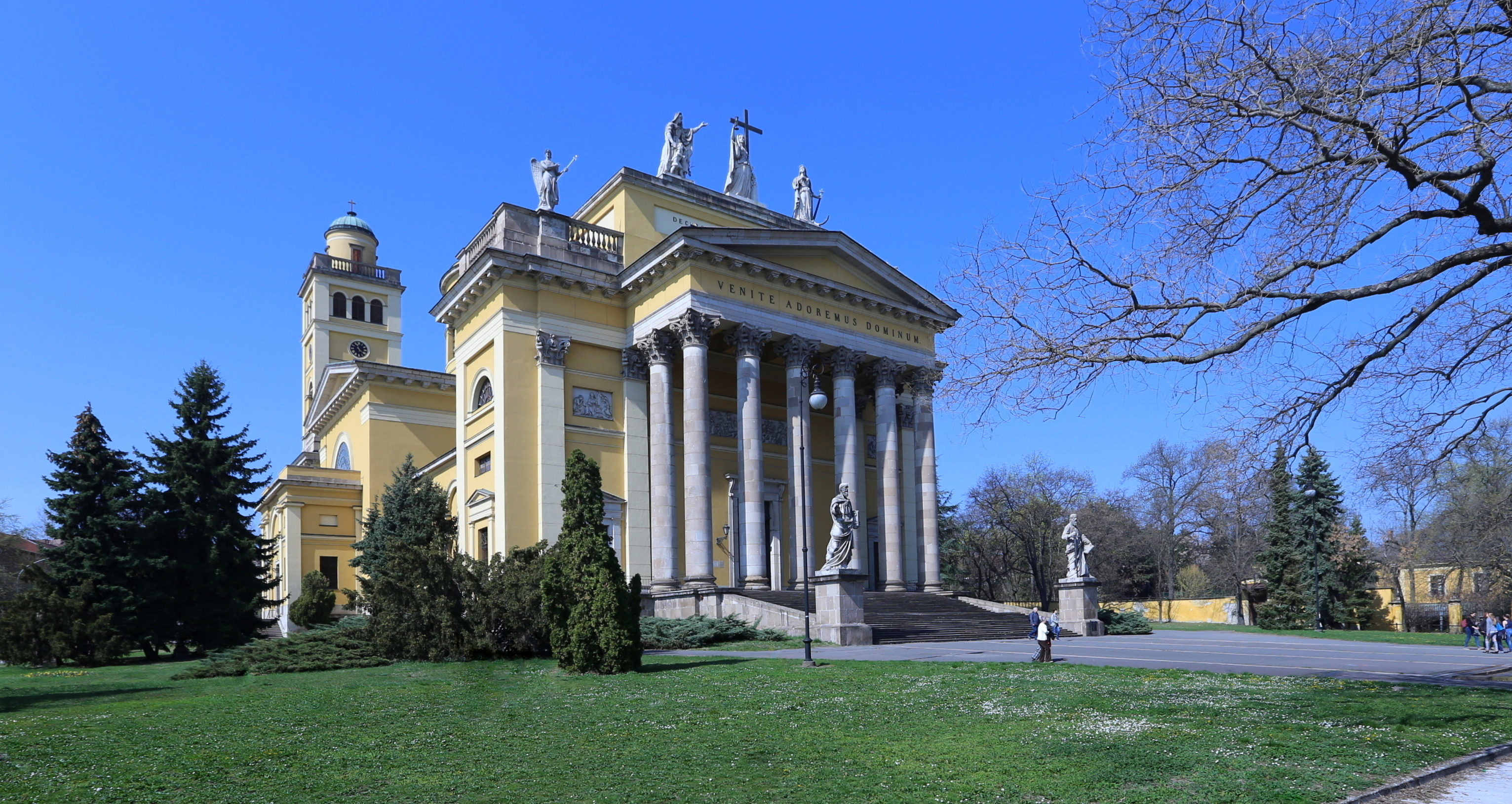

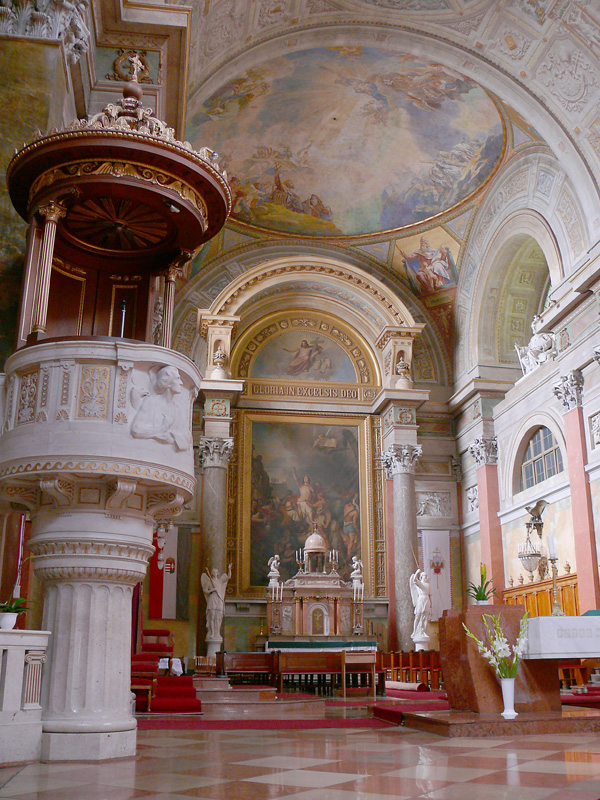

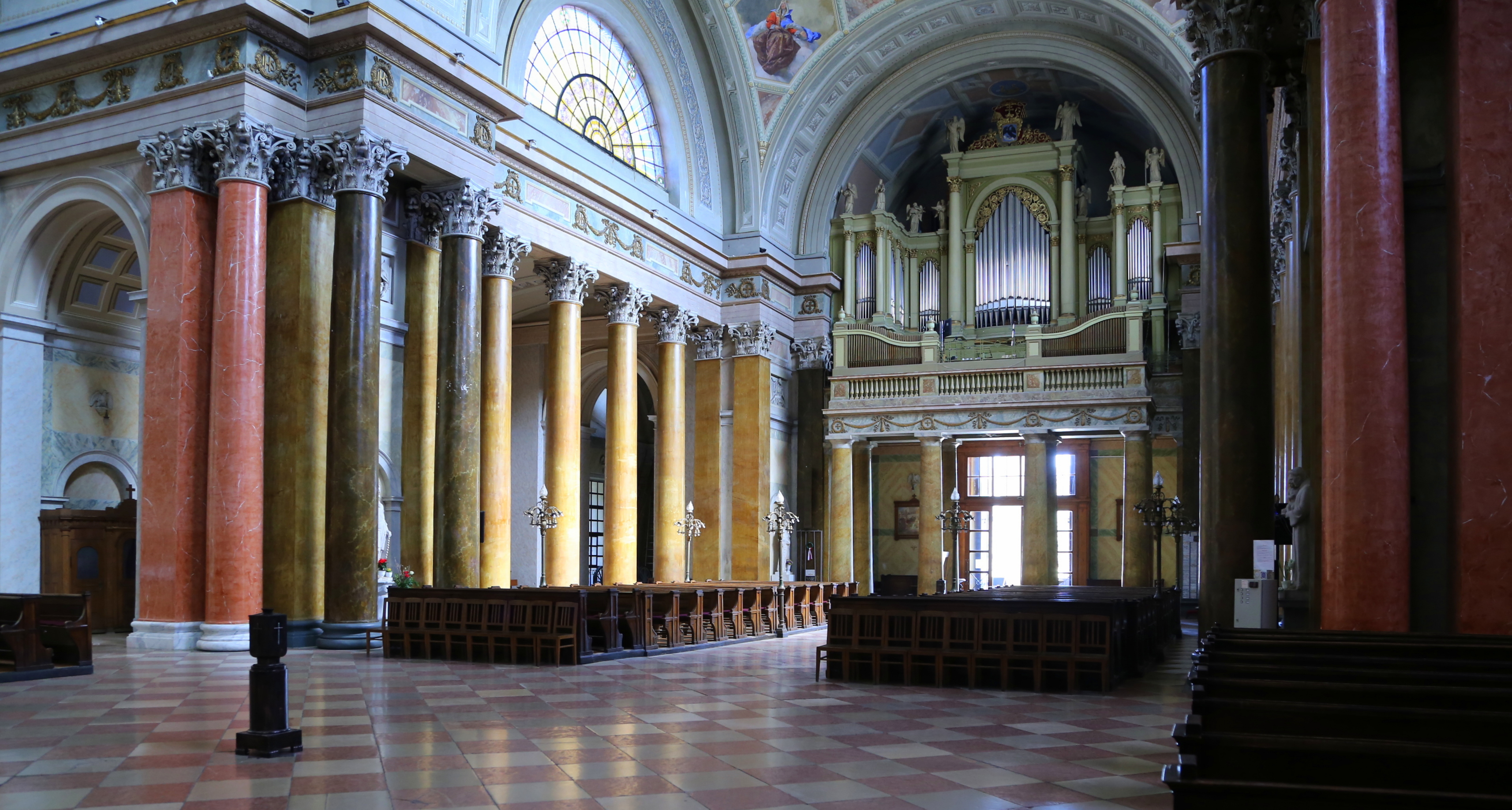

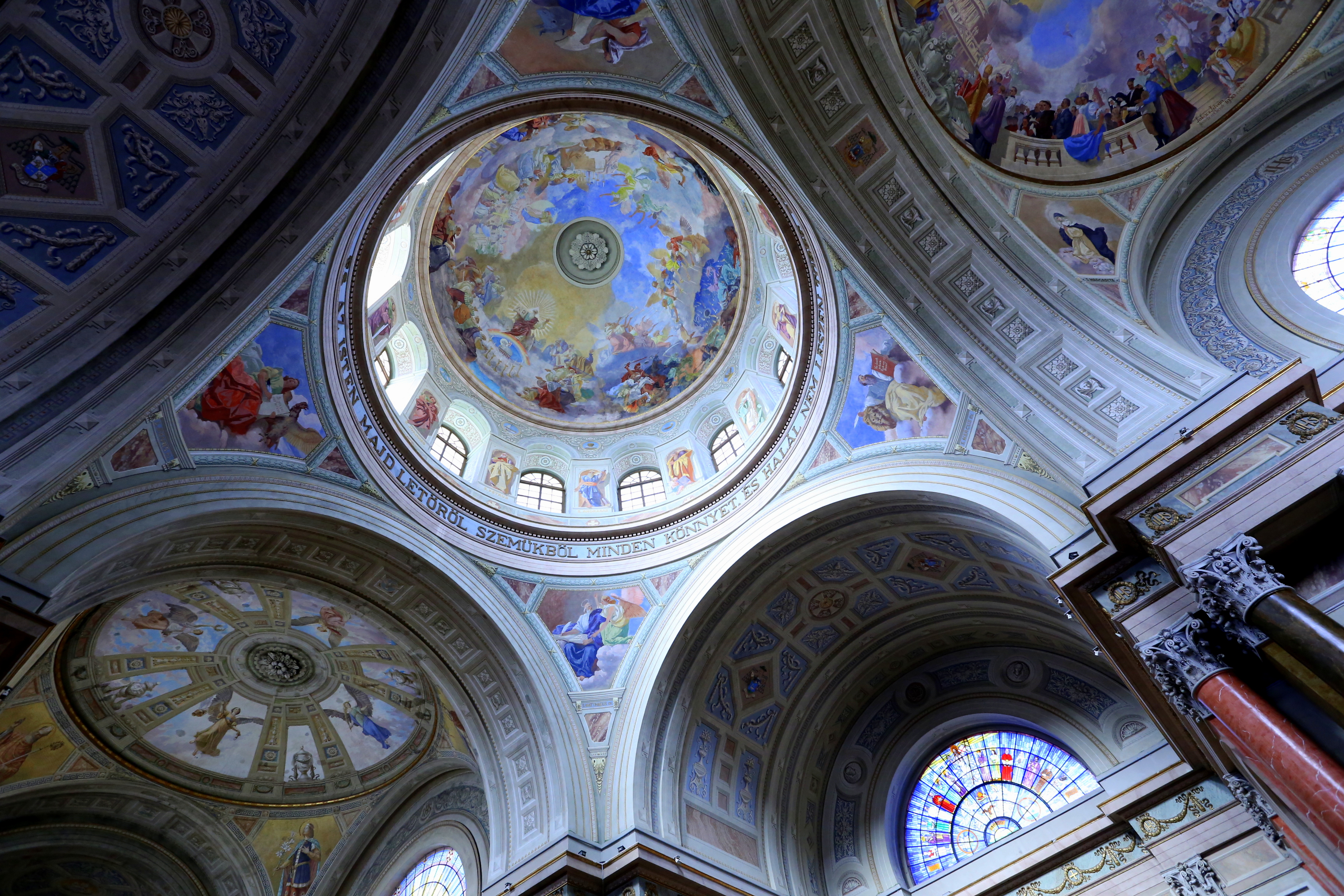

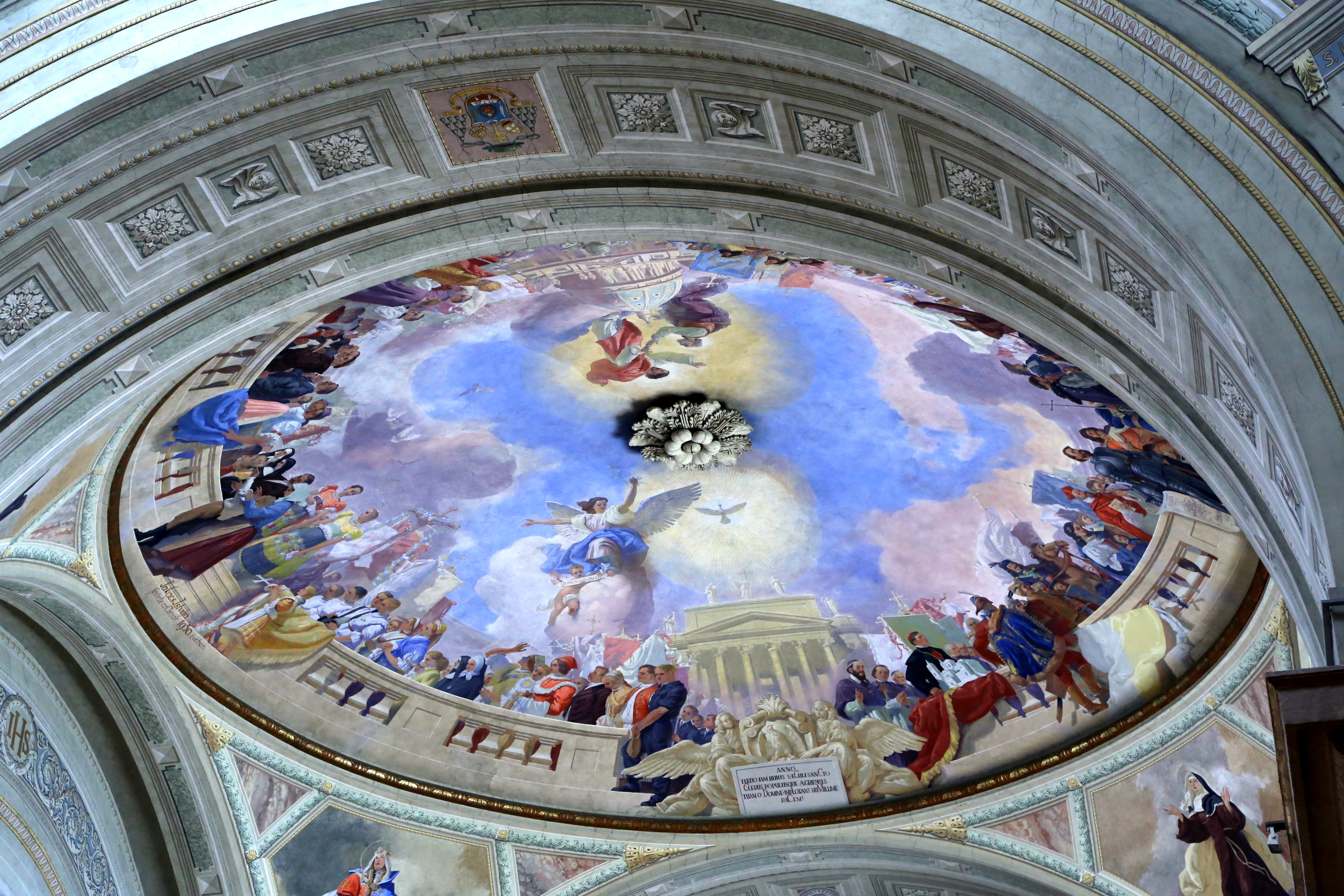

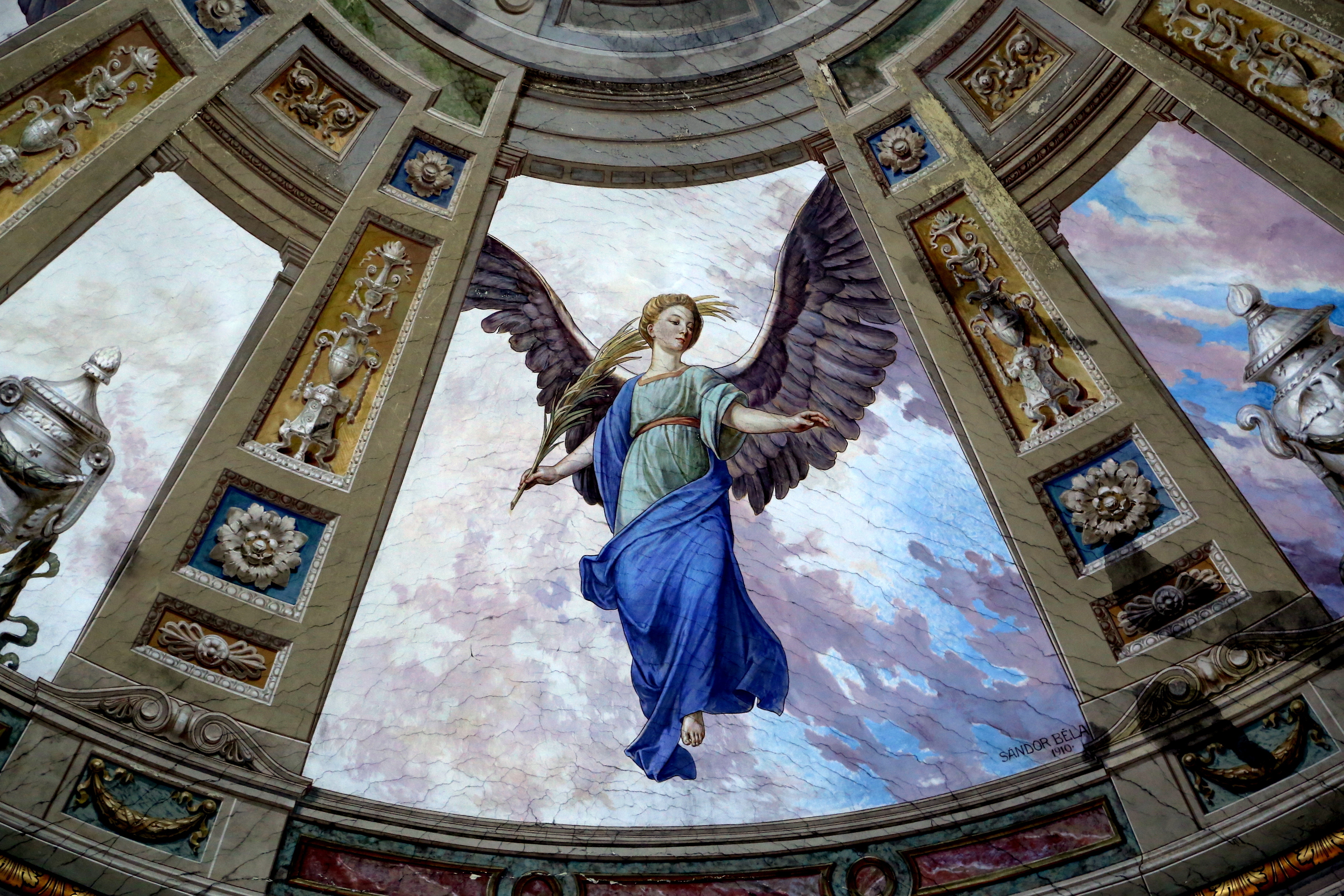

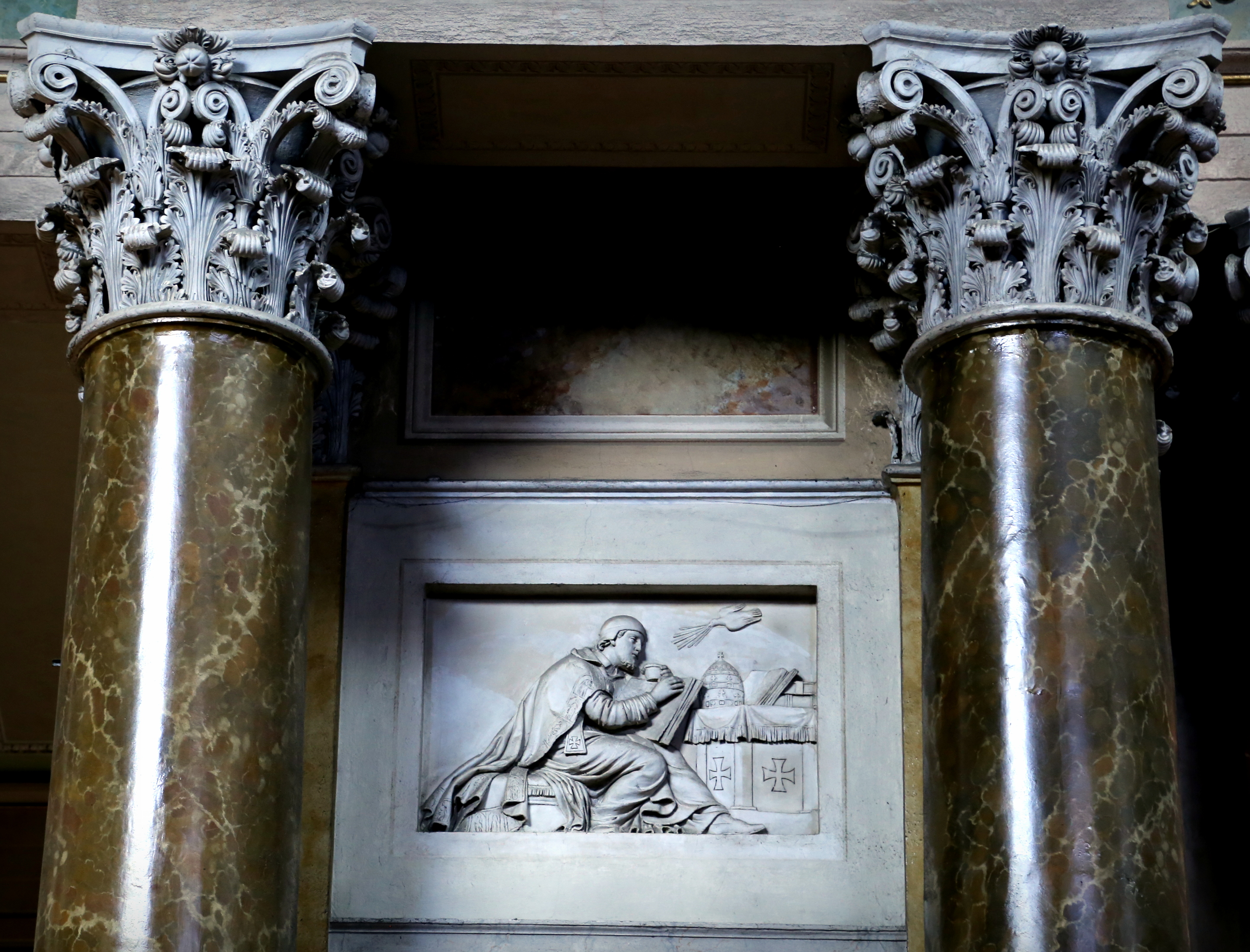

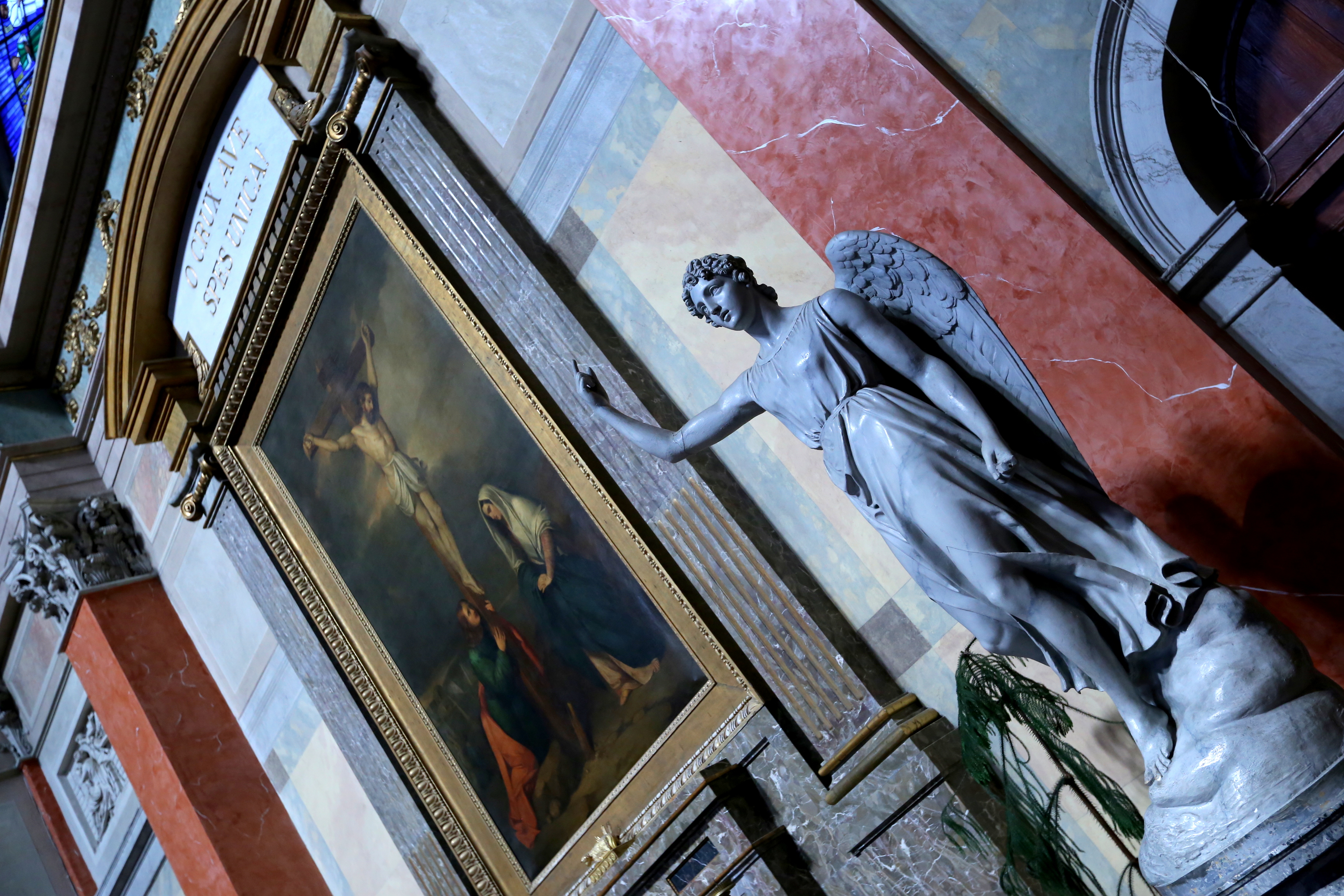

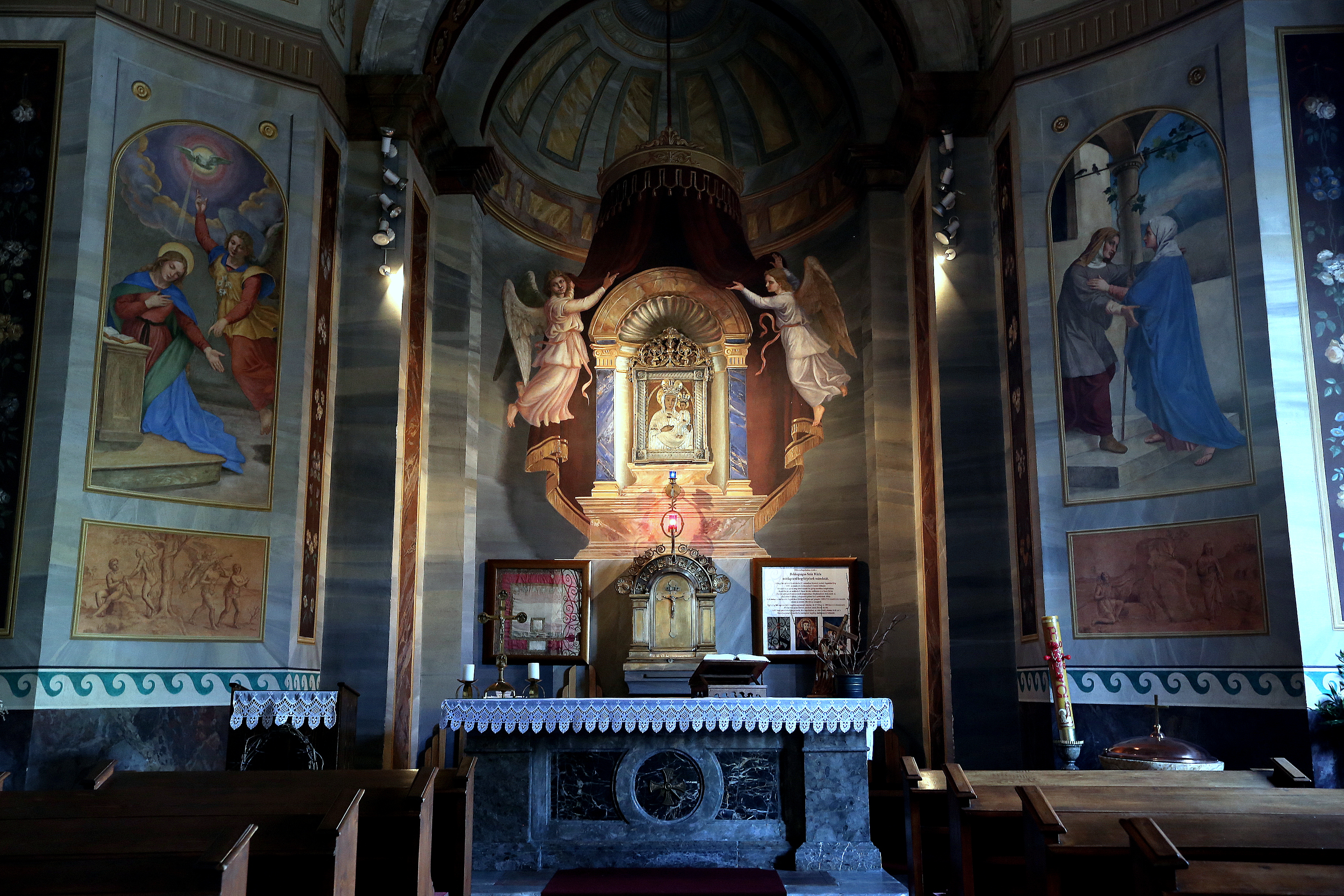

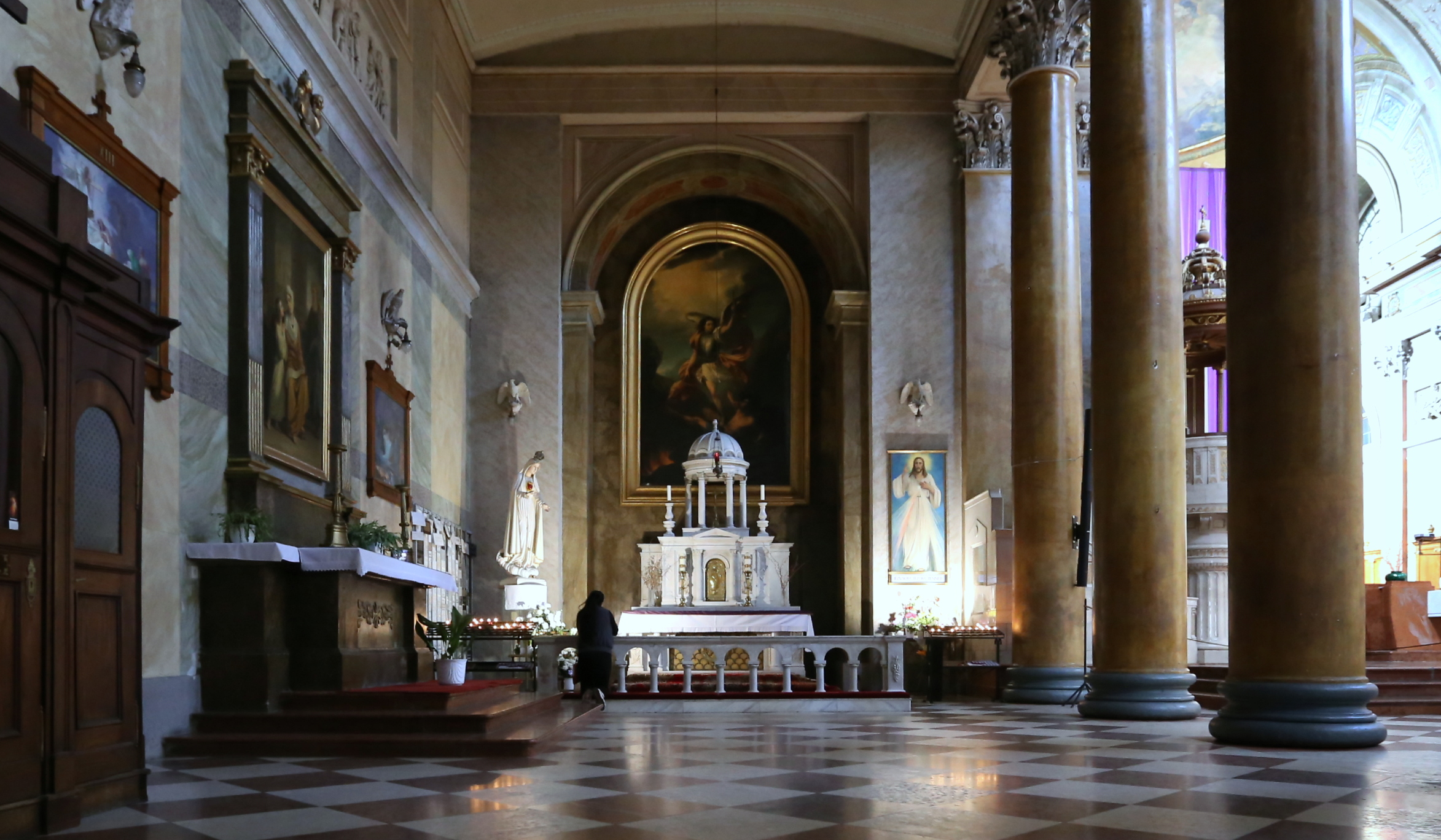

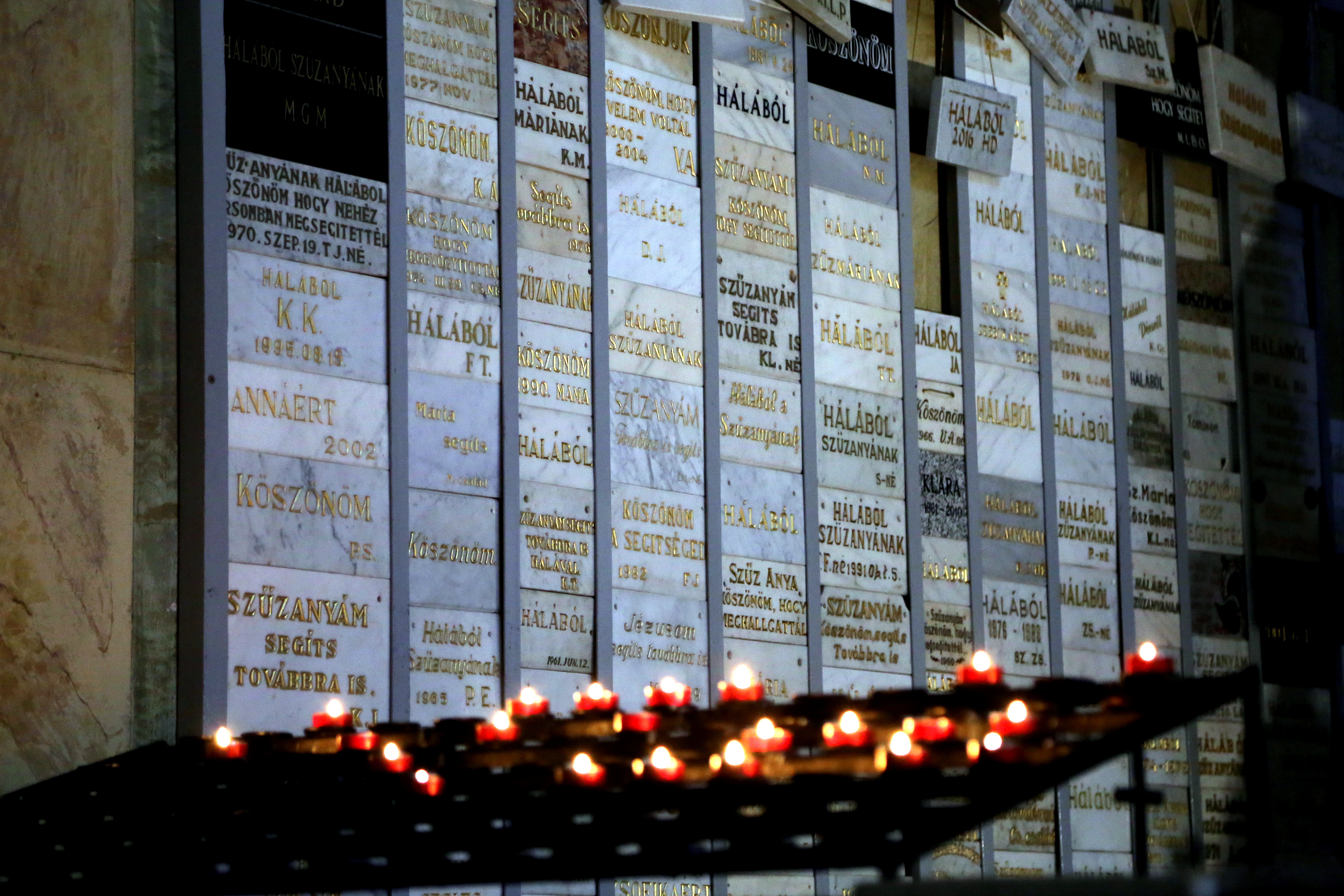

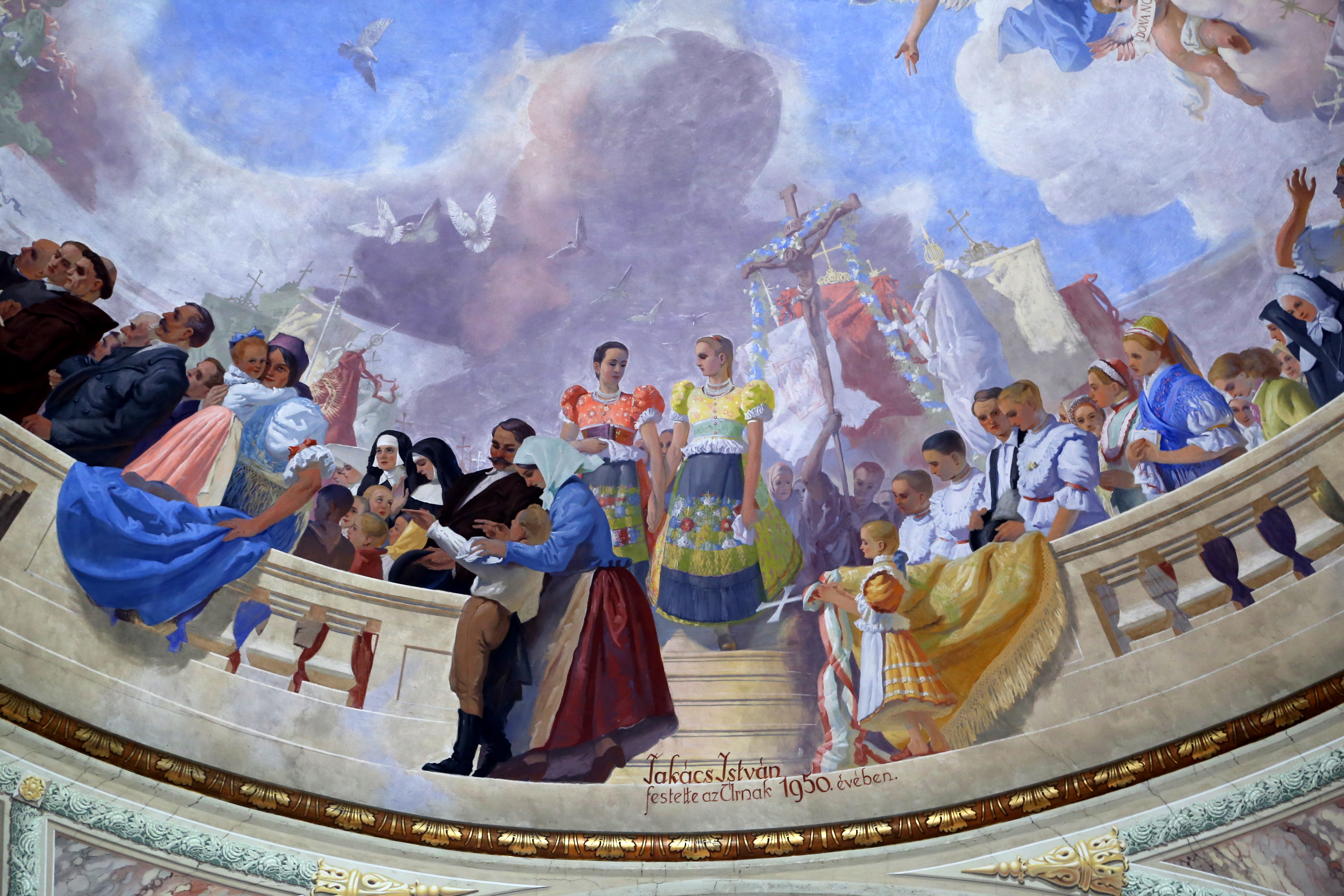

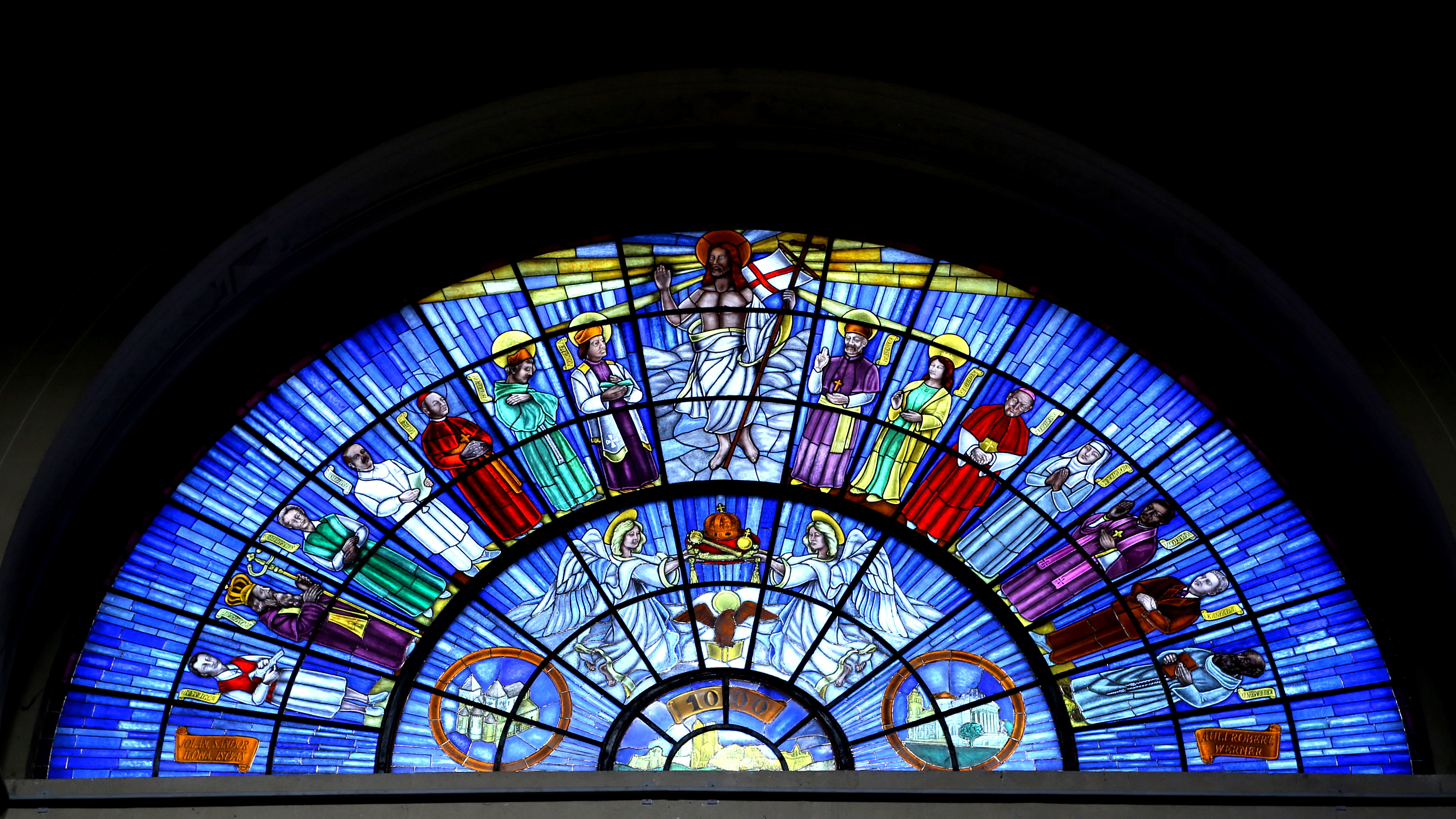

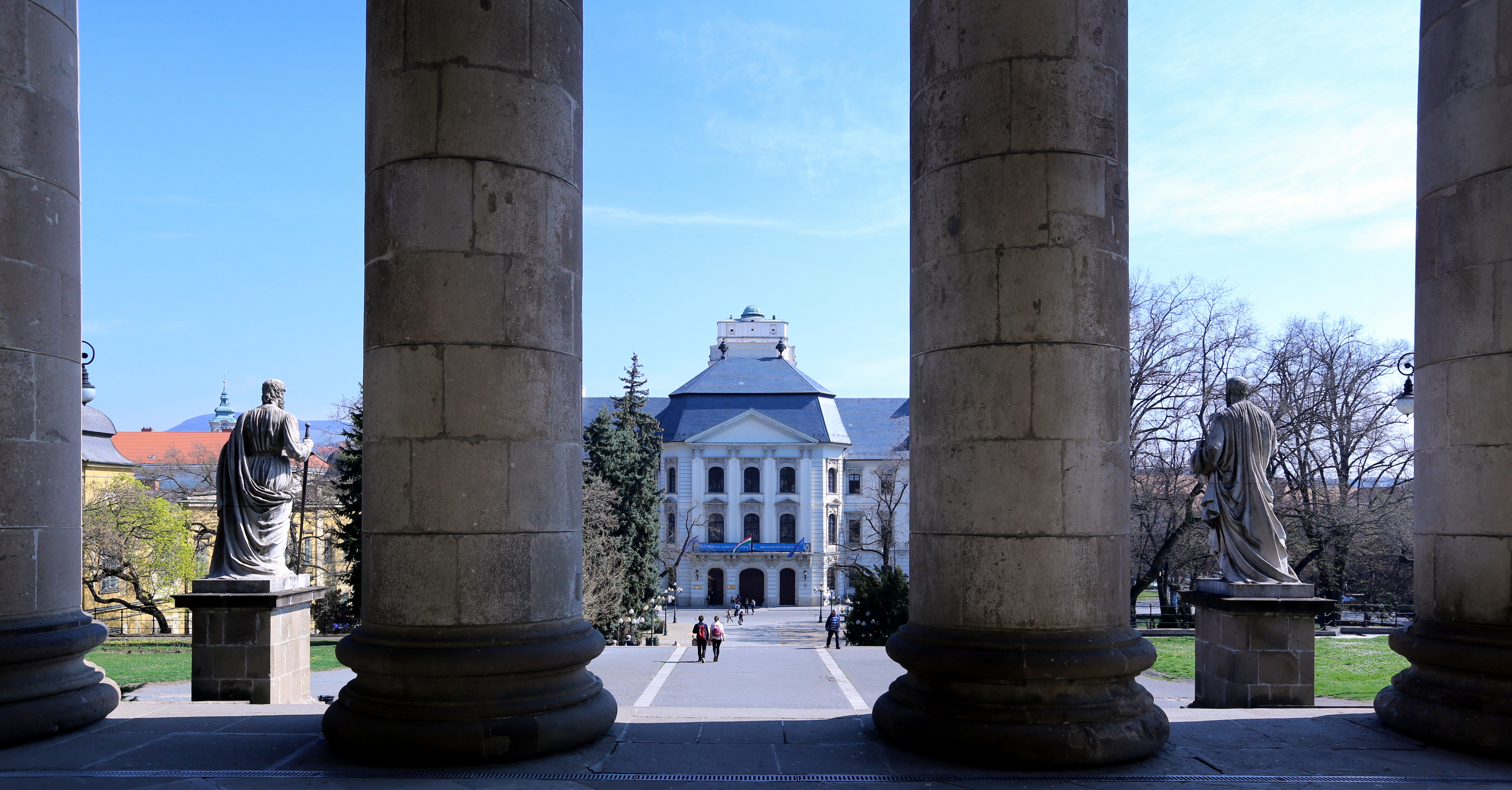

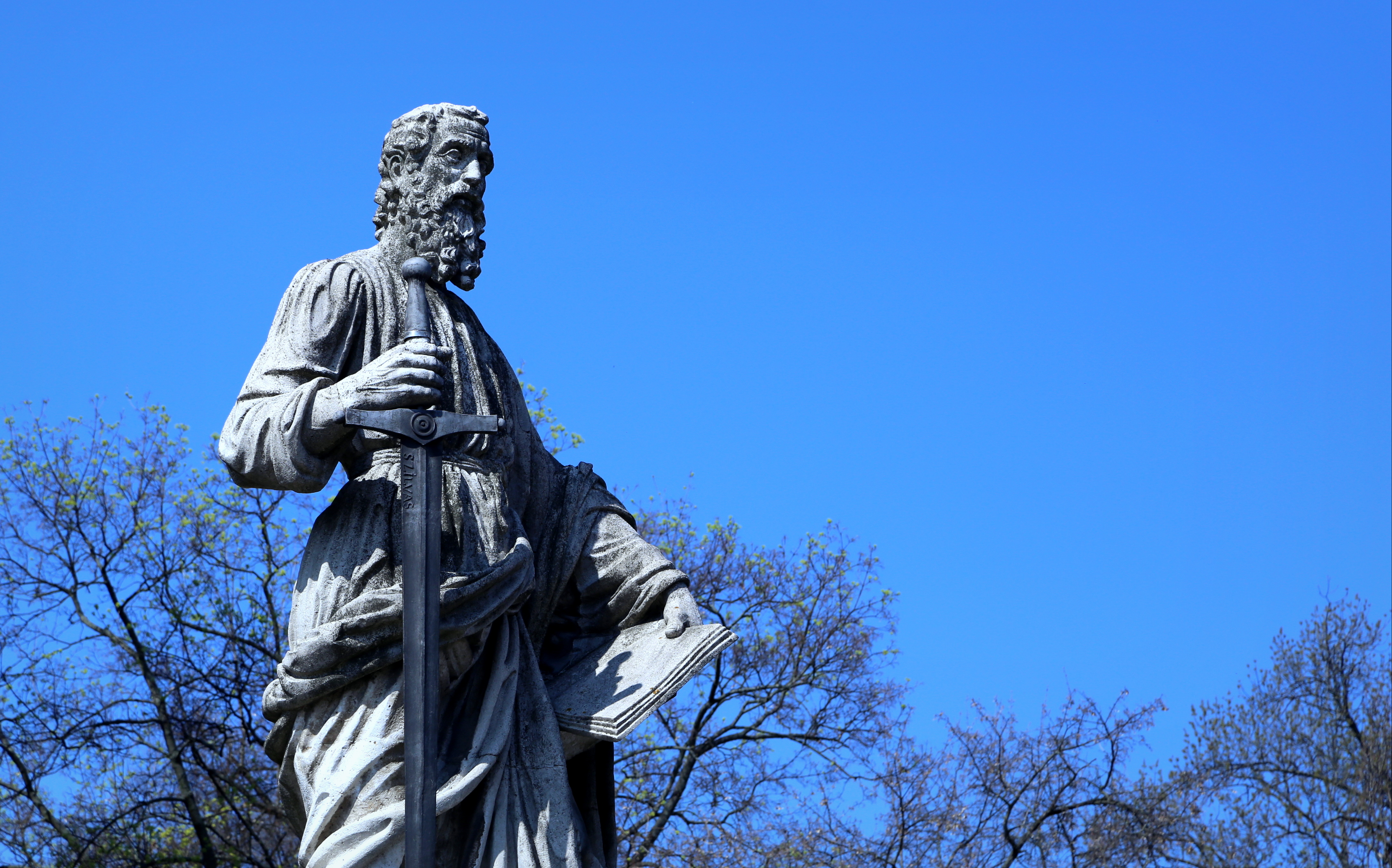

== See also ==
- Roman Catholicism in Hungary
- List of cathedrals in Hungary
