= 2027 in Italy =

- Decades: 2000s; 2010s; 2020s; 2030s
- See also: History of Italy; Timeline of Italian history; List of years in Italy

The following is a list of events of the year 2027 in Italy.

== Events ==
=== Predicted and scheduled ===
- 8–14 November – 2027 Women's Ice Hockey World Championships Division I Group A in Milan
- No later than 22 November – 2027 Italian general election (Note: While elections in Italy are customarily held on a Sunday or Sunday and Monday, there is no constitutional requirement to do so; the latest possible date for a general election to be held is the 70th day following the expiration of the Parliament's five-year term.)

== Holidays ==
- 1 January – New Year's Day
- 6 January – Epiphany
- 28 March – Easter Sunday
- 29 March – Easter Monday
- 25 April – Liberation Day
- 1 May – International Workers' Day
- 2 June – Republic Day
- 15 August – Assumption Day
- 1 November – All Saints' Day
- 8 December – Immaculate Conception
- 25 December – Christmas Day
- 26 December – Saint Stephen's Day
