= Angelo Gugel =

Italian papal assistant (1935–2026)

- Born: 27 April 1935; Miane, Italy
- Died: 15 January 2026 (aged 90); Rome, Italy
- Occupation: Papal assistant

Angelo Gugel (27 April 1935 – 15 January 2026) was an Italian papal assistant.

== Biography ==
Gugel was born in Miane, Italy on 27 April 1935. He was a Maggiordomo (Chamberlain) for Pope John Paul I, Pope John Paul II, and the beginning of Pope Benedict XVI's pontificate.

Gugel died on 15 January 2026 in Rome, at the age of 90.
