= Tarkin =

Tarkin may refer to:

- Grand Moff Tarkin, a fictional character in the Star Wars franchise
  - Star Wars: Tarkin, a 2014 novel about the character
- Talarican (fl. 8th century), or Tarkin, Scottish saint
- Tarkin, an Ogg video codec

== See also ==
- Tarkine, a wilderness area in Tasmania, Australia
- Tarquin (disambiguation)
