= Domenico Adinolfi =

Italian boxer (1946–2026)

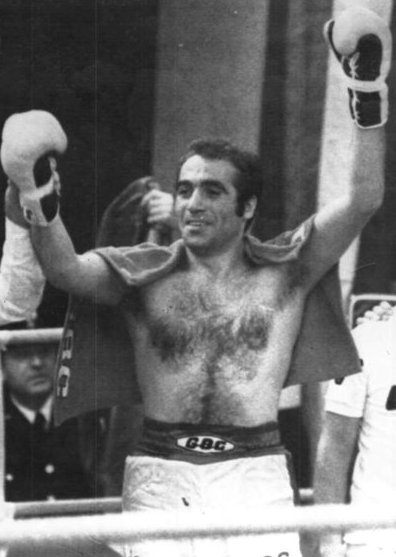
- Adinolfi in 1971

Personal information
- Born: 20 June 1946 Ceccano, Italy
- Died: 11 July 2026 (aged 80) Frosinone

Boxing career
- Weight class: Light heavyweight Heavyweight

Boxing record
- Total fights: 64
- Wins: 51
- Win by KO: 26
- Losses: 9
- Draws: 3
- No contests: 1

Domenico Adinolfi (20 June 1946 – 11 July 2026) was an Italian boxer.

His career spanned from 1969 to 1982, during which he recorded 51 wins, 26 wins by KO, and 9 losses.

Adinolfi died on 11 July 2026, at the age of 80.
