= Miane =

- Comune
- Comune di Miane
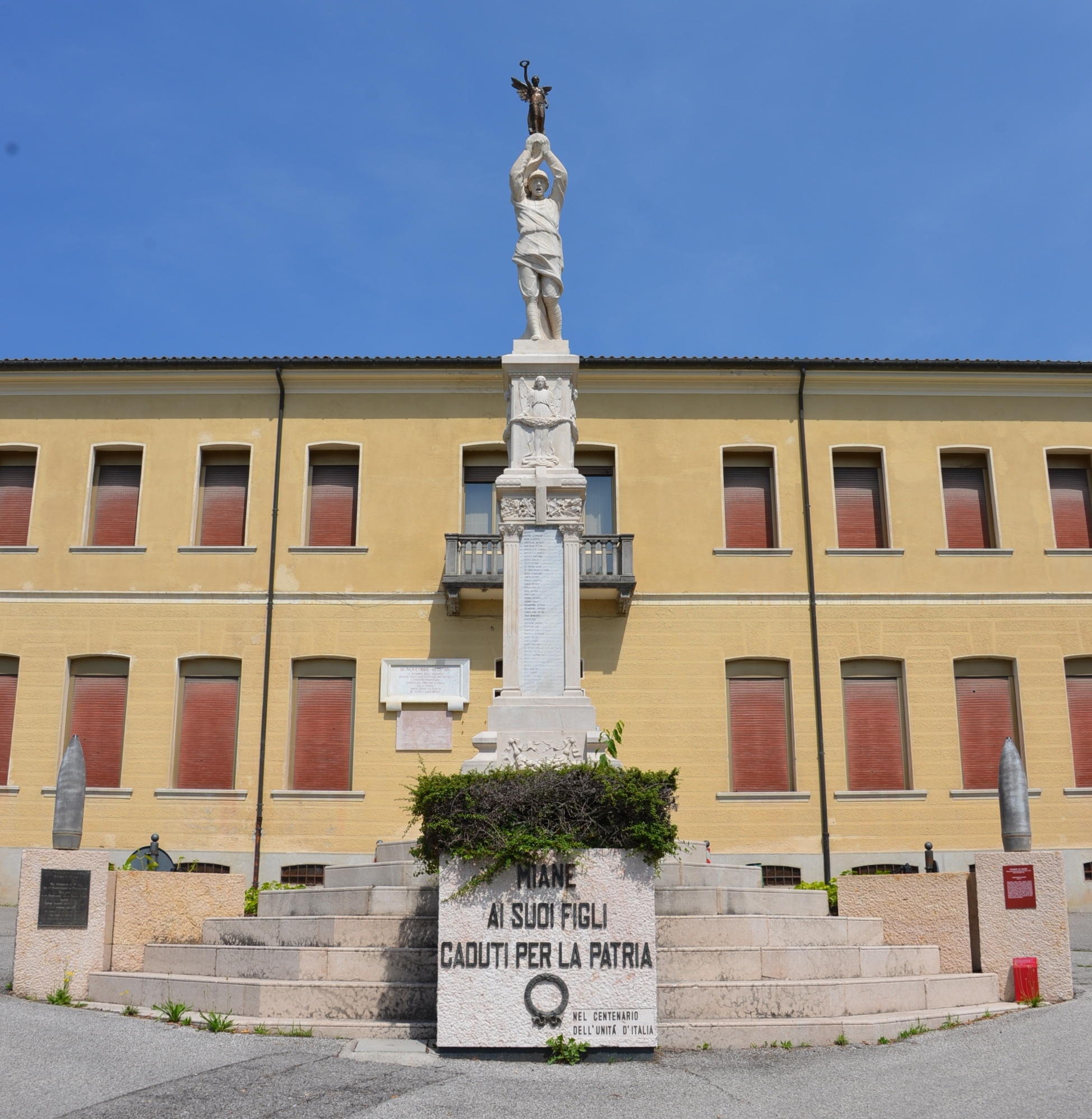

- Location within Italy Location within Veneto
- Coordinates: 45°57′N 12°6′E
- Country: Italy
- Region: Veneto
- Province: Province of Treviso (TV)
- Frazioni: Combai, Campea, Premaor

Area
  - Total: 30.9 km^{2} (11.9 sq mi)
- Elevation: 259 m (850 ft)

Population (Dec. 2022)
  - Total: 3,123
  - Density: 101/km^{2} (262/sq mi)
- Demonym: Mianesi
- Time zone: UTC+1 (CET)
  - Summer (DST): UTC+2 (CEST)
- Postal code: 31050
- Dialing code: 0438
- Website: Official website

Miane is a comune (municipality) in the Province of Treviso in the Italian region Veneto, located about 60 kilometres (37 miles) northwest of Venice and about 35 kilometres (22 miles) northwest of Treviso. As of 31 December 2022, it had a population of 3,123 and an area of 30.9 square kilometres (11.9 sq mi).

The municipality of Miane contains the frazioni (subdivisions, mainly villages and hamlets) Combai, Campea, and Premaor. Miane borders the municipalities of Farra di Soligo, Follina, Valdobbiadene, and Borgo Valbelluna.

== Geography ==
The territory of Miane is located in the northern area of the province, near the border with Belluno. The territory is therefore characterized by the presence of reliefs of various sizes, from the modest moraines of the central-southern area to the Belluno pre-Alps of the northern area, which here culminate with the 1,438 m above sea level of Mount Cimon. However, the reliefs alternate with valleys and plateaus on which the main inhabited centers have arisen.

== History ==
It seems that in Miane, with the spread of Christianity, there was a place of worship to which the faithful from the surrounding areas referred, so that the town found itself representing a center of spiritual cohesion even before a commercial one or administrative.

The descent of the barbarians (4th century AD approximately) disturbed the order that the Romans had given to the area, but left the ecclesiastical division into parishes and chapels intact: hence the birth of the Parish of S Maria di Miane, which was below Treviso, and the chapels of Visnà, Vergoman, Combai, Campea and Premaor.

With the organization of the following years these chapels were called rules and each of them was placed under the government of a meriga, supported by two jurors; the parish church, however, became the center of the municipality.

Until the fall of the Serenissima this order remained unchanged; during the Napoleonic period first and then the Austrian one, Miane was governed by a municipal Deputation.

When Veneto was annexed to Italy, except for the twenty years of fascism during which it was held by a Podestà, Miane took on the same form of administration that it presents today.

== Monuments and places of interest ==
The center of Miane contains numerous buildings of historical interest.

=== Religious architecture ===
==== Archpriest Church ====
The archpriest's church (1878), which exhibits a marble high altar and a tabernacle of great value, as well as paintings by Egidio Dall'Oglio, Bianchi, Bellucci and Balliana. The church is accompanied by the bell tower which, as was discovered in recent times following a renovation, was born in the fifteenth century as a lookout tower, evidently part of a more complex defensive system, and was subsequently transformed into a bell tower. It is very similar to that of the church of Saints Peter and Paul in Soligo (Farra di Soligo).

==== Sanctuary of the Madonna del Carmine ====
In the Visnà area there is the sanctuary of the Madonna del Carmine, consecrated in 1824 and has always been a destination for devout pilgrimages. The church of San Pietro (1300) was the original archpriest's church of Miane; it remained for years in a state of abandonment until it was restored.

==== The legend of the "Capitel Vecio" ====
A legendary place is the "Capitel Vecio": it is said that, perhaps in 1100, the Madonna appeared to a group of shepherds asking them to build a small temple; this would have been the original nucleus of the subsequent Arcipretale, nucleus which was recognized in a chapel whose dating, however, remains problematic, since it seems that the frescoes decorating the walls are prior to the Marian statuette sculpted by a shepherd immediately after the apparition. Furthermore, subsequent pictorial superimpositions have only increased the confusion around the time of origin of the temple, however amplifying the aura of charm, suggestion and mystery that surrounds it.

=== Civil architecture ===
==== Villa Gera Minucci Bellati ====
In front of the parish church of Campea there is a noble villa with simple and elegant lines, Villa Gera Minucci Bellati, rich in furnishings and works of art and the Villa Bellati also dates back to the seventeenth century, located on the hill overlooking the town of Premaor.

=== Natural areas ===
In the Casera Faganello area there is a large Fraxinus excelsior, whose circumference is 3.8 metres, for a height of 26; it is classified in the list of approximately 22,000 Italian monumental trees protected by the forestry guard and one of the 16 located in the province of Treviso.

== Infrastructure and transport ==
Miane is connected to the center of Valdobbiadene by the MOM bus line n.121: Valdobbiadene, Miane, Follina, Cison di Valmarino.

== Demographic evolution ==
Historical population

Year	Pop.	±%
1861	?	—
1871	3,596	—
1881	3,477	−3.3%
1901	3,978	+14.4%
1911	4,625	+16.3%

Year	Pop.	±%
1921	4,482	−3.1%
1931	4,207	−6.1%
1936	3,738	−11.1%
1951	3,943	+5.5%
1961	3,564	−9.6%

Year	Pop.	±%
1971	3,231	−9.3%
1981	3,309	+2.4%
1991	3,322	+0.4%
2001	3,416	+2.8%

Source: Data from ISTAT

== Foreign ethnic groups and minorities ==
As of 31 December 2022, there were 294 foreigners resident in the municipality, or 9.4% of the population. Below are the most significant groups:

1. Morocco 73
2. North Macedonia 55
3. Romania 51
4. Kosovo 12
5. Brazil 11
6. Senegal 11
7. Albania 10

== Economy ==
Agriculture is still practiced: vines, orchards, cereals, fodder and vegetables are grown. Breeding is also practiced, especially of cattle, pigs and poultry. The industries present operate in the textile, mechanical, food and clothing sectors, alongside companies involved in woodworking and dairy production. In relation to tertiary activities, the commercial network satisfies the needs of the community.

== Culture ==
=== Events ===
- January: Feast of Saint Anthony the Abbot (Vergoman);
- April: Prosecco D.O.C. Wine Exhibition (Miane);
- May: "È Verdiso", Exhibition of Verdiso wine (Combai);
- June: Alpini Festival at the "Posa Puner" refuge;
- July: Feast of the "Madonna del Carmine" (Miane);
- August: San Rocco Festival (Miane)
- September: Alpine huts in Miane;
- October: Chestnut Festival (Combai);
- November: Feast of San Martino (Premaor); Choral Review (Miane);
- December: Feast of St. Andrew (Campea);
- Every two years (odd years): International Festival of Music and dance, organized by "AltaMarca Festival": international festival of music and folklore;
- Every Wednesday: weekly market (Miane).

Since 2002, Miane, thanks to the production of the renowned "Prosecco" and the typical "Verdiso", has been part of the National Association of Wine Cities.

The Municipality of Miane is part of the "central area" Prosecco Hills of Conegliano and Valdobbiadene, included in the list of World Heritage Sites of UNESCO in 2019.

== Notable people ==
- Marco Casagrande (Miane, 1804 – Cison di Valmarino, 1880), sculptor.
