= Tullio Možina =

Italian-born Slovenian guitarist and singer (1935–2026)

Tullio Možina (17 May 1935 – 24 June 2026) was an Italian-born Slovenian guitarist and singer.

== Life and career ==
Možina was born on 17 May 1935 in Trieste. He established the Trieste National Ensemble in the 1970s. He also founded the ensemble Ano ur'co al' pej dvej. He was a member of the Lords Dance Ensemble, the Miramar Orchestra, the Mix Orchestra and the Red Star Big Band.

He was a member of the expert committee of the Festival of National Popular Music in Števerjan for several years.

Mozina died on 24 June 2026, at the age of 91.
