= Natale Carlotto =

Italian politician (1931–2026)

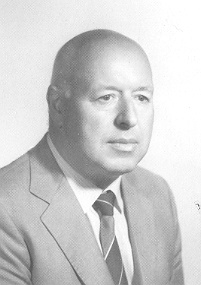

Member of the Senate of the Republic of Italy for Piedmont
- In office 2 July 1987 – 14 April 1994

Member of the Chamber of Deputies of Italy
- In office 2 July 1976 – 1 July 1987

Personal details
- Born: 18 April 1931 Ceva, Italy
- Died: 3 January 2026 (aged 94) Cuneo, Italy
- Party: DC
- Occupation: Trade unionist

Natale Carlotto (18 April 1931 – 3 January 2026) was an Italian politician. A member of Christian Democracy, he served in the Chamber of Deputies from 1976 to 1987 and in the Senate of the Republic from 1987 to 1994.

Carlotto died in Cuneo on 3 January 2026, at the age of 94.
