= Cosimo Scaglioso =

Italian politician (1936–2026)

Member of the Senate of the Republic of Italy for Tuscany
- In office 15 April 1994 – 8 May 1996

Personal details
- Born: 4 October 1936 San Marzano di San Giuseppe, Italy
- Died: 5 January 2026 (aged 89) Siena, Italy
- Party: Progressisti
- Education: University of Florence
- Occupation: Teacher

Cosimo Scaglioso (4 October 1936 – 5 January 2026) was an Italian politician. A member of the Alliance of Progressives, he served in the Senate of the Republic from 1994 to 1996.

Scaglioso died in Siena on 5 January 2026, at the age of 89.
