= Angelo Romero =

Italian baritone (1940–2026)

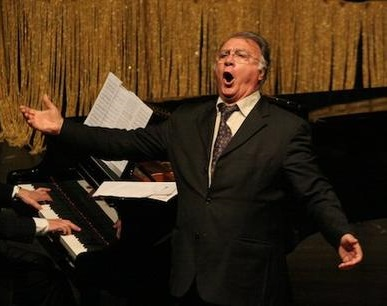
- Romero in 2016

Background information
- Born: 30 May 1940; Cagliari, Sardinia, Italy
- Died: 26 July 2026 (aged 86) Assemini, Sardinia, Italy
- Genre: Opera
- Occupations: Opera singer; Actor
- Years active: 1966–2008

Angelo Romero (30 May 1940 – 26 July 2026) was an Italian baritone and actor. He performed over 150 roles across major international stages, including La Scala, Metropolitan Opera, and Royal Opera House.

== Life and career ==
Angelo Romero was born in Cagliari, Sardinia on 30 May 1940. He trained and worked as an actor.

Romero started his career in 1966. He got a role in one of Claudio Monteverdi works called L'Orfeo. He then performed another 150 operatic roles across Europe. He established himself as a specialist in Gioachino Rossini and bel canto comic repertoire. He earned a popular fame for his portrayal of Figaro in Gioachino Rossini's The Barber of Seville. It was stated that he performed the show for over 600 times. Romero performed regularly at major venues including La Scala in Milan, the Metropolitan Opera in New York, the Royal Opera House in London, the Teatro Colón in Buenos Aires, and the Arena di Verona. He also sang with many famous singers such as Mirella Freni, Plácido Domingo, and Alfredo Kraus.

He collaborated with director Luchino Visconti and appeared on film as Alfio in one of the Francis Ford Coppola films called The Godfather Part III in 1990. He taught at Quartu Music Academy in Sardinia until his retirement.

Romero died in Assemini, Sardinia on 26 July 2026, at the age of 86.
