= Francesco Paolo Casavola =

Italian judge (1931–2026)

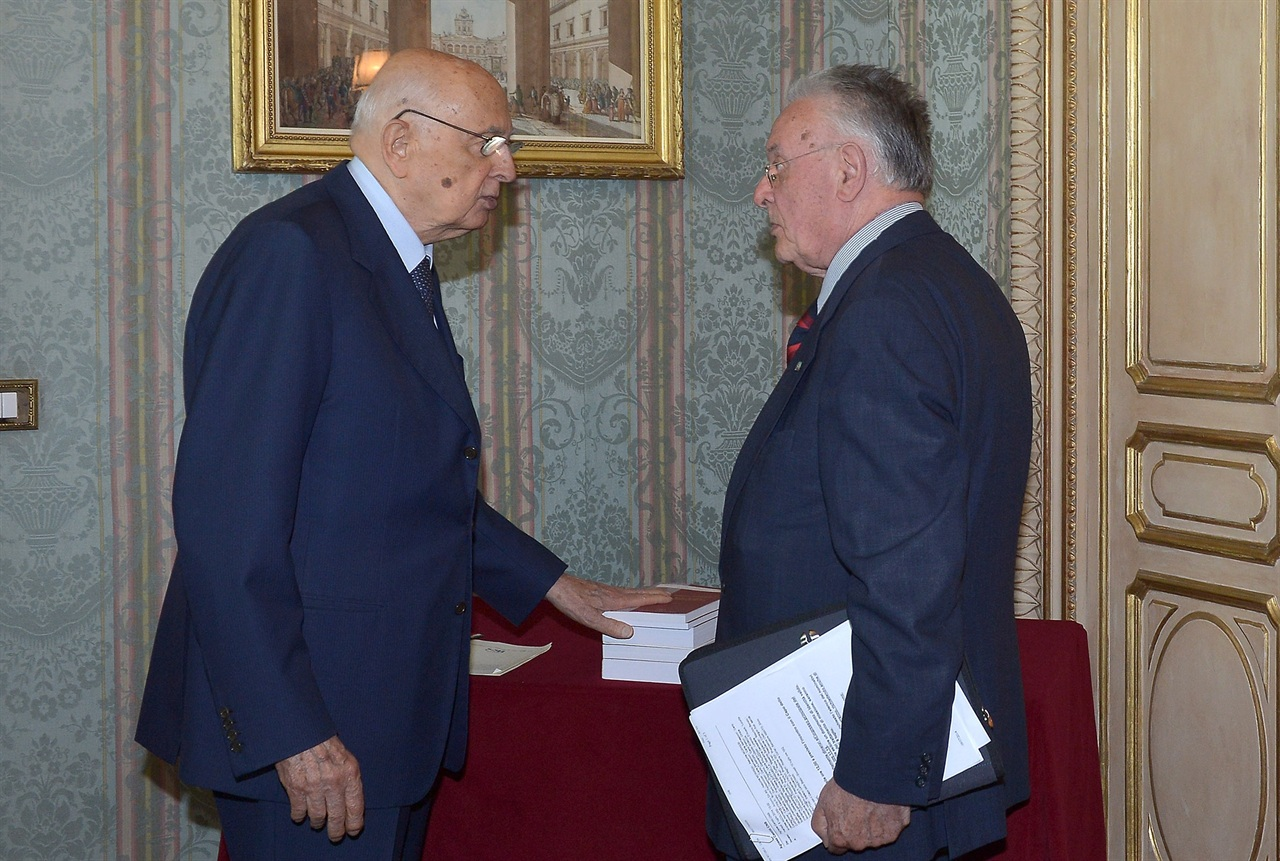
- Casavola (right) with President Giorgio Napolitano in 2014

President of the Constitutional Court of Italy
- In office 15 November 1992 – 25 February 1995
- Preceded by: Aldo Corasaniti
- Succeeded by: Antonio Baldassarre

Personal details
- Born: 12 January 1931 Taranto, Italy
- Died: 3 January 2026 (aged 94) Naples, Italy
- Education: University of Bari; University of Naples
- Occupation: Judge

Francesco Paolo Casavola (12 January 1931 – 3 January 2026) was an Italian judge. He served as president of the Constitutional Court from 1992 to 1995.

Casavola died in Naples on 3 January 2026, at the age of 94.
