= Vania Protti Traxler =

Italian businesswoman (1936–2026)

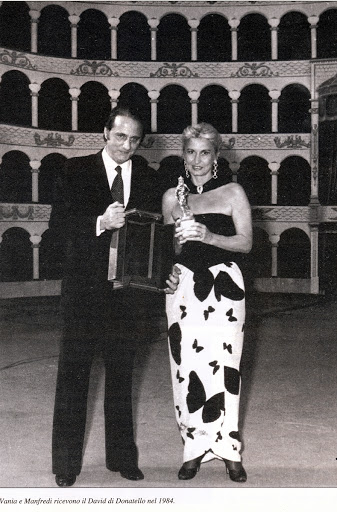
- Vania Protti Traxler and her husband Manfredi in 1984
- Born: November 6, 1936; Italy
- Died: June 5, 2026 (aged 89)
- Occupation: Businesswoman
- Known for: Founded the film distribution company Academy Pictures and distributing arthouse films
- Spouse: Teddy Reno (m. 1956; div. 1963) Manfredi Traxler ()
- Children: 1

Vania Protti Traxler (6 November 1936 – 5 June 2026) was an Italian businesswoman.

== Life and career ==
Protti was born on 6 November 1936 to a family with ties to the world of cinema. After separating from her first husband at the age of 26, she opened a fashion boutique in Riccione. After marrying her second husband, Manfredi Traxler, who worked at RAI, she closed the boutique to focus on cinema.

In 1976 they founded the distribution company Academy Pictures, which initially limited itself to a classic distribution, with a list that included one film per genre (a western, a children's film, a detective story, etc.). In 1978, however, there was a turning point: thanks to Fassbinder's The Marriage of Maria Braun, they began to distribute arthouse films, favoring films by emerging European authors and then turning to American independent cinema as well. They introduced many important directors to the general public, including Peter Greenaway, Wim Wenders, Éric Rohmer, Jim Jarmusch, Atom Egoyan, Pedro Almodóvar, Krzysztof Kieślowski and Spike Lee.

Protti Traxler died on 5 June 2026, at the age of 89.

== Recognition ==
- 2006: Vittorio De Sica Award
