= Claudio Appiani =

Italian rugby union player (1957–2026)

Claudio Appiani (14 January 1957 – 4 June 2026) was an Italian rugby union player and coach.

== Life and career ==
Appiani was born in Calvisano on 14 January 1957. He played for his hometown Rugby Calvisano between 1975 and 1976, before moving to Brescia, where he played between 1976 and 1982. He returned to Calvisano between 1982 and 1984.

He also worked as a coach in the 1990–1991 season for Gussago.

Appiani made his debut for the national team on 27 November 1976 in a victory against Spain in the 1976–77 FIRA Trophy, with a total of five appearances.

Appiani died on 4 June 2026, at the age of 69.
