= Fabio Scuto =

Italian journalist (1957–2026)

Fabio Scuto (12 August 1957 – 31 January 2026) was an Italian journalist.

== Life and career ==
Scuto was born in Rome on 12 August 1957. In 1984, he graduated in History and Geographical Sciences at the Sapienza University of Rome and in the following year he enrolled in the school of journalism of the Free International University of Social Studies Guido Carli (Luiss). He began writing for various newspapers even before graduating, in the early 80s. In 1987 he joined the editorial staff of the newspaper "la Repubblica".

In 1988 he was sent to Cyprus to interview the third president, George Vasiliou while in 1989 and 1990, he reported from Beirut during the Lebanese civil war. He also reported from Iraq following the war with Iran. During the Gulf War he was sent to Syria, Iraq and then Tunisia to follow the conflict, later he dealt with the fundamentalist explosion in Algeria and then the return from Swiss exile of Ahmed Ben Bella in Algiers. During the years of the PLO's internal debate on the negotiations with Israel, he conducted interviews with Yasser Arafat and Palestinian leaders.

From 2009 to 2014 he covered the three Gaza wars and in 2011 the events in Egypt from the end of the Mubarak era.

Scuto died on 31 January 2026, at the age of 68.
