= Matteo Fantuzzi =

Italian poet (1979–2026)

Matteo Fantuzzi (23 June 1979 – 9 June 2026) was an Italian poet.

== Life and work ==
Fantuzzi was born in Castel San Pietro Terme on 23 June 1979. He lived in Lugo di Romagna, in the province of Ravenna, where he worked for many years as a pharmacist, and also wrote for L'Unità.

In 2008, he published Kobarid, a poetic work with which he won the Camaiore Opera Prima Prize, in the youth section within the Camaiore Literary Prize: Francesco Belluomini. In 2017 he then published the collection of verses La stazione di Bologna, for the publishing house Feltrinelli.

He curated La línea del Sillaro, La generazione entrante and, together with Isabella Leardini, Post '900. Lyric and narrative.

In 2025, following a traffic collision, he was diagnosed with a tumour. Fantuzzi died on 9 June 2026, at the age of 46.
