= Mauro Viviani =

Italian football player (1949–2026)

Mauro Viviani (30 July 1949 – 8 June 2026) was an Italian football player and coach.

== Biography ==
Viviani began his career at the age of 16, playing for Rosignano Solvay, he remained there from 1965 to 1966, before transferring to Turin, where he reported the rupture of his cruciate ligament and the external meniscus during a friendly in 1966. After recovering, he transferred to Genoa's youth team, where he remained until 1969.

A defender, he played for Alassio between 1969 and 1970, Leonzio between 1970 and 1971, Colligiana between 1972 and 1973, Rovereto between 1973 and 1975, Merano between 1975 and 1976, Akragas between 1976 and 1978, Leonzio between 1978 and 1979, and finally Audace Portoferraio between 1980 and 1981.

Following his playing career, he had a successful coaching tenure.

Viviani died on 8 June 2026, at the age of 76.
