= Paolo Manunza =

Italian footballer (1955–2026)

Paolo Manunza (15 March 1955 – 8 June 2026) was an Italian footballer who played as a defender.

== Biography ==
Manunza was born in Cagliari on 15 March 1955. He started his professional career with Ragusa in the 1973–74 season. The following year, he was signed by Serie A side Fiorentina on 27 April 1975. Between 1975 and 1977, he played with Modena, before moving to Piacenza, where he played between 1977 and 1979.

Manunza died on 8 June 2026, at the age of 71.
