= Stefania Corna =

Italian volleyball player (1990–2026)

- Corna in 2012

Personal information
- Born: 5 November 1990; Bergamo, Italy
- Died: 7 October 2026 (aged 35); Boltiere, Italy
- Height: 190 cm (6 ft 3 in)
- Weight: 72 kg (159 lb)
- Spike: 302 cm (119 in)
- Block: 280 cm (110 in)

Volleyball information
- Position: Setter

Career
Years	Teams
2003–2005	Volley Bergamo
2005–2007	Club Italia
2007–2008	Volley Bergamo
2008–2009	Life Volley Milano
2009–2010	Parma Volley Girls
2010–2011	Pallavolo Villanterio
2011–2012	Cuatto Volley Giaveno
2012–2013	Volleyball Casalmaggiore
2013–2014	Promoball Volleyball Flero
2014	Pallavolo Scandicci
2014–2015	VC Kanti Schaffhausen
2015–2017	Maglie
2017	Cutrofiano Volley

National team
2006–2007	Italy U-18
2006–2008	Italy U-19
2007	Italy U-20
2011	Italy

Stefania Corna (5 November 1990 – 7 October 2026) was an Italian volleyball player.

Corna was victorious in the 2006 Women's Junior European Volleyball Championship and the 2008 Women's Junior European Volleyball Championship with the Italy U-20 team, as well as the 2008 Coppa Italia with Volley Bergamo.

Corna died on 7 October 2026, at the age of 35, following a long illness.
