= Paolo Cherchi =

Italian philologist and historian (1937–2026)

Paolo Cherchi (10 May 1937 – 4 April 2026) was an Italian philologist and historian of literature.

== Life and career ==
Cherchi was born in Oschiri on 10 May 1937. He graduated in literature from the University of Cagliari in 1962, and he later obtained a PhD in Romance languages at the University of California, Berkeley in 1966. From 1966 to 2003 he taught Italian and Spanish literature at the University of Chicago, where he became professor emeritus. From 2003 to 2009 he was also full professor of Italian literature at the University of Ferrara. He participated as a speaker in numerous congresses of international importance. From 2016 he was a foreign member of the Accademia dei Lincei.

Cherchi died in Chicago on 4 April 2026, at the age of 88.

== Awards ==
- In 2000, he received the special recognition of the jury of the Prix Dessì.
