= Roberto Cervellati =

Italian physicist and explorer (1933–2026)

Roberto Cervellati (13 November 1933 – 7 November 2026) was an Italian physicist and explorer.

== Life and career ==
Cervellati was a researcher at ENEA. He was a leading figure in Italian scientific expeditions to Antarctica. He participated in seven expeditions to the polar continent, also as head of mission.

As part of the National Antarctic Research Program, Cervellati held scientific coordination and operational responsibilities.

From 1992 to 2006, Cervellati represented Italy on the Scientific Committee for Research in Antarctica (SCAR). In those years, he also directed the sector involved in the creation of the continent's gazetteer.

Cervellati was struck in a hit-and-run traffic incident in Rome, on 6 November 2026. He died in hospital the following day, at the age of 92.
