= Ivanne Trebbi =

Italian politician (1928–2025)

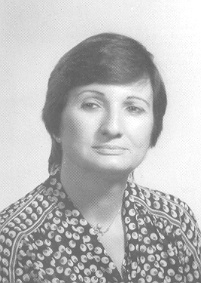

Member of the Chamber of Deputies of Italy for Como-Sondrio-Varese
- In office 20 June 1979 – 1 July 1987

Personal details
- Born: 31 January 1928 Argelato, Italy
- Died: 2 January 2026 (aged 97) Varese, Italy
- Party: PCI
- Occupation: Factory worker

Ivanne Trebbi (31 January 1928 – 2 January 2026) was an Italian politician. A member of the Italian Communist Party, she served in the Chamber of Deputies from 1979 to 1987.

Trebbi died in Varese on 2 January 2026, at the age of 97.
