= Ermanno Arslan =

Italian archaeologist (1940–2026)

Ermanno Arslan (15 August 1940 – 1 June 2026) was an Italian archaeologist.

== Life and career ==
After graduating from the Manzoni high school in Milan, in 1959, he graduated from the University of Pavia. In the following years he was a volunteer assistant at the archaeology chair of the University of Pavia and obtained various scholarships, working as an archaeologist between Pavia and Milan until 1973.

Between 1969 and 1973, he also worked at the Roman Museum of Brescia and in the last year he was appointed curator of the numismatic collections numismáticas of the Civic Archaeological Museum of Milan. From 1975 to 2003 he was director of the numismatic collection of the Sforza Castle, and, again in Milan, since 2003 he was the head of the municipal numismatic collections.

Arslan died on 1 June 2026, at the age of 85.
