= Natalino Irti =

Italian academic and jurist (1936–2026)

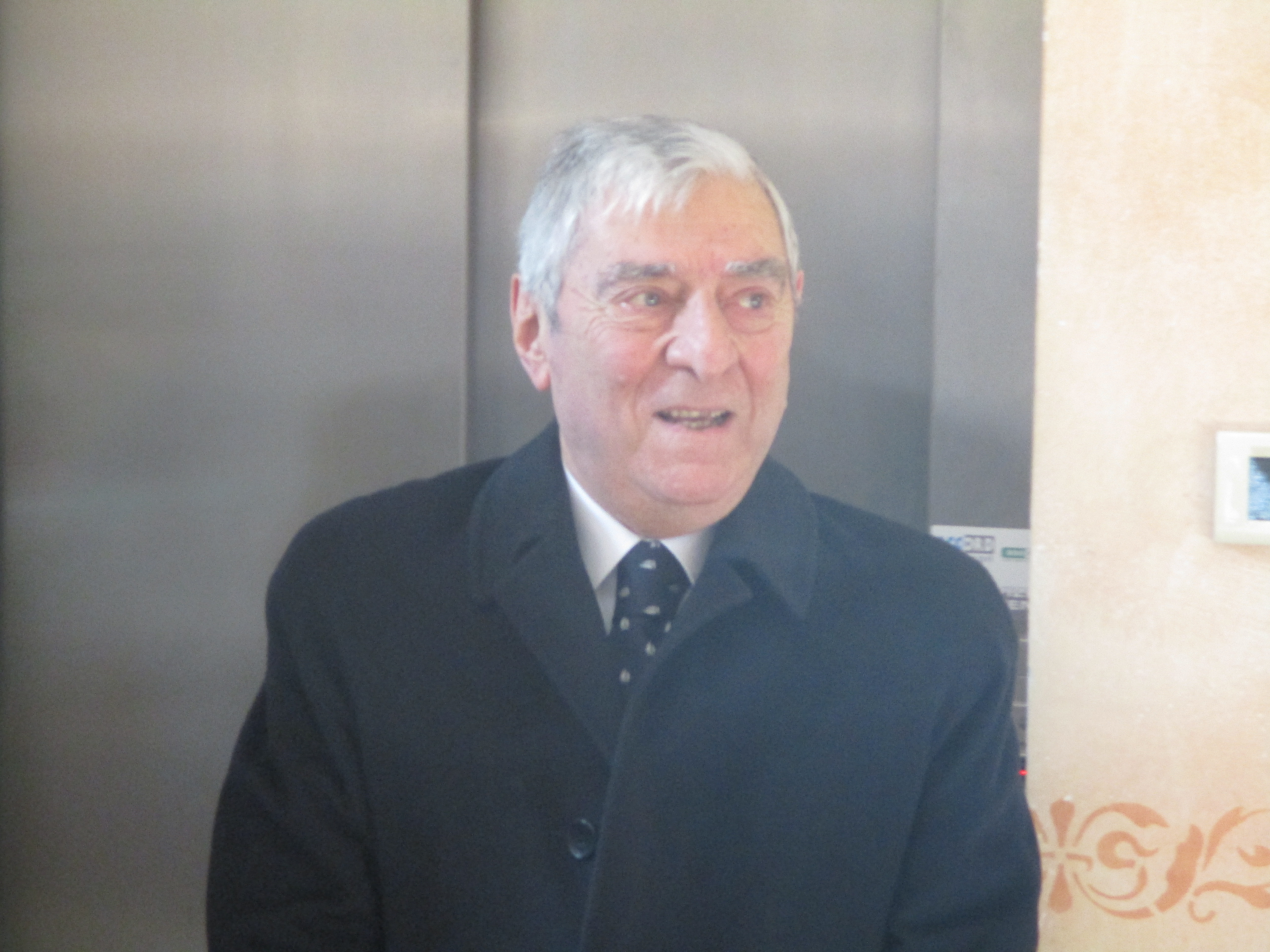
Irti in 2016

Natalino Irti (5 April 1936 – 11 June 2026) was an Italian academic and jurist.

== Life and career ==
Irti was born in Avezzano on 5 April 1936. He worked as a professor from 1968, teaching at the universities of Sassari, Parma, Perugia, Turin. In 1977, he began teaching law at the University of Rome La Sapienza.

He was President Emeritus of the Italian Institute for Historical Studies. On the recommendation of the Liberal Party, he held various positions in state-owned companies and was president of Credito Italiano, vice president of Enel, and a member of the IRI board.

From 1985 to 1987 he was also a city councilor of Rome.

Irti established and presided over the Nicola Irti Foundation (named in honor of his son, who died prematurely) for his commitment to charity and the promotion of cultural initiatives, whose board of directors is composed, among others, of members of the Irti family and members designated by the National Academy of the Lincei and the Pontifical Gregorian University.

Irti died on 11 June 2026, at the age of 90.
