= Tarquin =

Tarquin (Latin Tarquinius) may refer to:

- Tarquin (opera), a chamber opera

== Given name ==
- Lucius Tarquinius Priscus or Tarquin the Elder (died 579 BC), fifth of the seven legendary kings of Rome
- Lucius Tarquinius Superbus or Tarquin the Proud (died 496 BC), last of the seven legendary kings of Rome
- Sextus Tarquinius, son of Tarquin the Proud, of the Tarquin and Lucretia story
- Tarquin Hall (born 1969), British writer and journalist
- Tarquin Gotch, entertainment industry veteran

== Surname ==
- Brian Tarquin (21st century), American guitarist
- Didier Tarquin (born 1967), French cartoonist and scenarist

== Fictional ==
- Tarquin, a telepathic alien from the episode "Exile" of the science-fiction television series Star Trek: Enterprise.
- Tarquin Blackwood, a fictional character from The Vampire Chronicles
- General Tarquin, a character from the webcomic The Order of the Stick
- Tarquin Fin-tim-lin-bin-whin-bim-lim-bus-stop-F'tang-F'tang-Olé-Biscuitbarrel, character from the Monty Python sketch Election Night Special
- Tarquin, Sheridan's boyfriend on the TV series Keeping Up Appearances

== See also ==
- Tarkin (disambiguation)
