= Maricla Boggio =

Italian writer (1937–2026)

Maricla Boggio (11 December 1937 – 8 March 2026) was an Italian writer, playwright, essayist and journalist.

== Life and career ==
Boggio was born in Turin on 11 December 1937. She graduated in law at the University of Turin where she attended the teachings of Norberto Bobbio.

Throughout her life, she wrote hundreds of theatre scripts, essays and translations.

Boggio died on 8 March 2026, at the age of 88.

== Awards ==
- Knight of the Order of Merit of the Italian Republic (2006)
