= Marchesi Antinori warehouse theft =

2026 wine theft in Italy

The Marchesi Antinori warehouse theft was a crime committed in early October 2026 in the Italian commune of Cortona (province of Arezzo , Tuscany ). Having broken into the Marchesi Antinori wine warehouse , the criminals stole 30,000 bottles of wine with a total value of approximately € 5 million.

Company representatives reported that a large consignment of wine was being prepared for export. The theft, discovered on the morning of Monday, October 5, when warehouse employees returned to work, was apparently committed on Saturday, October 3. A group of at least seven individuals is believed to have been involved. The perpetrators disabled the alarm and security cameras, then used warehouse forklifts to load the crates of wine onto two of their trucks.

The crime has been called the largest wine theft not only in Italy but also in the world—both in terms of the number of bottles stolen and the total value of the wine. Among the Tuscan wines in the shipment were Marchesi Antinori 's Solaia, Guado al Tasso, and Tignanello. All the stolen bottles were from the 2023 harvest, with market prices ranging from 120 to 400 euros. In addition to standard bottles, the shipment also included magnum-size bottles.

The company's director, Renzo Cotarella, stated that their insurance did not cover damage of this scale. However, he expressed hope that the goods would be recovered, at least partially, since "two trucks can't just vanish into thin air". Furthermore, in his opinion, it was unlikely that the criminals would be able to sell such a quantity of wine without being detected. According to him, after the loss was discovered, the winery employees cried, since "it's not just the cost of the wine, it's something bigger."
