= Lorenza Trucchi =

Italian journalist (1922–2026)

- Born: 11 January 1922; Monaco
- Died: 4 February 2026 (aged 104); Rome, Italy
- Education: Academy of Fine Arts
- Occupation: Journalist

Lorenza Trucchi (11 January 1922 – 4 February 2026) was an Italian journalist, art critic and curator mostly known for her association with Alberto Burri and Jean Dubuffet.

== Biography ==
Trucchi was born in Monaco. She was the daughter of Olga Cassini and Lorenzo Trucchi, a surgeon who practised his profession in the Principality.

In 1933 Trucchi's family relocated to Rome. Although she enrolled to Law School, she became passionate about art and started collaborating with newspapers and periodicals, including Il Momento, Il Gazzettino, Il Corriere Mercantile, Leggere, Il Taccuino delle Arti, Giovedi and Art Dossier. In 1950 Dino Buzzati invited Trucchi to write for Corriere della Sera. In 1955, she contributed to La Fiera Letteraria and from 1967 to 1977 she had a weekly column called "Arte per tutti" on Momento Sera. From 1961 to 1968, she edited the art insert of the magazine L'Europa.

Trucchi was the first art critic to write about Alberto Burri's work. As a sign of gratitude, Burri titled one of his combustions after her. (Per Lorenza, la prima).

In 1988 and 1990 she was a member of the Commission of the Visual Arts Sector of the Venice Biennale.

From 1969 to 1994 Trucchi taught Art History at the Academy of Fine Arts in L'Aquila and Rome.

In 1995 she was appointed President of the Rome Quadriennale, the first woman to hold that role. Under Trucchi's leadership, the Quadriennale went through substantial modifications, shifting its focus to emerging Italian artists like Maurizio Cattelan, Vanessa Beecroft and Massimo Bartolini. On the occasion of the 12th edition of the Quadriennale (1992), Trucchi established an international committee with Norman Rosenthal, Giovanni Carandente and Dan Cameron, and invited architect Massimiliano Fuksas to work on the installation. The exhibition featured 174 artists in two separate venues – Palazzo delle Esposizioni and the Roma Termini railway station. Trucchi retired from the Quadriennale in 2001.

Trucchi turned 100 in January 2022, and died on 4 February 2026, at the age of 104.

== Selected Publications ==
- Qualche ritratto da Cézanne a Pollock, Carocci, Rome, 1961
- Carmelina di Capri, Scheiwiller, Milan, 1964
- Jean Dubuffet, Sigma, Rome, 1965
- Alberto Burri, Galleria Civica di Arte Moderna, Rome, 1971
- Francis Bacon, Thames & Hudson, London, and Harry N. Abrams, New York, 1975
- Franco Sarnari, Skira, Milan, 1983
- Francis Bacon: oeuvres 1944-1982, Celiv, Paris, 1989
- Novelli: Design, The Murray and Isabella Rayburn Foundation, New York, 1990
- Sante Monachesi: Selected Works / Oeuvres Choisies 1943-1980, National Arts Centre/Centre National Des Arts, Ottawa, 1991
- Arte per tutti, Edizioni della Cometa, Rome, 1992
- Francis Bacon, De Luca, Rome, 2005
