= Franco Vito Gaiezza =

Italian writer and musician (1962–2026)

Franco Vito Gaiezza (29 October 1962 – 6 March 2026) was an Italian musician and writer.

== Life and career ==
Gaiezza was born in Rome on 29 October 1962. He performed in concerts for organ, piano or harpsichord in Italy and abroad. For Radio 3 he recorded numerous broadcasts in 1985 and 1986. On 19 June 2007, he performed in Paris with the organist Jean Guillou, on the occasion of the 18th St. Eustache International Festival, in the world premiere performance of the piece The Revolt of the Organs by Guillou.

He founded the Albert Schweitzer Association in Palermo, with which he has organized numerous concerts in Italy and Europe.

Gaiezza died on 6 March 2026, at the age of 66.
