= Eugenio Viale =

Italian politician (1939–2026)

Member of the Chamber of Deputies
- In office 2001–2006

Personal details
- Born: March 6, 1939
- Died: March 3, 2026 (aged 86)
- Party: Forza Italia
- Occupation: Politician, businessman

Eugenio Viale (6 March 1939 – 3 March 2026) was an Italian politician.

== Life and career ==
Viale graduated in law and was a businessman in the food sector. In the 2001 political elections, he was elected deputy with the Abolition of the spin-off list linked to Forza Italia. From 2001 to 2006 he was a member and secretary of the VI Parliamentary Finance Commission and from 2002 to 2006 he was also a member of the IX Public and Private Employment Commission.

Viale died on 3 March 2026, at the age of 86.
