= Sergio Tarquinio =

Italian painter and comics artist (1925–2026)

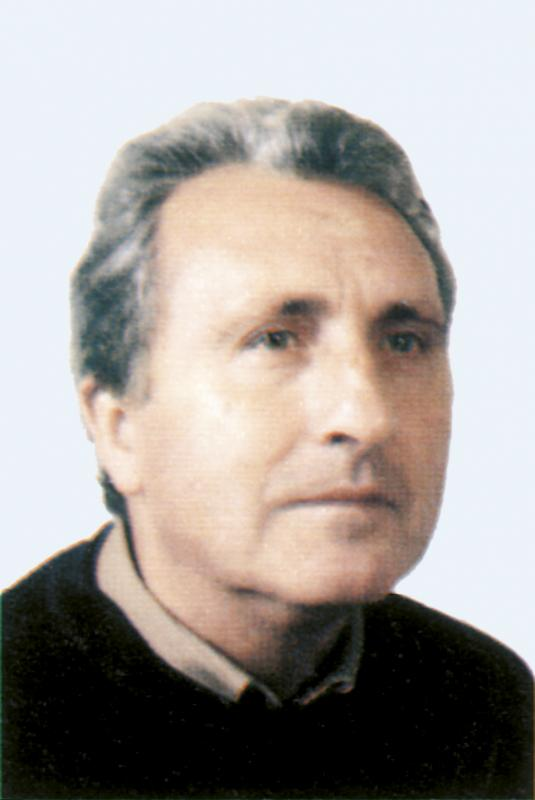
- Born: 13 October 1925; Cremona, Italy
- Died: 11 January 2026 (aged 100); Cremona, Italy
- Occupations: Painter; Comics artist

Sergio Tarquinio (13 October 1925 – 11 January 2026) was an Italian painter and comics artist.

Tarquinio specialised in creating adventure comics for a general audience. Notably, his stories appeared in monthly magazines sold in French newsstands and were known as "pocket-sized comics".

Tarquinio died in Cremona on 11 January 2026, at the age of 100.
