= Giovanni Bolzoni (footballer, born 1937) =

Italian footballer (1937–2026)

Giovanni Bolzoni (25 June 1937 – 13 March 2026) was an Italian footballer who played as a midfielder. He played for Sampdoria (1957 to 1960), Genoa (1960 to 1963), Napoli (1963 to 1966), Salernitana (1966 to 1968), before ending his career with Rapallo (1968 to 1969).

Bolzoni died on 13 March 2026, at the age of 88.
