= 2026 in Germany =

- Decades: 2000s; 2010s; 2020s; 2030s
- See also: Other events of 2026; History of Germany; Timeline; Years

Events in the year 2026 in Germany.

== Incumbents ==
- President: Frank-Walter Steinmeier
- Chancellor: Friedrich Merz

== Events ==
=== January ===
- 1 January – Two people are killed in fireworks-related incidents during New Year's celebrations in Bielefeld.
- 3 January – An arson attack on cables in Berlin causes a blackout affecting 40,000 households. Left-wing Vulkangruppe (Volcano Group) claims responsibility and calls it a protest against fossil fuel usage and AI data centers.
- 6 January – The governing coalition between the SPD and the BSW in Brandenburg is replaced by a new coalition between the SPD and the CDU.
- 7 January – The government formally recognizes and establishes diplomatic relations with Niue, coordinating ties from the embassy in Wellington, New Zealand.
- 8–11 January – 2026 Men's EuroHockey Indoor Championship in Heidelberg.
- 20 January – Thousands of people protest across Dortmund, Frankfurt, and Bremen, in support of Kurdish forces against the Syrian Armed Forces in clashes in northeastern Syria.
- 21 January – A dual German-Ukrainian citizen is arrested in Berlin on suspicion of spying for Russia. The incident results in the expulsion of a Russian diplomat from Germany the next day.
- 23 January – A Lebanese national is arrested at Berlin Brandenburg Airport on suspicion of membership in Hamas and plotting a terrorist attack in Europe.
- 28 January – Sven Schulze is elected as minister-president of Saxony-Anhalt.

=== February ===
- 2 February –
  - A nationwide strike is held by ver.di demanding shortened shifts for public workers and increased bonuses, causing extensive disruption to public transportation.
  - Five people are arrested in Lübeck and Lauenburg on suspicion of illegally exporting goods to Russian defense companies.
- 3 February – Two people are arrested on suspicion of plotting to sabotage several corvettes destined for the German Navy at a shipyard in Hamburg in 2025.
- 5 February – The Federal Cartel Office orders Amazon, Inc. to return 59 million euros ($70 million) in profits from unfair trading practices.
- 9 February – Authorities seize eight metric tons of cocaine valued at 500 million euros ($582 million) from a container in Wilhelmshaven that originated from West Africa and supposedly contained cacao beans, resulting in two arrests in Spain.
- 25 February – A suspect in the 2025 murder of Ukrainian politician Andriy Portnov is arrested in Heinsberg.
- 26 February – A court in Cologne issues an injunction against the Federal Office for the Protection of the Constitution's designation of the AfD as an extremist organization pending a judicial review.

=== March ===
- 5 March – A court in Berlin convicts a Syrian national for carrying out a antisemitic knife attack at the Memorial to the Murdered Jews of Europe that injured one person in 2025 and sentences him to 13 years' imprisonment.
- 8 March
  - 2026 Baden-Württemberg state election: The Greens win a plurality of 30.2% in the Landtag of Baden-Württemberg, the CDU win 29,7% and the AfD win 18.8% in the Landtag.
  - A meteorite strikes a roof of a house in Koblenz, Rhineland-Palatinate. No one is injured.
- 12 March – German economic crisis: Lufthansa pilots organize a 48-hour strike over ongoing pension dispute, causing major delays at all German airports.
- 19 March – Germany drops out of defending Israel in the International Court of Justice's genocide case against Israel, citing their need to defend themselves in a separate case launched against them by Nicaragua.
- 22 March – 2026 Rhineland-Palatinate state election
- 29 March – A nightclub burns down in Kehl, Baden-Württemberg. All 750 people inside are evacuated, three of whom are treated for shock.

=== April ===
- 5 April – Three people, including two children, are killed and another is seriously injured after high winds cause a tree to fall onto an Easter egg hunt in Mittelangeln, Schleswig-Holstein.
- 13 April – A wooden structure containing anti-semitic symbols is found outside the Eggenfelden tax office.
- 28 April – A Kazakh national is arrested in Germany on suspicion of spying for Russia.

=== May ===
- 4 May – A car plows into a crowd in Grimmaische Strasse in Leipzig, killing two people and injuring 22 others.
- 7 May – A 17-year old male is arrested on suspicion of plotting to carry out terrorist attacks in Hamburg on behalf of Islamic State.
- 13 May – In Baden-Württemberg, Cem Özdemir becomes the first Minister-President of Turkish background.
- 16 May – Germany finishes 23rd at Eurovision 2026 in Austria.
- 20 May – The Public Prosecutor General arrests a Chinese couple in Munich on suspicion of spying for Chinese intelligence.
- 27 May – 2026 UEFA Conference League final in Leipzig.

=== June ===
- 3 June – Hotel Zum Hirschen in Lam, Bavaria responds to an Israeli family attempting to make a reservation through Booking.com with: "Sorry, there are no Jews allowed in our hotel." Booking.com removes the hotel from its platform following backlash, and the hotel subsequently apologizes for the message.
- 11 June–19 July – Germany participates at the 2026 FIFA World Cup.
- 17 June —
  - Germany and Poland sign a defense cooperation agreement.
  - The medieval manuscript of Gaude Mater Polonia, a ring of Polish King Sigismund the Old, and a collection of miniature model trains from a pre-war museum in Warsaw, all looted by Germany from Poland during World War II, are repatriated by Germany.
- 19 June – Two freight trains collide in Munich, killing one person.
- 23 June – Almost the entire Deutsche Bahn railway network shuts down for two hours as part of scheduled maintenance on a communications system, triggering major transport disruptions.
- 27 June — 2026 European heatwaves: The highest recorded temperature in Germany is taken in Möckern-Drewitz, measuring 41.5 °C (106.7 °F).
- 29 June – A shooting in Stade kills six people. Police detain a male suspect.

=== July ===
- 1 July – Prosecutors in Hesse arrest a German–Rwandan national on suspicion of complicity in the 1994 Rwandan genocide.
- 4 July – The Alternative for Germany (AfD) holds its party congress in Erfurt. Tino Chrupalla and Alice Weidel are re-elected as party-leaders.
- 9 July – Chancellor Friedrich Merz announces that the Trump administration agreed to the sale of Tomahawk missiles to Germany.
- 13 July – A Munich court imprisons an Iraqi couple who were members of Islamic State for enslaving and raping Yazidi girls.
- 25 July
  - A small plane carrying two people crashes into a house in Ganderkesee.
  - One person is killed and 29 others are injured in a vehicle-ramming and stabbing attack near the Christopher Street Day in Berlin. The 21-year-old male suspect is shot and killed by police the next day after rushing at officers with a knife in Spandau, Berlin.
- 31 July – 2020s European rearmament: The number of soldiers in the Bundeswehr reaches 186,700, the highest amount in 13 years.

=== August ===
- 4 August – An attempted drone attack blamed by the German government on Russia is carried out on a Ukrainian aircraft in Leipzig/Halle Airport.
- 5 August – The Hanseatic Higher Regional Court in Hamburg convicts seven members and one supporter of the "Last Defense Wave" extremist group and sentences them to prison for attempted murder, arson, aggravated assault, and being members of a terrorist organisation for planning and carrying out arson and bomb attacks on asylum seeker shelters.
- 12 August – Germany approves a large overhaul of its intelligence agencies, granting them vast new powers to conduct clandestine operations and combat external threats, especially Russian hybrid warfare.
- 11–23 August – 2026 FEI World Championships in Aachen.
- 26 August – Two employees at Frankfurt Airport are reported to have died from the first outbreak of aviation-acquired malaria in Germany since 2023.
- 27 August – Two people are killed in an incident of domestic violence at a school in Gosen-Neu Zittau.

=== September ===
- 1 September – Germany orders the closure of the Russian consulate and cultural center in Berlin after it finds the Russian government responsible for the 2026 Leipzig Airport drone attack.
- 2 September – An explosion near a train station injures two people in Augsburg.
- 4–13 September – 2026 FIBA Women's Basketball World Cup in Berlin.
- 6 September – 2026 Saxony-Anhalt state election: The AfD wins a plurality of 43.8% in elections to the Landtag of Saxony-Anhalt.
- 10 September – Charlotte Knobloch, a Jewish leader and Holocaust survivor, receives a death threat following a call to ban the AfD.
- 12 September – A woman is injured in an antisemitic attack in Berlin.
- 20 September –
  - 2026 Berlin state election: The Left becomes the largest party in the Berlin House of Representatives, followed by the CDU.
  - 2026 Mecklenburg-Vorpommern state election: The AfD becomes the largest party in the Landtag of Mecklenburg-Vorpommern, with the CDU failing to reach the threshold to remain in the chamber.
- 22 September –
  - An F-16 fighter jet of the United States Air Force crashes near Spangdahlem Air Base. The pilot ejects safely.
  - The discovery of the Wesseling Hoard is announced.
- 25 September –
  - The town of Heidenau in Saxony bans future Holocaust memorial plaques with support from the AfD and CDU.
  - A wave of strikes are held in schools nationwide by student protesting against the government's plans to reintroduce conscription.
- 27 September – A bus carrying tourists to a festival in Munich overturns, killing two people and injuring eight others.

=== October ===
- 6 October – Tobias Rausch from the AfD is elected speaker of the Landtag of Saxony-Anhalt.
- 13 October – Three people are killed and five others are injured in an apartment building fire in Bochum, North Rhine-Westphalia.
- 15 October – A Hamburg court imprisons two men convicted of plotting assaults against prominent pro-Israel public figures and spying on Jews for Iran's Quds Force.
- 22 October – Authorities in Brandenburg arrest a Ukrainian national suspected of spying for Russia.
- 23 October – The Kehlsteinhaus, a historic Nazi-era mountaintop retreat above Berchtesgaden in the Bavarian Alps, is heavily damaged by a fire.
- 31 October – Riots break out in Frankfurt amid nationwide protests against high living costs.

=== November ===
- 6 November – Israel and Germany extend their energy partnership into 2027.
- 16 November – The Germany national football team plays its final match wearing Adidas kits against the Netherlands, ending a partnership of more than 70 years.

=== Predicted and scheduled ===
- 31 December – The television channels One, Tagesschau24 and Alpha will close.

== Holidays ==
- 1 January – New Year's Day
- 6 January – Epiphany
- 8 March – International Women's Day
- 2 April – Maundy Thursday
- 3 April – Good Friday
- 5 April – Easter Sunday
- 6 April – Easter Monday
- 1 May – International Workers' Day
- 9 May – Ascension Day
- 24 May – Whit Sunday
- 25 May – Whit Monday
- 4 June – Corpus Christi
- 15 August – Assumption Day
- 20 September – Children's Day
- 3 October – German Unity Day
- 31 October – Reformation Day
- 1 November – All Saints' Day
- 18 November – Repentance Day
- 25 December – Christmas Day
- 26 December – Saint Stephen's Day

== Art and entertainment ==
- List of German submissions for the Academy Award for Best International Feature Film

== Deaths ==
=== January ===
- 1 January – Hubertus von Pilgrim, 94, sculptor
- 2 January – Lajos Rovátkay, 92, harpsichordist and musicologist
- 4 January – Klaus Keitel, 87, politician
- 6 January – Kathleen Muxel, 54, member of the Landtag of Brandenburg (since 2019)
- 7 January – Dietrich Stratmann, 89, physicist and politician
- 8 January – Jürgen Plagemann, 90, rower
- 9 January – Hans Herrmann , 98, racing driver
- 12 January – Martin Willich, 80, politician
- 13 January – Peter Duesberg, 89, molecular biologist
- 19 January – Peter Radunski, 86, politician
- 20 January – Wolfgang Heichel, 75, singer (Dschinghis Khan)
- 21 January – Rüdiger Erben, 58, member of the Landtag of Saxony-Anhalt (2006, since 2011)
- 22 January – Francis Buchholz, 71, musician and bass guitarist
- 29 January – Stefan Gossler, 71, actor
- 31 January – Gisela Engeln-Müllges, 85, mathematician

=== February ===
- 1 February – Rita Süssmuth, 88, president of the Bundestag (1988–1998) and federal minister for youth, family and health (1985–1988)
- 3 February – Herbert Sukopp, 95, ecologist
- 11 February –
  - Christoph Luitpold Frommel, 92, art historian
  - Helmuth Rilling, 92, choral conductor
  - Peter Meyer, 85, footballer

=== March ===
- 1 March – Käthe Menzel-Jordan, 109, architect
- 14 March – Jürgen Habermas, 96, philosopher and sociologist (The Theory of Communicative Action)
- 14 March – Jochen Bachfeld, 73, boxer
- 21 March – Carsten Träger, 52, politician (SPD)
- 25 March – Alexander Kluge, 94, author, philosopher and film director
- 28 March – Werner Asam, 81, actor

=== April ===
- 5 April – Eberhard Riedel, 88, skier
- 6 April – Christian Schwarz-Schilling, politician (CDU)
- 8 April – Mario Adorf, 95, actor
- 12 April – Leo Nowak, 97, Roman Catholic bishop
- 30 April – Georg Baselitz, 88, painter

=== May ===
- 9 May – Harald Mothes, 69, footballer (Wismut Aue, TSV Ampfing, East Germany national team)
- 10 May – Günther Maria Halmer, 83, actor
- 11 May – Albrecht Weinberg, 101, Holocaust survivor (death announced on this date)
- 15 May – Angelica Domröse, 85, actress
- 29 May – Bruno Kant, 110, supercentenarian and Roman Catholic priest.
- Hugo Broch, 104, World War II flying ace, last living recipient of the Knight's Cross of the Iron Cross (exact date undisclosed).

=== June ===
- 3 June – Herbert Möller, 103, politician
- 5 June – Jürgen Kesting, 86, journalist, music critic and author
- 6 June –
  - Dieter Wunderlich, 85, linguist
  - Ute Walther, 83, mezzo-soprano
  - Ingeborg Kaiser, 95, German-Swiss writer
- 8 June – Hans Maier, 95, politician
- 9 June –
  - Wolfgang Gust, 91, journalist
  - Alexander Licht, 74, politician
  - Heinz-Jürgen Koloczek, 82, politician, mayor of Tuttlingen (1980–2004).
- 10 June –
  - Hüseyin Kenan Aydın, 63, politician
  - Dieter Glemser, 92, touring car racing driver
- 11 June – Hans Gerd Klais, 96, organ builder
- 21 June – Abdul Ahad Momand, 66–67, Afghan-born astronaut (Mir EP-3).
- 27 June – Thomas Fey, 65, orchestral conductor.
- 28 June – Wolfgang Paul, 86, footballer (Borussia Dortmund, West Germany national team).

=== July ===
- 3 July – Lydia Möcklinghoff, 45, ecologist and zoologist.
- 5 July – Adolf Seger, 81, freestyle wrestler
- 7 July – Hans-Werner Müller, 83, politician (CDU)
- 12 July – Karl Weber, 90, politician (CDU)
- 13 July – Manfred Manglitz, 86, footballer
- 13 July – Michael Stürmer, 87, historian
- 14 July – Wolfgang Brase, 87, footballer
- 14 July – Markus Beierle, 54, footballer
- 20 July – Joachim Kerzel, 84, actor and syncronspeaker
- 24 July –
  - Günter Bannas, 74, journalist (FAZ)
  - Gunther von Hagens, 81, anatomist and businessman
- 26 July –
  - Adolf Bauer, 86, politician (SPD)
  - Gisela Kubon-Gilke, 69, economist
  - Udo Margedant, 84, political scientist
- 30 July – Thea Dückert, 76, politician

=== August ===
- 4 August – Klaus Hänsch, 87, member (1979–2009) and president (1994–1997) of the European Parliament.
- 12 August – Cordula Trantow, 83, actress
- 13 August – Helmut Lethen, 87, germanist and writer
- 17 August – Fritz Schramma, 79, politician
- 24 August – Klaus-Michael Kühne, 89, businessman

=== September ===
- 1 September –
  - Konrad Jarausch, 85, historian.
  - Eberhard Vogel, 83, football player (Carl Zeiss Jena, East Germany national team) and manager (Hannover 96), Olympic bronze medallist (1964, 1972).
- 5 September – Michael Mendl, 82, actor
- 15 September – Ralf Richter, 68, actor
- 19 September – Peter Hermann, 74, football player (Alemannia Aachen, Bayer Leverkusen) and manager

=== October ===
- 7 October – Klaus Bresser, 90, journalist
- 20 October – Manuel Otto, 30, computer game developer.
- 23 October – Josef Duchač, 88, minister-president of Thuringia (1990–1992)
- 28 October – Elke Sommer, 85, actress
- 31 October – Horst Fascher, 90, music manager, co-founder of the Star-Club

=== November ===
- 1 November – Regina Ziegler, 82, film and television producer
- 3 November – Janosch, 95, author
- 4 November – Hubert Aiwanger, 55, politician
- 11 November – Peter Iden, 82, writer and art critic
- 16 November – Jürgen Chrobog, 86, diplomat
- 21 November – Friedrich Christian Flick, 82, art collector

== See also ==
- 2026 in the European Union
- 2026 in Europe
