= 1925 in Germany =

- Decades: 1900s; 1910s; 1920s; 1930s; 1940s
- See also: Other events of 1925; History of Germany • Timeline • Years

Events in the year 1925 in Germany.

== Incumbents ==
=== National level ===
- President of Germany - Friedrich Ebert (Social Democrats) (to 28 February), Paul von Hindenburg (from 12 May)
- Chancellor - Wilhelm Marx (Centre) (to 15 January), Hans Luther (German People's Party) (from 15 January)

== Events ==
- 15 January – Centre Party member Hans Luther becomes Chancellor of Germany after the resignation of Wilhelm Marx.
- 25 February – Adolf Hitler makes his first public appearance since being released from prison
- 25 April – Paul von Hindenburg, winning 48.5% of the popular vote against the Centre Party's Wilhelm Marx with 45.2%, is elected President of Germany.
- 13 July – France begins to withdraw from the Rhineland.
- 18 July – Publication of Mein Kampf
- 29 August – Walther von Lüttwitz and members involved in the attempted "Kapp Putsch" coup of March 1920 are granted amnesty by the German government.
- 5–16 October – The United Kingdom, France, Italy, Belgium, and Germany agree to the established western borders and signs mutual assistance pacts in order to stabilize Germany's eastern borders at the local area Locarno Conference.
- 12 October – Germany and the Soviet Union sign an economic treaty.
- 1 December – The UK withdraws from Cologne, Germany.

== Births ==
- 8 January – Helmuth Hübener, German youth political activist against the Hitler regime (died 1942)
- 1 February – Lucille Eichengreen, German writer and Holocaust survivor (d. 2020)
- 7 March
  - Josef Ertl, German politician (died 2000)
  - Willigis Jäger, German Benedictine friar, mystic and Zen master (died 2020)
  - Albrecht Weinberg, German Holocaust survivor (died 2026)
- 13 March – Inge Müller, writer (died 1966)
- 24 March – Puig Aubert, French rugby league footballer (died 1994)
- 2 April – Hans Rosenthal, German television presenter (died 1987)
- 11 April – Emil Mangelsdorff, German jazz musician (died 2022)
- 5 May – Eddi Arent, German actor (died 2013)
- 7 May – Wolf Schneider, German journalist, author and language critic (died 2022)
- 16 May – Hannes Hegen, German cartoonist and illustrator (died 2014)
- 28 May – Dietrich Fischer-Dieskau, German lyric baritone and conductor (died 2012)
- 31 May – Frei Otto, German architect (died 2015)
- 17 July – Anita Lasker-Wallfisch, German-born British cellist
- 18 July – Friedrich Zimmermann, German politician (died 2015)
- 19 July – Michael Pfeiffer, German footballer (died 2015)
- 15 August – Leonie Ossowski, German writer (died 2019)
- 25 August – Hilmar Hoffmann, German film and culture academic (died 2018)
- 5 September – Ludwig Sebus, German singer
- 6 September – Moshe Goshen-Gottstein, German-born Israeli linguist (died 1991)
- 13 September – Wolfgang Haber, German biologist (died 2026)
- 7 October – Fred Bertelmann, German singer (died 2014)
- 12 November – Heinz Schubert, German actor and comedian (died 1999)
- 20 November – Clytus Gottwald, German choral musician (died 2023)
- 19 December – Tankred Dorst, German dramatist (died 2017)
- 28 December – Hildegard Knef, German actress (died 2002)
- 30 December – Frank Meisler, Danzig-born Israeli architect and sculptor (died 2018)

== Deaths ==
=== January ===
- 4 or 5 January – Richard Saran, (72) German architect (born 1852)
- 7 January – Emil Schäpe, (34) German fighter pilot (born 1890)

=== February ===
- 28 January – Friedrich Ebert, (54) President of Germany (born 1871)

=== May ===
- 12 May – Hans-Georg von der Marwitz, World War I German flying ace (born 1893)

=== June ===
- 15 June – Richard Teichmann, (56) German chess master (born 1868)

=== October ===
- Anna Schäffer, German woman who lived in Mindelstetten in Bavaria. Canonised by Pope Benedict XVI on 21 October 2012. (born 1882)
- 9 October – Hugo Preuß, (64) German lawyer and liberal politician (born 1860

=== November ===
- 14 November – Agnes Zimmermann, (78) German concert pianist and composer (born 1847)

=== December ===
- 9 December – Herman Schalow, (73) German ornithologist (born 1852)

=== Date unknown ===
- Martin Zander
