= Wattenberg =

Wattenberg or Wattenburg may refer to:

== Places ==
- Wattenberg, Austria
- Wattenberg (Habichtswald), a mountain in Hesse, Germany
- Wattenberg, Colorado, also spelled Wattenburg, in the United States
- Wattenberg Gas Field, United States

== Other ==
- Wattenberg (surname), a list of people with the surname
