= Schlicht =

Schlicht (from Old High German sleht "even", "plain", "simple", "natural" (cognate with Old English sliht)) is a German surname belonging to the group of family names based on a personal characteristic, in this case derived from a nickname originally used for a straightforward, artless person. It is the chiefly Low German variant of Schlecht and like it arose before the semantic change of s(ch)le(c)ht/s(ch)li(c)ht from the rather positiv "straight", "plain", "simple", "well" to present-day "bad", "evil", "wicked" in the 15th century and may also be habitational in origin, stemming from several small settlements with that name (from sleht in the sense "flat").
Notable people with the name include:

- Ekkehart Schlicht (born 1945), German economist
- Michael Schlicht (born 1993), German footballer
- Otto Schlicht, German-American musical instrument maker
- Svenja Schlicht (born 1967), German former swimmer
