= Schlacht =

Schlacht may refer to:

- Schlacht, a 2007 album by Avatar
- Schlachtflugzeug, or ground-attack aircraft

== See also ==
- Schlecht, a surname
