= Wattenberg (surname) =

Wattenberg is a surname. Notable people with the surname include:

- Ben Wattenberg (1933–2015), American conservative author
- Bill Wattenburg (born 1936), American inventor and talk show host
- Daniel Wattenberg (born 1959), American journalist and musician, son of Ben
- Frida Wattenberg (1924–2020), member of the French Resistance
- Gregg Wattenberg, American musician
- Laura Wattenberg, American name expert
- Luke Wattenberg (born 1997), American football player
- Martin M. Wattenberg (born 1970), software developer and artist
- Martin Wattenberg (political scientist), American political scientist
