= Hans Gerd Klais =

German organ builder (1930–2026)

- Born: 2 December 1930; Bonn, Rhine Province, Prussia, Germany
- Died: 11 June 2026 (aged 95)
- Education: Beethoven-Gymnasium Bonn
- Occupation: Organ builder

Hans Gerd Klais (2 December 1930 – 11 June 2026) was a German organ builder. A member of the Society of Organ Friends, he served as chairman of the Bund Deutscher Orgelbaumeister from 1974 to 2000.

Klais died on 11 June 2026, at the age of 95.
