= Gisela Kubon-Gilke =

German economist (1956–2026)

- Born: 15 August 1956; Bremen, West Germany
- Died: 26 July 2026 (aged 69)
- Education: University of Göttingen
- Occupations: Economist, professor
- Employer: Technische Universität Darmstadt

Gisela Kubon-Gilke (15 August 1956 – 26 July 2026) was a German economist and professor of economics and social policy at the Technische Universität Darmstadt (TU Darmstadt).

== Life and career ==
Gisela Kubon-Gilke was born on 15 August 1956, in Bremen, West Germany. She finished secondary school in Göttingen in 1975. From 1975 to 1980, she studied economics at the University of Göttingen. She studied business at TU Darmstadt from 1981 to 1983. Between 1983 and 1988, she served as a research assistant at the chair of economic theory under Ekkehart Schlicht at TU Darmstadt, where she earned her doctorate certificate in 1989.

She worked as a researcher at TU Darmstadt, where she completed her habilitation in economics in 1996. In 1997, she served as the Professor of Economics and Social Policy at the Evangelische Hochschule Hessen. She served as the vice president of Teaching and Student Affairs from 2013 to 2019 and became a senior professor in 2022. She became an honorary member of the Society for Gestalt Theory and its Applications and an elected member of the European Academy of Sciences and Arts.

Kubon-Gilke died on 26 July 2026, at the age of 69.
