= 2026 Leipzig car incident =

Road incident in Saxony, Germany

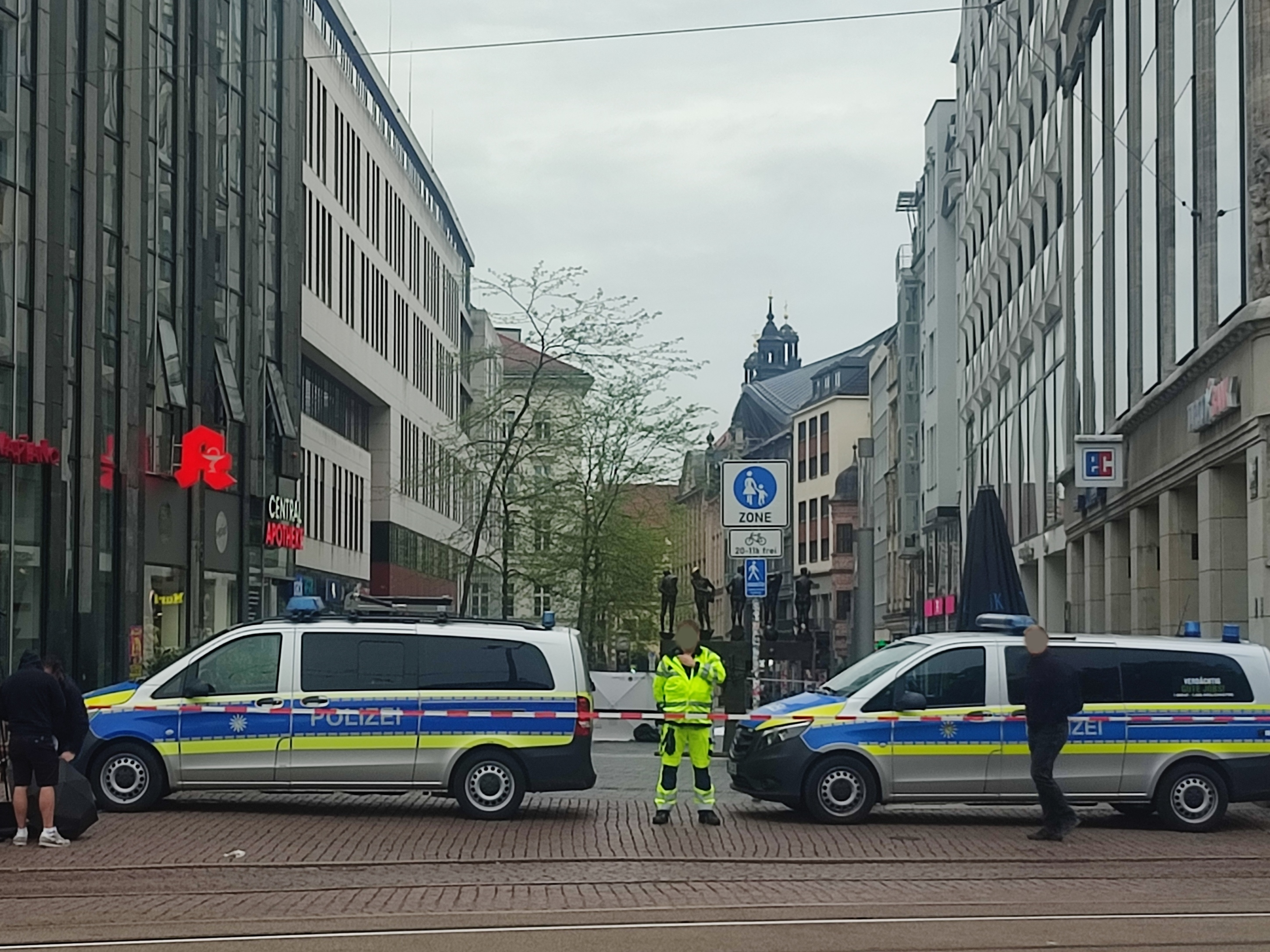
- The entrance to Grimmaische Strasse from Augustusplatz the day after the incident
- Date: 4 May 2026
- Time: c.16:45 (CET)
- Location: Leipzig, Saxony, Germany
- Deaths: 2
- Injuries: 6
- Accused: Jeffrey K.
- Charges: Murder x2 Attempted murder x85 Aggravated assault x8 Aggravated dangerous interference with road traffic x91

On 4 May 2026, a man drove a car into pedestrians in the city center of Leipzig, Saxony, Germany. Two people were killed and six others were injured, including two seriously. The driver, a German citizen with a history of mental illness, was arrested.

== Incident ==
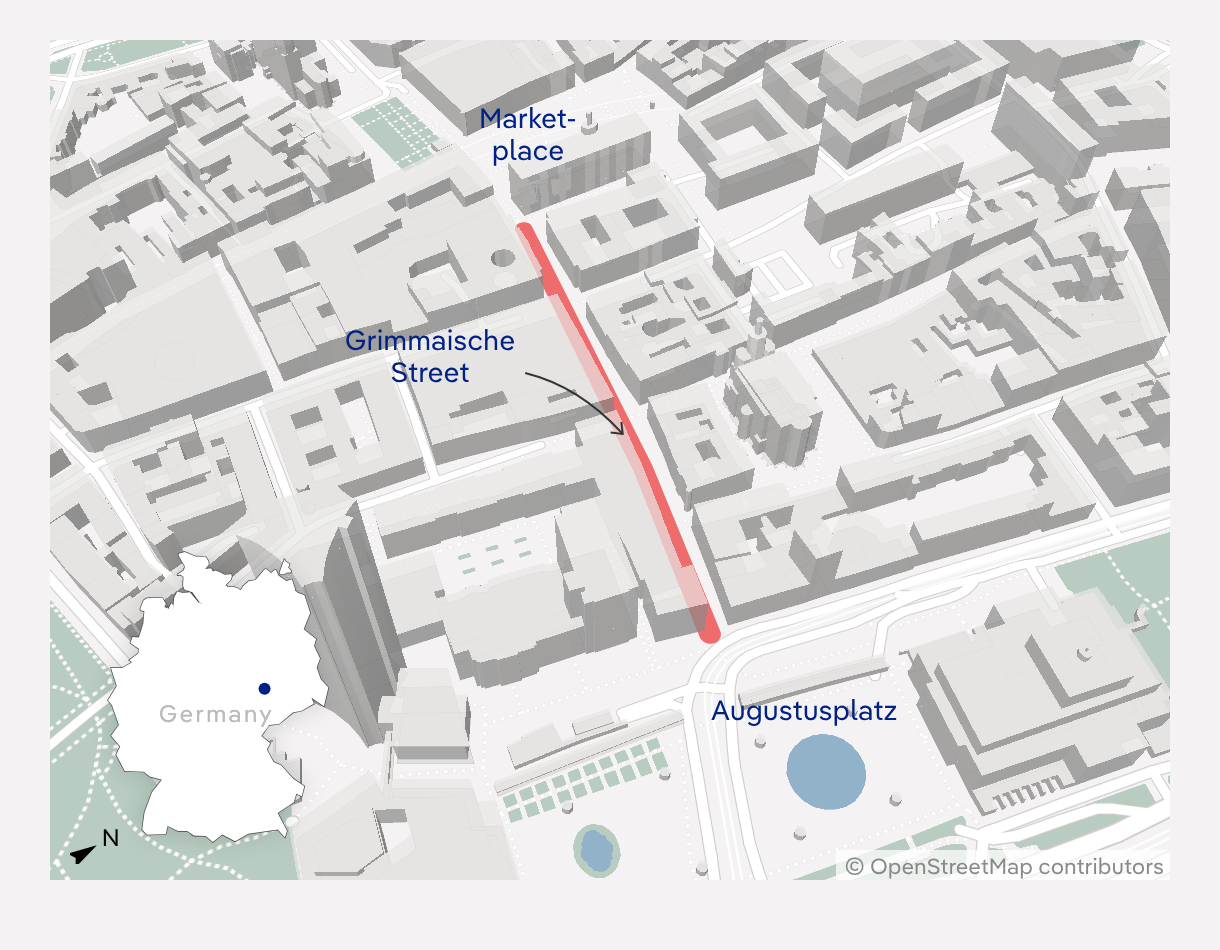
The route of the car

The involved vehicle, a Volkswagen Taigo, collided twice with passersby in pedestrian zones, driving through Augustusplatz, Grimmaische Strasse and the Markt before fleeing the scene. Witnesses estimated the speed of the car as between 70 and 80 km/h (43 and 50 mph) or 100 and 130 km/h (62 and 81 mph). A person, initially described as a young woman or girl, but later identified as an elderly woman, was seen on the car's bonnet. Around 40 firefighters and 40 paramedics, together with two helicopters were dispatched to the scene.

The driver, a 33-year-old man, was arrested near St. Thomas Church, 500 metres (1,600 ft) from the starting point. The driver had crashed into a bollard, causing a woman, who was clinging to the car's roof, to fall off and hit the ground. A passing doctor rendered first aid while a group of about 15 bystanders, described as refugee residents and cab drivers from a nearby taxi stand, subdued the driver, who had locked himself inside the vehicle. After attempts to smash open the windows failed, one member of the group, an Algerian cab driver, convinced the driver to open the door before dragging him out and keeping the driver restrained on the ground. The cab driver prevented others from assaulting the driver, who was handed over to a police officer and another bystander to be escorted to a police vehicle.

== Victims ==
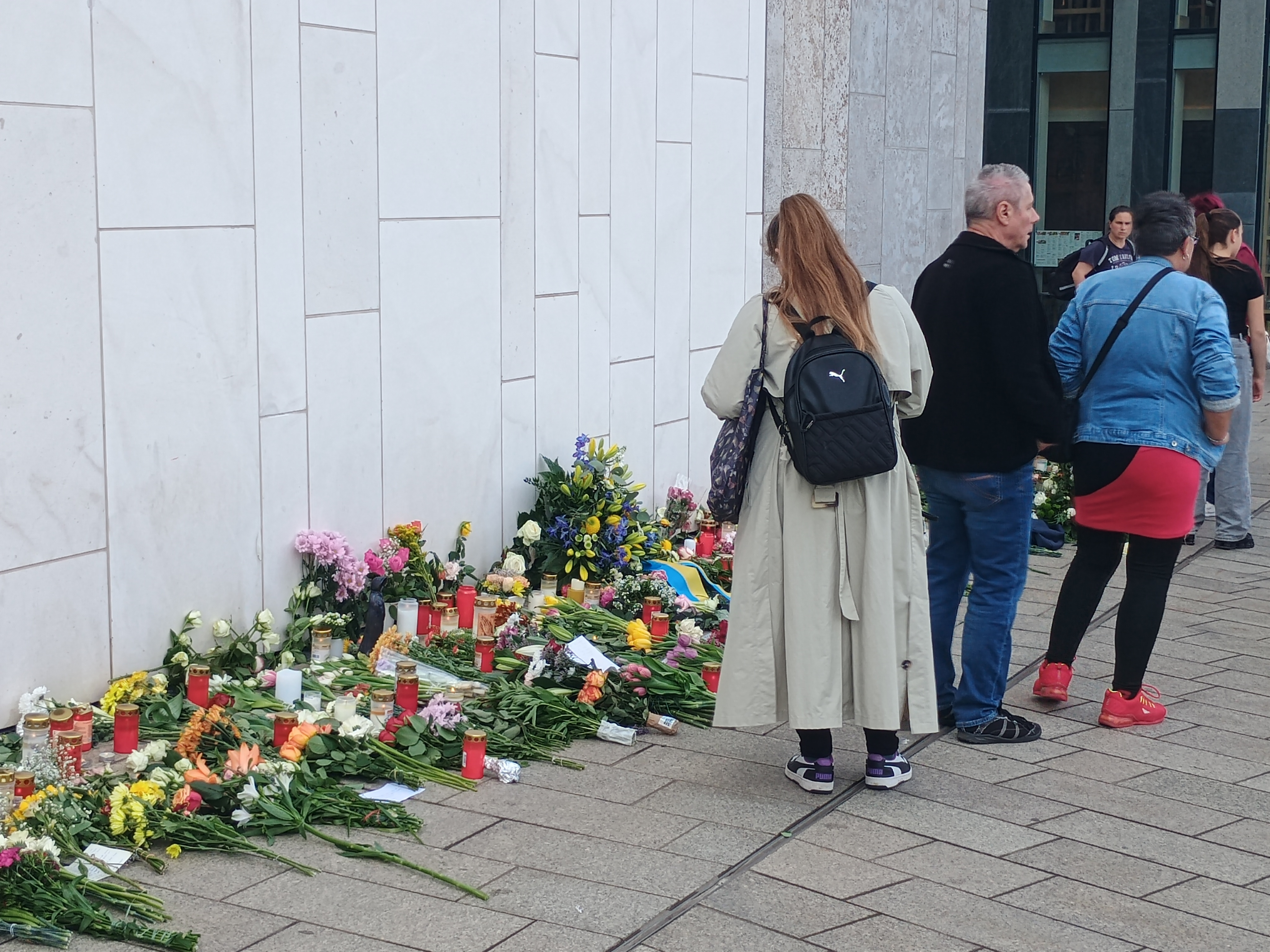
People viewing floral tributes left on the side of the University Church, St. Pauli (Paulinum)

The two fatal victims were a 77-year-old man from Leipzig and a 63-year-old woman from Coburg district. Both were German citizens and died shortly after being struck by the car. The female fatality had clung to the top of the car and died after falling during the last crash.

The Leipzig Crisis Intervention Team, a pastoral care organisation, stated that eighty people had used their services after being affected by the incident, 20 of whom may have been physically injured. At the time, three seriously injured and two lightly injured were identified. Police and the state prosecutor's office stated that no official injury toll was established, as many people left the scene on their own and may have treated any injuries in private. On 6 May, it was announced that there were six injuries, aged 21 to 87, with two severe injuries, all of whom had been stabilised. One of the severely injured was the husband of the killed woman. The youngest of the injured was a Venezuelan citizen, previously misidentified as Spanish. Fire department chief Axel Schuh credited on-site first aid by bystanders, both medically trained and lay persons, with preventing worsening injuries.

== Accused ==
The suspect was identified as a 33-year-old Jeffrey K. and described as a heavily tattooed bald man. He was born in Germany and a resident of the Leipzig region. He had a prior criminal record, most recently for threats and insults in April 2026, as well as two convictions for assault and violating anti-mask law during a football game in 2014.

Since February 2026, Jeffrey K. had been separated from his girlfriend, who stated that he had subjected her to psychological abuse and threatened physical violence since late 2025. Jugendamt ruled in March that both were to maintain joint custody over their child. On 16 April, his ex-girlfriend called police because he had threatened to kill her parents at the order of voices in his head. In a follow-up call, Jeffrey K. corroborated her account and asked officers for a ride to voluntarily check himself into a mental hospital. He was held in a psychiatric facility in Schkeuditz from 17 to 29 April and diagnosed with acute psychosis. Jeffrey K. was released after stationary treatment as he was not considered a danger to himself or others, despite police telling Jugendamt about potential child endangerment due to Jeffrey K.'s aggressive tendencies. A few hours after his release from the psychiatric facility, his ex-girlfriend reported Jeffrey K. for showing up unannounced at her residence to see their child, though he vacated the premises without incident when police asked him to leave.

== Investigation ==
The day of the incident, the public prosecutor's office filed charges for two counts of murder and two counts of attempted murder against the driver. On 5 May, the driver was charged with two counts of murder and four counts of attempted murder. He was remanded to a psychiatric hospital due to suspicions that he was in a state of severely diminished capacity.

It is still unclear whether it was a deliberate attack or an accident. Senior public prosecutor Claudia Laube said that her office was treating the incident as a "rampage act", stating there were "no hints for any other interpretation" while ruling out the possibility of co-conspirators. Investigators ruled out an ideological motive, whether political or religious, and stated there were hints to a "crime of passion". Focus cited internal sources that a domestic argument was being investigated as a potential triggering event. On 7 May, police spokesperson Olaf Hoppe stated that potential premeditation was being investigated, as it was found that the driver had previously threatened his ex-girlfriend and her social circle on 17 April in a chat message stating "It's been a long time since a car has been driven into a crowd".

In August 2026, the investigation was completed and the charges were updated to two counts of murder, eight counts of aggravated assault, 85 counts of attempted murder, and 91 counts of aggravated dangerous interference with road traffic, citing evidence for treachery, base motives, and killing with means dangerous to the public. A psychiatric assessor found no signs that the suspect was mentally inhibited at the time of the crime and judged him fit to stand trial, which is set to take place at Landgericht Leipzig.

== Aftermath ==
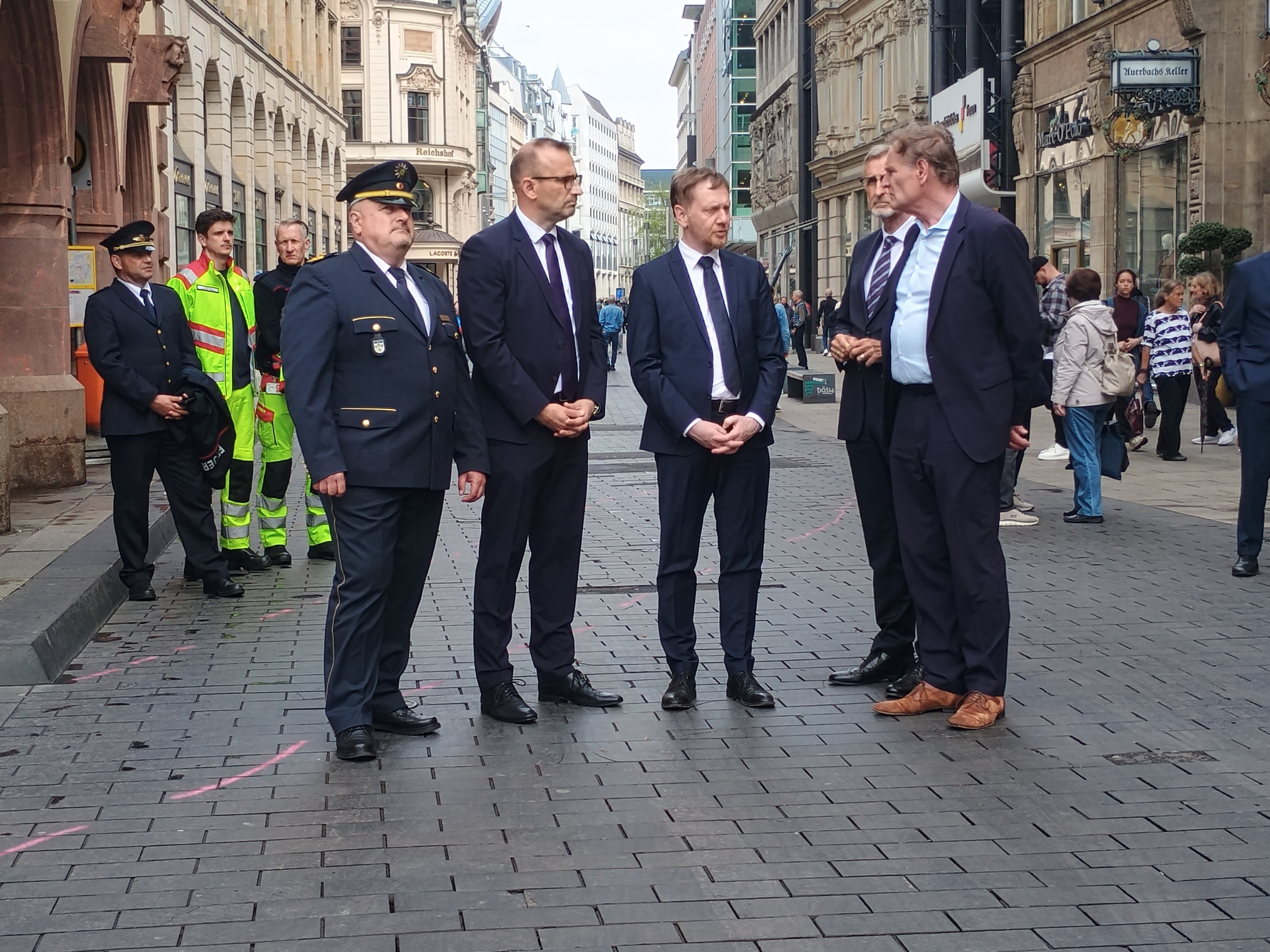
Michael Kretschmer, Burkhard Jung, Armin Schuster and other officials visit the scene, the day after the incident.

The area from Augustusplatz to St. Thomas Church was closed off, with public transport being rerouted. St. Nicholas Church prepared an ecumenical memorial service for 5 May to remember the victims. On 6 May, additional bollards were installed at the southern entry way of Grimmaische Strasse, with a planned overhaul of the inner city's security concepts. The city of Leipzig has also planned multiple official commemoration events for the following days.

=== Reactions ===
Minister President of Saxony Michael Kretschmer immediately expressed his condolences to the victims and their families. Kretschmer described the incident as a "presumed vehicular rampage". Saxon Interior Minister Armin Schuster made a public statement reassuring residents that the threat situation was resolved, also calling for unity and referring to the driver as an "amok perpetrator".

== Misinformation ==
The police warned the public of "unverified reports and photos." It urged people to use only verified sources. In an early report, Radio Leipzig cited eyewitnesses who stated that a stabbing had also occurred, which police denied. Before police made official statements regarding the driver's identity, social media users claimed that the driver was a 31-year-old man of Afghan descent, citing a non-existent French broadcaster, or a "left-wing Syrian". The false information persisted, further claiming that police had declared a terrorist incident and that mainstream media were lying about the driver's German nationality. Several online users still questioned whether the suspect was ethnically German based on his first name Jeffrey; Leipziger Volkszeitung editor Josa Mania-Schlegel noted that American first names were extremely popular in East Germany.

Various edited images of both the driver and an unrelated man wearing t-shirts with logos of the Alternative for Germany (AfD) and Antifa were spread online. Mimikama determined that the original post, showing a supposed screenshot by a non-existent American-based Instagram account, was created with an Instagram post template through the AI-generated stock image service Magnific. The images with Antifa imagery were subsequently reposted, including by figures such as Alexander, Prince of Schaumburg-Lippe, who later deleted the post and stated that he first believed its authenticity "because the AI [Grok] told me the image was real". A widely shared TikTok video falsely presented a video compilation of protests as a pro-AfD rally in Leipzig with 50,000 participants for snap elections on the day of the incident, when the videos actually showed protests in opposition to AfD from other cities such as Nuremberg and Kassel, dubbed over with audio from Dynamo Dresden football fan rallys.
