= Gisela Engeln-Müllges =

German mathematician and artist (1940–2026)

Gisela Engeln-Müllges (1940 – 31 January 2026) was a German mathematician and artist. She was a professor of numerical mathematics at the Aachen University of Applied Sciences, where she also was a vice rector for research, development, and technology.

== Education and academic career ==
Engeln-Müllges was born in Leipzig in 1940. After World War II, Leipzig became part of East Germany (the German Democratic Republic), and Engeln-Müllges escaped to the west in 1961. She studied mathematics at RWTH Aachen University beginning in 1961, and completed a doctorate (Dr. rer. nat.) in 1971, with a dissertation Fluchtebenennomogramme zur Darstellung von Funktionensystemen: Ihre Theorie und praktische Verwendbarkeit concerning numerical analysis.

She was a professor at the Aachen University of Applied Sciences from 1982, and was vice rector there from 1992 to 2005. With Frank Uhlig, she was the author of the books Numerik-Algorithmen mit C and Numerik-Algorithmen mit Fortran (7th ed., 1993, translated into English as Numerical Algorithms with Fortran and Numerical Algorithms with C, Springer, 1996).

== Art ==
Engeln-Müllges's artworks are abstract, and include both paintings and cast-metal sculptures, based on her many years of work with artist Benno Werth. In 2019, she was one of the selected artists for the London Art Biennale.

== Death ==
Engeln-Müllges died on 31 January 2026, at the age of 85.

== Recognition ==
Engeln-Müllges was awarded the Federal Cross of Merit in 1992. In 2005, she was given an honorary doctorate by Nizhny Novgorod State Technical University.
