= Dieter Wunderlich =

German linguist (1937–2026)

Dieter Wunderlich (14 June 1937 – 6 June 2026) was a German linguist and an Elected Fellow of the American Association for the Advancement of Science.

Wunderlich was born in Rostock on 14 June 1937. He wrote papers on phonology, syntax, and grammar. Wunderlich died on 6 June 2026, at the age of 88.
