= Martin Willich =

German politician (1945–2026)

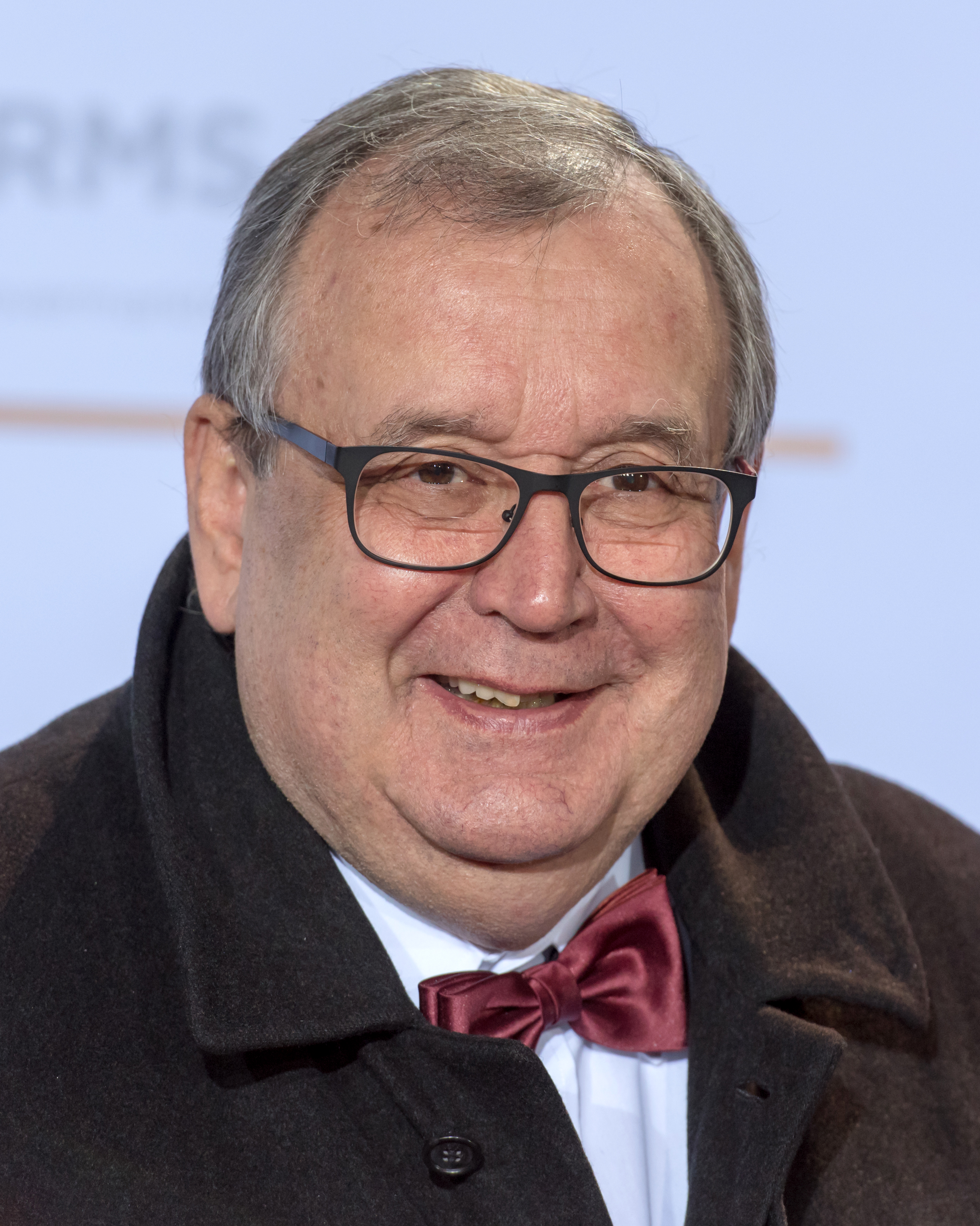
- Willich in 2016

Member of the Hamburg Parliament
- In office 3 March 1974 – 1995

Personal details
- Born: Martin Walter Willich; 24 April 1945 Erfurt, Germany
- Died: 12 January 2026 (aged 80) Hamburg, Germany
- Party: CDU
- Education: University of Hamburg (Dr. jur.)
- Occupation: Judge

Martin Willich (24 April 1945 – 12 January 2026) was a German politician. A member of the Christian Democratic Union, he served in the Hamburg Parliament from 1974 to 1995.

Willich died in Hamburg on 12 January 2026, at the age of 80.
