= Wolfgang Gust =

German journalist and historian (1935–2026)

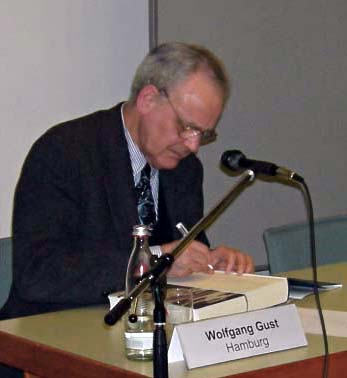
Gust signing his book about the Armenian genocide, in Mülheim, Germany

Wolfgang Gust (9 April 1935 – 9 June 2026) was a German journalist, historian, author and chief of heading for magazine Der Spiegel.

== Life and career ==
Wolfgang Gust was born in Hanover on 9 April 1935. He studied Romanistik in Freiburg, Bonn and Toulouse (France) and marketing and management in Hamburg. He worked at Der Spiegel starting in 1965, first as editor of economics and then as a foreign editor. At the beginning of 1970 he went to Paris as chief correspondent, and became deputy foreign editor in 1977. In 1981 he directed the department of books. He was the author of the series on Mountainous Karabagh and the Armenian genocide. After 1993 he became a freelance journalist and author.

He examined the publication by Protestant minister Johannes Lepsius of documents of the German foreign office related to the Armenian genocide and disclosed various omissions and falsifications that covered for German responsibility. He published the wording of the original documents, including English translation, as well as the individual manipulations in armenocide.net in co-operation with his wife in March 2000. Three years later, he published hundreds of further Federal Foreign Office documents in the same portal. In 2005 he published a selection of the most important documents.

Gust received the Garbis Papazian prize, given to support non-Armenians who contribute to the propagation of Armenian causes. He died on 9 June 2026, at the age of 91.

== Works ==
- Der Völkermord an den Armeniern: Die Tragödie des ältesten Christenvolks der Welt. Hanser Verlag, 1993, ISBN 3-446-17373-0.
- Das Imperium der Sultane. Eine Geschichte des Osmanischen Reichs. Carl Hanser Verlag, München 1995 ISBN 3-446-17374-9.
- Der Völkermord an den Armeniern 1915/16. Dokumente aus dem Politischen Archiv des deutschen Auswärtigen Amts, Verlag zu Klampen, 2005, ISBN 3-934920-59-4.
