= Udo Margedant =

German political scientist (1942–2026)

President of the Cartellverband
- In office 2005–2012
- Preceded by: Max Hanecke
- Succeeded by: Michael Bruno Klein

Personal details
- Born: 17 June 1942 Neuwied, Gau Moselland, Nazi Germany
- Died: 26 July 2026 (aged 84)
- Education: Goethe University Frankfurt
- Known for: President of Cartellverband

Udo Margedant (17 June 1942 – 26 July 2026) was a German political scientist and author. He was the founder of Landeszentrale für politische Bildung in Mecklenburg-Vorpommern.

== Life and career ==
Udo Margedant was born in Neuwied on 17 June 1942. He studied political science at Goethe University Frankfurt. During his studies in 1962, he joined the Catholic student fraternity. In 1968, he got a doctorate degree at Frankfurt with a dissertation in philosophy. He became a professor for social history and social philosophy at the University of Wuppertal. In 1992, he served as the first director of the State Center for Civic Education in Mecklenburg-Vorpommern. He then worked for the Konrad Adenauer Foundation until 2005.

In 2004, Margedant co-authored a German federalism reform alongside representatives from many political foundations. He also contributed to the Bundestag Commission analyzing the East Germany education system and served as a co-author and editor of educational materials on parliamentarism and the Weimar Republic. Margedant was also president of the Cartellverband in Bad Honnef from 2005 to 2012, succeeding Max Hanecke.

Margedant died on 26 July 2026, at the age of 84.
