= Ludwig Sebus =

German singer (born 1925)

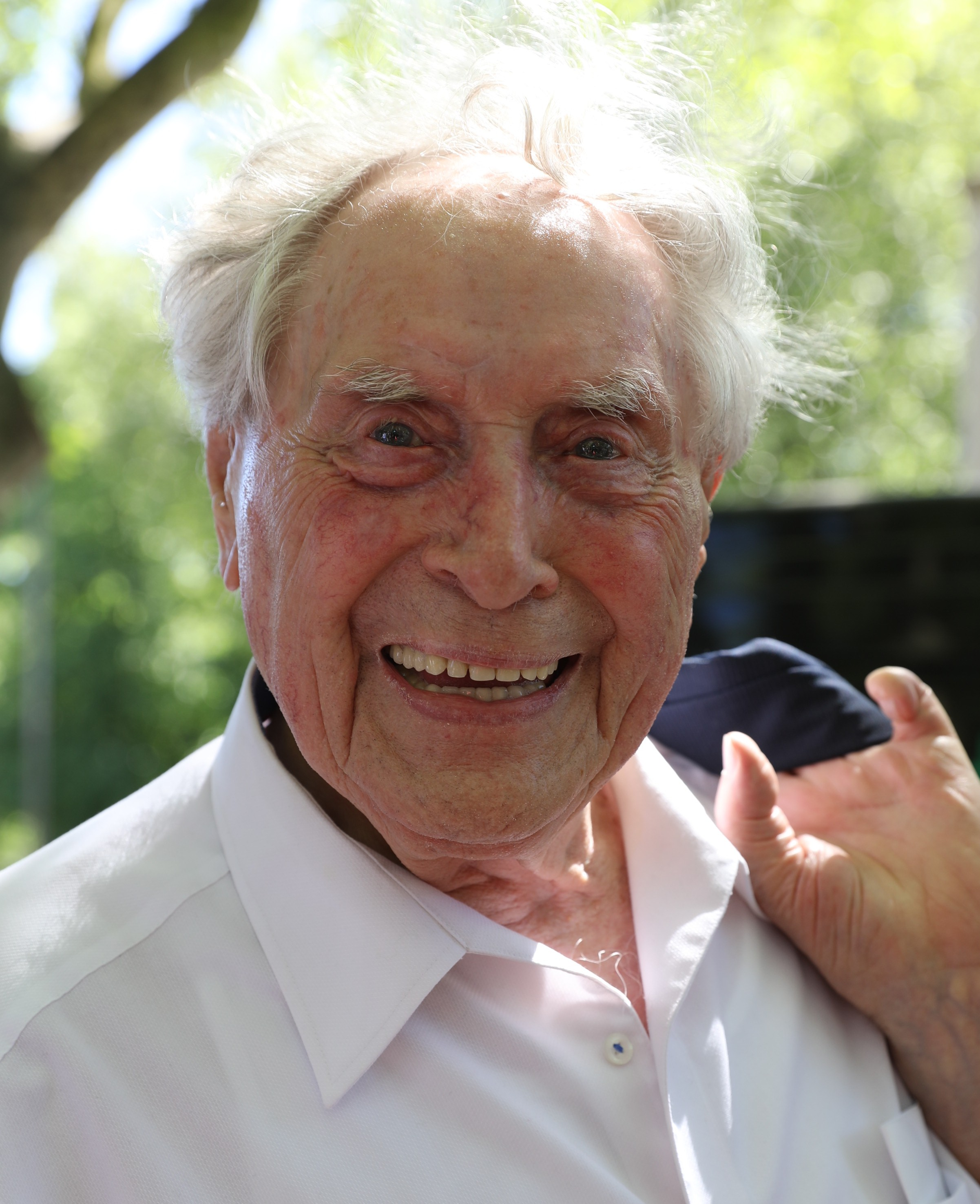
- Sebus in 2018

Background information
- Born: September 5, 1925 (age 100); Cologne, Germany
- Genres: Schlager; Folk music
- Occupations: Singer; composer; lyricist
- Instrument: Voice
- Years active: 1956–present
- Spouse: Lilo Sebus (m. 1956; died 2019)

Ludwig Sebus (born 5 September 1925) is a German singer, composer, and lyricist.

== Early life and career ==
Sebus was born 1925. He grew up as the son of a gilder in Cologne. In 1943 he was drafted as a soldier and came to Russia, from where he returned to Cologne from captivity at the end of 1949. In 1959 he joined the Altermarktspielkreis, after which he applied to the literary committee of the Cologne Carnival Festival Committee and was prepared for three years for his upcoming stage appearances.

He had his first mayor success in 1955 session with the song Jede Stein in Kölle eß e Stöck vun deer. Since then he has performed regularly at the Cologne Carnival and many of his performances and concerts have been broadcast on television and radio, such as the concert for his 70th birthday in the Cologne Philharmonic. Over the decades he has written various songs both for himself and for other performers, including various marches for carnival societies and dance corps.

In later years he often performed with others interpreters of the Cologne Carnival under the name Melodienregien and sang his own song as well as classics of the Cologne songs by Willi Ostermann, Gerhard Jussenhoven, Karl Berbuer and others.

== Personal life ==
Sebus was married to his wife Lilo from 1956 until her death in 2019. They had four children, nine grandchildren and eight great-grandchildren.

== Honors ==
On the occasion of a celebratory event organized by the WDR in honor of Ludwig Sebus on October 18, 2020, the Vice President of the Cologne Carnival Festival Committee, Dr. Joachim Wüst, announced that a fountain named after him would be erected in Cologne-Deutz as a present for Ludwig Sebus' 95th birthday. The Deutz Historical Park between the LVR building and the restored defense tower near the Rheinboulevard is being considered as a location.

== Discography ==
- Schön bruchste hück nit uszesinn (1952)
- Jede Stein en Kölle (es e Stöck vun dir) (1955)
- Kölle bei Naach (1955)
- Et Zebingemännche (1956)
- D’r Decke Pitter (1957)
- Wann ahl Schöre brenne (1958)
- Räächs un links vum Rhing (1958)
- Dä ahle Kusteiebaum (1959)
- Et Poozeleed (1961)
- Am Ostermann-Brunnen (1962)
- Uns kölsche Siel (1964)
- Wat e Paar Bein (De Fleutmanns) (1968)
- Prinz, Bauer, Jungfrau (1971)
- Et Rhein-Panorama – Luur ens vun Düx noh Kölle (1972)
- Tünnes un Schäl (1975)
- Nee, wat is dat hee ne miese Lade (1976)
- Och Verwandte, dat sin Minsche (1977)
- Nur e klein Milljönche (1978)
- Grietche maach et Finster op (1978)
- Un wann d’r Decke Pitter lügg (1980)
- Wann et Muuze-Mändelcher gitt (1980)
- Circus Colonia (1981)
- Wer hat Dornröschen wachgeküsst (Märchenprinz us Kölle) (1983)
- Em Martinsveedel (1983)
- Gangk ens en d’r Zoo un jröss mer ding Verwandte (1985)
- De Fründschaff halde mer stets huh (1985)
- Ihrefelder Heimatleed (Marsch der Bürgergarde blau-gold) (1986)
- Wer einmol nor dorch Kölle geit (1987)
- Kölsche Polonäs (1991)
- Et Stroßefess (1993)
- En Landpartie (1994)
- Ja, hier am Rhein bin ich geboren (1994)
- Alles su widder du (2020)
- Nit mieh janz su knusprig (2021)
