= Thomas Fey =

German orchestral conductor (1960–2026)

- Fey, in 2011
- Born: 9 November 1960
- Died: 27 June 2026 (aged 65)
- Occupation: Conductor
- Organizations: Heidelberger Sinfoniker; Mannheimer Mozartorchester

Thomas Fey (9 November 1960 – 27 June 2026) was a German orchestral conductor. He became a specialist for performing music from the classical period on instruments of the time with ensembles that he founded, beginning projects to record the complete symphonies by Joseph Haydn and Beethoven.

== Life and career ==
Fey was born on 9 November 1960. He first studied music and conducting at the University of Music and Performing Arts Mannheim. He studied further at the Salzburg Mozarteum, especially historically informed performance practice with Nikolaus Harnoncourt. He also attended master classes with Leonard Bernstein at the Schleswig-Holstein Music Festival.

In 1985, while still a student, he founded the Heidelberg Motet Choir and in 1987 the Schlierbach Chamber Orchestra, which was renamed the Heidelberger Sinfoniker in 1993, giving their first concert on 1 January 1994. Fey began to record the complete symphonies by Joseph Haydn for the Hänssler Classic label, recording 58 of the 104 symphonies. He also embarked on a project to record the symphonies by Beethoven. A volume of the Fourth and Sixth Symphonies was regarded by a reviewer from Classics Today as "the most arrestingly detailed, vibrantly executed, emotionally generous, and utterly alive performances" of these symphonies he had heard in a long time.

In 2003, Fey founded a period instruments ensemble, La Passione, dedicated to Baroque music and the Mannheimer Mozartorchester. The orchestra, playing on period instruments only for the brass and timpani, played its inaugural concert on Mozart's 250th birthday on 27 January 2006. Fey initiated the “Mozart Week Festival” in Heidelberg and recorded many works by Mozart with the orchestra. They also recorded overtures, ballet music and stage music by Antonio Salieri; one of the volumes was nominated for a Grammy Award in the category best orchestra recording.

In October 2014, Fey suffered a severe traumatic brain injury from a fall. It was hoped that he would recover and be well enough to rejoin the orchestra at the beginning of 2016, but his health prevented him from ever doing so.

Fey died on 27 June 2026, at the age of 65.
