= Peter Radunski =

German politician (1939–2026)

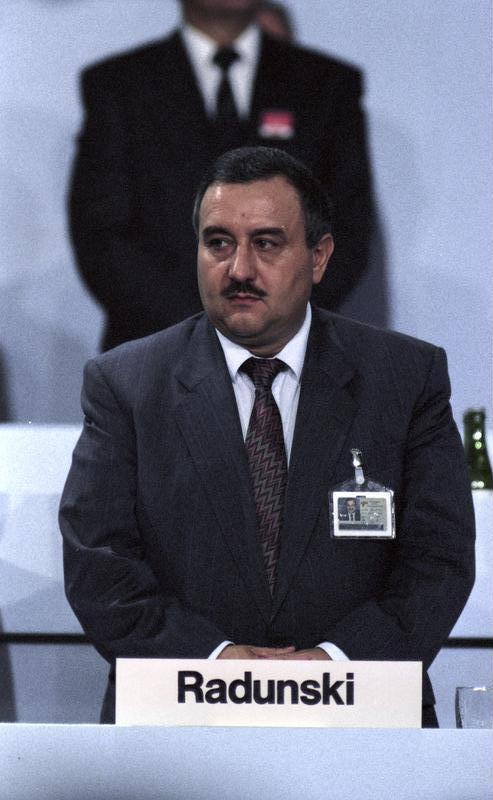
Radunski in 1989

Peter Radunski (13 March 1939 – 19 January 2026) was a German CDU politician and political consultant. He served as the Senator for Federal and European Affairs from 1991 to 1995 and as the Senator for Science, Research, and Culture of the state of Berlin from 1996 to 1999. Additionally, he was a member of the Berlin House of Representatives from 1999 to 2001.

== Early life ==
Radunski was born in Berlin on 13 March 1939. He completed his secondary education (Abitur) at the Friedrich-Ebert-Schule in Berlin in 1958. Between 1958 and 1967, he pursued studies in law, history, romance languages, and political sciences in Berlin, Bonn, and Strasbourg. In 1967, he successfully passed his diploma examination at the Otto-Suhr-Institut of the Free University of Berlin.

== Career ==
While studying, from 1964 to 1968, he worked as a press and fundamental principles officer in the RCDS (Ring Christlich-Demokratischer Studenten) Federal Board. From 1965 to 1967, he served as a consultant for the Berlin Visitor Service in the Federal Ministry for All-German Affairs. In 1967, he became the first full-time Federal Managing Director of RCDS. Following this role, from 1967 to 1969, he was the deputy head of the Scientific Institute of the Konrad-Adenauer-Stiftung. Later, he worked as a department head for political fundamental questions in the Hessian regional association of the CDU. Between 1971 and 1973, he held the position of department head for special purposes at the CDU Federal Office. Following this, from 1973 to 1981, he served as the head of Department III for Public Relations at the CDU Federal Office in Bonn. From 1981 to 1991, he was the Federal Managing Director of the CDU until his appointment as Senator of the State of Berlin in 1991.

In 1992, he received a teaching assignment at the Otto-Suhr-Institut of the Free University of Berlin on the subject of election campaign organization. Furthermore, in 1995, he held a guest professorship in Political Science at the University of Innsbruck.

== Politics ==
During his studies in 1961, Peter Radunski joined the Ring Christlich Demokratischer Studenten (Ring of Christian Democratic Students). Four years later, in 1965, he became a member of the CDU (Christian Democratic Union) and the Young Union. While studying at the Free University of Berlin, he was part of the so-called K-Group (a faction of the right-wing within the CDU) alongside Peter Kittelmann, Eberhard Diepgen, Klaus-Rüdiger Landowsky, Heinrich Lummer, and others.

From 1982 to 1990, Radunski was a member of the ZDF Television Council. From 2001 to 2003, he served on the Broadcasting Council of SFB (Berlin). Since 2005, he has been a member of the advisory board of the magazine politik&kommunikation, the journal for political consulting, and the ProDialog initiative.

== Public offices ==
In 1991, he was appointed Senator for Federal and European Affairs of the State of Berlin. Later, from 1996 to 1999, he served as Senator for Science, Research, and Culture and was a member of the Federal Council as Berlin's representative and a member of the Mediation Committee. After resigning as senator for health reasons, he was a member of the Berlin House of Representatives from 1999 to 2001.

As the Senator for Science, he initiated the university contracts, which are now the basis for the relationships between many state governments and their universities. As the Senator for Culture, he published a comprehensive assessment of Berlin's cultural policy (Kreisepapier). He chaired many foundation boards and supervisory boards, including the Prussian Palaces and Gardens Foundation, Topography of Terror, City Museum, Berlinische Galerie, and Bröhan Museum. Additionally, he chaired the boards of trustees of all universities and colleges.

== Political consulting ==
From 1983 to 1992, Radunski was a member of the Political Bureau of the European People's Party (EPP). Additionally, from 1987 to 1996, he was the head of the EDU Campaign Commission (European Democratic Union). He managed all CDU federal and European election campaigns from 1976 to 1990. Radunski, from the federal office, was involved in shaping almost all state elections of the CDU in the seventies and eighties.

As a senior consultant at Publicis from 2001 to 2009, he advised, among others, the following minister-presidents: Erwin Teufel (Baden-Württemberg), Georg Milbradt (Saxony), Wolfgang Böhmer (Saxony-Anhalt), and Christian Wulff (Lower Saxony). Additionally, he advised the state associations of Berlin, Bremen, Rhineland-Palatinate, and Mecklenburg-Western Pomerania in their state elections. From 2002 to 2004, Radunski advised new democratic parties in Central and Eastern Europe in preparation for the European elections, including Hungary, Poland, Estonia, Lithuania, the Czech Republic, and Slovakia.

== Trivia ==
Partially acknowledging, partially polemical, Radunski was titled "Kugelblitz" (ball of lightning) and "Zigeunerbaron" (Gypsy baron) in Berlin media during his time as a senator.

== Death ==
Radunski died on 19 January 2026, at the age of 86.

== Awards ==
In 2009, he was awarded the Federal Cross of Merit, 1st Class.

== Literature ==
- Radunski, Peter (2014). Aus der politischen Kulisse: mein Beruf zur Politik (1. Aufl ed.). Berlin Kassel: B & S Siebenhaar-Verl. ISBN 978-3-943132-27-4.
- Dagger, Steffen; Greiner, Christoph; Leinert, Kirsten; Meliß, Nadine; Menzel, Anne, eds. (2004). Politikberatung in Deutschland: Praxis und Perspektiven (1. Auflage ed.). Wiesbaden: VS Verlag für Sozialwissenschaften. ISBN 978-3-531-14464-1.
- Leif, Thomas; Speth, Rudolf, eds. (2003). Die stille Macht: Lobbyismus in Deutschland (1. Aufl ed.). Wiesbaden: Westdt. Verl. ISBN 978-3-531-14132-9.
- Bender, Gunnar; Reulecke, Lutz (2004). Handbuch des deutschen Lobbyisten: wie ein modernes und transparentes Politikmanagement funktioniert. Frankfurter Allgemeine Buch im F.A.Z.-Institut. Martin David Ledwon (2. Auflage ed.). Frankfurt am Main: F.A.Z.-Inst. für Management-, Markt- und Medieninformationen. ISBN 978-3-89981-005-9.
- Bertrams, Helge (2004). Die Haftung des Aufsichtsrats im Zusammenhang mit dem Deutschen Corporate Governance Kodex und § 161 AktG. Duncker & Humblot. ISBN 978-3-428-51541-7.
- Alemann, Ulrich von; Fonteyn, Reiner; Lange, Hans-Jürgen (1989). Organisierte Interessen in der Bundesrepublik. Grundwissen Politik (2., durchges. Aufl ed.). Opladen: Leske + Budrich. ISBN 978-3-8100-0790-2.
