= Bund Deutscher Orgelbaumeister =

The BDO (Bund Deutscher Orgelbaumeister, or Federation of German Master Organ Builders), established in 1895, is a professional association of organ builders and related businesses located in Germany. Its membership currently includes over one hundred German workshops.
