= Wattenberg (Habichtswald) =

Mountain in Germany

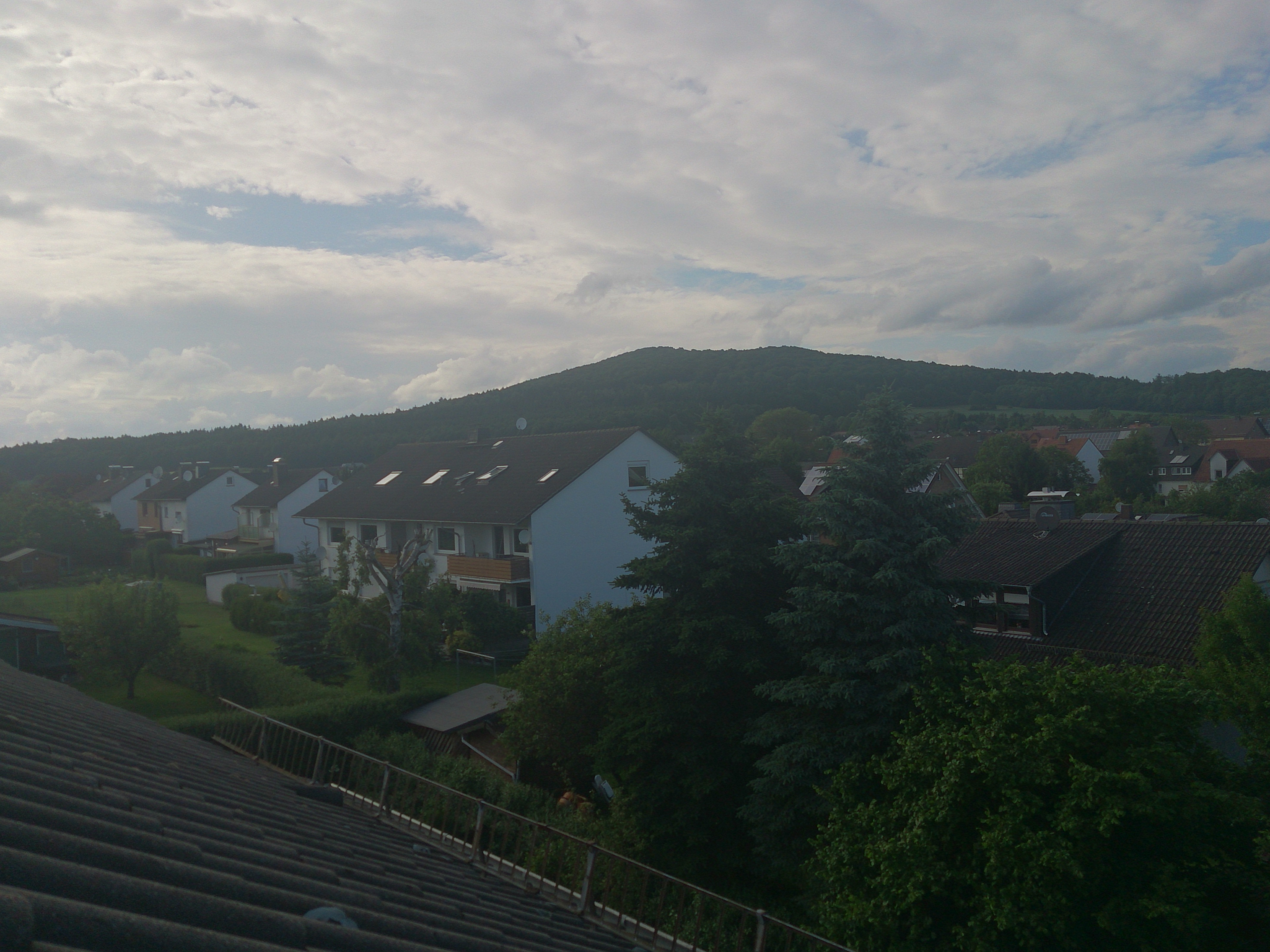
- The Wattenberg photographed from Martinhagen (south-> north), Martinhagen partially visible

Highest point
- Elevation: 516.2 m (1,694 ft)
- Coordinates: 51°17′48″N 9°16′27″E

Geography
- Location within Hesse
- Location: Hesse, Germany

Wattenberg is a mountain located in Hesse, Germany.
