= Ingeborg Kaiser =

German-Swiss writer (1930–2026)

Ingeborg Kaiser (7 August 1930 – 6 June 2026) was a German–Swiss writer.

== Life and work ==
Kaiser was born on 7 August 1930 in Neuburg an der Donau, and moved to Basel in 1960. Throughout her career she published a number of poetry and prose collections.

Her works are stored in the Swiss Literature Archive in Bern.

Kaiser died on 6 June 2026, at the age of 95.
