= Heinz-Jürgen Koloczek =

German politician (1943–2026)

Heinz-Jürgen Koloczek (8 November 1943 – 9 June 2026) was a German politician.

== Life and career ==
Koloczek was born in Burg, near Magdeburg on 8 November 1943. He was a member of the Christian Democratic Union of Germany party. He served as the mayor of Tuttlingen from 1980 to 2004.

Koloczek died on 9 June 2026, at the age of 82.

== Awards ==
- 1994: Order of Merit of the Federal Republic of Germany
- 2004: Federal Cross of Merit
