= Schlecht =

Schlecht (from Old High German sleht "even", "direct" or "natural" (cognate with Old English sliht)) is a German surname belonging to the group of family names based on a personal characteristic, in this case derived from a nickname originally used for a straightforward person. Like the variant Schlicht it arose before the semantic change of s(ch)le(c)ht/s(ch)li(c)ht from the rather positive "straight", "plain", "simple", "well" to present-day "bad", "evil", "wicked" in the 15th century and may also be habitational in origin, stemming from several small settlements with that name (from sleht in the sense "flat").
Notable people with the name include:

- Erma Schlecht (1919–2009), American real-estate broker and survivor of the Tenerife airport collision
- Charles Schlecht (1843-1905) American artist and currency engraver
- Hans Schlecht (born 1948), Austrian retired slalom canoeist
- Johann Schlecht (died 1500), German Roman Catholic bishop
- Julia Schlecht (born 1980), German former volleyball player
- Martin Schlecht (former 1976), German cinematographer
