= Christoph Luitpold Frommel =

German art historian (1933–2026)

- Born: 25 September 1933; Heidelberg, Gau Baden, Germany
- Died: 11 February 2026 (aged 92); Rome, Italy
- Education: LMU Munich; University of Bonn
- Occupation: Art historian

Christoph Luitpold Frommel (25 September 1933 – 11 February 2026) was a German art historian.

== Life and career ==
Christoph Luitpold Frommel was the son of composer Gerhard Frommel and the grandson of theologian Otto Frommel. After he studied at LMU Munich and the University of Bonn, he served as director of the Bibliotheca Hertziana in Rome. He was married to fellow art historian Sabine Frommel.

He was a member of the Accademia dei Lincei and the Accademia di San Luca. He was named a Grand Officer of the Order of Merit of the Italian Republic in 1999.

Frommel died in Rome on 11 February 2026, at the age of 92.
