= Dietrich Stratmann =

German politician (1937–2026)

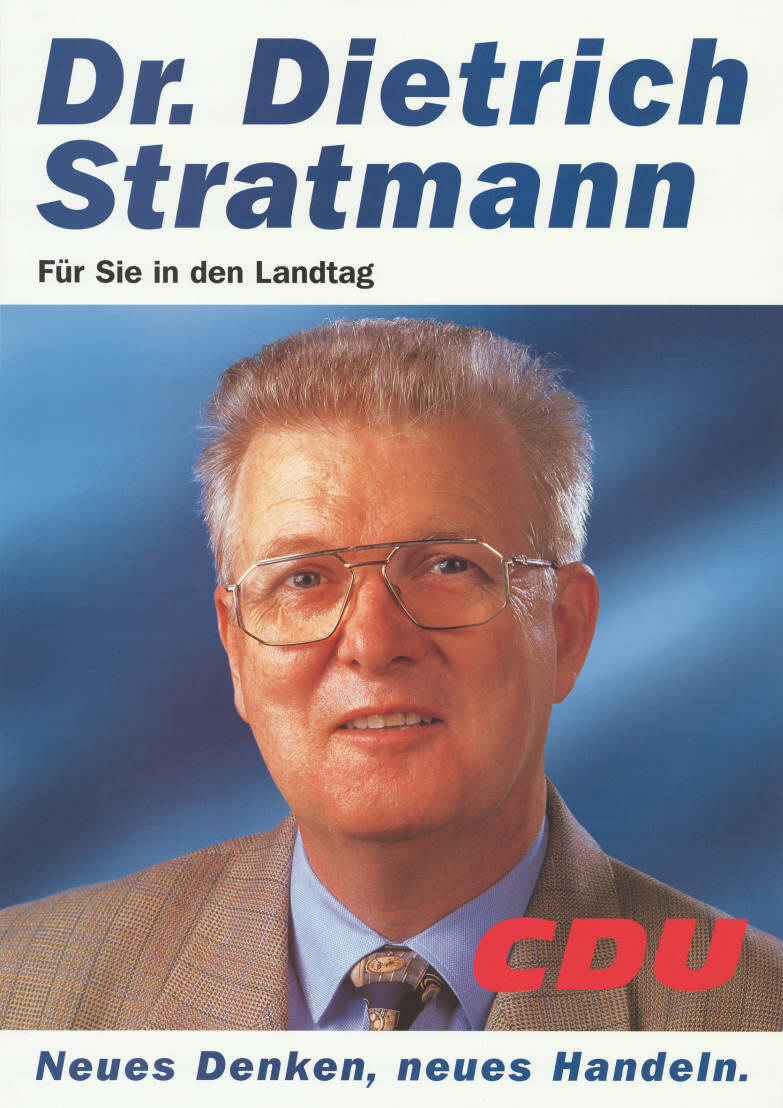
- 1998 Stratmann campaign poster

Member of the Landtag of Lower Saxony
- In office 21 June 1982 – 4 March 2003

Personal details
- Born: 4 September 1937 Berlin, Germany
- Died: 7 January 2026 (aged 88)
- Party: CDU
- Education: Technische Universität Berlin; University of Göttingen
- Occupation: Physicist

Dietrich Stratmann (4 September 1937 – 7 January 2026) was a German politician. A member of the Christian Democratic Union, he served in the Landtag of Lower Saxony from 1982 to 2003.

Stratmann died on 7 January 2026, at the age of 88.
