= Herbert Möller =

German politician (1923–2026)

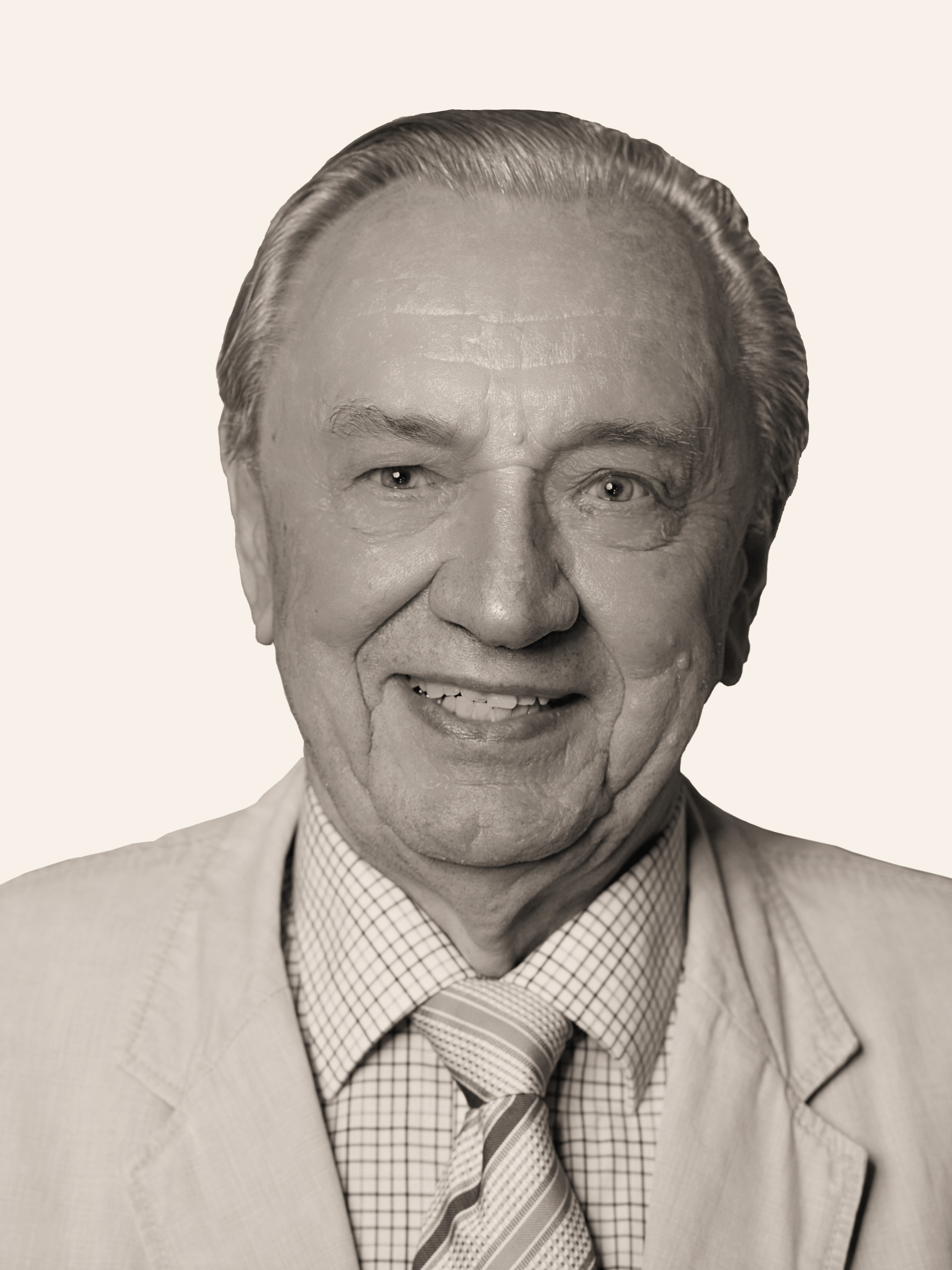

Member of the Landtag of Schleswig-Holstein
- In office 17 December 1985 – 2 October 1987

Personal details
- Born: 7 April 1923 Vratislavice nad Nisou, Czechoslovakia
- Died: 3 June 2026 (aged 103) Neumünster, Schleswig-Holstein, Germany
- Party: CDU
- Occupation: Engineer

Herbert Möller (7 April 1923 – 3 June 2026) was a German politician. A member of the Christian Democratic Union, he served in the Landtag of Schleswig-Holstein from 1985 to 1987.

Möller died in Neumünster on 3 June 2026, at the age of 103.
