= Rüdiger Erben =

German politician (1967–2026)

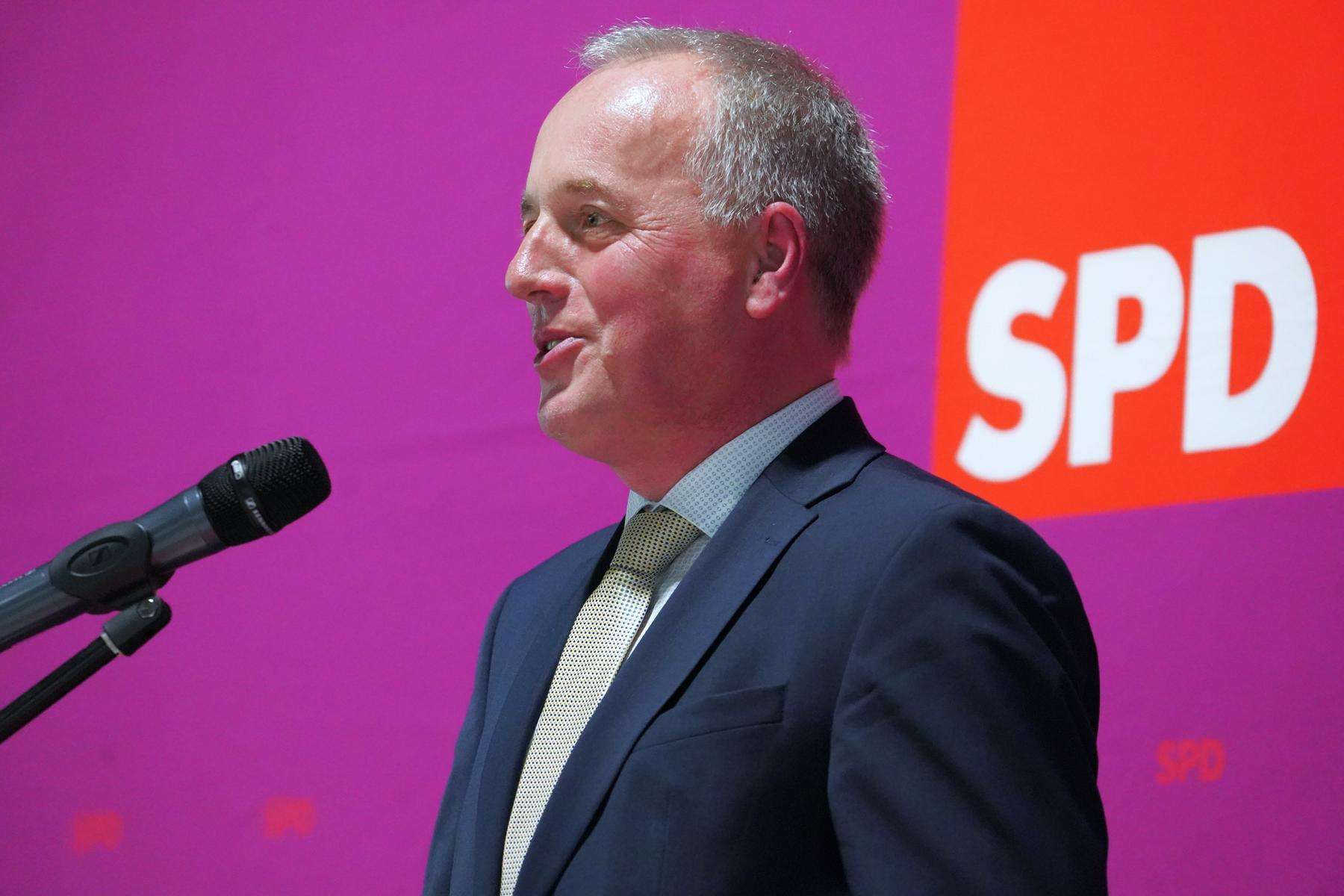
- Erben in 2024

Member of the Landtag of Saxony-Anhalt
- In office 9 April 2011 – 21 January 2026
- In office 24 April 2006 – 4 May 2006
- Constituency: Hohenmölsen-Weißenfels

Personal details
- Born: 26 October 1967 Bad Salzungen, East Germany
- Died: 21 January 2026 (aged 58) Magdeburg, Saxony-Anhalt, Germany
- Party: SPD
- Education: Verwaltungs- und Wirtschaftsakademie
- Occupation: Civil servant

Rüdiger Erben (26 October 1967 – 21 January 2026) was a German politician. A member of the Social Democratic Party, he served in the Landtag of Saxony-Anhalt from April to May 2006 and again from 2011 to 2026.

Erben died in Magdeburg on 21 January 2026, at the age of 58.
