= Albrecht Weinberg =

German Holocaust survivor (1925–2026)

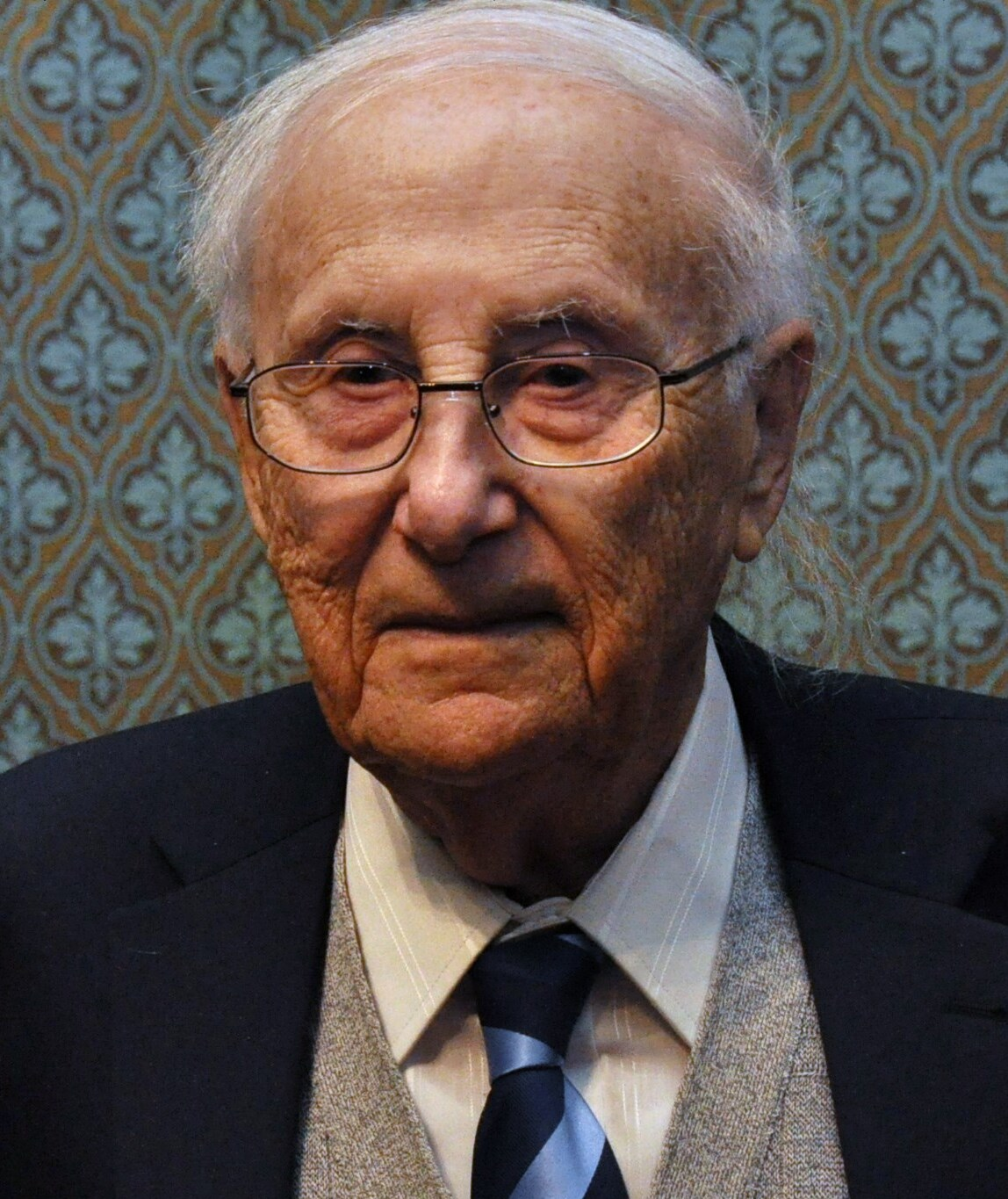
- Weinberg in 2017
- Born: 7 March 1925; Rhauderfehn, Province of Hanover, Prussia, Germany
- Died: 12 May 2026 (aged 101); Leer, Lower Saxony, Germany
- Occupation: Butcher's shop owner
- Known for: Holocaust survivor
- Honours: Federal Cross of Merit (returned in 2025)

Albrecht Weinberg (7 March 1925 – 12 May 2026) was a German Holocaust survivor. He was imprisoned at the Buna/Monowitz concentration camp at first and survived three death marches. In 1945, he was sent to the Mittelbau-Dora concentration camp before being liberated in Bergen-Belsen when the British Armed Forces arrived there.

Following the Holocaust, Weinberg emigrated with his sister to the United States, where he ran a butcher's shop. He was awarded the Federal Cross of Merit in 2017, but returned it in 2025 in protest of the CDU/CSU's migration policy.

== Early life and Holocaust imprisonment ==
Weinberg was born in Rhauderfehn, Province of Hanover, on 7 March 1925, into a Jewish family. His father, Alfred Weinberg, a cattle dealer, and his mother Flora Grünberg were taken from Berlin to the Theresienstadt concentration camp in 1942 and from there to the Auschwitz concentration camp in October 1944, where they were killed.

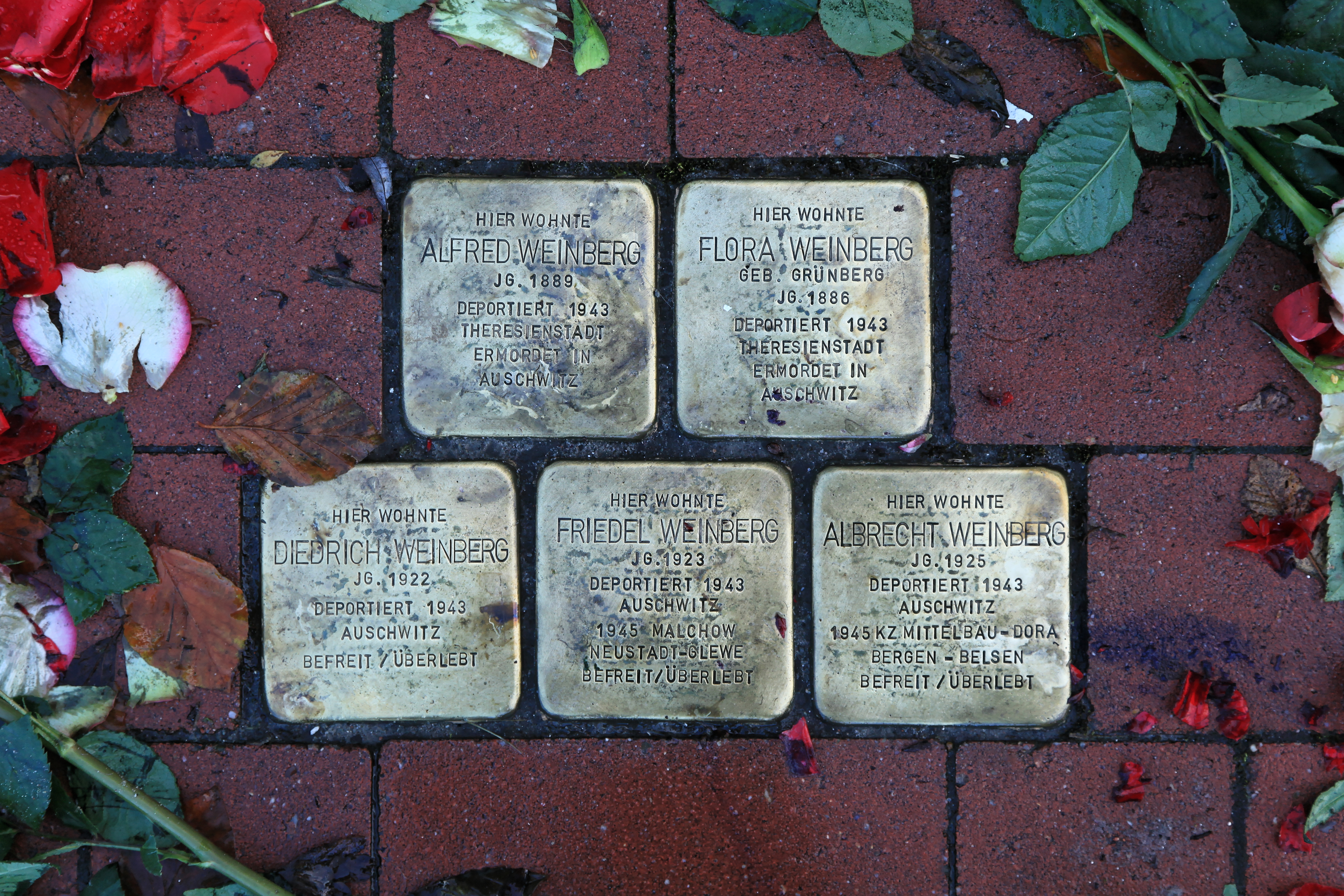
Stumbling block memorials to Albrecht and his family in Rhauderfehn

The family was forced to move to Leer in 1936. Following the November pogroms in 1938, Weinberg and his sister Friedel were sent to the Silesian estate of Groß Breesen. There, the Hachshara movement taught Jewish young people basic agricultural skills for later aliyah to Palestine. But when the emigration was to take place, Jews were already forbidden to leave Germany. The siblings later had to work in a camp near Fürstenwalde near Berlin, and they were deported to the Auschwitz concentration camp in April 1943 on a transport to the East.

Weinberg had to work in the Buna/Monowitz concentration camp for two years. He survived three death marches. In February 1945, he was sent to the Mittelbau-Dora concentration camp. In April 1945, he was liberated in Bergen-Belsen when the British Forces arrived there.

== Life after the Holocaust ==
Together with his sister Friedel, Weinberg emigrated to the United States in 1947. Both never married and lived in New York for more than 60 years. He ran a butcher's shop with another Holocaust survivor. He had also taught high school students about the Holocaust by retelling his personal experiences. He continued to do so until his death.

In 1985, they returned to Germany at the invitation of their hometown of Leer. Numerous Jewish survivors attended for a week of remembrance. The siblings also took part in other meetings. After sister Friedel suffered a stroke in Florida in 2011, the siblings returned to Leer in 2012. Friedel Weinberg died in May 2012. Weinberg increasingly attended schools in the following years and reported on his fate. The Inge Katz School was named after his cousin Inge Katz, which Weinberg also attended.

In 2011, stumbling stones were laid in Rhauderfehn at the lower end in front of the family's former residential and commercial building. In Rhauderfehn, there has been a street named Geschwister-Weinberg-Straße since 2006. Since 2020, there has also been one in Leer. In 2022, Albrecht Weinberg gave the impetus for stumbling stones to be laid in Leer for relatives. They were installed on 22 October 2022.

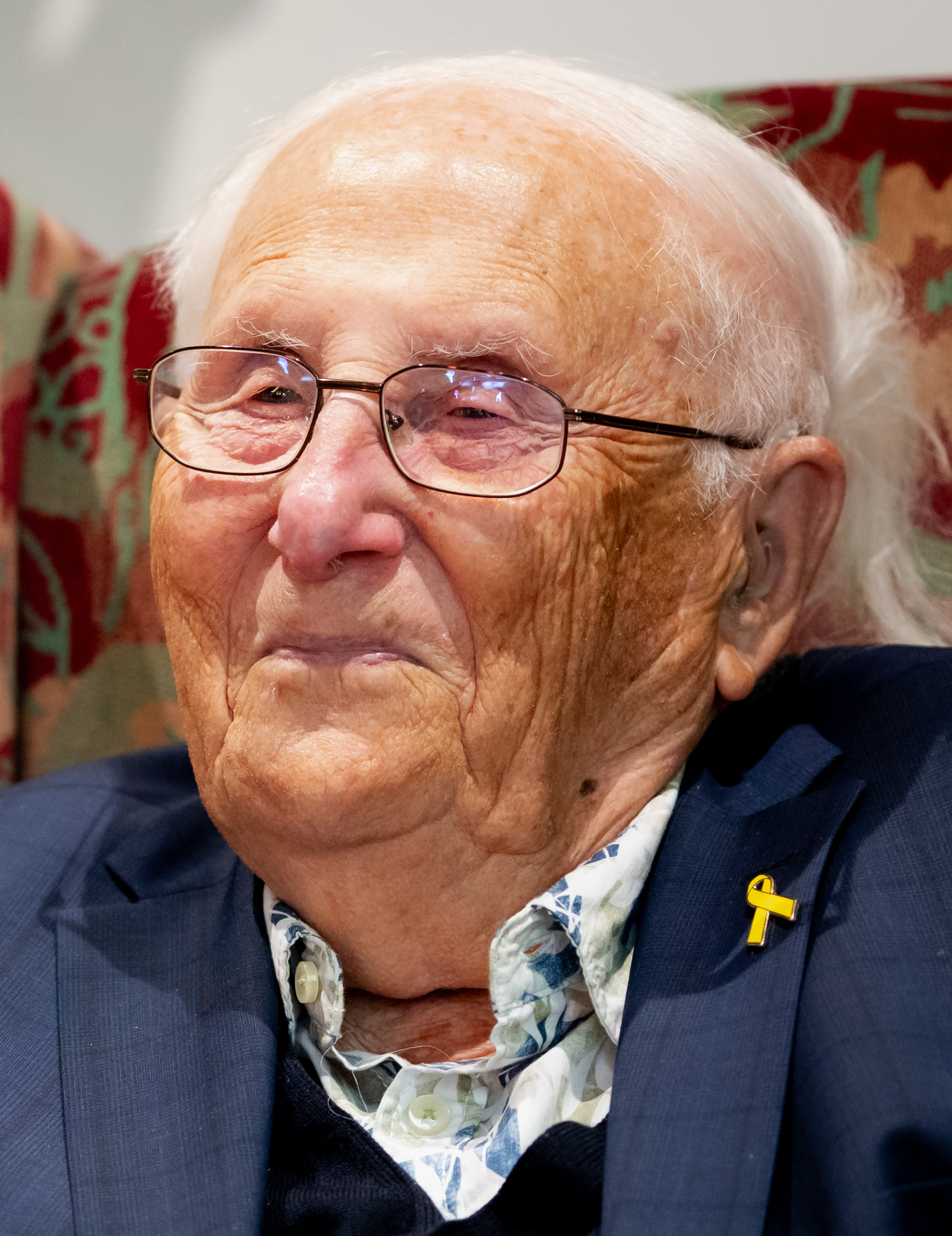
Weinberg in 2025

On 30 January 2025, Weinberg announced that he would return the Federal Cross of Merit awarded to him in 2017 to protest against the fact that a CDU/CSU motion for a resolution on migration policy had received a majority in the Bundestag the day before due to the votes of the AfD. Luigi Toscano, a photographer who had been awarded the Federal Medal of Merit and was a friend of Weinberg's, joined him. In a personal conversation, Federal President Frank-Walter Steinmeier expressed understanding for Weinberg's decision, but asked him to reconsider it. Weinberg, however, stood by his decision to return the Federal Cross of Merit. On 11 February 2025, he made good on his announcement. A month later in March 2025, Weinberg celebrated his 100th birthday.

In his later years, he described the psychological toll his experience in the concentration camps had on him and how he would experience night terrors.

== Death ==
Weinberg died on 12 May 2026 in Leer, Germany, at the age of 101. Weeks before his death, he had attended the premiere of his biopic Es ist immer in meinem Kopf.

== Awards ==
- 2017: Federal Cross of Merit on the ribbon for tireless reconciliation efforts (returned in 2025).
- 2023: Appointment as honorary citizen of Leer.
- 2024: Appointment as Honorary Citizen of Nordhausen.
- 2026: The Jewish community of Oldenburg awarded the Albrecht-Weinberg-Prize for special social commitment and services to the community from 2026.
