= Ekkehart Schlicht =

German economist

- Born: January 1, 1945 (age 81); Kiel, Germany

Academic background
- Education: University of Kiel; University of Regensburg

Academic work
- Discipline: Economics
- Institutions: LMU Munich
- Notable ideas: Efficiency wages Custom in the economy
- Website: Information at IDEAS / RePEc

Ekkehart Schlicht (born in 1945) is a German economist. He is best known for his work in labor economics, custom in the economy, and his contributions to the field of institutional economics.

== Early life ==
Ekkehart Schlicht was born in 1945 in the Northern German city of Kiel. He attended the Freie Waldorfschule Rendsburg (Schleswig-Holstein) where he completed his Abitur in 1965.

== Studies ==
Schlicht attended the University of Kiel from 1965 to 1967, and University of Regensburg from 1967 to 1969, where he received the title of Diplom-Volkswirt in 1969. The topic of Schlicht's Diplomarbeit was "Die Einbeziehung des technischen Fortschritts in die Produktionstheorie" (The inclusion of technical progress in production theory). Two years later, he completed his doctorate, writing his thesis on "Eine neoklassische Theorie der Vermögensverteilung" (A neo-classical theory of wealth distribution).

== Academic career ==
Schlicht has taught at Bielefeld University (1976–80), Technical University of Darmstadt (1980–93), and LMU Munich (since 1993). He has also held guest professorships at the University of Bonn (1975–76), Brown University (1987/88), the University of Minnesota (1991), the University of Melbourne (1995), and the University of California at Berkeley (2000/2001), as well as many further research positions.

== Major contributions ==
Schlicht's major contributions have been numerous works on labor economics, institutional economics, and economic methods.

Among his work in labor economics are papers on the theory of wealth distribution, efficiency wages and wage discrimination, in which Schlicht offers rationales for why such commonly observed phenomena may emerge in a free market. On efficiency wages, Schlicht has argued that the offering by employers of above-market wages may have to do with turnover costs, which the employer attempts to reduce by paying a "job rent". This is an alternative to other common approaches to efficiency wages such as the "discipline" theory by, e.g., Shapiro and Stiglitz, or the "adverse selection" and "loyalty" models by, e.g., Akerlof. More recently he has developed an efficiency wage theory based on "selection wages" where firms offer higher wages in order to attract more applicants which enables them to implement more demanding hiring standards.

In the field of institutional economics, Schlicht has written a book on custom in the economy and numerous publications on topics which combine economic, psychological, and institutional analysis. Several articles have also focused on social evolution, comparing the evolution of biological organisms to the evolution of social norms and institutions.

Some other publications by Schlicht have focused on seasonal adjustment of time series data and a "moving equilibrium theorem".
