= Laura Wattenberg =

American name expert, entrepreneur, and author

Laura Wattenberg is a name expert, entrepreneur, and author of The Baby Name Wizard. She is known for deriving cultural insights from scientific analysis of name usage, as well as creating innovative interactive tools to communicate these insights. Wattenberg also co-founded the name generating website Nymbler with Icosystem. Wattenberg is frequently quoted in the media on name-related topics.

== Writing, technology, and entrepreneurship ==
Wattenberg began her career as a baby name expert in 2005, with the publication of The Baby Name Wizard. The book took a new approach to the topic of baby names, focusing on cultural usage over etymologies. Taking advantage of recently released historical data from the U.S. Social Security Administration, Wattenberg provided graphs and statistical analyses of historical name trends. Currently in its third edition, the book has sold over a quarter-million copies.

Along with the book, Wattenberg publishes regularly on how names shed light on cultural issues. In addition to contributing to a blog accompanying The Baby Name Wizard, she is a frequent contributor to the Huffington Post and Slate. She is often quoted in the media on name news, on topics ranging from celebrity names to cultural implications of name trends.

In 2008, Wattenberg co-founded a company, Generation Grownup, to provide news, analysis and tools for expectant parents and others interested in names. When it was acquired by CafeMom in 2014, the company's web properties had 1.5 million monthly unique users, had won awards, and became standard references for name information on the web.

The Generation Grownup sites also feature a suite of technological tools for understanding name trends. The Name Voyager was the first visualization of baby name trends. Namipedia is a crowd-sourced encyclopedia of name information that contains entries on more than 40,000 names. The Name Matchmaker provides a direct way for expectant parents to choose names.

== Cultural commentary ==
Wattenberg's research-driven, analytical approach to understanding names and style has led to new insights into the connection between naming trends and society as a whole. As New York Times columnist David Brooks put it, "I didn’t become aware of the true import of names until I read Laura Wattenberg. She has taken her obsession with names ... and has transformed it into a window on American society."

For example, Wattenberg has found strong (and counterintuitive) relationships between partisan voting and baby name trends across states in the United States. Wattenberg supplements data analysis with historical research, tracing, for instance, how U.S. attitudes towards names have been intertwined with attitudes towards race for more than a century, and how gun-related names mirror attitudes toward firearms.

A key theme in her work is how the common modern desire for a distinct name has led to "lockstep individualism" in which parents make the same choices even as they attempt to find unique names.

== Earlier work ==
Wattenberg has an M.S. in psychology from Stanford University, and began her career as a researcher for the Business Enterprise Trust, where she wrote several Harvard Business School case studies on socially conscious business practices. From 1996 to 2002 she led design and development of high-growth technology products for Johnson & Higgins and Marsh & Mclennan.
