= 2026 in Spain =

- Decades: 2000s; 2010s; 2020s; 2030s
- See also: History of Spain; Timeline of Spanish history; List of years in Spain

Events in the year 2026 in Spain.

== Incumbents ==
- Monarch – Felipe VI
- Prime Minister – Pedro Sánchez (Sánchez III Government)
- President of the Congress of Deputies – Francina Armengol
- President of the Senate – Pedro Rollán
- President of the Constitutional Court – Cándido Conde-Pumpido
- President of the Supreme Court and the General Council of the Judiciary – Isabel Perelló
- President of the Council of State – Carmen Calvo
- President of the Court of Auditors – Enriqueta Chicano Jávega
- Attorney General – Álvaro García Ortiz
- Ombudsman – Ángel Gabilondo
- Chief of the Defence Staff – Teodoro Esteban López Calderón

== Events ==
=== January ===
- 14 January – A Turkish Airlines aircraft flying from Istanbul makes an emergency landing at Barcelona-El Prat Airport following a bomb threat involving a passenger creating an in-flight wireless network with a suspicious title.
- 18 January – Two high-speed trains derail and collide near Adamuz, killing 43 people.
- 20 January – A Rodalies de Catalunya train collides with a retaining wall that had fallen on the track in Gelida, killing the driver and injuring 37 passengers.
- 22 January – A commuter train collides with a crane near Cartagena, injuring four people.
- 27 January – The government announces amendments to immigration laws granting unauthorized migrants (potentially 500,000 migrants) legal residency of up to one year along with work permits.

=== February ===
- 4 February – One person is reported missing in Málaga Province after falling into the Turvilla river during heavy rains caused by Storm Leonardo.
- 8 February – 2026 Aragonese regional election
- 9 February – The Sindicato Español de Maquinistas y Ayudantes Ferroviarios starts a strike following the train derailments in Adamuz, Córdoba, and Gelida, Catalonia.
- 16 February –
  - The government unveils the "Spain Grows" fund, a public investment fund aimed at raising 120 billion euros ($142 billion) to help ease an ongoing housing crisis.
  - Five people are killed in a fire at an apartment in Manlleu.

=== March ===
- 2 March – U.S. military aircraft begin to leave Spain after the Spanish government denied the U.S. permission to use their airbases for military operations against Iran.
- 5 March – The Government of Spain announces that the frigate Cristóbal Colón will join French aircraft carrier Charles de Gaulle and Greek Navy ships to the protection and aerial defence of Cyprus.
- 11 March – Spain permanently withdraws its ambassador to Israel and terminates the position after a worsening of bilateral diplomatic relations.
- 15 March – 2026 Castilian-Leonese regional election
- 16 March – King Felipe VI issues an acknowledgement of abuses made by Spanish conquistadors during the colonization of the Americas in remarks made at the National Archaeological Museum in Madrid.
- 26 March – Noelia Castillo euthanasia case: A 25-year-old woman from Barcelona undergoes euthanasia after her request was approved by authorities and upheld through multiple legal challenges despite opposition from her family.
- 30 March – The Spanish government closes the country's airspace to U.S. planes involved in attacks on Iran.
- 31 March – Spanish police dismantle a hashish-smuggling operation involving an underground tunnel linking Morocco to Ceuta; authorities seize 17 metric tons of hashish, €1.4 million in cash, and arrest 27 people.

=== April ===
- 10 April – A tourist bus falls off a ravine in La Gomera, killing one person and injuring 27 others.

=== May ===
- 14 May – Two people are arrested in El Ejido, Andalusia in connection with the seizure in Germany of eight metric tons of cocaine valued at 500 million euros ($582 million) from a container that originated from West Africa in February.
- 17 May – 2026 Andalusian regional election
- 18 May – Two people are killed while four others are injured in a mass shooting in El Ejido, Andalusia.

=== June ===
- 2 June – The municipal government of La Línea de la Concepción cancels a scheduled warmup football match on 9 June between Chile and DR Congo ahead of the 2026 FIFA World Cup, citing possible health risks amid the 2026 Central Africa Ebola epidemic.
- 6 June – Pope Leo XIV arrives in Spain as part of a seven-day visit.
- 10 June – The central tower of the Sagrada Familia in Barcelona is officially blessed by Pope Leo XIV.
- 11 June–19 July – Spain participates at the 2026 FIFA World Cup.
- 11 June – Two people are killed while four others are injured in a fire at a residential building in Magaluf.

=== July ===
- 10 July – Twelve people are killed in a wildfire in Almeria Province.
- 15 July – The border fence separating Spain and Gibraltar is removed as part of a treaty with the United Kingdom placing Gibraltar under the Schengen Area.
- 19 July – Spain wins the 2026 FIFA World Cup after defeating Argentina 1–0 at the final.
- 20 July – One person is killed by a collapsed fountain in Ciudad Rodrigo during celebrations over the 2026 FIFA World Cup final.
- 26 July–1 August – 2026 Men's and Women's EuroHockey U21 Championship in Valencia.
- 30 July –
  - Thousands of migrants enter the enclave city of Ceuta from its border with Morocco. At least 34 people die in the process.
  - Italy suspends Schengen Area agreements with Spain, citing the 2026 Morocco–Spain border incident.

=== August ===
- 9 August – Spain suspends Schengen Area agreements with Italy for one month in response to similar measures imposed by the latter country over the 2026 Morocco–Spain border incident.
- 12 August – A total solar eclipse occurs at the Moon's descending node of the orbit in North America and Europe. The total eclipse passes over the Arctic, Greenland, Iceland, the Atlantic Ocean, northeastern Portugal and northern Spain.
- 18 August – A magnitude 4.9 earthquake hits Granada, injuring three people.
- 19 August – The government reverses its policy for unaccompanied Moroccan migrant children in Ceuta, allowing about 500 children to relocate to peninsular Spain.

=== September ===
- 2 September –
  - On Ceuta Day, tens of thousands of people across Spain joined mass protests against Sánchez in support of the city of Ceuta.
  - A boat carrying migrants is discovered adrift off Gran Canaria. At least five deaths are recorded.
- 8 September – Spain sanctions products from Israeli settlements in the West Bank. (Note: However, Spain clarified that settlement trade restrictions are contingent on EU action.)
- 10 September – The Congress of Deputies approves legislation granting Spanish citizenship to Sahrawis born under the Spanish administration of Western Sahara.
- 23 September – Eighty-seven year old pensioner Maricarmen Abascal is forcibly evicted from her rented apartment of 70 years in Madrid after being unable to pay increased payments, triggering the 2026 Spanish housing protests.
- 26 September – A right-wing demonstration in Madrid over the 2026 Ceuta migrant crisis draws tens of thousands of people.

=== October ===
- 3 October – A bar collapses in San Vicente de la Sonsierra, La Rioja, injuring 11 people.
- 5 October – Prime Minister Sanchez calls a snap election for 29 November after the Congress of Deputies fails to pass proposed legislation on housing.
- 12 October – An AVE train travelling from Madrid to Barcelona catches fire at Ricla, forcing the evacuation of all 283 passengers on board.
- 25 October – A bus crashes near Barcelona, injuring 83 people.
- 28 October – Two trains collide between Mora and Orgaz, killing at least 69 people.

=== November ===
- 3 November –
  - Óscar Puente resigns as Minister of Transport and Sustainable Mobility amid criticism over the 2026 Toledo train collision. Deputy prime minister Carlos Cuerpo named as his successor.
  - A Ryanair flight traveling from Manchester is searched upon landing at Región de Murcia International Airport after being subjected to a bomb threat that is subsequently found to be false.
- 5 November – Two passenger aircraft are searched before departure from Madrid–Barajas Airport after being subjected to bomb threats that are subsequently found to be false.
- 8 November – Authorities of El Hierro in the Canary Islands declare a state of emergency following the arrival of 3,300 migrants in November alone.
- 10 November – A police officer is killed and another is injured in an explosion while responding to a shooting in Oviedo, Asturias.
- 11 November – Spain experiences its first general strike since 2012.

=== Scheduled ===
- 29 November – 2026 Spanish general election.

== Holidays ==
- 1 January – New Year's Day
- 6 January – Epiphany
- 2 April – Maundy Thursday
- 3 April – Good Friday
- 6 April – Easter Monday
- 1 May – International Workers' Day
- 15 August – Assumption Day
- 12 October – National Day of Spain
- 1 November – All Saints' Day
- 6 December – Constitution Day
- 25 December – Christmas Day

== Deaths ==
=== January ===
- 1 January: Xesús Cañedo, 67, politician and Asturian language activist, co-founder of Partíu Asturianista.
- 3 January: Maria Eugènia Cuenca, 78, politician, member of the Catalan parliament (1999–2006) and the Congress of Deputies (1986–1992).
- 4 January: Zoraida Burgos i Matheu, 92, writer, poet and librarian
- 13 January: Juan Antonio de Andrés, 83, president of the Government of Aragon (1982–1983).
- 15 January: Princess Irene of Greece and Denmark, 83, South African-born Greek-Spanish royal.
- 31 January: Ricardo Melchior Navarro, 78, politician, president of the Island Council of Tenerife (1999–2013).

=== February ===
- 2 February: Josefina Castellví, 90, oceanographer, head of the Juan Carlos I Antarctic Base (1989–1997) and namesake for Castellvi Peak.
- 7 February: Jesús Fuentes Lázaro, 79, president of the Regional Government of Castilla–La Mancha (1982–1983).
- 12 February: Xesús Alonso Montero, 97, writer, specialist in Galician literature, president of the Royal Galician Academy (2013–2017).
- 25 February: Antonio Tejero, 93, lieutenant colonel (Operation Galaxia), main leader of the 1981 Spanish coup attempt.

=== March ===
- 6 March: Francisco Fernández Carvajal, 88, Roman Catholic priest and writer.
- 7 March: Vicente Paniagua, 78, basketball player (Real Madrid, national team).
- 10 March: Raúl del Pozo, 89, journalist.
- 13 March: Wolfredo Wildpret de la Torre, 92, botanist.
- 14 March: Gemma Cuervo, 94, actress (Vente a Alemania, Pepe, Two Men and Two Women Amongst Them, Aquí no hay quien viva).
- 25 March: Isaías Zarazaga, 98, veterinarian, academic and politician, deputy (1982–1989) and senator (1977–1979).
- 30 March: Carlos Westendorp, 89, minister of foreign affairs (1995–1996), high representative for Bosnia and Herzegovina (1997–1999), and MEP (1999–2003).

=== April ===
- 2 April: Javier López Marcano, 71, member of the Parliament of Cantabria (2011–2015, since 2023) and three-time regional minister, mayor of Torrelavega (1999–2003).
- 3 April: Ricardo Ortiz, 51, bullfighter.
- 26 April: Francisco Letamendia, 82, Basque politician and lawyer (Burgos trials), member of the Congress of Deputies (1977–1978, 1979–1982).

=== May ===
- 4 May: Carlos Garaikoetxea, 87, Basque politician, lehendakari (1979–1985).
- 10 May: José Ballesta, 67, medical doctor and academic, mayor of Murcia (2015–2021, since 2023).

=== June ===
- 2 June:
  - José Carlos Gómez Villamandos, 63, veterinarian, minister of universities of Andalusia (since 2022) and rector of the University of Córdoba (2014–2022).
  - Josep Maria Cadena, 90, art critic and journalist.
- 3 June: Fermín Sola Barrena, 52, police officer.
- 11 June: María Ángeles Mezquíriz Irujo, 97, archaeologist and museologist, director of the Museum of Navarre, Pamplona (1957–1998).
- 14 June: Josep Maria Sans i Travé, 78, archivist and historian.
- 24 June: Isabel Jara, 69, Spanish-Venezuelan civil servant, delegate of the Government of the Canary Islands in Venezuela (since 2023)
- 25 June: Salomó Marquès, 84, academic and writer.
- 30 June: Augusto Borderas, 94, politician, member of the Basque Parliament (1987–1989) and the Senate of Spain (1989–1996).

=== July ===
- 12 July: Gilda Love, 100, drag queen.
- 13 July: Luis Goytisolo, 91, novelist, member of the Royal Spanish Academy.
- 21 July: Josep Vallverdú, 103, Catalan writer and linguist.

=== August ===
- 16 August: Marcos Rodríguez Pantoja, 80, feral child, subject of Among Wolves.

=== September ===
- 25 September: Javier Delgado Barrio, 93, president of the Supreme Court and the General Council of the Judiciary (1996–2001).

=== October ===
- 13 October: María Asunción Milá, 107, human rights activist.
- 23 October: María José Verdú, 58, member of the Parliament of the Balearic Islands (since 2023).
- 27 October: Cristina Calero, 35, member of the Parliament of the Canary Islands (since 2023).
- 28 October:
  - Fátima Báñez, 59, economist, minister of employment and social security (2011–2018) and deputy (2000–2019).
  - Marisa Manchado, 70, composer, pianist and academic.
  - Marta Shahbazi, 40–41, biologist.

=== November ===
- 3 November: Jesús de Miguel, 30, footballer (Castellón, Unionistas, Tenerife).
- 15 November: Antoni Poveda, 71, journalist, mayor of Sant Joan Despí (2006–2021) and senator (since 2021).

== See also ==
- 2026 in Europe
- 2026 in the European Union
- 2026 in Spanish television
