= Ricardo Ortiz =

Ricardo Ortiz may refer to:

- Ricardo Ortiz (bullfighter) (1974–2026), Spanish bullfighter.
- Ricardo Ortiz (academic) (1961–2025) was a, Cuban-born American scholar of US Latinx, queer, and literary studies
- Ricardo Ortiz (footballer) (born 1957), Uruguayan footballer and manager
