= José Bada Panillo =

Spanish politician (1929–2026)

Minister of Culture and Education of Aragon
- In office 6 June 1983 – 3 August 1987
- President: Santiago Marraco
- Preceded by: position established
- Succeeded by: Darío Vidal Llisterri

Personal details
- Born: José Ramón Bada Panillo; 4 May 1929 Fabara, Spain
- Died: 9 July 2026 (aged 97)
- Party: PSOE
- Education: Pontifical University of Salamanca; University of Innsbruck; LMU Munich
- Occupation: Academic

José Ramón Bada Panillo (4 May 1929 – 9 July 2026) was a Spanish politician. A member of the Spanish Socialist Workers' Party, he served as Minister of Culture and Education of Aragon from 1983 to 1987.

Bada died on 9 July 2026, at the age of 97.
