= Rivas de Tereso =

- Populated place
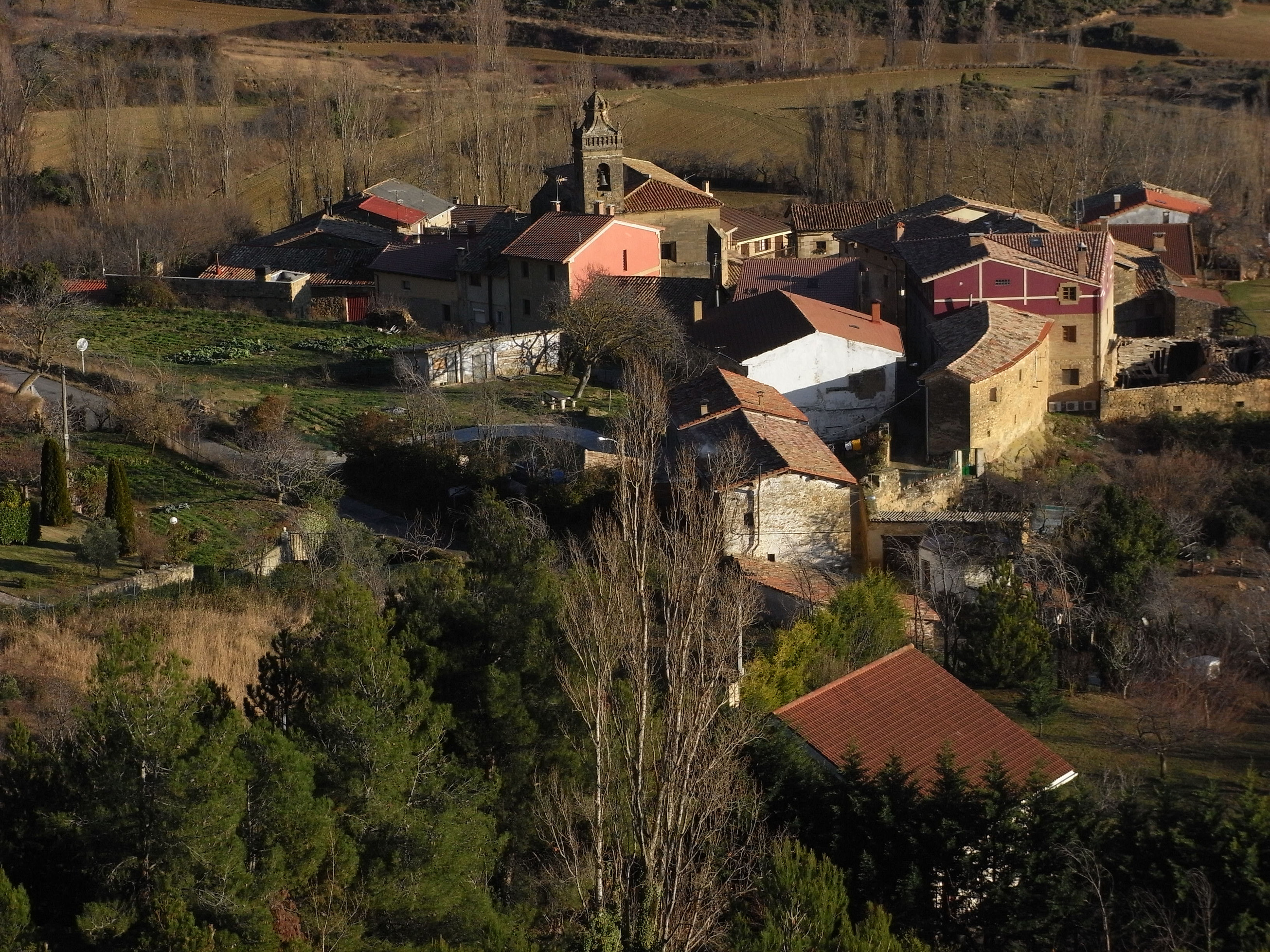

- Location within La Rioja, Spain Location within Spain
- Country: Spain
- Autonomous community: La Rioja
- Comarca: Haro

Population
  - Total: 21
- Postal code: 26339

Rivas de Tereso is a village in the municipality of San Vicente de la Sonsierra, in the province and autonomous community of La Rioja, Spain. As of 2018 had a population of 21 people.
