= Hermitage of Santa María de La Piscina =

- Ermita de Santa María de La Piscina (Spanish)
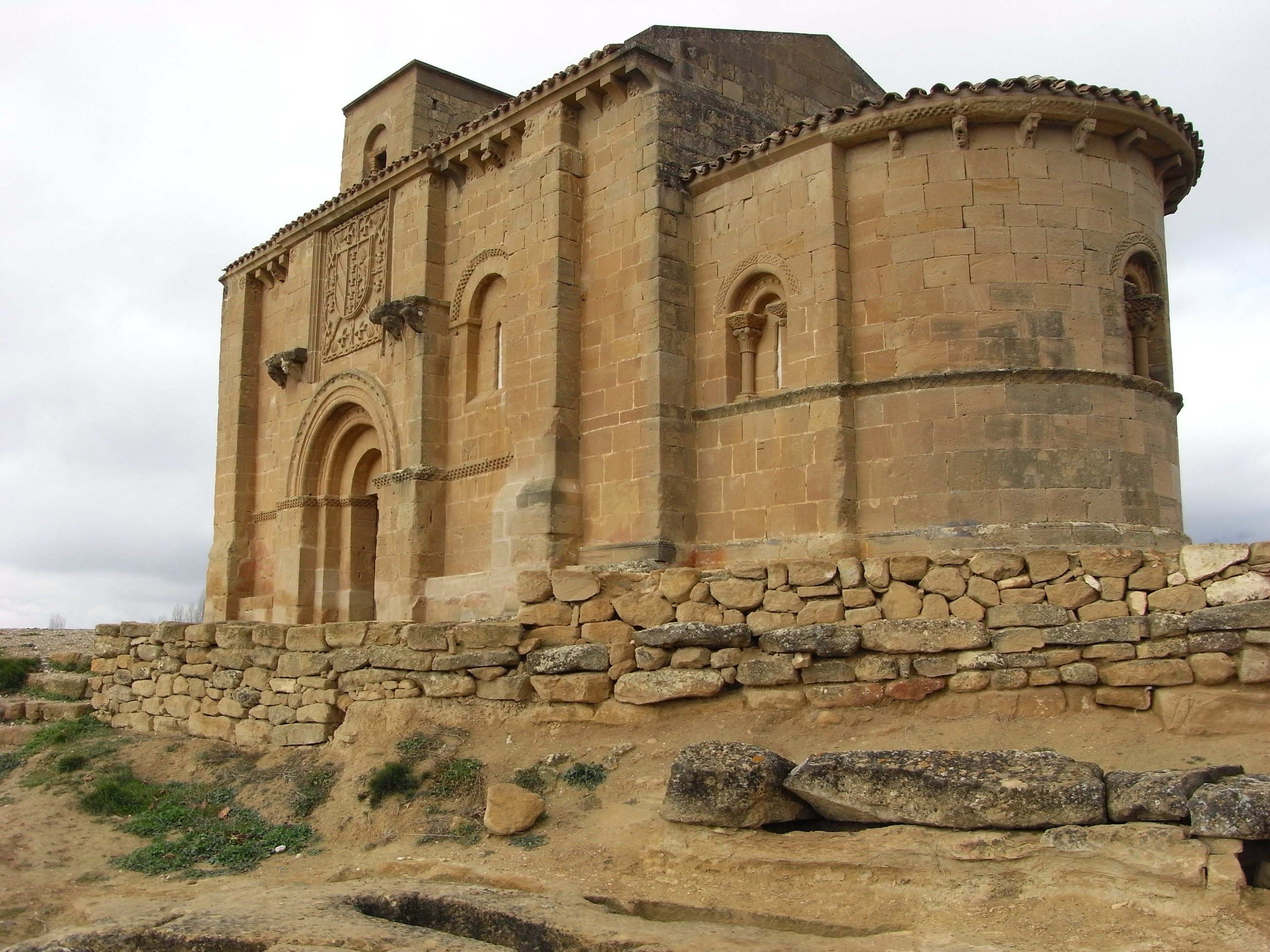

- Location within Spain
- 42.578053°N 2.725931°W
- Location: San Vicente de la Sonsierra, Spain

Site notes
- Architectural style: Romanesque

Spanish Cultural Heritage
- Official name: Ermita de Santa María de La Piscina
- Type: Non-movable
- Criteria: Monument
- Designated: 1931
- Reference no.: RI-51-0000707

The Hermitage of Santa María de La Piscina (Spanish: Ermita de Santa María de La Piscina) is a medieval church located in San Vicente de la Sonsierra, La Rioja, Spain. It was consecrated in 1137.

It was apparently founded by Ramiro Sánchez to house relics from the Holy Land, notably a supposed fragment of the True Cross. The dedication of the building refers to the Pool of Bethesda.

== Conservation ==
An important example of Romanesque architecture, it was declared a protected monument in 1931, the current designation being Bien de Interés Cultural.

== Necropolis ==
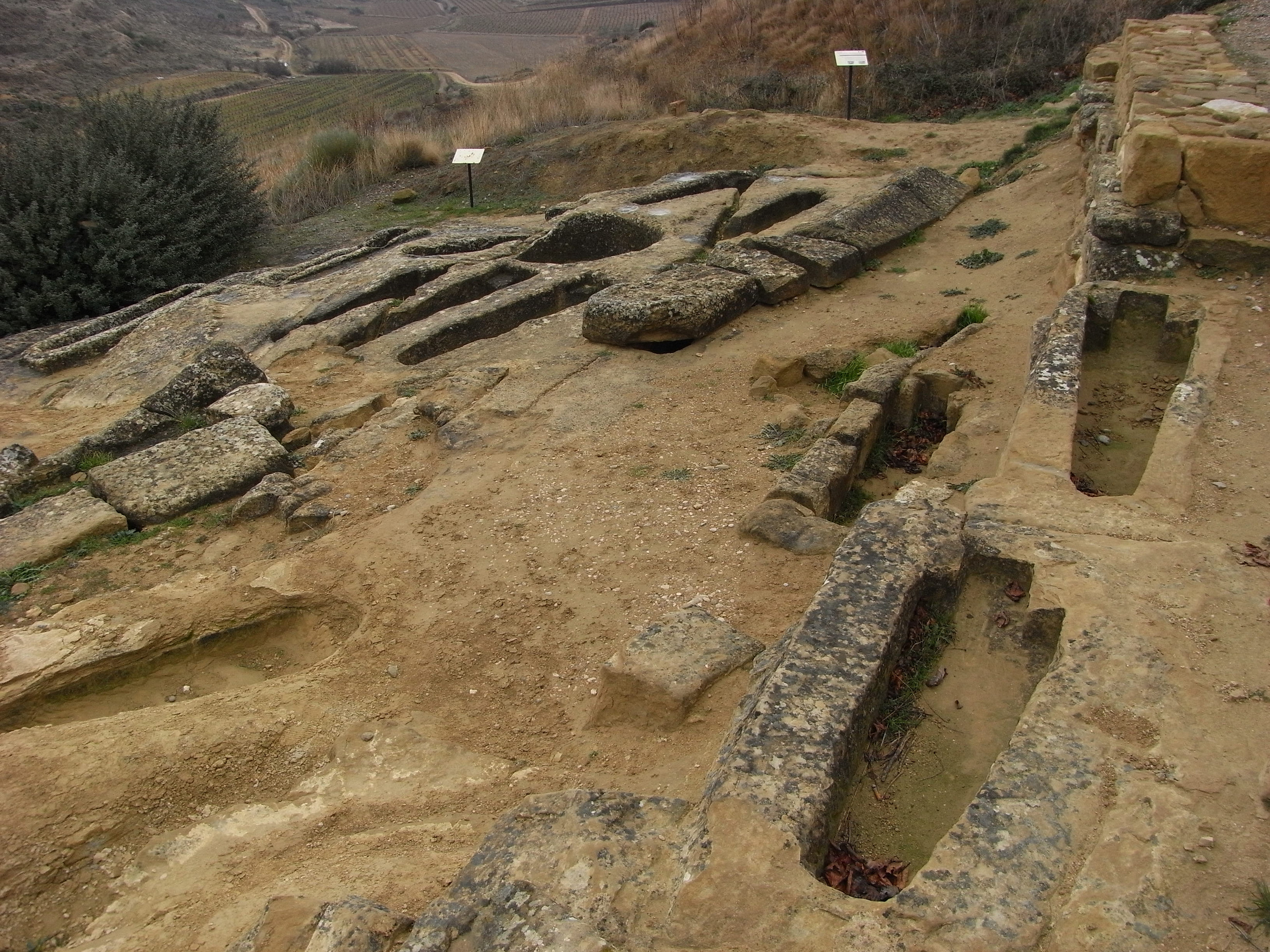

There are burial sites of interest in the vicinity of the church. They are from the period of the repoblación.

== See also ==
Hermitage
