= Josep Maria Sans i Travé =

Spanish historian (1947–2026)

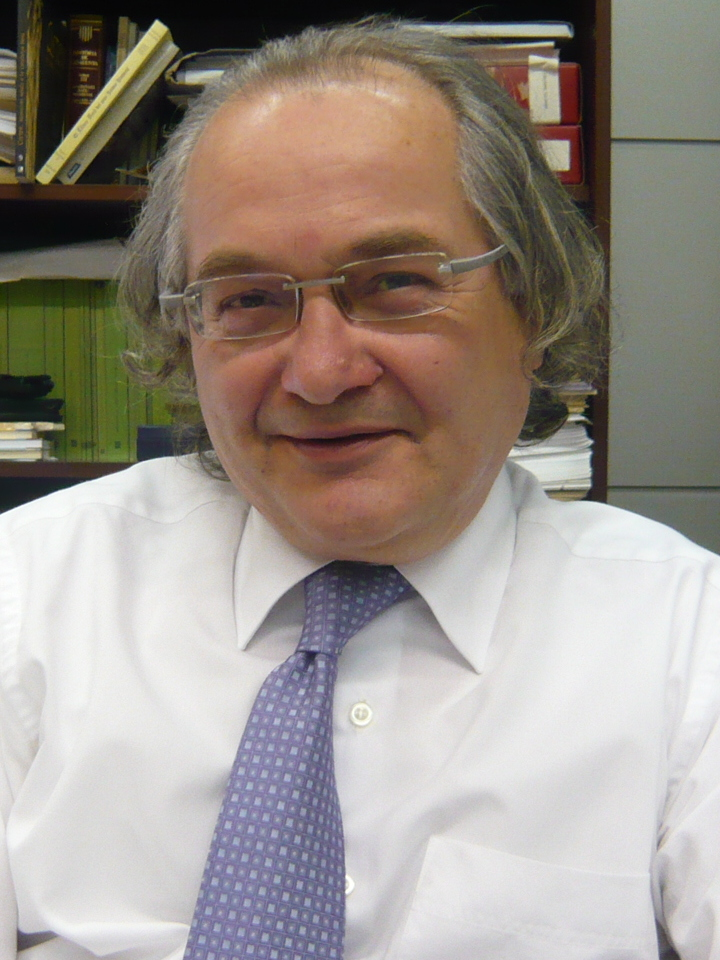
Josep Maria Sans i Travé

Josep Maria Sans i Travé (1947 – 14 June 2026) was a Spanish archivist and historian.

== Life and work ==
Josep Maria Sans i Travé was born in Solivella in 1947. He graduated in Medieval History from the University of Barcelona in 1971.

Sans i Travé directed his profession both towards teaching and research in history as well as towards archival science. He was a member of the Royal Academy of Belles Lettres of Barcelona since 2006. He published a number of books focusing on medieval history.

He was the Director General of Cultural Heritage between 28 May 2003 and 7 January 2004.

Sans i Travé died on 14 June 2026, at the age of 78.
