= Cristina Calero =

Spanish politician (1991–2026)

Member of the Parliament of the Canary Islands
- In office 31 July 2023 – 27 October 2026

Personal details
- Born: 1991
- Died: 27 October 2026 (aged 35)
- Party: CC
- Education: University of Granada; University of La Laguna

Cristina Calero García (1991 – 27 October 2026) was a Spanish politician. A member of the Canarian Coalition, she served in the Parliament of the Canary Islands from 2023 until her death in 2026.

Calero died on 27 October 2026, at the age of 35.
