= Gilda Love =

Spanish drag queen (1925–2026)

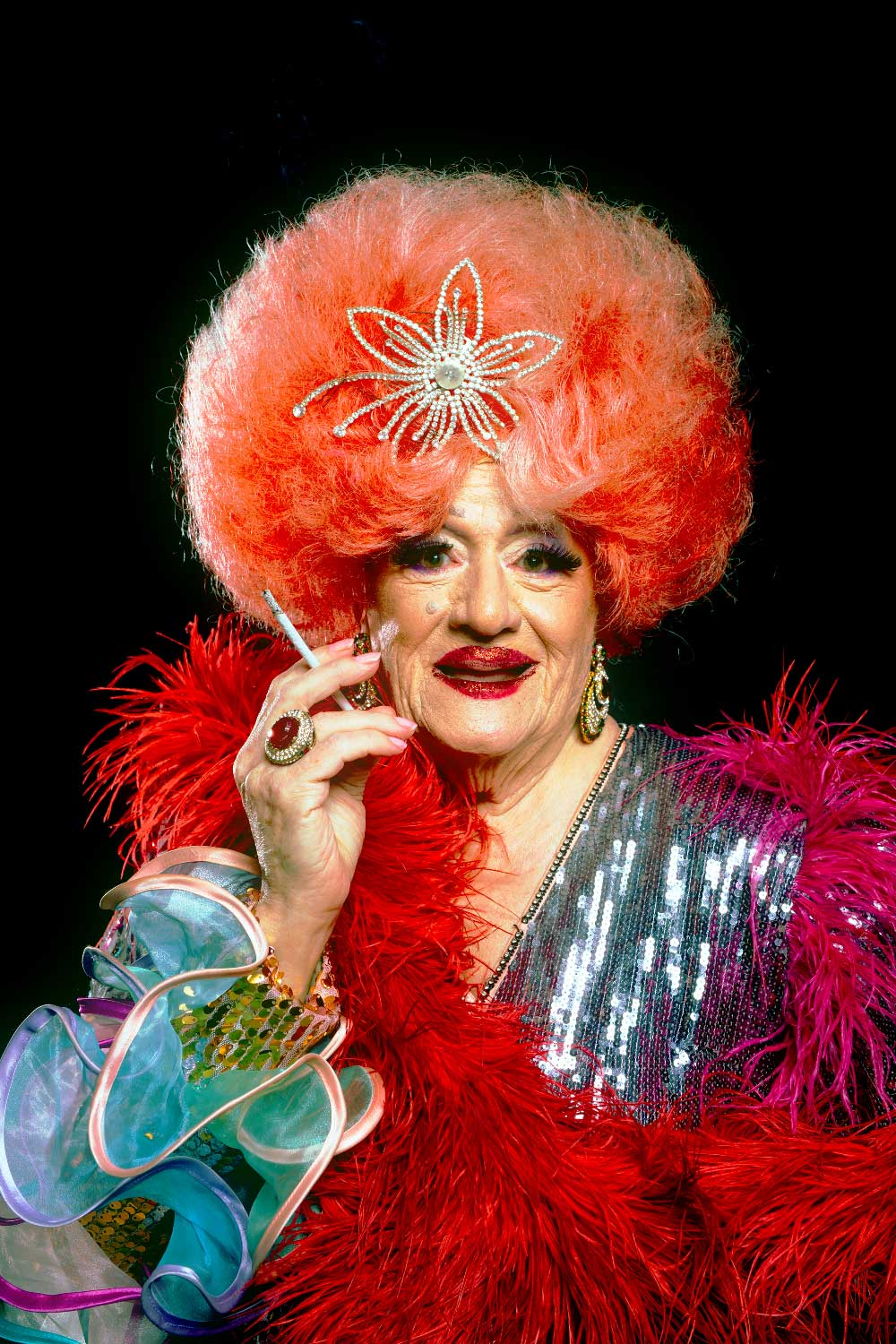
- Gilda Love in 2021
- Born: Eduardo Rondón Gallardo; 21 August 1925; Cádiz, Spain
- Died: 12 July 2026 (aged 100); Barcelona, Spain
- Occupations: Drag queen; actor

Eduardo Rondón Gallardo (21 August 1925 – 12 July 2026), better known as Gilda Love, was a Spanish drag queen and transformist who became the oldest drag queen in the country.

== Life and career ==
Eduardo Rondón Gallardo was born in Cádiz, Spain on 21 August 1925. His mother married at 14 and had 20 children of which 16 survived. Eduardo had a twin sister; she was born with the umbilical cord wrapped around her neck and did not survive childbirth.

He grew up with six brothers and nine sisters. His brothers subjected him to systematic mistreatment and violence from an early age. "They were always harassing me, because they knew what I was," Eduardo told El País. When he was two, his dressmaker sister put him in a Sevillian suit. "She and my mother said it was pretty and that I looked like a girl," Eduardo recalled, "My brothers, when they saw me dressed like that, put a match to my dress and tried to burn me like Joan of Arc. I still have the scars on my back. They were horrible to me, but by some miracle they never killed me," he said. He is the cousin of the first trans vedette, Sandra Salomé.

At the age of 17, he enlisted in the army as a paratrooper where he served for three years. After completing his mandatory military service, he left home, fleeing violence. After a brief period as a legionnaire, Eduardo abandoned Spain and moved to Marseille, France, and then to Paris. There he met several of the French trans pioneers, like Bambi and Capucine.

Rondón first performed as Gilda Love in the Madame Arthur, in Paris. He quickly began performing under his stage name in various cabarets in the 1960s and throughout his career he acted and shared a dressing room with the cuplé Carmen de Mairena.

In 2022 he starred in the documentary film Cantando en las azoteas, directed by Enric Ribes, and whose title comes from the verses written by Federico García Lorca in his poem Canción del mariquita. The documentary is based on a short film of the same name that Gilda Love produced in 2017.

Love died on 12 July 2026, at the age of 100.
