= Maria Eugènia Cuenca =

Spanish politician (1947–2026)

Maria Eugènia Cuenca i Valero (20 November 1947 – 3 January 2026) was a Spanish politician. She was the first female member of the Government of Catalonia when served as Minister of Governance between 1992 and 1993 under President Jordi Pujol.

== Life and career ==
Cuenca was born in Calatayud on 20 November 1947. She was a member of the Catalan parliament (1999–2006) and the Congress of Deputies (1986–1992), as a member of the Democratic Convergence of Catalonia.

Cuenca died on 3 January 2026, at the age of 78.
