= María José Verdú =

Spanish politician (1968–2026)

Member of the Parliament of the Balearic Islands
- In office 20 June 2023 – 23 October 2026

Personal details
- Born: 19 April 1968 Palma de Mallorca, Spain
- Died: 23 October 2026 (aged 58) Palma de Mallorca, Spain
- Party: Vox

María José Verdú (19 April 1968 – 23 October 2026) was a Spanish politician. A member of Vox, she served in the Parliament of the Balearic Islands from 2023 to 2026.

Verdú died in Palma de Mallorca on 23 October 2026 from a long illness, at the age of 58.
