= Augusto Borderas =

Spanish politician (1932–2026)

Augusto Borderas Gaztambide (20 June 1932 – 30 June 2026) was a Spanish politician.

== Life and career ==
Borderas was born in Irun on 20 June 1932. He served as a member of the Basque Parliament (1987–1989) and the Senate of Spain (1989–1996).

Borderas died on 30 June 2026, at the age of 94.
