= Juan Antonio de Andrés =

Spanish politician (1942–2026)

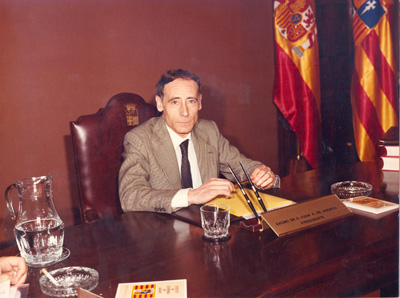
- de Andrés in 1983

President of the Government of Aragon
- In office 23 December 1982 – 3 June 1983
- Monarch: Juan Carlos I
- Preceded by: José María Hernández de la Torre (acting)
- Succeeded by: Santiago Marraco

Personal details
- Born: Juan Antonio de Andrés Rodríguez; 1942 Teruel, Spain
- Died: 13 January 2026 (aged 83) Zaragoza, Spain
- Party: UCD

Juan Antonio de Andrés Rodríguez (1942 – 13 January 2026) was a Spanish politician who belonged to the Union of the Democratic Centre (UCD) and who previously served as President of the Government of Aragon, one of the Spanish regional administrations, from 1982 to 1983. Andres died on 13 January 2026, at the age of 83.
