= Francisco Fernández Carvajal =

Spanish priest (1938 - 2026)

Francisco Fernández Carvajal or Francis Fernandez (24 January 1938 – 6 March 2026) was a Spanish Catholic priest in the Opus Dei Prelature and the author of several books.

== Biography ==
Fernández Carvajal was born in Albolote, province of Granada, on 24 January 1938. He is best known for his seven volume work Hablar con Dios (In Conversation with God), which has sold over two million copies in several languages, including Spanish, English, French, Italian, Portuguese, German, Croatian, Dutch, Romanian, Slovakian and Polish. It consists of over 450 meditations, one or more for every day of the year, as well as three meditations for each Sunday, corresponding to the three-year cycle in the Catholic lectionary. An updated, four-volume edition with over 550 meditations was completed in 2004.

He was a graduate in history from the University of Navarra, and held a doctorate in Canon law from the Angelicum in Rome. In 1961 Fernández earned a Doctorate in Canon Law from the Pontifical University of Saint Thomas Aquinas, Angelicum with a dissertation entitled Evolución histórico-jurídica de la autonomía interna en las congregaciones religiosas.

Fernández Carvajal was ordained a priest in 1964, and had ministered especially to university students throughout his career. Fernández was an editor of the magazine Revista Palabra for over 10 years, from the early 1980s to the mid-1990s.

Fernández Carvajal died in Madrid on 6 March 2026, at the age of 88.

== Books ==
- Hablar con Dios (Ediciones Palabra, 1988) Obra en 7 tomos; ISBN 84-7118-567-9
  - New edition: (Ediciones Palabra, 2004) Obra en 4 tomos; ISBN 84-8239-794-X
  - English edition: In Conversation with God (Scepter Publications, 1993) 7 volume set; ISBN 0-906138-19-1
  - Portuguese edition: Falar com Deus (Quadrante) 7 volume set; ISBN 85-7465-015-3
- Antología de textos (Ediciones Palabra, 2005) ISBN 84-8239-791-5
- El día que cambié mi vida (Ediciones Palabra, 2005) ISBN 84-8239-768-0
- Como quieras Tú. Cuarenta meditaciones sobre la Pasión del Señor (Ediciones Palabra, 2005) ISBN 84-8239-308-1
- Quédate conmigo. Vivir de la Eucaristía (Ediciones Palabra, 2005) ISBN 84-8239-880-6
- La dirección espiritual (Ediciones Palabra, 2003) ISBN 84-8239-427-4
- Hijos de Dios (Ediciones Palabra, 2003) ISBN 84-8239-804-0
  - English edition: Children of God: The Life of Spiritual Childhood Preached by Blessed Josemaria Escriva (Scepter Publications, 1998) ISBN 1-889334-05-7
- Donde duerme la ilusión: La tibieza (Ediciones Palabra, 2013) ISBN 978-8498409581
  - English edition: Overcoming Lukewarmness: Healing Your Soul’s Sadness (Midwest Theological Forum, 2011) ISBN 978-1-59417-143-7
- Lukewarmness: The Devil in Disguise (Scepter Publications, 2002) ISBN 971-11-7051-5
- Vida de Jesús (Ediciones Palabra, 1997) ISBN 84-8239-000-7
  - English edition: Life of Jesus (Midwest Theological Forum, 2019) ISBN 978-1-939231-97-0
- Through Wind and Waves: On Being a Spiritual Guide (Scepter Publishers, 2012) ISBN 1594171661
