= San Vicente de la Sonsierra =

- Municipality
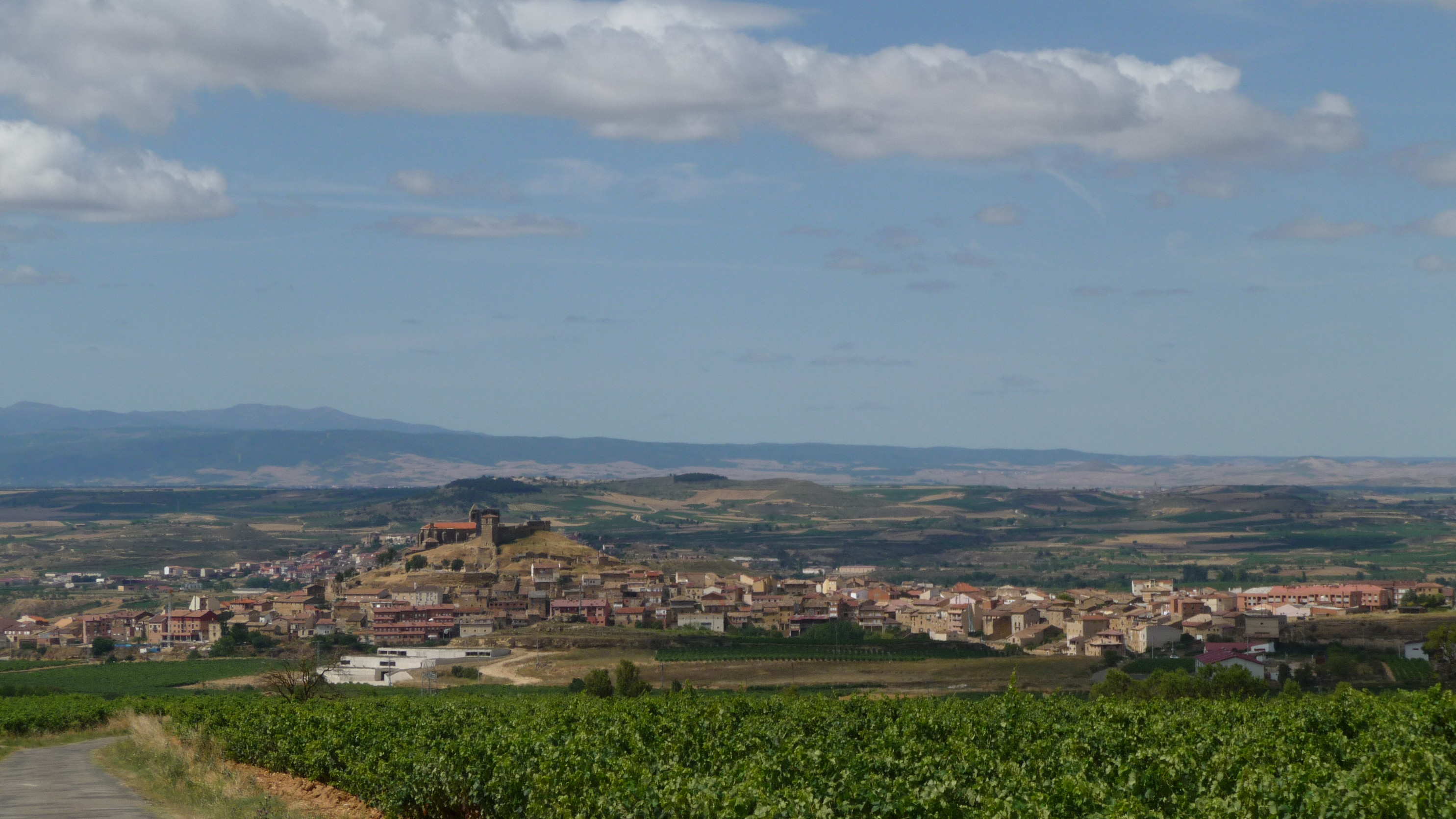
- Skyline of San Vicente de la Sonsierra

- Coat of arms

- Location within La Rioja, Spain Location within Spain
- Coordinates: 42°33′44″N 2°45′33″W
- Country: Spain
- Autonomous community: La Rioja
- Comarca: Haro

Government
  - Mayor: Javier Luis Fernández Mendoza (PP)

Area
  - Total: 48.56 km^{2} (18.75 sq mi)
- Elevation: 497 m (1,631 ft)

Population (2025-01-01)
  - Total: 1,054
- Postal code: 26338
- Website: www.sanvicentedelasonsierra.org

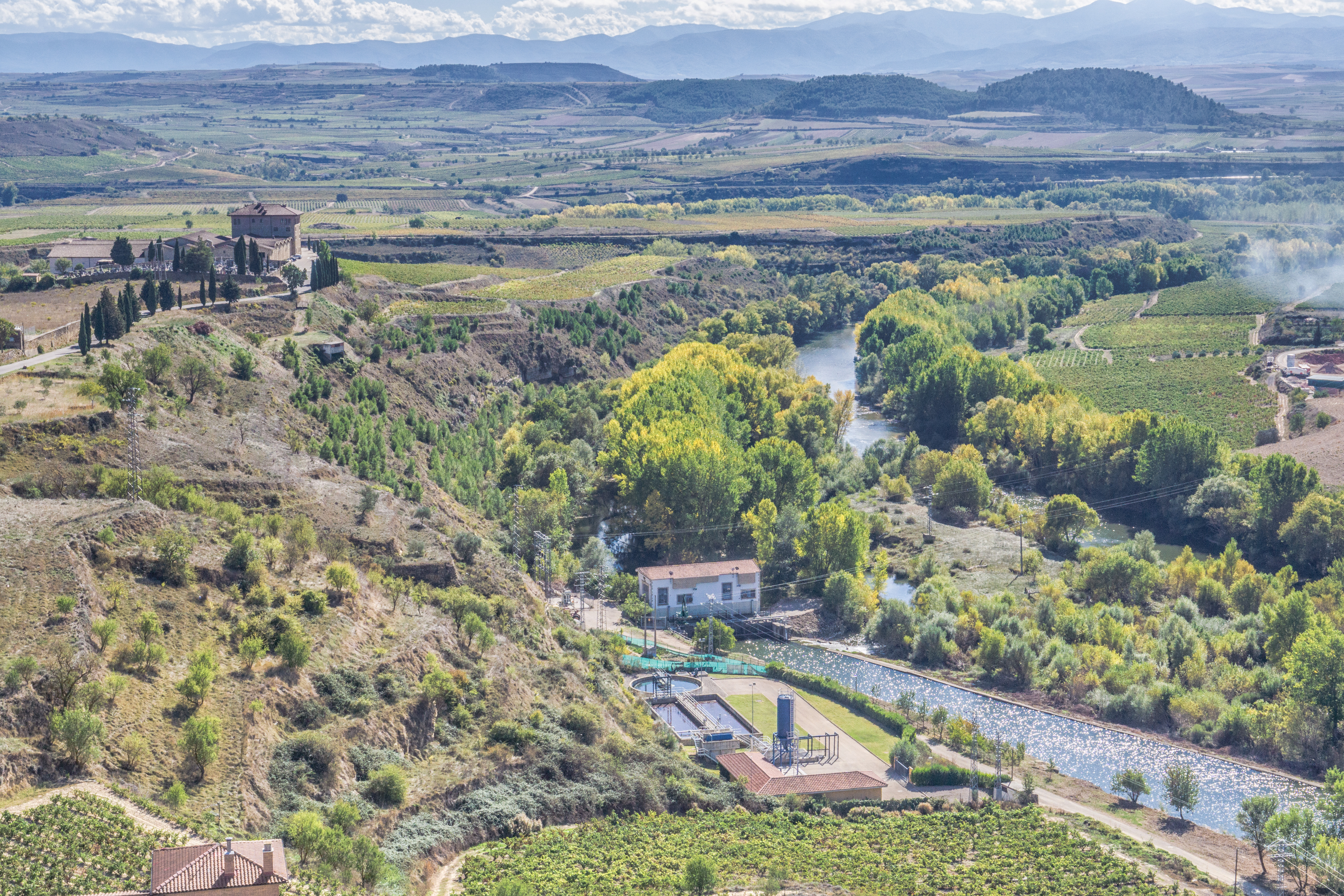
At the castle of San Vincente de la Sonsierra

San Vicente de la Sonsierra is a village in the province and autonomous community of La Rioja, Spain. The municipality covers an area of 48.56 square kilometres (18.75 sq mi) and as of 2011 had a population of 1132 people.

== Demographics ==
=== Population centres ===
- San Vicente de la Sonsierra
- Rivas de Tereso
- Peciña
- Pangua
- Orzales
- Doroño

== Places of interest ==
=== Religious Buildings ===
- Hermitage of Santa María de La Piscina
