= Wolfredo Wildpret de la Torre =

Spanish botanist (1933–2026)

Wolfredo Wildpret de la Torre (16 September 1933 – 13 March 2026) was a Spanish scientist and botanist.

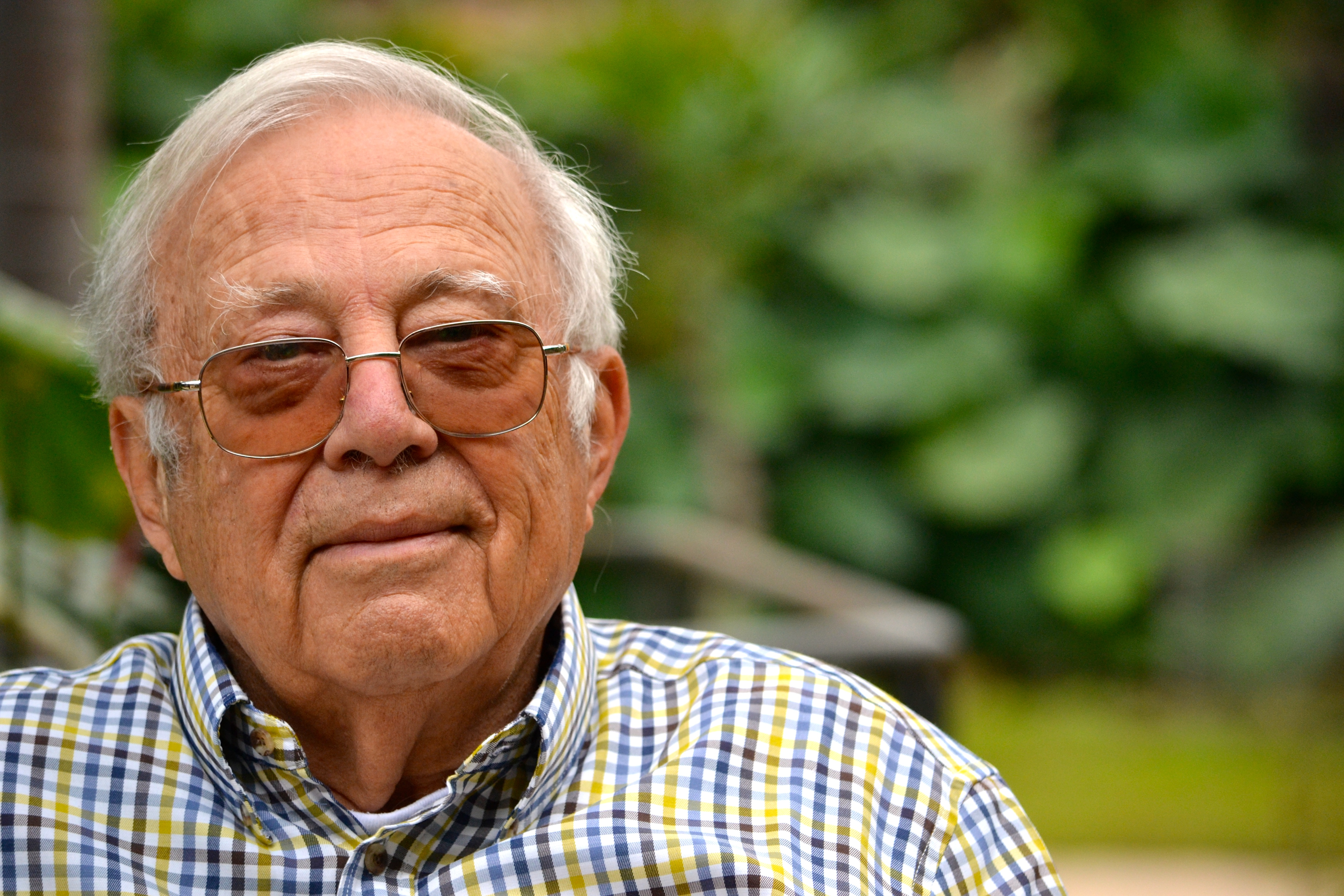
Wildpret de la Torre in 2013

== Life and career ==
Wolfredo Wildpret de la Torre was born in Santa Cruz de Tenerife on 16 September 1933. He was known for his facet as a naturalist, conservationist, popularizer and promoter of interest in mycology among the bulk of the Canary Islands population, as well as for cataloging numerous endemic species of the Canary Islands.

Throughout his life, he published numerous books on the flora and fauna of the Canary Islands.

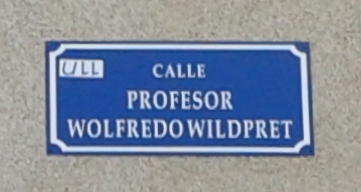
The street dedicated to Wilfredo at the University of La Laguna

In 2009, the University of La Laguna dedicated a street to him at the Anchieta campus.

Wildpret de la Torre died on 13 March 2026, at the age of 92.
