= Zoraida Burgos i Matheu =

Spanish Catalan writer (1933–2026)

- Born: 10 March 1933; Tortosa, Spain
- Died: 4 January 2026 (aged 92); Tortosa, Spain
- Occupations: Poet; writer; librarian; graphologist; art restoration
- Notable work: Convivència d'Aigües (complete poetry anthology)

Zoraida Burgos i Matheu (10 March 1933 – 4 January 2026) was a Spanish Catalan writer, poet and librarian. She also studied and worked as a graphologist and art restorer.

== Early life ==
The eldest of three sisters, Zoraida was born in Tortosa on 10 March 1933, just a few years before Franco's attempted coup d’état in Spain. The subsequent three years of the Spanish Civil War (1936–1939) led to most of the inhabitants of Tortosa having to evacuate the city and find refuge from the fascist forces in small houses in the surrounding countryside or nearby villages. The Burgos i Matheu family had to move three times before returning to Tortosa in 1939. The war and Franco's fascist dictatorship left its mark on Zoraida's generation.

== Studies and professional work ==
Zoraida studied Library and Information Science at the University of Barcelona in the early 1950s and worked for most of her professional career as a librarian. Her first post was a temporary one at Ulldecona Library (1955–56), following which she spent almost a year (1956–57) in London learning English and working in a nursery. She then worked at Amposta Library from 1957 until her contract finished in 1965 when she decided to take a break to bring up her family. She returned to work as a librarian at Tortosa Library in 1976 where she was later made Library Director in 1983 – a role she held until her retirement in 1998. Zoraida also studied handwriting analysis and obtained the official certificate necessary to work in legal cases which she often did alongside her work at the library. On her official retirement in 1998, she took up art restoration studies at the Tortosa Art School and continued to work there restoring a variety of works of art.

== Poetry ==
Her literary career began in 1971 when she published the poetry collection D'Amors, d'Enyors i d'Altres Coses (Of Love, Longing and Other Matters) which had won the Màrius Torres award in Lleida, 1970. Around the same time and in following years more of her poems were included in numerous anthologies. Her next poetry book was Vespres (Evenings) in 1978, followed by Cicle de la Nit (Cycle of the Night) (1982) with illustrations by Manolo Ripollés. In 1989 she published Reflexos (Reflections) which included the Cicle de la Nit poems and new poems, collaborating once more with the artist Manolo Ripollés. Next came Blaus (Blues) (1993), for which she received the Guerau de Liost poetry award in Olot in 1992. Then in 2013, Zoraida published Absolc el Temps (I Forgive Time), winner of the Vila de Lloseta poetry prize (2012). In 2015 she published a short collection of seven poems along with seven paintings by Pilar Lanau in Assaig (Essay/Rehearsal). A complete anthology of her published poetry was brought out by La Breu publishers in 2017, Convivència d’Aigues (The Co-existence of Waters). It obtained the Catalan Critics Poetry Prize for best published Catalan poetry in 2017.

== Narrative ==
Her prose work began in 1971 with the publication of a series of four children's books illustrated by her own young daughter with the Editorial Joventut publishing house. In the twenty-first century (2008–2018) she would return once again to writing children's stories. (see complete list below).

In 1994 she published her first and only narrative book for adults, L’Obsessió de les Dunes (The Obsession of the Dunes), a poetical fictionalized description of Zoraida's thoughts and experiences of places she has travelled to or visited. The book received the Josep Pin i Soler narrative award in 1993.

She also had stories published in a variety of collective books and also had many articles, prologues, and essays published in different books, magazines, newspapers and art catalogues.

== Translations ==
In 1965 Zoraida translated Letter from Birmingham Jail, a shortened version of the letter Martin Luther King sent to his followers in 1963 which had been adapted by the composer Paul Reif to be performed musically by choir and piano.

She translated three poems by Manoel de Barros which were included alongside translations by other Catalan writers and poets in an anthology in 2005 (published by Lleonard Muntaner).

Together with the poet Albert Roig, Zoraida translated poems and other texts by Rainer Maria Rilke into Catalan to be included in Roig's biography of Rilke, Gos, published in 2016 (Galaxia Gutenberg publishers).

Many of Zoraida's poems have been translated into Spanish, French and Portuguese.

== Music ==
Fragments of her texts and poems have been set to music by the singer-songwriter Montse Castellà on her L’Escriptor Inexistent album (2006) and Punts de Llibre (2018). The poem Hi Ha Cançons Que T’Apropen was set to music by Júlia Castellà.

== Death ==
Burgos I Matheu died in Tortosa on 4 February 2026, at the age of 92.

== Key events and recognitions ==
In 2003 Zoraida was invited to participate in the poetry recital Parallel Voices alongside three other Catalan poets (Montserrat Abelló, Teresa Pascual and Susanna Rafart) and four Portuguese poets (Maria Velho da Costa, Ana Marques Gastao, Ana Luísa Amaral, and Ana Hatherly) in an event organized by the Catalan Language Institution.

In 2011, a major recital to pay homage to Zoraida's work was organized in Tortosa. Bearing the same name as the later-published anthology, Convivència d’Aigues, it included speeches by the writers Albert Roig, Ricard Martínez Pinyol, Andreu Subirats and Albert Aragonès, all of whom have collaborated closely with Zoraida over the years, followed by the actress Sílvia Bel's recital of a selection of poems.

Her poem Només La Veu (Only the Voice) was translated into 20 different languages by the Catalan Language Institute to be given out and narrated in libraries and other public institutions celebrating World Poetry Day 2013.

In 2015 the public body the Catalan Women's Institute organized an itinerant exhibition featuring twelve women from the worlds of art, business, science, sport, or politics from the Ebre region of Catalonia – one of which was Zoraida.

In 2018 the Catalan cultural association Òmnium Cultural awarded her the Grifonet award.

In 2023 she was awarded the Catalan government's prestigious Creu de Sant Jordi award.

== Lists of works ==
=== Poetry ===
- D'amors, d'enyors i d'altres coses (Sicoris Club publishers, 1971)
- Vespres, including illustrations by Manolo Ripollés (published by Zoraida Burgos and Manolo Ripollès, 1978)
- Cicle de la nit, illustrated by Manolo Ripollés (Burgos and Ripollès, 1982)
- Reflexos (Institut d'Estudis Tarraconenses Ramon Berenguer IV, 1989)
- Blaus (Columna, 1993)
- Absolc el temps (Editorial Moll, 2013)
- Assaig, collaboration with the artist Pilar Lanau (200 copies printed and published by Burgos/Lanau, 2015)
- Convivència d'aigües (La Breu, 2017)

=== Narrative ===
- L'obsessió de les dunes (El Mèdol, 1994)

=== Children’s books ===
- Les perdiuetes de les potes vermell, illustrations (this and the following three books) by Zoraida Burgos (daughter) (Editorial Joventut, 1971)
- Les culleretes de lluna (Editorial Joventut, 1971)
- El mussol que va obrir els ulls de día (Editorial Joventut, 1971)
- La negreta Safu i el Narcís (Editorial Joventut, 1971)
- Una llarga aventura, illustrations Frederic Mauri (Cinctorres club, 2008)
- Contes de Riu (a collection of stories published by Associació Castellania in 2008): La Rosita Fulio 182, illustrated by Núria Arias; La gavina i els quatre gats de pèl roig, illustrated by Albert Aragonés; La Rosa i el llaüt, illustrated by Pepa Reverter; Les 26 lletres de la Júlia, illustrated by Manolo Ripollés; Els somnis d'en Daniel, illustrated by Manel Margalef; El trenet del Delta, illustrated by Joan Ripollés; Viatje al país d'en Yusuf, illustrated by Albert Aragonés; and Raig de lluna a les golfes; Un tresor esgarrifós; Les fantasies de l'Anna; Els ous de l'arenya – all four illustrated by Antonia Ripoll
- Tres Amics – Contes de Senegal, with illustrations by Aura Colomé (Lo Taller, 2018)

=== Work included in anthologies, collections and others ===
Antologia de la poesia social catalana (Alfaguara, 1970)

- Antologia da novissima poeia catalana (Editorial Futura, 1974)
- Les cinc branques: poesia femenina catalana (published by Esteve Albert, 1975)
- Antologia Price-Congrés (1977)
- La littérature catalane dins Europe (1981)
- L’escriptor de poesía. Poètica i antología del vint. By Albert Roig and Jordi Balcells (Editorial Teide, 1991)
- L’orgull de ser porcs, 1954-1993. Poems selected by Albert Roig (1993)
- Vores el riu. Photos and selection of texts by Jep Colomé and Albert Roig (Columna, 1997)
- Duna Delta, collection of stories chosen by JJ Rovira (Cinctorres Club, 1997)
- Macianet, el ventallenc. Collection of stories and memories by Manel Ollé (Pagès Editors, 1998)
- Contemporànies: antología de poetes dels Països Catalans (El Mèdol, 1999)
- Paisatge emergent. Trenta poetes catalanes del segle XX (La Magrana, 1999)
- Verdaguer i Manyà, vides creuades (Fundació Joan B. Manyà, 2002)
- El brogit de l'Ebre. 15 narradors donen veu al riu (Cossetània Edicions, 2003)
- Terres d'aigua. Poemari de les Terres de l'Ebre (Cossetània Edicions, 2004)
- Blanc sobre negre (Cossetània Edicions, 2006)
- La poesía de Gerard Vergés (URV/Ajuntament de Cambrils, 2009)
- Lletres de casa. Antologia de poetes ebrencs al Serret Bloc (March Editor, 2009)
- Com elles (Leonard Muntaner, 2017)
- L’Ebre, un riu literari (URV, 2017)
- Zoraida Burgos (UdL/URV, 2019)

== Translations ==
- Presó de Birmingham, 1963. A Catalan translation of a shortened version of Martin Luther King's 1963 letter from Birmingham Jail. 1965
- Riba del dessemblat: Antologia Poètica de Manoel de Barros. Includes three poems translated by Zoraida from Portuguese into Catalan. (Lleonard Muntaner, 2005)
- Gos. A Catalan language biography of Rainer Maria Rilke by Albert Roig. Includes poems and texts translated by Zoraida. (Galaxia Gutenberg, 2016)

== Awards ==
- Màrius Torres Poetry Award 1970 (Lleida) for D’Amors, d’Enyors I Altres Coses
- XXVI Guerau de Liost Award 1992 (Olot) for Blaus
- IV Pin I Soler Award for Narrative Literature 1993 (Tarragona) for L’Obsessió de les Dunes
- Vila de Lloseta Poetry Award 2012 for Absolc el Temps
- Catalan Poetry Critics Award 2017 for Convivència d’Aigües
- Grifonet Prize, awarded by Òmnium Cultural 2018
- Creu de Sant Jordi, 2023 (one of the highest civil distinctions awarded in Catalonia)
