= Josep Maria Cadena =

Spanish art critic and journalist (1935–2026)

Josep Maria Cadena Catalán (6 September 1935 – 2 June 2026) was a Spanish journalist and art critic.

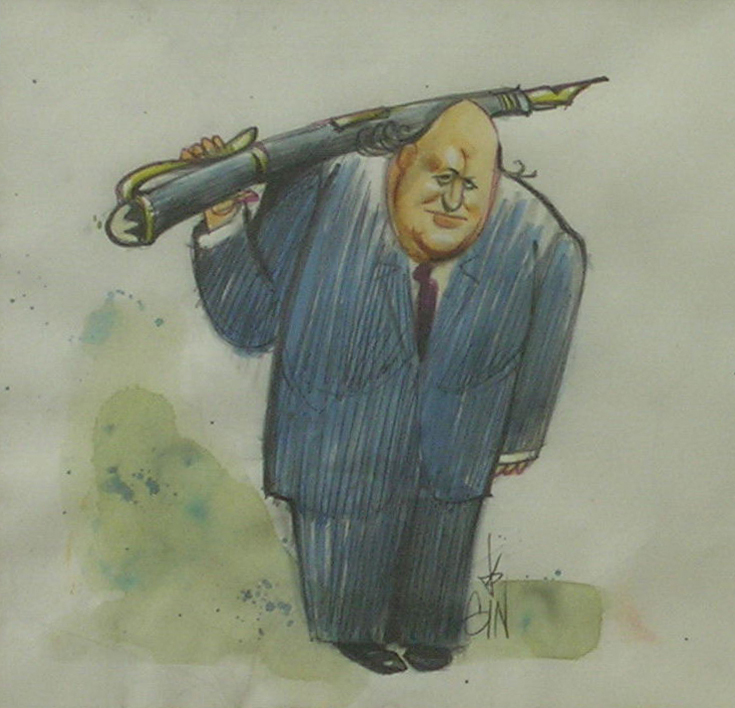
Depiction of Josep M. Cadena by the cartoonist Gin

== Life and career ==
Cadena graduated from the Official School of Journalism in Madrid in 1958, and appeared on both radio, and television. He earned the Mañé Flaquer prize for journalism for his five-volume work in the Diario de Barcelona on Barcelona humorous journalism in the nineteenth century.

He specialised in satirical drawings in Catalonia, collaborating in the books of Editorial Taber (1969–1979) on drawings by Juan Gris, Nonell, Apa, Humbert and others in the weekly Papitu, and also wrote pieces for the Great Catalan Encyclopaedia.

Cadena died on 2 June 2026, at the age of 90.

== Awards ==
- St. George's Cross (1995)
- City of Barcelona Award (1995)
- National Culture Award of Catalonia (2015)
- Gat Perich Award (2016)
