= Ricardo Ortiz (academic) =

American academic

- Born: September 23, 1961
- Died: August 18, 2025 (aged 63)

Academic background
- Education: Stanford University (BA); University of California, Los Angeles (MA, PhD)

Academic work
- Discipline: Latino studies
- Institutions: San Jose State University; Dartmouth College; Georgetown University

Ricardo L. Ortiz (September 23, 1961 – August 18, 2025) was a Cuban-born American scholar of US Latinx, queer, and literary studies. He was Professor of English at Georgetown University in Washington, D.C., where he taught since 1998. Ortiz was a leading figure in Latina/o/x literary and cultural studies for over thirty years, contributing to the development of a fields including Cuban American Studies, Hemispheric Américas Studies, Queer of Color Critique, and Comparative Latinx Studies. His work on Cuban-American narratives, queer theory, and Latinx aesthetics has become widely influential across multiple academic fields.

== Education and Academic Career ==
Born in Cuba on September 23, 1961, Ortiz immigrated to the working-class suburbs of Los Angeles when he was five years old, starting school without knowing any English. As a first generation student, he went on to earn his BA in English and Economics from Stanford University in 1983. Continuing his studies, he earned both his MA and Ph.D. in English from UCLA, in 1987 and 1992, respectively, influenced by scholars like Michel Foucault, Phyllis Schlafly, Catharine MacKinnon, and Jacques Derrida. He held tenure-track faculty appointments at San José State University and at Dartmouth College before starting at Georgetown University, where earned tenure in 2005 and was promoted to Professor in 2021.

During his tenure at Georgetown, Ortiz was active in supporting the Georgetown Scholars Program, the Community Scholars Program, MEChA, and La Casa Latina. He was also a pivotal figure in the creation of the LGBTQ Resource Center on campus in 2007, as one of Georgetown’s first openly gay professors. His devotion to education is recognized by Georgetown’s American Studies Teaching & Mentoring Award, named in his honor in 2023, as well as the Ricardo L. Ortiz Humanities Fund, inspired by Ortiz’s devotion to the humanities and a testament to his work as founder and director of the Master of Arts Program in Engaged and Public Humanities at Georgetown.

== Select Publications ==
=== Books ===
- Ortíz, Ricardo L. (2019). Latinx Literature Now: Between Evanescence and Event. London: Palgrave Macmillan. ISBN 978-3-030-04707-8. OCLC 1057775174.
- Ortíz, Ricardo L. (2007). Cultural Erotics in Cuban America. Minneapolis: University of Minnesota Press. ISBN 978-0-8166-4795-8. OCLC 69423145. – Recipient, Honorable Mention for the 2008 Alan Bray Memorial Book Award for outstanding scholarship in GL/Q Studies; awarded by the GL/Q Caucus of the Modern Language Association.
