= María Ángeles Mezquíriz Irujo =

Spanish archaeologist and museologist (1929–2026)

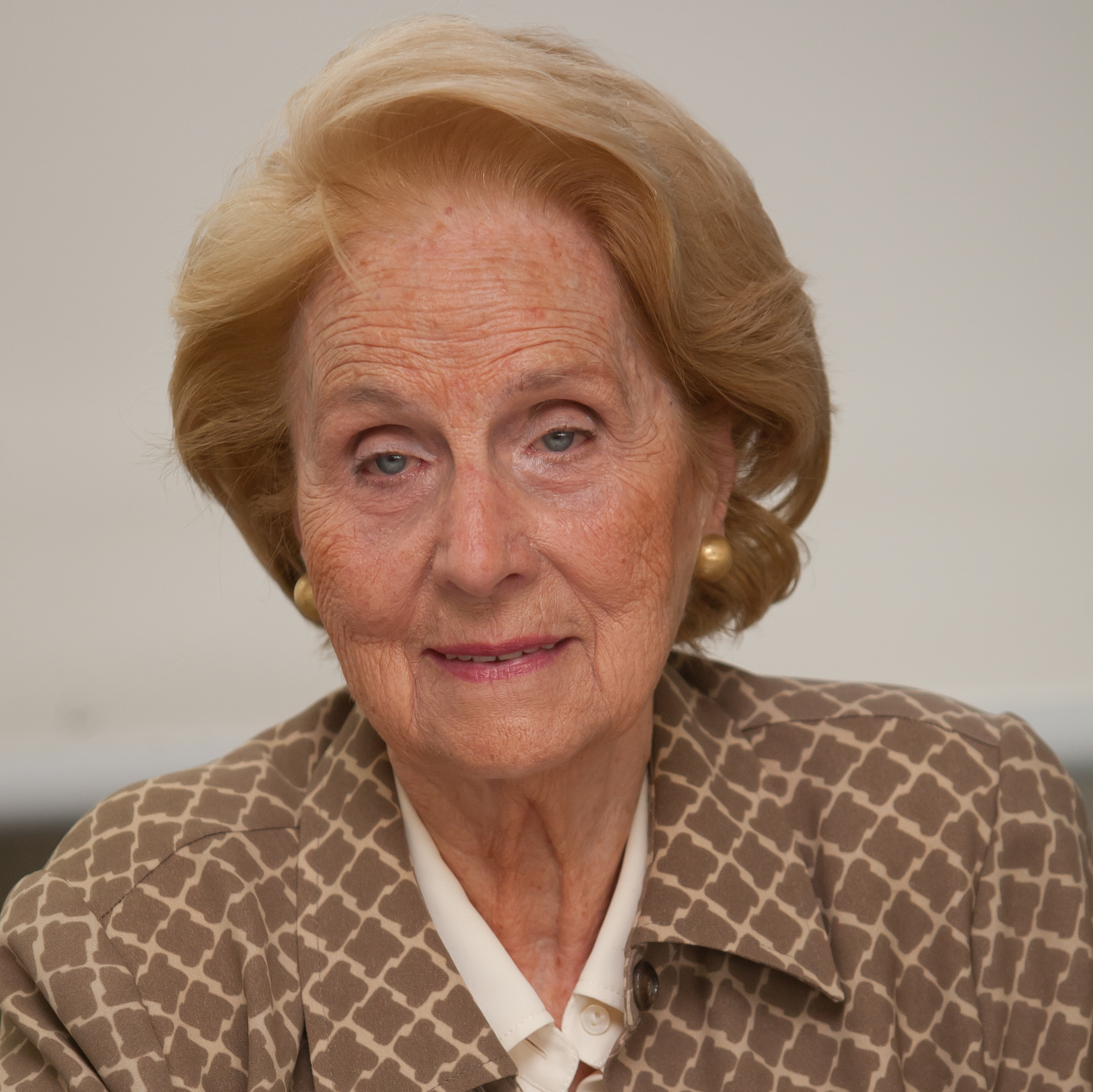
- Mezquíriz Irujo in 2014
- Born: 1 February 1929; Falces, Spain
- Died: 11 June 2026 (aged 97); Pamplona, Spain
- Education: University of Zaragoza
- Occupations: Archaeologist, museologist

María Ángeles Mezquíriz Irujo (1 February 1929 – 11 June 2026) was a Spanish archaeologist and museologist. A member of the Society of Historical Studies of Navarre, she served as director of the Museum of Navarre, Pamplona from 1957 to 1998.

Mezquíriz Irujo died in Pamplona on 11 June 2026, at the age of 97.
