= Isaías Zarazaga =

Spanish politician (1927–2026)

Isaías Zarazaga (1927 – 25 March 2026) was a Spanish veterinarian and politician.

== Life and career ==
Zarazaga studied at the Goya Institute of Zaragoza and veterinary medicine between 1944 and 1949. He was in charge of the chair at the end of 1956. In that year he was an inspector of the National Corps of Veterinarians and was assigned to the General Directorate of Livestock of the Ministry of Agriculture of Spain. In 1960 he obtained the Chair of Veterinary Medicine at the University of Zaragoza. He was awarded the Juan March Foundation scholarship there. He was a founding member of the Ebro Center for Agricultural Research and Development, in collaboration with the OECD. He worked as director of the National Center for Animal Selection and Reproduction at the end of 1975, when he asked for a voluntary leave to dedicate himself fully to teaching and research. He was also a councilor of the kingdom for three years.

In the Spanish general elections of 1977 he was chosen as senator for the Province of Zaragoza in the Independent Aragonese Candidacy of Center. He did not present himself for re-election. Later he was again a deputy in the general elections of Spain of 1982 and in those of 1986 for the Aragonese Regionalist Party.

After leaving active politics, he was president of the Genes y Gentes Foundation.

In 2023 the Government of Aragon awarded the Gabriel Cisneros Prize for constitutional values.

Zarazaga died on 25 March 2026, at the age of 98.
