= Fermín Sola Barrena =

Spanish police officer (1974–2026)

- Born: 17 April 1974
- Died: 3 June 2026 (aged 52)
- Cause of death: Traffic collision
- Education: University of La Rioja
- Occupation: Police officer

Fermín Sola Barrena (17 April 1974 – 3 June 2026), also known as Mintxo, was a Spanish police officer.

== Life and career ==
Fermín was born on 17 April 1974, to a Catholic family, and graduated in Criminology from the University of La Rioja.

Between February 2008 until his resignation in September 2011, he was police chief of Tafalla. He was succeeded by Mónica López Marín after he resigned.

At the time of his death, he was the chief commissioner of the Intervention Brigade in the Area of Citizen Security.

Sola Barrena died in a traffic collision alongside four other police officers, on 3 June 2026, at the age of 52.

== Awards ==
In 2022 he received the service medal from the Pamplona City Council for his work with the Pamplona Municipal Police.
