= Ricardo Melchior =

Spanish politician (1947–2026)

Ricardo Melchior Navarro (18 February 1947 – 31 January 2026) was a Spanish politician.

== Life and career ==
The funeral was held at Iglesia de la Concepción on 1 February 2026

Navarro was born in Santa Cruz de Tenerife on 18 February 1947. He was the president of the Island Council of Tenerife (1999–2013). He was appointed the president of the Port Authority of Santa Cruz de Tenerife (2015–2018).

Navarro died on 31 January 2026, at the age of 78.

== Distinctions ==
Navarro was appointed an honorary doctor of Science by the National University of Ireland, in the field of renewable energies, a distinction that was presented to him on 10 May 2002 at University College Cork. In September 2003 he was distinguished with the decoration of Knight of the National Order of Merit (Chevalier Dans L'Ordre National du Mérite) in recognition of his career in promoting social and civic progress.
