= José Carlos Gómez Villamandos =

Spanish politician (1963–2026)

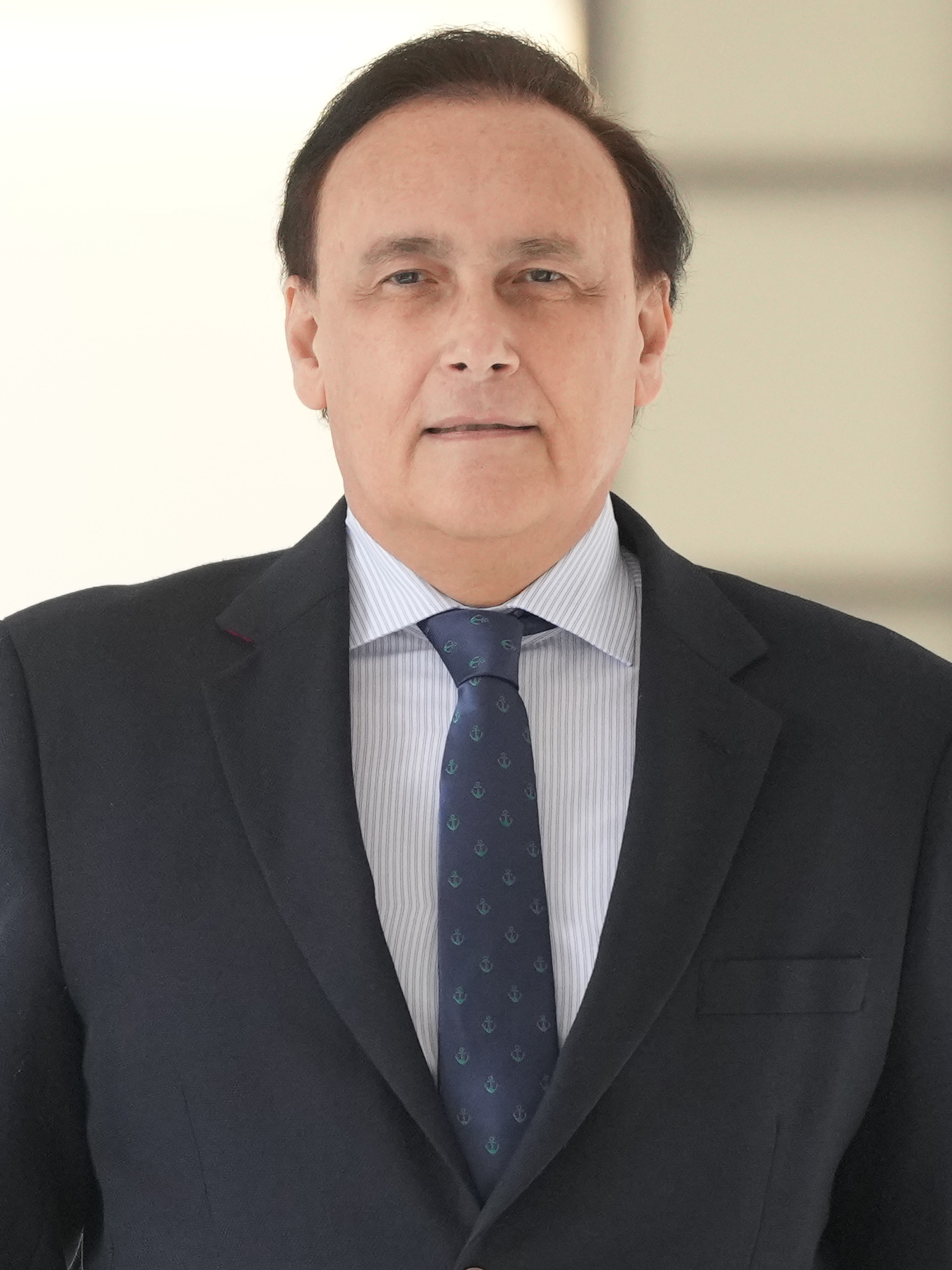
- Gómez Villamandos in 2024

Minister of Universities, Research and Innovation of Andalusia
- In office 26 July 2022 – 2 June 2026
- President: Juanma Moreno
- Preceded by: Rogelio Velasco (as Minister of Economic Transformation, Industry, Knowledge, and Universities)
- Succeeded by: TBD

Personal details
- Born: 1 January 1963 Córdoba, Spain
- Died: 2 June 2026 (aged 63) Córdoba, Spain
- Party: PP
- Education: University of Córdoba
- Occupation: Academic

José Carlos Gómez Villamandos (1 January 1963 – 2 June 2026) was a Spanish academic and politician. He was the rector of the University of Córdoba from 2014 to 2022. A member of the People's Party of Andalusia, he served as Minister of Universities, Research and Innovation of Andalusia from 2022 to 2026.

Gómez died of cancer in Córdoba, on 2 June 2026, at the age of 63.
