= Salomó Marquès =

Spanish academic and writer (1942–2026)

- Born: Salomó Marquès i Sureda; 4 February 1942; Alt Empordà, Catalonia, Spain
- Died: 25 June 2026 (aged 84)
- Education: University College of Girona
- Occupations: Academic, writer

Salomó Marquès i Sureda (4 February 1942 – 25 June 2026) was a Spanish academic and writer.

== Life and career ==
Salomó Marquès i Sureda was born on 4 February 1942 in Alt Empordà. At the age of 17 he entered the Seminary of Girona and in 1996 he was ordained a priest. In the exercise of these faculties, he was priest of Cassà de la Selva. In 1967 he was a teacher and educator at the Colegio Diocesà del Collell. Then, in 1996, he was the pedagogical director of the Colegio Menor Bisbe Cartañà in Girona. Subsequently, he was appointed councillor of the Diocesan Delegation of Scouting of Girona. In 1972 he took a sabbatical year in Rome, where he studied pedagogy.

In 1973 he began his studies in Education Sciences at the University College of Girona. The following year he became secular and married Montserrat Terradas. In 1975 he participated in the foundation of Justice and Peace of Girona, of which he would later be president. In 1978 he graduated in Education Sciences from the Autonomous University of Barcelona.

In the 1977/78 academic year, with his bachelor's thesis, he made known, with his analysis, the unknown second part of Baldiri Reixac's Instructions for the teaching of boys, Shortly after, he became a professor in the Department of Education Sciences of the Autonomous University of Barcelona. In 1981 he received his doctorate with a thesis on education in Girona during the eighteenth century.

In 1991 he actively participated in the creation of the University of Girona and was the first dean of the Faculty of Education Sciences during the period 1991–1994. In this faculty he became professor of theory and history of education, with the elaboration of a research on the exile of teachers after the victory of the Francoist side in the Spanish Civil War. After his retirement he was appointed professor emeritus at the University of Girona.

As a professor at the University of Girona, he taught History of Education in the degrees of Pedagogy and Social Education. Some of his research focuses on the study of teachers and the school during the Second Spanish Republic and the Franco regime. In 2006 he was awarded the Mestres 68 award.

He published several books on the exile of teachers, on the reality of the Francoist school, and different biographies of deported and exiled republican teachers, some of which have been published in Mexico, and also on scouting. At the beginning of 2012, a biographical approach to his pedagogical work was published.

On 8 May 2026, he received a massive tribute in recognition of his teaching and research work organised by the University of Girona under the title "Salomó Marquès, education, memory and democracy".

Marquès died on 25 June 2026, at the age of 84.
