= Santiago Marraco =

Spanish politician

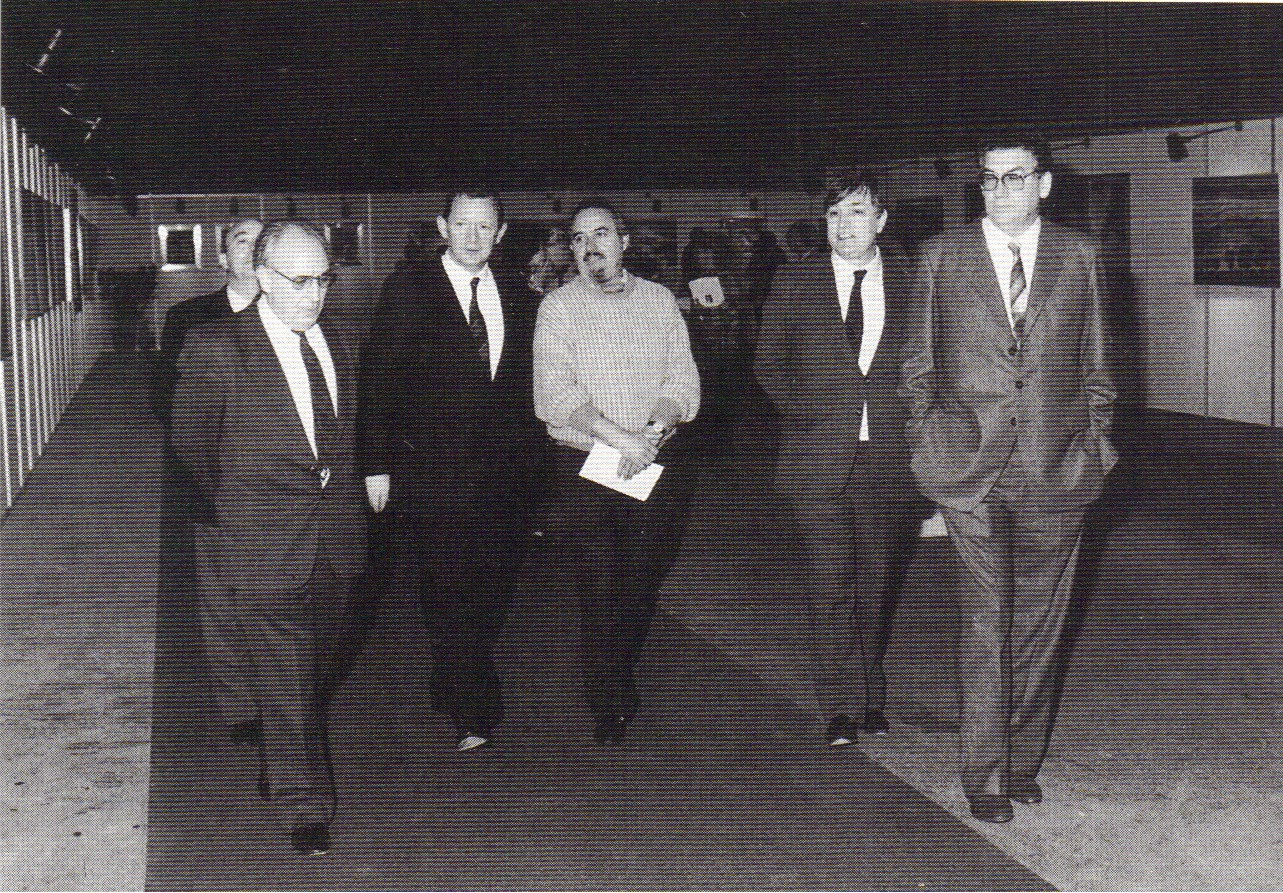
- Santiafo Marraco presidente Gobierno Aragón

President of the Government of Aragon
- In office 3 June 1983 – 30 July 1987
- Monarch: Juan Carlos I
- Preceded by: Juan Antonio de Andrés
- Succeeded by: Hipólito Gómez de las Roces

Personal details
- Born: Santiago Marraco Solana; 25 July 1938 Canfranc, Spain
- Party: PSOE

Santiago Marraco Solana (Canfranc, Spain, 25 July 1938) is a Spanish politician who belongs to the Spanish Socialist Workers' Party (PSOE) and who previously served as President of the Government of Aragon, one of the Spanish regional administrations, from 1983 to 1987.
