= Ricardo Ortiz (bullfighter) =

Spanish bullfighter (1974–2026)

- Born: 30 April 1974; Málaga, Spain
- Died: 3 April 2026 (aged 51); Málaga, Spain
- Cause of death: Bull attack
- Occupation: Bullfighter

Ricardo Ortiz (30 April 1974 – 3 April 2026) was a Spanish bullfighter.

In 2002, Ortiz was arrested for drug trafficking, after his vehicle was found with 200 grams of cocaine inside. He was sentenced to three and a half years in the Alhaurín de la Torre prison, but only served seven months in prison.

Ortiz died after being gored by a bull at the Plaza de La Malagueta in Málaga, on 3 April 2026, at the age of 51.
